= Becky (film series) =

Thriller film series

- Official film series logo
- Based on: Becky by Nick Morris, Lane Skye & Ruckus Skye
- Starring: Lulu Wilson; Kevin James; Seann William Scott; Neil Patrick Harris; Various actors (See below)
- Release dates: June 5, 2020 (Becky); May 26, 2023 (The Wrath of Becky); November 4, 2026 (The Last Temptation of Becky)
- Country: United States
- Language: English
- Box office: $1,271,232 (2 films)

The Becky film series, consists of action thriller installments, centered around the titular Rebecca "Becky" Hooper. Starring Lulu Wilson as the titular antihero who exacts vengeance for innocent victims murdered by villainous neo-nazi extremist-terrorists while navigating her own psychotic nature. The plot centers around Becky's progression through the years from rebellious teenager, to vigilante, and eventual recruitment as an undercover CIA operative.

The first film received mixed critical reception, though it was considered a financial success at a time when the film industry was impacted by the COVID-19 coronavirus pandemic. It was described as a cult film in multiple reviews. The 2023 sequel was similarly met with mixed critical reception like its predecessor, before also being deemed a cult classic.

The movies received critical praise for Wilson's portrayal of the unhinged character, their gore, and their use of dark humor mixed with the overall serious tone of the stories. A third film is scheduled to release on November 4, 2026.

== Films ==
Film	U.S. release date	Director(s)	Screenwriter(s)	Story by	Producers
Becky	June 5, 2020	Jonathan Milott & Cary Murnion	Nick Morris, Lane Skye & Ruckus Sky	Nick Morris, Lane Skye & Ruckus Sky	Raphael Margules, J. D. Lifshitz, Jordan Yale Levine, Jordan Beckerman and Russ Posternak
The Wrath of Becky	May 26, 2023	Matt Angel & Suzanne Coote	Matt Angel	Matt Angel & Suzanne Coote	Raphael Margules, J.D. Lifshitz, Jordan Yale Levine, Jordan Beckerman, Russ Posternak, Tracy Rosenblum and Chadd Harbold
The Last Temptation of Becky	November 4, 2026	Jenn Wexler	Matt Angel	Matt Angel & Suzanne Coote	Jordan Yale Levine, Jordan Beckerman, Russ Posternak, Chadd Harbold, Larry Greenberg, Paul Kennedy and Aideen Hand

=== Becky (2020) ===
Jeffrey "Jeff" Hooper plans a weekend getaway to the family cabin, to reconnect with his estranged teenage daughter Rebecca "Becky" Hooper. Grieving her mother's passing a couple of years previous, Becky resents her father's new relationship with his girlfriend Kayla and her son Ty. Arriving at the lakefront home, Jeff plans to bring everyone together in a mixed-family relationship, announcing his engagement to Kayla. Enraged by the news, Becky leaves the home with her dog named Diego for her clubhouse in the woods.

A group of Neo-Nazi fugitives from a maximum security prison including Dominick Lewis and his crew of men, invade the home in search of a valknut-shaped key hidden years previous on the property. Discovering that the relic is no longer to be found, the interaction escalates rapidly into a hostage situation as Dominick refuses to believe the family is not involved; unbeknownst to everyone, Becky had discovered the key and kept it in her possession prior to fleeing into the woods. When Becky discovers her family's dire circumstances and Dominick realizes she has the item he needs, a riskily dangerous game of cat and mouse ensues between the two characters. As he threatens to murder the innocent captives, Becky must fight to save her family before it's too late.

=== The Wrath of Becky (2023) ===
Three years following the events at the lakehouse which ended in the murder of her father, Becky has been placed into the foster care system. After repeatedly running away with her dog Diego, she lives off-grid with an elderly woman named Elena Cahn. Elena nurturingly took them in when they were homeless, and becomes a parent-figure as she encourages Becky to develop her skills and use her genius with purpose.

Her newfound peace with her comes to an end as an extremist domestic terrorist gang called the Noble Men follow her home from work one night, angered by her rebuttal of their advances. During their home invasion the group knock her unconscious, kills Elena, and abducts Diego with intentions that he become their dog. Determined to recover her only friend, Becky researches the names she overheard and locates their destination at the remote cabin of their leader named Darryl. While attempting to save Diego, she discovers that the group of men alongside various other factions of Noble Men have conspired to assassinate a visiting U.S. Senator at a local event the next morning.

Racing against the clock Becky must covertly recover Diego, while acquiring evidence of the conspiracy that can be turned over to law enforcement to prevent the success of their devised act of terror. As the Noble Men become aware of her presence, the situation escalates as they each attempt to eliminate her before she thwarts their plans.

=== The Last Temptation of Becky (2026) ===
In March 2023, Matt Angel stated that there are ongoing discussions for a third Becky film. By May of the same year, Wilson confirmed development for a sequel, while expressing hopes that Kate Siegel will reprise her role from the second installment. Confirming that the end of The Wrath of Becky is intended to set up events of a sequel, the actress further stated that she, the co-directors, and the producers are discussing the story of the next film, while reporting that Siegel has expressed interest in the project.

In February 2026, it was revealed that principal photography had concluded in Northern Ireland. Directed by Jenn Wexler, Matt Angel served as screenwriter from an original story he co-authored with Suzanne Coote, the plot will include the CIA's recruitment of Becky to operate as a field agent working undercover to infiltrate a corrupt family of innkeepers running a tourist attraction at Adolf Hitler's WWII bunker named the Wolf's Lair, where she must take a stand upon learning that the group plans to create a Fourth Reich. In addition to serving as an executive producer, Lulu Wilson will reprise her starring role; while Neil Patrick Harris, Brandon Flynn, James Urbaniak, and Kate Segal feature as the supporting cast. Russ Posternak, Chadd Harbold, Larry Greenberg, Paul Kennedy, Aideen Hand, Jordan Yale Levine, and Jordan Beckerman serve as producers; the project is a joint-venture production between BoulderLight Pictures, Post Film, Quiver Films, Village Films, Creativity Capital, Media Finance Capital and Northern Ireland Screen. Quiver Distribution will release the movie theatrically on November 4, 2026.

== Main cast and characters ==
List indicators

This section includes characters who will appear or have appeared in more than two films in the series.

- An empty grey cell indicates the character was not in the film, or that the character's official presence has not yet been confirmed.
- ^{C} indicates a cameo role.
- ^{V} indicates a voice-only role.

Character	Films		
Character	Becky	The Wrath of Becky	The Last Temptation of Becky
Principal cast
Rebecca "Becky" Hooper	Lulu Wilson	Lulu Wilson	Lulu Wilson
Dominick Lewis	Kevin James	Kevin James^{A}	
Daryll, Jr.		Seann William Scott	
Wilhelm Reuss			Neil Patrick Harris
Agent Kate Montana		Kate Siegel	Kate Siegel
Supporting cast
Jeffrey "Jeff" Hooper	Joel McHale	Joel McHale^{A}	
Mrs. Hooper	Chandra Michaels^{C}		
Kayla	Amanda Brugel		
Ty	Isaiah Rockcliffe		
Wallace "Apex" Landham	Robert Maillet	Robert Maillet^{A}	
Sonny Cole	Ryan McDonald		
Roman Hammond	James McDougall		
Elena Cahn		Denise Burse	
Daryll, Sr.		Jill Larson	
Anthony		Michael Sirow	
DJ Turner		Aaron Dalla Villa	
Sean		Matt Angel	
Twig		Courtney Gains	

== Additional production and crew details ==
Film	Crew/Detail					
Film	Composer	Cinematographer	Editor	Production companies	Distributing companies	Running time
Becky	Nima Fakhrara	Greta Zozula	Alan Canant	Yale Productions, BoulderLight Pictures	Quiver Distribution, Redbox Entertainment	1 hr 33 mins
The Wrath of Becky	Nima Fakhrara	Julia Swain	Stephen Boyer	BoulderLight Pictures, Post Film	Quiver Distribution	1 hr 23 mins
The Last Temptation of Becky	Nima Fakhrara	Julia Swain	Janna Emig	BoulderLight Pictures, Post Film	Quiver Distribution	1 hr 29 mins

== Reception ==
=== Box office and financial performance ===
Film	Box office gross			Box office ranking		Total home video sales	Budget	Worldwide net total income	Ref.
Film	North America	Other territories	Worldwide	All-time North America	All-time international	Total home video sales	Budget	Worldwide net total income	Ref.
Becky	$1,003,700	$60,414	$1,064,114	#9,375	#21,995	Information not publicly available	Information not publicly available	≥ $1,064,114	
The Wrath of Becky	$168,109	$39,009	$207,118	#12,394	#24,494	Information not publicly available	Information not publicly available	≥ $207,118	
The Last Temptation of Becky						TBA			—N/a

=== Critical and public response ===
Film	Rotten Tomatoes	Metacritic
Becky	72% (120 reviews)	54/100 (22 reviews)
The Wrath of Becky	89% (57 reviews)	51/100 (9 reviews)
The Last Temptation of Becky	100% (19 reviews)	
