= J. D. Lifshitz =

American film producer

- Born: Jordan David Lifshitz; October 13, 1992 (age 34); Great Neck, New York, U.S.
- Occupation: Film producer

Jordan David Lifshitz (born October 13, 1992) is an American film producer. In addition to co-founding production company BoulderLight Pictures, Lifshitz is best known for producing films including Becky, Companion, Barbarian, Woman of the Hour, Weapons and Buddy.

== Early life ==
Jordan David Lifshitz was born in Great Neck, New York, on October 13, 1992.

== Career ==
In 2012, Lifshitz and Raphael Margules co-founded the production company BoulderLight Pictures, through which they became known for their horror and thriller work. They have produced films such as Contracted (2013), Pledge (2018), The Vigil (2019), Barbarian (2022), and Woman of the Hour (2023).

BoulderLight signed a first-look feature film development deal with New Line Cinema in 2023, and a first-look television development deal with A+E Studios in 2024.

In 2025, Lifshitz and Margules were hired by Paramount Pictures to launch a new genre label called Paramount Primal. Under the deal, BoulderLight Pictures has the option to participate as equity co-financiers on projects. The first project announced was a remake of A Nightmare on Elm Street with the original screenplay. The first dated Paramount Primal release, Boys for Life, is produced by Lifshitz and will premiere on April 9, 2027.

Buddy, also produced by Lifshitz, premiered at the 2026 Sundance Film Festival and opened to $5.3 million on August 28, 2026; it was the first Roadside Attractions film since the COVID-19 pandemic to earn $20 million at the United States/Canada box office.

== Filmography ==
Year	Title	Director	Co-production company(s)	Distributor(s)	Box office	Ref.
2010	Modern Romance	J. D. Lifshitz	BoulderLight Pictures	BoulderLight Pictures		
2010	Killed on the Fourth of July	J. D. Lifshitz	PKWY Media	BoulderLight Pictures		
2010	2001 Maniacs: Field of Screams	Tim Sullivan	BloodWorks; Social Capital Films; Ambergreen Entertainment	First Look Studios (US ) Anchor Bay Entertainment (UK); Tax Credit Finance		
2013	Contracted	Eric England	Southern Fried Films	IFC Films	$4,105	
2015	Contracted: Phase II	Josh Forbes	N/A	IFC Films	N/A	
2015	Dementia	Mike Testin	N/A	IFC Films	TBA	
2016	Uncaged	Daniel Robbins	Stag Pictures	RLJ Entertainment	TBA	
2016	Dementia: Part II	Mike Testin; Matt Mercer	Prolefeed Films; Rubrick Pictures	Dark Star Pictures	TBA	
2017	Bad Match	David Chirchirllo	mm2 Entertainment	Orion Pictures; Gravitas Venturas	$3,351	
2017	Dismissed	Benjamin Arfmann	Sun Entertainment Culture Limited; Making Film	The Orchard	TBA	
2018	Pledge	Daniel Robbins	Stag Pictures	IFC Midnight	N/A	
2019	The Vigil	Keith Thomas	Blumhouse Productions; Angry Adam Productions; Night Platform	IFC Midnight	$1.9 million	
2019	Portals	Gregg Hale Liam O’DonnellEduardo SanchezTimo Tjahjanto	Pigrat Productions	Bloody Disgusting	TBA	
2020	Becky	Jonathan Milott; Cary Murnion	Yale Productions	Quiver Distribution; Redbox Entertainment	$1.1 million	
2020	On the Rocks	Sofia Coppola	American Zoetrope	A24; Apple TV+	$1 million	
2020	Browse	Mike Testin	Making Film; Prolefeed Films	FilmRise	TBA	
2021	Doors	Jeff Desom; Ed Hobbs; Saman Kesh	N/A	Bloody Disgusting	TBA	
2021	Wild Indian	Lyle Mitchell Corbine Jr.	Logical Pictures; 30West; Om Films; MM2 Entertainment; Pureplay Entertainment	Vertical Entertainment	TBA	
2022	Barbarian	Zach Cregger	Regency Enterprises; Almost Never Films; Hammerstone Studios; Vertigo Entertainment	20th Century Studios	$45.5 million	
2022	Firestarter	Keith Thomas	Blumhouse Productions; Weed Road Pictures	Universal Pictures	$15 million	
2022	Gone in the Night	Eli Horowitz	SSS Entertainment; Post Films mm2 Entertainment	Vertical Entertainment	$266,466	
2023	Woman of the Hour	Anna Kendrick	AGC Studios; Vertigo Entertainment	Netflix	N/A	
2023	The Wrath of Becky	Matt Angel; Suzanne Coote	Post Films	Quiver Distribution	$202,110	
2025	Friendship	Andrew DeYoung	Fifth Season	A24	$16.2 million	
2025	Companion	Drew Hancock	Vertigo Entertainment; New Line Cinema	Warner Bros. Pictures	$36.7 million	
2025	Weapons	Zach Cregger	Vertigo Entertainment; New Line Cinema	Warner Bros. Pictures	$268 million	
2026	Buddy	Casper Kelly	Low Spark Films; Sipur Studios; Substance.	Roadside Attractions; Saban Films	$22 Million	
2026	The Last Temptation of Becky	Jenn Wexler	Post Film; Dominion Films; Creativity Capital; Village Films	Quiver Distribution	TBA	

=== Upcoming Films ===
	Title	Director	Notes	Distributed by
2027	Molepeople	Rob Savage	Co-production with Paramount Primal and Blumhouse–Atomic Monster.	Paramount Pictures
2027	Boys for Life	Tyler Falbo	R-rated comedy to be released on April 9, 2027	Paramount Primal
TBA	Play Dead	Jaume Collet-Serra	co-production with Ghost House Pictures, Nocturnal Entertainment, Bad Grey and Renaissance Pictures.	Netflix

=== In development ===
Title	Notes	Ref.
Untitled A Nightmare on Elm Street remake	Co-production with New Line Cinema	
Untitled Amityville film	Co-production with Divide/Conquer	
Cut Outs	Co-production with New Line Cinema	
The Faculty	Co-Production between Miramax and Troublemaker Studios	
Hello Neighbor	Co-production with tinyBuild	
I Can See You're Angry	Co-production with Miramax	
Weep	TBA	
Sweet Spot	Thriller	
The Troop	Based on the horror novel by Nick Cutter	
Tower Defense	R-rated fantasy from writer Evan Daugherty	

== Awards and nominations ==
Year	Association	Category	Work	Result
2021	ReFrame	Narrative & Animated Feature	Becky	Won
2022	Golden Scythe	Best Horror Film	Barbarian	Won
2023	Phoenix Critics Circle	Best Picture	Barbarian	Won
2023	Portland Critics Association	Best Picture	Barbarian	Won
2023	ReFrame	Feature	Barbarian	Won
2025	8th Astra Midseason Movie Awards	Most Anticipated Film	Weapons	Nominated
