= Zach Kuperstein =

American cinematographer

- Born: Boston, Massachusetts, U.S.
- Occupation: Cinematographer
- Years active: 2009 - Present

Zach Kuperstein is an American cinematographer. He is best known for his work on Barbarian, The Climb, The Vigil and The Eyes of My Mother.

== Career ==
Zach graduated from New York University Tisch School of the Arts with a BFA in film and TV. He is a member of the International Cinematographers Guild (IATSE Local 600). Variety named him Artisan Elite in 2017. He has worked on music videos for Berhana, Aloe Blacc, A Place to Bury Strangers and more. He was also a director of photography for many short films, including Caught, No Longer Suitable for Use, Power Signal and more.

In 2016, Zach served as cinematographer for the film The Eyes of My Mother, for which he was nominated at the 32nd Independent Spirit Awards and Camerimage.

== Filmography ==
=== Feature film ===
Year	Title	Director	Notes
2016	The Eyes of My Mother	Nicolas Pesce	
2016	5 Doctors	Max Azulay; Matt Porter	
2018	Jonathan	Bill Oliver	
2019	The Climb	Michael Angelo Covino	
2019	The Vigil	Keith Thomas	
2020	Model	Ran Jing	With Shlomo Godder
2020	Paper Spiders	Inon Shampanier	
2021	With/In		
2022	Barbarian	Zach Cregger	
2023	Woman of the Hour	Anna Kendrick	
2024	Don't Move	Brian Netto; Adam Schindler	
2025	Untitled Home Invasion Romance	Jason Biggs	
2026	Buddy	Casper Kelly	
2027	Who Framed Tommy Callahan	Harry Kellerman	
2027	The Revenge of La Llorona	Santiago Menghini	

=== Television ===
Year	Title	Director	Notes
2014-2015	New Timers		
2015	The Untitled Web Series That Morgan Evans Is Doing for MTV	Morgan Evans	
2019	Who Won the Year?	Matt Porter; Jeremy Redleaf	TV special
2023	Monster Factory	Galen Summer; Naiti Gámez	

=== Music video ===
Year	Title	Artist	Director
2014	"Go"	Katie Buchanan	
2017	"Grey Luh"	Berhana	Sam Guest
2018	"Brooklyn in the Summer"	Aloe Blacc	Anthony Williams
2018	"Hand of God"	Mannywellz	
2022	"I Disappear (When You're Near)"	A Place to Bury Strangers	Keith Thomas

== Awards and nominations ==
Year	Result	Award	Category	Work	Ref.
2016	Nominated	Camerimage	Best Cinematography Debut	The Eyes of My Mother	
2017	Nominated	Independent Spirit Awards	Best Cinematography	The Eyes of My Mother	
