= The Last Temptation of Becky =

2026 action film

- Theatrical release poster
- Directed by: Jenn Wexler
- Screenplay by: Jenn Wexler; Matt Angel
- Story by: Matt Angel; Suzanne Coote
- Based on: Characters by: Nick Morris; Ruckus Skye; Lane Skye
- Produced by: Larry Greenberg; Bannor Michael MacGregor; Paul Kennedy; Aideen Hand; Jordan Yale Levine; Jordan Beckerman; Russ Posternak; Chadd Harbold
- Starring: Lulu Wilson; Neil Patrick Harris; Kate Siegel; Brandon Flynn; Catherine Walker; James Urbaniak
- Cinematography: Julia Swain
- Edited by: Janna Emig
- Music by: Nima Fakhrara
- Production companies: Post Film; Village Films
- Distributed by: Quiver Distribution (United States); Signature Entertainment (United Kingdom)
- Release dates: July 25, 2026 (Fantasia Fest); November 4, 2026 (United States)
- Running time: 90 minutes
- Countries: United States; United Kingdom
- Language: English

The Last Temptation of Becky is a 2026 action thriller film directed by Jenn Wexler. It is the third installment in the Becky film series, and a sequel to The Wrath of Becky (2023). The film stars Lulu Wilson returning as the eponymous antihero, alongside Neil Patrick Harris, Kate Siegel, Brandon Flynn, Catherine Walker, and James Urbaniak.

== Plot ==
Two years after the events of the previous film, Becky, now eighteen, has been recruited by the CIA, but has been suspended multiple times thanks to her anger issues. After going rogue again on her third mission, CIA Director Baker discusses Becky’s position with Agent Montana and Agent Rigby, Becky’s love interest. Director Baker reprimands Becky about how she used an intel computer as a meat mallet and bashed the targets head in with it.

Now stuck on probation at her apartment in New York, Becky laments on how she can never return to a normal life while she looks at videos of her dog Diego, having given him away to a new family. Some time later, Becky gets recruited for a rescue mission by Director Baker, who informs Becky that Neo-Nazi General Wilhelm Reuss is responsible for Dominic Lewis’s jailbreak all those years ago. Director Baker also reveals how the valknut key Dominic was looking for under Becky’s lake house was hidden there by Reuss’s great-grandfather several years ago, thus revealing the key actually has coordinates to The Wolf’s Lair in Poland and that the key unlocks a hidden chamber underneath the lair.

Becky agrees to go undercover but is soon after caught by Reuss. Becky finds out that he has been killing guests and draining their blood, hence why he needed the key in the first place; the key unlocks a cryo-chamber holding a clone of Hitler in an attempt to create a Fourth Reich. Realizing that Director Baker sent her on an unauthorized suicide mission to have her killed, Becky resorts to her roots and goes rogue. After killing Reuss’s family, Becky is caught but she grabs a machine gun and kills the Hitler clone the second it steps out of its cryo-tank. After escaping, she sends info on the Fourth Reich to news stations, causing Reuss’s plan to backfire and fail as his intentions are exposed on live television.

Meanwhile, Agent Montana exposes Director Baker for her negligence, getting her fired as Montana becomes the new director. Becky, on the other hand, kills all of Reuss’s men and scientists, but Reuss kills Rigby, which sends Becky into a frenzy. Reuss shoots Becky in the abdomen while she shoots an exploding dart at Reuss, killing him. Becky collapses by a tree outside of the Wolf’s Lair as the Polish Military bomb the lair.

While the CIA cover up their tracks, they report that Becky’s body was never found.

== Cast ==
- Lulu Wilson as Becky Hooper
- Neil Patrick Harris as General Wilhelm Reuss
- Kate Siegel as Agent Montana
- Brandon Flynn as Jordan Rigby
- Catherine Walker as Helga Reuss
- James Urbaniak as Dr. Friedrich Metzger

== Production ==
In March 2023, Matt Angel stated that there were ongoing discussions for a third Becky film. By May of the same year, Wilson confirmed development for a sequel, while expressing hope that Kate Siegel would reprise her role from the second installment. Confirming that the end of The Wrath of Becky was intended to set up events for a sequel, the actress further stated that she, the co-directors, and the producers were discussing the story of the next film, while reporting that Siegel had expressed interest in the project.

Principal photography had been completed by February 2026, in Northern Ireland, with Jenn Wexler directing. Neil Patrick Harris, Brandon Flynn, James Urbaniak, Noah Leggott and Kate Siegel rounded out the cast. Julia Swain served as the cinematographer, Janna Emig edited the film, and Nima Fakhrara composed the score.

== Release ==
The Last Temptation of Becky premiered at Fantasia Festival in Montreal, Canada on July 25, 2026. In attendance were actors Lulu Wilson and Noah Leggott, along with director Jenn Wexler, producers Chadd Harbold and Russ Posternak and editor Janna Emig. The film was theatrically released on November 4, 2026 in the United States.

== Reception ==
On review aggregator Rotten Tomatoes, the film holds a 76% approval rating based on 37 critic reviews, with an average rating of 6.7/10.
