= The Vigil (2019 film) =

2019 American supernatural horror film

- French theatrical release poster
- Directed by: Keith Thomas
- Written by: Keith Thomas
- Produced by: Raphael Margules; J. D. Lifshitz; Adam Margules
- Starring: Dave Davis; Menashe Lustig; Malky Goldman; Fred Melamed; Lynn Cohen
- Cinematography: Zach Kuperstein
- Edited by: Brett W. Bachman
- Music by: Michael Yezerski
- Production companies: Blumhouse Productions; BoulderLight Pictures; Angry Adam Productions; Night Platform
- Distributed by: IFC Midnight
- Release dates: September 9, 2019 (TIFF); August 5, 2020 (International); February 26, 2021 (United States)
- Running time: 89 minutes
- Country: United States
- Languages: English; Yiddish
- Box office: $1.9 million

The Vigil is a 2019 American supernatural horror film written and directed by Keith Thomas in his feature directorial debut. It stars Dave Davis, Menashe Lustig, Malky Goldman, Fred Melamed and Lynn Cohen, and follows a young man who is tasked with keeping vigil over a deceased member of his former Orthodox Jewish community, only to be targeted by a malevolent spirit known as a Mazzik (Hebrew found in the Talmud: מזיקין). Jason Blum serves as an executive producer through his Blumhouse Productions banner.

The Vigil premiered at the 2019 Toronto International Film Festival on September 9, 2019. The film received a limited theatrical release in the United Kingdom, Ireland, and New Zealand in July 2020, before being released internationally on August 5, 2020. It was released in the United States on February 26, 2021, by IFC Midnight.

== Plot ==
The film opens with an unidentified boy forced by a man in a black Nazi uniform to shoot a young woman in a forest, as a strange figure approaches them in the background.

The film then cuts to Yakov Ronen, a man who has left the Orthodox Jewish community in Brooklyn. He is struggling to deal with an unspecified traumatic event in his past and to pay his rent due to not having a job. He is approached by Reb Shulem, a member of his former Orthodox Jewish community, to keep vigil over Rubin Litvak, a Holocaust survivor who had died recently. Shulem had previously hired a Shomer, but that individual had left due to being "afraid", and Ronen had prior experience with keeping vigil. Ronen accepts the job after negotiating a higher fee. That night, Ronen and Shulem meet with Litvak's widow, who is suffering from Alzheimer's disease and reluctantly accepts Ronen as a Shomer, and Shulem informs Ronen that the mortuary men will arrive in five hours.

Ronen begins his vigil; he starts to hear strange noises and sees a shadowy figure in the house's dining room. He finds a photo of Litvak and his family with a similar shadowy figure behind them, before briefly going to sleep; he has a nightmare about his younger brother being tormented by some older men. Upon waking up, Ronen experiences additional strange events, such as the lights flickering while he texts his friend Sarah, and finds a video on his phone sent by an unknown number. The video shows Mrs. Litvak approaching Ronen and touching his face while he is asleep; the video file vanishes from his phone a few seconds later.

Ronen has a conversation with Mrs. Litvak, who explains that she drove their children away. Ronen then finds a television in the basement, playing a video recording of Litvak and his wife. In the recording, Litvak explains that he was haunted by a Mazzik, a malevolent spirit, since his time in Buchenwald, that it latches onto a "broken person" and that its true face must be burned by dawn on the first night of its appearance to banish it. The Mazzik appears behind Ronen, and he flees from the basement. Ronen gets a call apparently from his physician, Dr. Kohlberg, and from his dead brother, who asks: "Why did you let me die?"

Ronen leaves the house to get Shulem, though Mrs. Litvak warns him that he has been in the house for too long. However, Ronen experiences cracking bones while walking down the street, and is confronted by the Mazzik. Ronen hastily returns to the house, and falls down the steps after being startled by the Mazzik appearing in front of the door. A flashback then reveals that Ronen's brother was killed in a car accident after escaping from the men who were tormenting him, and Ronen has felt guilty about his death ever since.

With Mrs. Litvak's assistance, Ronen confronts the Mazzik, which has shapeshifted its true face to look like Ronen's. After initially hesitating, Ronen sets its true face on fire, and then banishes it when it begins to make Litvak's body contort loudly. A flashback reveals that Litvak was the boy forced to shoot the young woman in the opening scene; the pain Litvak felt after the shooting caused the Mazzik to latch on to him.

On the next morning, the mortuary men arrive to collect Litvak's body, and Shulem asks Ronen to attend morning prayers with him; Ronen declines his offer, saying "not today". As he leaves the house, a dark figure (presumably the Mazzik) is seen following Ronen out of the house and heading down the street behind him, presumably to find a new victim.

== Cast ==
- Dave Davis as Yakov Ronen
- Menashe Lustig as Reb Shulem
- Malky Goldman as Sarah
- Fred Melamed as Dr. Kohlberg
- Lynn Cohen as Mrs. Litvak
- Ronald Cohen as Rubin Litvak
  - Dun Laskey as young Rubin Litvak
- Nati Rabinowitz as Lane
- Moshe Lobel as Lazer
- Lea Kalisch as Adina
- Efraim Miller as Hersch

== Release ==
The Vigil had its world premiere at the Toronto International Film Festival on September 9, 2019.

The film received a limited theatrical release in the United Kingdom and Ireland in July 2020 through Blumhouse Productions and Vertigo Releasing. It began screening in select theaters in New Zealand on July 16, and was released internationally on August 5, 2020. In October 2020, IFC Midnight acquired the film's distribution rights for the United States and the film was released on February 26, 2021.

== Reception ==
=== Box office ===
Upon release in the UK and Ireland, The Vigil grossed £30,302 ($39,500 USD) from 97 sites over its opening weekend.

=== Critical response ===
On the review aggregator website Rotten Tomatoes, 91% of 116 critics' reviews are positive, with an average rating of 7.1/10. The website's consensus reads: "Consistently clever and creepy, The Vigil mines richly atmospheric supernatural horror from a deep well of religious traditions." On Metacritic, the film has a score of 69 out of 100, based on 18 critics, indicating "generally favorable reviews".

Variety's Dennis Harvey gave the film a mostly positive review, calling it an "effectively creepy, small-scale chiller that does a nice job eking suspense from its simple story and limited setting." Eric Kohn of IndieWire gave the film a grade of B, praising Davis's performance and writing that, "even as The Vigil settles into a familiar routine, it tackles that task with a polished, at times even elegant approach to a haunted house formula."

Jordan Mintzer of The Hollywood Reporter wrote that writer-director Keith Thomas "keeps the tension high throughout most of the movie, even if some of his scare tactics can feel redundant", and that he "transforms Orthodox culture into gory material for a slightly elevated horror flick". Phil Hoad of The Guardian gave the film a score of 3 stars out of 5, writing that the film "doesn’t examine rising antisemitism, so it doesn’t have the same contemporary punch as Get Out had regarding Black Lives Matter, or The Invisible Man for #MeToo", but added: "it is all the same an authentically Jewish and reasonably competent chiller." Joe Lipsett of Bloody Disgusting wrote that "The Vigil doesn't exactly break the mould of demonic spirit films, though its sound design, lighting and lead performance certainly make it a solid entry."

Brian Tallerico of RogerEbert.com gave the film a mostly negative review, writing: "Sadly, director Keith Thomas doesn't trust his own themes or visual sense, swallowing his entire film up in abrasive sound design and a reliance on jump scares." Barry Hertz of The Globe and Mail described the film as "the cinematic equivalent of first-timer gefilte fish", adding: "In writer-director Keith Thomas's bid to add a layer of thematic novelty to a familiar genre, he has come up with a mish-mash that will satisfy only those with extremely acquired tastes."
