= Xeno (film) =

- Theatrical release poster
- Directed by: Matthew Loren Oates
- Written by: Matthew Loren Oates
- Produced by: Kevin Hart; Jesse Jensen; Luke Kelly-Clyne; Shana Marie; Matthew Loren Oates; Bryan Smiley; Rameez Khan
- Starring: Lulu Wilson; Omari Hardwick; Paul Schneider
- Cinematography: Paul Marschall
- Edited by: Matthew Loren Oates; Brian Scott Steele
- Music by: Ryan Taubert
- Production company: Hartbeat Productions
- Distributed by: Blue Fox Entertainment
- Release date: September 19, 2025
- Running time: 103 minutes
- Country: United States
- Language: English

Xeno is a 2025 American science fiction adventure film directed, written, produced, and edited by Matthew Loren Oates. The film follows a teenage girl who makes friends with an alien after it crashes nearby in the desert.

The film was released in the United States on September 19, 2025.

== Plot ==
A meteor-like object hurtles towards Earth and crashes in the New Mexico desert. A nearby hunter investigates and is attacked by a monstrous alien creature, while his dog flees.

Renee is a 15-year-old girl who lives in New Mexico with her mother Linda, who has fallen into a deep depression after the death of her husband, David, and her new boyfriend, Chase, a selfish and violent man. She is an antisocial outsider keeping a selection of reptiles and arachnids as pets. After her distaste for Chase causes an argument at dinner, Renee runs into the desert and comes upon the impact site, where she encounters the alien entangled with the hunter's car and frees it before fleeing. The next day, Renee collects equipment, including Chase's revolver, and returns to investigate. After finding the alien and freeing it from the hunter's jaw trap still attached to it, they form a bond; but after returning home, Renee discovers that she forgot the gun in the desert. Intending to recover it, she finds the creature right outside her house. It creates an empathic link with her, and after recovering from the resulting shock, Renee hides the alien in the basement of her house and names it Croak.

Soon after, Gil, Renee's classmate who is interested in her, comes by to fetch his video camera, which Renee had borrowed for her alien search, and discovers a recording of Croak on it. Confronted, Renee shows him the alien and extracts a promise from him to keep quiet about it; however, CIA Agent Keyes and his partner Browne have been investigating Croak's arrival, followed its trail back to Renee and overheard her and Gil's conversation. The next evening, Chase confronts her about his missing gun and becomes violent to her. Alerted by her distress, Croak rams the basement's wall, shaking the house and breaking up the fight, and Linda throws Chase out of the house.

The morning after, Renee is picked up by Keyes, who tries to coax her into confessing about Croak, which Renee resists. Linda, believing the shaking was due to an earthquake, calls a plumber to check the water pipes in the basement. The plumber finds Croak, flees in a panic and is killed in a car crash. Upon discovering this, Renee takes Croak into the desert at night to meet with Gil, who tells her that he was visited by Browne, who threatened to deport his grandfather if he didn't tell him about Croak. Renee decides to run away, but is caught by Chase, who prepares to kill her for turning Linda against him. Sensing her distress, Croak arrives and kills Chase before running back into the desert after seeing Renee's fear.

Right afterwards, Keyes arrives and restrains Renee; the CIA sets up a trap, and Keyes brutally breaks Renee's finger to lure Croak to them. Croak is captured as it comes to Renee's aid, and they are taken to the local sheriff's office. Keyes tells Renee that he suspects Croak being a creature bred to act as a scout for a planned alien invasion and intimidates her into cooperating with him on a research of their empathic bond. Briefly left alone after a face-to-face with her mother, Renee deliberately breaks her finger again, agitating Croak into escaping captivity and freeing Renee.

Keyes catches up with Renee and Croak, and shoots at them indiscriminately. To protect Renee, Croak breaks cover and rushes Keyes, killing him before collapsing, mortally wounded. The film ends with Renee mourning Croak's demise. In a mid-credits scene, the alien's corpse is studied by CIA forensics until it unexpectedly revives.

== Cast ==
- Lulu Wilson as Renee Rowan
- Garrett van der Leun as Croak
- Wrenn Schmidt as Linda Rowan
- Trae Romano as Gil Lopez
- Omari Hardwick as Jonathan Keyes
- Paul Schneider as Chase Duvall
- Josh Cooke as Agent Browne
- Ron Rogge as Lou
- MJ Wolfe as Huntsman

== Production ==
On April 28, 2023, Lulu Wilson, Omari Hardwick, and Trae Romano are set to star in the film. On April 30, 2023, Kevin Hart was set to produce the film under his Hartbeat production company. Filming commenced at Albuquerque, New Mexico on May 8, 2023. The Henson Company created the film's alien creature.

== Music ==
In June 2025, Ryan Taubert was announced to be composing the score for the film.

== Release ==
In February 2025, Blue Fox Entertainment acquired the distribution rights to the film. The film was released in the United States and Canada on September 19, 2025.
