= Anna Drubich =

- Born: Anna Solovieva Drubich; June 27, 1984 (age 42); Moscow, Russian SFSR, Soviet Union
- Genre: Film score
- Occupations: Composer, pianist, actress
- Instrument: Piano
- Years active: 2002–present
- Spouse: Evgeny Tonkha
- Website: kraft-engel.com/clients/anna-drubich/

Anna Solovieva Drubich (born 27 June 1984) is a Russian composer, pianist, and actress known for her film scores in horror films and frequently working with the composer Marco Beltrami. She has scored over 35 major film and TV projects across the US, Russia, and Europe.

== Early life and education ==
Drubich was born in Moscow, where she began piano lessons at age eight. She studied with Eliso Virsaladze at the Moscow Chopin Music College from 1998 to 2002 and earned her Bachelor's and Master's degrees from the Munich School for the Performing Arts (2002–2008) under Professor Franz Massinger. In 2012, she graduated from the University of Southern California's Scoring for Motion Pictures and Television program. She participated in the Sundance Film Music Lab fellowship in 2018.

== Career ==
Drubich's first film score was for the 2002 Russian film About Love (O Liubvi), composed with Andrei Golovin, which won Best Music at the Kinotavr Film Festival. Early works include scores for Anna Karenina (2010), 2ASSA2 (2010), and Classmates (Odnoklassniki, 2010).

She gained international recognition with horror films such as the Netflix trilogy Fear Street (2021), Scary Stories to Tell in the Dark (2019) produced by Guillermo del Toro, and Werewolves Within (2021). Recent projects include Barbarian (2022), Navalny (2022), The Master and Margarita (2024), and Netflix features Sting and Time Cut (2024).

As a pianist, she has performed in Russia, Ukraine, France, Germany, Italy, Switzerland, and Spain.

== Personal life ==
Drubich is married to Evgeny Tonkha and has two children.

== Awards and nominations ==
- Kinotavr Film Festival: Best Music for About Love (2002)
- Soundtrack Cologne Competition: Special Prize for The Factory (2009)
- NIKA Award: Nominated for Russian Film Academy Award
- Triumph Award: Winner (Russia)
- Nika Award: Best Music for Odessa (2021) and Gipnoz (2021)
- BMI Film Music Awards: Winner for Scary Stories to Tell in the Dark
- Moscow Beethoven Competition: First Prize
- Bremen International Piano Competition: Mozart Prize

== Selected filmography ==
- Scary Stories to Tell in the Dark (2019)
- Fear Street Part Three: 1666 (2021)
- Werewolves Within (2021)
- Barbarian (2022)
- Sting (2024)
- The Master and Margarita (2024)
- Time Cut (2024)
- Forbidden Fruits (2026)
- Corporate Retreat (2026)
- Eurotrash (2026)
