= Barbarian (2022 film) =

Film by Zach Cregger

- Theatrical release poster
- Directed by: Zach Cregger
- Written by: Zach Cregger
- Produced by: Arnon Milchan; Roy Lee; Raphael Margules; J. D. Lifshitz
- Starring: Georgina Campbell; Bill Skarsgård; Justin Long
- Cinematography: Zach Kuperstein
- Edited by: Joe Murphy
- Music by: Anna Drubich
- Production companies: Regency Enterprises; Almost Never Films; Hammerstone Studios; BoulderLight Pictures; Vertigo Entertainment
- Distributed by: 20th Century Studios
- Release dates: July 22, 2022 (SDCC); September 9, 2022 (United States)
- Running time: 103 minutes
- Country: United States
- Language: English
- Budget: $4–4.5 million
- Box office: $46.2 million

Barbarian is a 2022 American horror film written and directed by Zach Cregger in his solo screenwriting and directorial debut. It is produced by Arnon Milchan, Roy Lee, Raphael Margules, and J. D. Lifshitz. The film stars Georgina Campbell, Bill Skarsgård, and Justin Long. The story follows a woman who rents a house on Airbnb and discovers a dark secret inside.

Barbarian premiered at San Diego Comic-Con on July 22, 2022, and was theatrically released in the United States on September 9, 2022, by 20th Century Studios. The film received positive reviews from critics and grossed $46 million worldwide against a budget of about $4 million.

== Plot ==
On the night before a job interview, Tess Marshall arrives at a house she has booked on Airbnb in Brightmoor, Detroit. However, the house has been double-booked and is occupied by a man named Keith. Initially unnerved, Tess warms to Keith and stays while he sleeps on the couch. She awakens in the night to find her bedroom door open, but Keith assures her he did not open it.

At her job interview, the interviewer warns Tess that she is staying in a dangerous neighborhood. As she returns to the house, a homeless stranger runs towards her, urging her to leave, and she hurries inside. She accidentally locks herself in the basement and discovers a hidden room with a camera, a stained mattress, a bucket, and a bloody handprint. Keith returns to the house and frees Tess. Ignoring Tess's warning, he investigates the room. When he does not return, Tess follows and finds a subterranean tunnel, where she finds Keith injured. A naked, deformed woman appears and bashes Keith's skull against a wall, killing him.

Several weeks later, the house's owner, a Hollywood actor named AJ, is fired from a television series following allegations of rape. With mounting legal costs and having been ostracized from the film community, AJ travels to Detroit to inspect the house before listing it for sale. He finds the hidden tunnel and tries to measure it, believing it may increase the house's value. The deformed woman attacks him, and he falls into a pit, where he meets Tess, who is still alive, having been bottle-fed by the creature as its "baby."

In 1982, Frank, the house's original owner, buys supplies for a home birth and stalks a woman. In the present, Tess and AJ are locked in a pit. The woman tries to feed AJ milk from a bottle. Tess urges AJ to drink, explaining that the woman wants them to act like her babies. When AJ refuses, the woman drags him away and forcibly breastfeeds him. Tess escapes with the help of a homeless man, Andre, the stranger from before, who warns her that the woman will come after her at nightfall. With the woman distracted, AJ finds a room that she refuses to approach. Inside, he encounters a bedridden Frank and finds VHS tapes of Frank abducting and raping women. Frank shoots himself with a concealed revolver.

The police dismiss Tess's story, assuming she is intoxicated. She breaks back into the house, retrieves her car keys, and drives into the woman as she leaves the house. Tess returns to the basement to rescue AJ, but he mistakenly shoots her with Frank's revolver. Outside, the woman's body has vanished. Tess and AJ shelter with Andre, who explains that the woman is a product of Frank's multi-generational incest with the daughters he had with his victims.

The woman bursts in, kills Andre, and pursues Tess and AJ up a water tower. AJ loses his gun and pushes Tess off the water tower to "distract" the woman and save himself. The woman jumps after her and shields her from the fall. AJ finds Tess alive, but as he tries to rationalize his actions, the woman awakens and splits his head open. She attempts to comfort Tess, who shoots her dead with Frank's gun before leaving.

== Cast ==
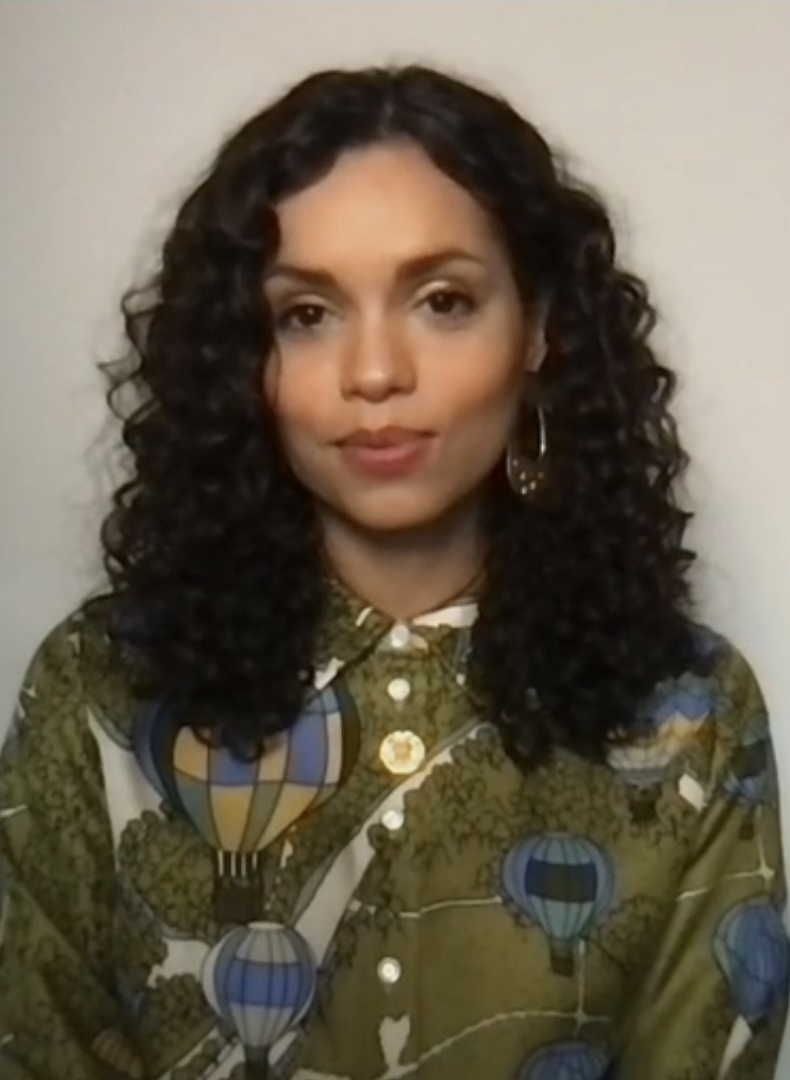
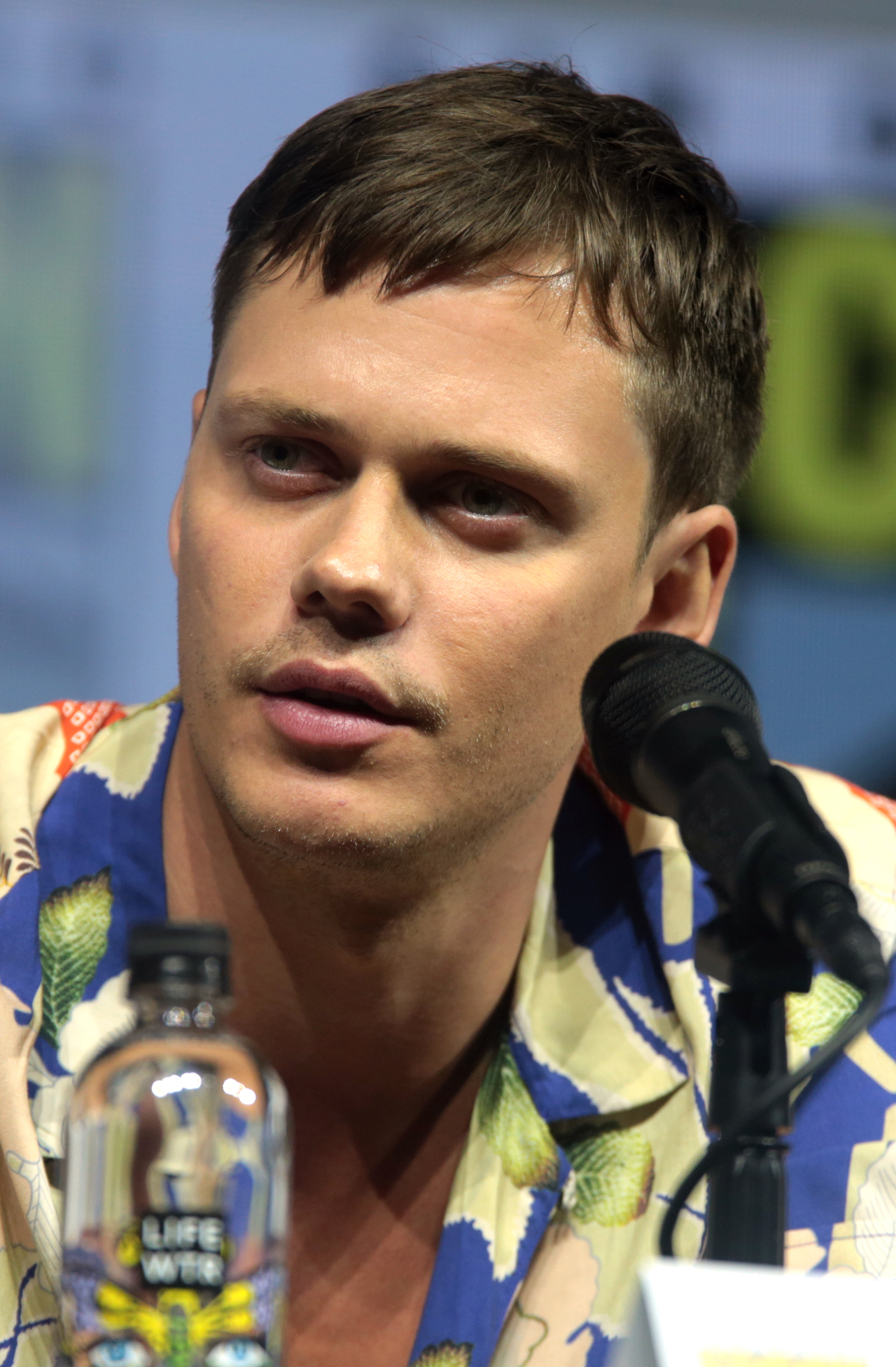
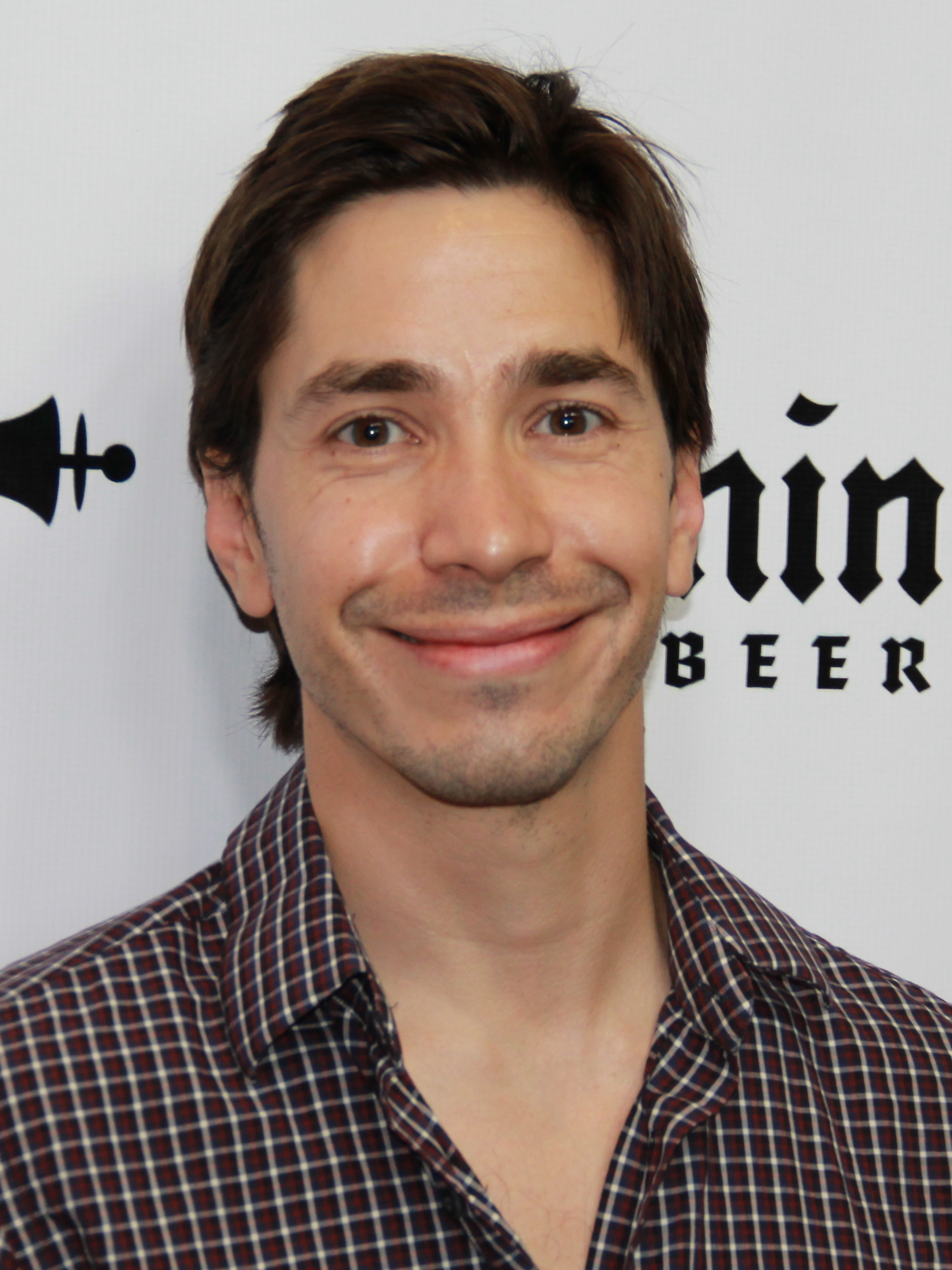
Barbarian stars Georgina Campbell, Bill Skarsgård, and Justin Long.
- Georgina Campbell as Tess
- Bill Skarsgård as Keith
- Justin Long as AJ
- Matthew Patrick Davis as the Mother
- Richard Brake as Frank
- Kurt Braunohler as Doug
- Jaymes Butler as Andre
- Sophie Sörensen as Bonnie
- J.R. Esposito as Jeff
- Kate Nichols as Catherine
- Brooke Dillman as AJ's mother
- Will Greenberg as Robert
- Zach Cregger as Everett
- Kate Bosworth as Melissa (voice cameo)
- Sara Paxton as nursing video narration / assistant / Megan (voice cameo)

== Production ==
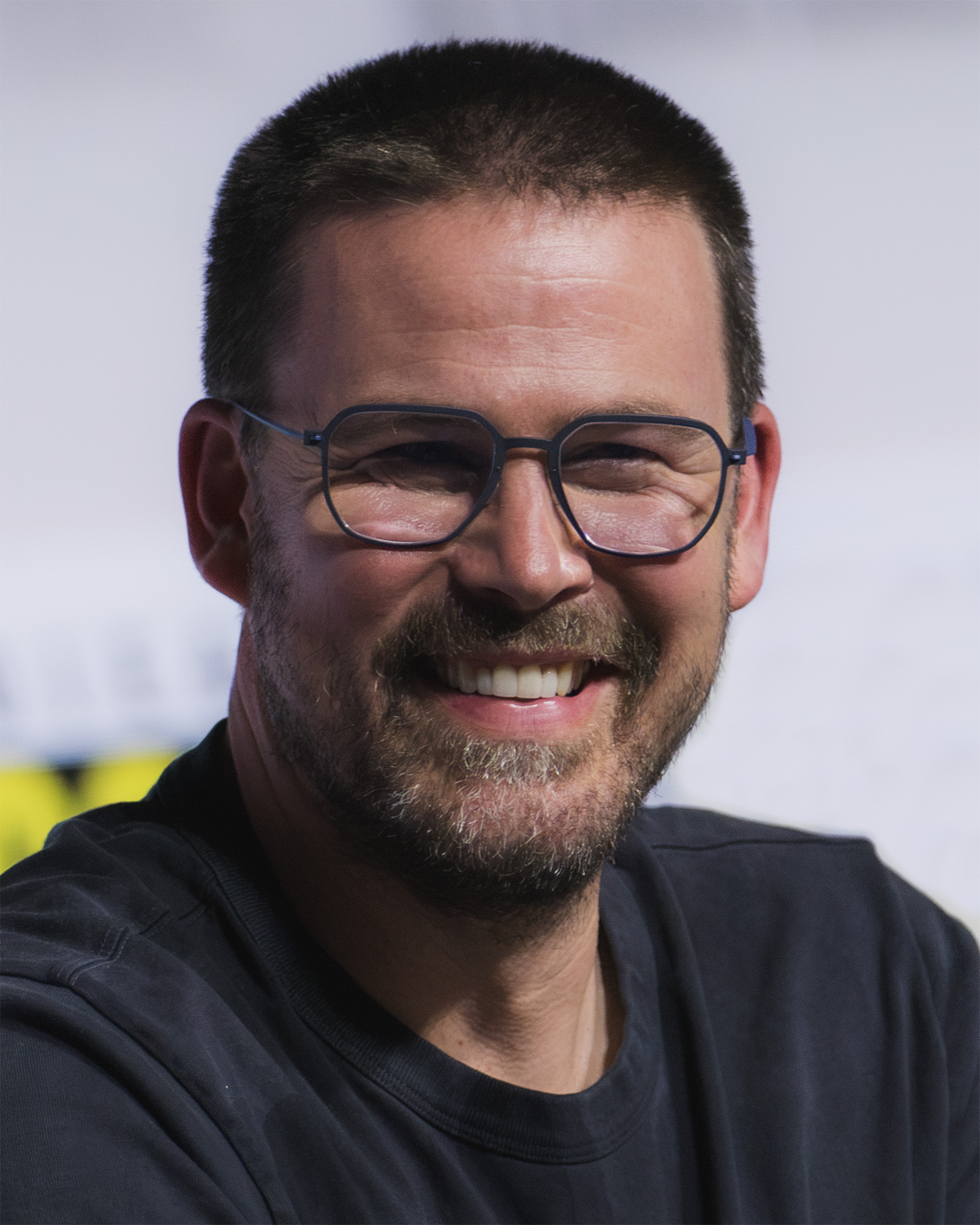
Writer and director Zach Cregger

Zach Cregger was inspired by the non-fiction book The Gift of Fear, citing a section that encourages women to trust their intuition and not ignore the subconscious red flags that arise in their day-to-day interactions with men. He sat down to write a single thirty-page scene that would incorporate as many of these red flags as possible. Cregger settled on a woman showing up to an Airbnb late at night, only to find that it had been double-booked, as the ideal set-up for this exercise. He stuck to the rule that if he was surprising himself with his writing, then he has to be surprising his audience. "As long as I have no long plan, then no one could know what's coming."

Cregger eventually became frustrated during the writing process, fearing the direction of the story was too predictable. With no forethought, he subsequently decided to introduce a twist that would "flip [the scene] on its head."

I just wanted to write a fun scene for myself and it ended up being something that hooked me, and I didn't know where it was going, and then it turned into a feature film.

While writing the screenplay, Cregger named the film Barbarian as a placeholder. As the story progressed, the name eventually became the title of the film.

Early in pre-production, Cregger reportedly reached out to multiple financiers and distributors, including A24 and Neon, but was rejected. J. D. Lifshitz and Raphael Margules agreed to produce the film through their BoulderLight Pictures banner, and were later joined by Vertigo Entertainment, after Lifshitz and Margules reached out to Vertigo's Roy Lee who had served as an early mentor to the duo. In mid-2020, Lifshitz and Margules accrued a $3.5 million budget for the film, largely through foreign financing, most of it from the French production company Logical Pictures.

Zac Efron was the first choice to play AJ, whom Cregger had envisioned as a "beefcake kind of himbo." However, when Efron turned down the role, Cregger decided to take the character's image in a different direction and cast Justin Long for his "warm and disarming and charming, lovable presence onscreen" which he thought would make AJ more engaging to audiences.

That same year, Lee brought in Bill Skarsgård, who had previously collaborated with Lee on It (2017) and It Chapter Two (2019), to costar and serve as an executive producer. Barbarian began principal photography in early 2021 in Bulgaria. The film was shot in Sofia, while exterior neighborhood shots beyond the house's block were filmed in the Brightmoor neighborhood of Detroit. In April 2021, Logical's founder and the film's main financier, Eric Tavitian, died of cancer. Unsure of the film's future, Lee secured financial backing from New Regency who increased the budget to $4.5 million, and as a result, 20th Century Studios became the film's distributor, stemming from a prior distribution deal between Regency and The Walt Disney Studios, 20th Century's parent division.

== Music ==
Barbarian (Original Motion Picture Soundtrack)

Soundtrack album by Anna Drubich
- Released: December 9, 2022
- Length: 25:48
- Language: English
- Label: Hollywood Records

By June 2022, Anna Drubich was hired to compose the film's score. The soundtrack album was released by Hollywood Records on December 9, 2022.

All tracks are written by Anna Drubich.

Track listing
No.	Title	Length
1.	"The House"	0:42
2.	"Goddamit"	0:32
3.	"Wake Up Keith"	1:34
4.	"Job Interview"	2:00
5.	"Rope Nope"	0:59
6.	"Down the Tunnel"	3:18
7.	"Keith's End"	0:44
8.	"At the Airport"	0:48
9.	"Basement"	1:43
10.	"Lullaby"	0:56
11.	"Breastfeeding"	2:34
12.	"The Bottle"	2:50
13.	"The Bell"	2:15
14.	"Leaving the House"	1:20
15.	"Silo"	1:56
16.	"Goodbye"	1:37
Total length:		25:48

== Themes and interpretations ==
Barbarian has been characterized as having themes related to sexual abuse, incest, and trauma, and, owing to the book by which Cregger was inspired, themes of different forms of misogyny. Writing for Film School Rejects, Aurora Amidon asserted that the film is essentially about "the ripple effects of abuse", concerning the characters of AJ and Frank—who, in the habit of harming women for their own pleasure, are cut from the same cloth.

== Release ==
=== Marketing ===
The first trailer for Barbarian was released on June 23, 2022, and appeared at the front of theatrical showings of The Black Phone. According to Margules, Disney marketed the film to "feel like a discovery" and teasing very little of the film's plot in promotional materials.

=== Theatrical release ===
Barbarian was originally scheduled to be theatrically released in the United States by 20th Century Studios on August 12, 2022, before being rescheduled to be released on August 31, and later September 9. Disney reportedly maintained a theatrical release for Barbarian (as opposed to a streaming release on Hulu) due to strong, positive reception from studio test screenings.

CinemaBlend and AMC Theatres premiered the film at the 2022 San Diego Comic-Con on July 22, where it garnered positive reactions. The film was also screened at the Arrow Video FrightFest on August 29. The film was released on October 20, 2022, in Australia, on October 27 in New Zealand, and on October 28 in the United Kingdom.

=== Home media ===
Barbarian was released in the United States for digital download and streaming on HBO Max on October 25, 2022. The film became available on Star+ in Latin America and on Disney+ via the Star content hub in other international territories on October 26, 2022. In the United Kingdom, it was released on Disney+ as part of the Star hub on December 14, 2022. An album featuring Anna Drubich's score for the film was released by Hollywood Records on December 9, 2022. The film's distributor, 20th Century Studios, declined to release the film on physical home media after its theatrical release despite lobbying by director Zach Cregger. On June 25, 2026, 20th Century Studios announced that the film would receive its first physical release on August 11, 2026, as a limited-edition 4K Ultra HD and Blu-ray SteelBook. The release includes an audio commentary by Cregger and producer Roy Lee, a featurette titled "Behind Barbarian", and deleted scenes.

The streaming aggregator Reelgood, which tracks real-time data from 5 million U.S. users for original and acquired content across SVOD and AVOD services, reported that Barbarian was the fifth-most-watched program across all platforms during the week of October 26, 2022. Whip Media, which tracks viewership data for the more than 21 million worldwide users of its TV Time app, calculated that it was the most-streamed film in the U.S. during the week ending October 30. It subsequently ranked sixth during the week ending November 13. JustWatch, a guide to streaming content with access to data from more than 20 million users around the world, announced that Barbarian was the second most streamed film in the U.S. between October 31 and November 6. Barbarian was the eighth most-streamed horror film in Canada during the Halloween period between October 1, 2022, and October 13, 2025, according to JustWatch.

== Reception ==
=== Box office ===
Barbarian grossed $40.8 million in the United States and Canada, and $5.3 million in other territories, for a worldwide total of $46.2 million, against a production budget of $4.5 million.

In the United States and Canada, Barbarian was released alongside Brahmāstra: Part One – Shiva and Lifemark, and made $3.9 million from 2,340 theaters on its first day, including $850,000 from Thursday night previews. It went on to debut to $10 million, topping the box office; 59% of the audience was male, with 74% being between 18 and 34. The film made $6.3 million in its second weekend, finishing behind newcomer The Woman King. Deadline Hollywood called the 40% week-to-week drop "pretty spectacular", noting that horror films typically see a 65% decline in their sophomore frames. The film was added to 550 theaters in its third weekend and made $4.8 million, finishing fourth at the box office.

=== Critical response ===
On the review aggregator website Rotten Tomatoes, 92% of 207 critics' reviews are positive, with an average rating of 7.5/10. The website's consensus reads: "Smart, darkly humorous and above all scary, Barbarian offers a chilling and consistently unpredictable thrill ride for horror fans." Metacritic, which uses a weighted average, assigned the film a score of 78 out of 100, based on 38 critics, indicating "generally favorable" reviews. Audiences polled by CinemaScore gave the film an average grade of "C+" on an A+ to F scale, while those at PostTrak gave the film a 70% overall positive score, with 54% saying they would definitely recommend it.

=== Accolades ===
The film was one of the works that received the ReFrame Stamp for the years 2022 to 2023. The stamp is awarded by the gender equity coalition ReFrame and industry database IMDbPro for film and television projects that are proven to have gender-balanced hiring, with stamps being awarded to projects that hire women, especially women of color, in four out of eight key roles for their production.

Year	Award	Category	Nominee(s)	Result	Ref.
2022	Portland Critics Association Awards	Best Horror Feature	Barbarian	Won	
2023	Phoenix Critics Circle	Best Horror Film	Barbarian	Won	
2023	Hollywood Critics Association Awards	Best Horror Film	Barbarian	Nominated	
2023	Critics' Choice Super Awards	Best Horror Movie	Barbarian	Won	
2023	Critics' Choice Super Awards	Best Actor in a Horror Movie	Justin Long	Nominated	
2023	Fangoria Chainsaw Awards	Best Wide-Release Film	Barbarian	Nominated	
2023	Fangoria Chainsaw Awards	Best Supporting Performance	Justin Long	Nominated	
2023	Fangoria Chainsaw Awards	Best Director	Zach Cregger	Nominated	
2023	Fangoria Chainsaw Awards	Best Screenplay	Zach Cregger	Nominated	
2023	Fangoria Chainsaw Awards	Best Makeup FX	Lyudmil Ivanov	Nominated	
2023	Golden Trailer Awards	Best Horror/Thriller Trailer Byte for a Feature Film	Barbarian	Won	

== Future ==
In October 2023, it was announced the film would receive a video game adaptation from Diversion3 Entertainment, who previously worked on video games based on Friday the 13th and Evil Dead.
