= The Wrath of Becky =

2023 film by Matt Angel and Suzanne Coote

- Theatrical release poster
- Directed by: Matt Angel; Suzanne Coote
- Screenplay by: Matt Angel
- Story by: Matt Angel; Suzanne Coote
- Based on: Characters by: Nick Morris; Lane Skye; Ruckus Skye
- Produced by: Jordan Yale Levine; Jordan Beckerman; Russ Posternak; Raphael Margules; J.D. Lifshitz; Tracy Rosenblum; Chadd Harbold
- Starring: Lulu Wilson; Seann William Scott
- Cinematography: Julia Swain
- Edited by: Stephen Boyer
- Music by: Nima Fakhrara
- Production companies: Post Film; BoulderLight Pictures
- Distributed by: Quiver Distribution
- Release dates: March 11, 2023 (SXSW); May 26, 2023 (United States)
- Running time: 83 minutes
- Country: United States
- Language: English
- Box office: $207,118

The Wrath of Becky is a 2023 American action thriller film directed by Matt Angel and Suzanne Coote. Angel wrote the screenplay based on a story he co-authored with Coote. The film is the second installment in the Becky film series, and serves a sequel to the 2020 original. Featuring a cast which includes Lulu Wilson returning as the eponymous Becky, the movie also includes a supporting cast alongside Seann William Scott.

The Wrath of Becky premiered at the South by Southwest film festival on March 11, 2023. It was released in the United States on May 26, 2023. The film received positive reviews from critics.

== Plot ==
Three years after four Neo-Nazis invaded her family's lake house and killed her father, 16-year-old Becky has escaped from several foster homes. She now lives off the grid. Eventually, Becky and her dog Diego settle in with Elena Cahn, a matronly woman who treats Becky like a daughter and does not pry about her past.

Anthony, DJ, and Sean, three members of an extremist group called the Noble Men, stop at the diner where Becky works. Angered by their insulting misogyny, Becky dumps a cup of hot coffee on Anthony's lap. The three secretly follow her and break into Elena's house. As the situation escalates, Anthony shoots Elena in the head, knocks Becky unconscious, and takes Diego. Waking up, Becky vows to find Diego and take revenge for Elena's death.

Recalling the men mentioning a Darryl, Becky finds two local addresses linked to that name. In the first one, she finds an elderly woman named Darryl. The second is a remote cabin where Noble Men cell leader Darryl hosts a meeting with Anthony, DJ, Sean, and Twig, another militia member. Sneaking into the cabin, Becky learns that the next day's town hall protest will be an armed insurrection against Senator Hernandez. She steals a thumb drive containing information of people associated with the Noble Men.

Becky leaves a cellphone on Darryl's doorstep to taunt the men. Anthony, DJ, and Sean are forced to confess to stealing Diego, but they kept quiet about having murdered Elena.

Darryl makes Anthony go after Becky. Becky leads Anthony into a hidden pit in the forest. She then rigs Anthony with a grenade trap that blows up his head when Darryl reopens the front door. After Darryl turns his gun on them to demand the truth about Becky, DJ and Sean finally reveal Elena's murder for real. Realizing that the rally will actually be a violent insurrection, Sean tries to abandon the group, but Darryl kills him.

Becky calls Darryl to continue taunting him. She threatens to expose the plot against Hernandez and also reveals that she stole Darryl's incriminating thumb drive. Twig goes outside looking for Becky. Becky fires a crossbow bolt through Twig's cheeks. Fearful of both Becky and Darryl, DJ drives away in their truck.

Twig and Becky have a faceoff ending with Becky using a machete to kill Twig. However, Darryl uses a tranquilizer dart to take her captive.

Becky wakes to find herself tied to a chair. Darryl shows Becky that he stole her keepsake key, and that a hidden shaft inside its cylinder contains engraved numbers he presumes to be coordinates. The elderly woman Becky previously met reveals herself to be Darryl's mother as well as the secret mastermind behind the Noble Men. Darryl Sr. arrives at the cabin and uses Diego to taunt Becky while demanding to know where the thumb drive is.

Becky breaks free from her restraints and sprays Darryl with bear spray. He leaves the room to recover. Darryl Sr. moves to shoot Diego, but Becky throws a knife into her forehead. Darryl Jr. chases Becky into the forest outside. Becky leads Darryl into animal traps that pin his legs and clamp around his throat. He whispers "Well done" and dies. Becky retrieves her key. Becky returns to the cabin for Diego and discovers that Darryl Sr. survived. Darryl Sr. tries to shoot Becky, but cannot aim properly due to her head injury, allowing Becky to have Diego maul her to death.

Twenty-four hours later, CIA agent Kate Montana interviews Becky about the thumb drive and singlehandedly taking down a Noble Men cell. Agent Montana offers to recruit Becky, who agrees. Montana then asks if Becky is ready to find out what her key belongs to.

DJ tries to get back on the road after his truck breaks down when a law enforcement vehicle pulls over behind him. He reaches for a gun to confront the officer, but sees that it is Becky, dressed in a black suit and aiming a rocket launcher at him. She fires at DJ, blowing up his truck and killing him.

== Cast ==
- Lulu Wilson as Becky
- Seann William Scott as Darryl Jr.
- Denise Burse as Elena
- Jill Larson as Darryl Sr.
- Michael Sirow as Anthony
- Aaron Dalla Villa as DJ
- Matt Angel as Sean
- Courtney Gains as Twig
- Pac Williams as Diego
- Alison Cimmet as Alice
- Derek Gaines as Ted
- John D. Hickman as Steve
- Kate Siegel as Agent Montana
- Zoie Morris as Charmain

== Production ==
=== Development ===
Matt Angel and Suzanne Coote were approached to write and direct a sequel to Becky in December 2021 by producer J.D. Lifshitz. Given no further direction and only three weeks to write the script, Angel watched Kill Bill for guidance in the film's tone and characters. Lulu Wilson worked closely with the filmmakers to soften the edges of Becky. Having two years pass between films, Wilson hoped to see a more mature iteration of the character. Inspired by films like Kick-Ass and the filmography of Edgar Wright, the filmmakers adopted a more comedic tone for the sequel. The duo worked to toe the line between the "comic book levity" elements and the "apparent" dangerousness of the film's threats. In June 2022, the film was officially announced under the title Becky 2: The Wrath of Becky. Seann William Scott was revealed to be playing the film's villain, as well as serving as an executive producer alongside Wilson. Nick Morris, co-writer on the first film, and directing pair Jonathan Milot and Cary Murnion were also on board as executive producers.

=== Filming ===
Production took place in secret in New Jersey, spanning 18 days. Additional filming occurred in the town of Scotch Plains in early June. Angel and Coote, as well as their cinematographer Julia Swain, decided to drop the hand-held methods of filming utilized in the previous film and instead use slicker camera movements and steadicam.

== Release ==
The Wrath of Becky debuted at the South by Southwest film festival on March 11, 2023. The film, previously expected to release in early 2023, was distributed by Quiver Distribution on May 26, 2023.

== Reception ==
On the review aggregator website Rotten Tomatoes, 89% of 57 critics' reviews are positive, with an average rating of 6.9/10. The website's consensus reads: "Bringing Lulu Wilson back for another round of whooping on bad guys, this Wrath is one Becky with the good sequel." Metacritic, which uses a weighted average, assigned the film a score of 51 out of 100, based on 9 critics, indicating "mixed or average" reviews.

Meagan Navarro of Bloody Disgusting praised the comedic shift in tone, calling the film an "irreverently delightful time". For RogerEbert.com, Brian Tallerico found the film to be an improvement over its predecessor, writing, "Angel & Coote know how to pace and deliver this kind of gut punch of a movie." Anton Bitel of Little White Lies called The Wrath of Becky "bloody satisfaction" while critiquing the film as "filler" for another sequel. Matt Donato, writing for /Film, said the film is "a fun-filled slaughter-fest, even considering the lulls before Becky unleashes her fury."

Kate Erbland of IndieWire said, "Kills are gruesome and clever, Wilson is a wonder, the bad guys all deserve what's coming, and it all feels undercooked."

== Sequel ==
In March 2023, Matt Angel stated that there are ongoing discussions for a third Becky film. By May of the same year, Wilson confirmed development for a sequel, while expressing hopes that Kate Siegel will reprise her role from the second installment. Confirming that the end of The Wrath of Becky is intended to set up events of a sequel, the actress further stated that she, the co-directors, and the producers are discussing the story of the next film, while reporting that Siegel has expressed interest in the project.

In February 2026, it was revealed that principal photography had wrapped in Northern Ireland. Directed by Jenn Wexler, Matt Angel served as screenwriter from an original story he co-authored with Suzanne Coote. The plot will include the CIA's recruitment of Becky to operate as a field agent working undercover to infiltrate a corrupt family of innkeepers running a tourist attraction at Adolf Hitler's WWII bunker named the Wolf's Lair, where she must take a stand upon learning that the group plans to create a Fourth Reich. In addition to serving as an executive producer, Lulu Wilson will reprise her starring role; while Neil Patrick Harris, Brandon Flynn, James Urbaniak, and Kate Segal feature as the supporting cast. Russ Posternak, Chadd Harbold, Larry Greenberg, Paul Kennedy, Aideen Hand, Jordan Yale Levine, and Jordan Beckerman serve as producers; the project is a joint-venture production between BoulderLight Pictures, Post Film, Quiver Films, Village Films, Creativity Capital, Media Finance Capital and Northern Ireland Screen. Quiver Distribution will release the movie theatrically in the summer of 2026.
