= Woman of the Hour =

2023 film by Anna Kendrick

- Release poster
- Directed by: Anna Kendrick
- Written by: Ian McDonald
- Produced by: Roy Lee; Miri Yoon; J. D. Lifshitz; Raphael Margules
- Starring: Anna Kendrick; Daniel Zovatto; Nicolette Robinson; Tony Hale
- Cinematography: Zach Kuperstein
- Edited by: Andrew Canny
- Music by: Dan Romer; Mike Tuccillo
- Production companies: AGC Studios; Vertigo Entertainment; BoulderLight Pictures
- Distributed by: Netflix
- Release dates: September 8, 2023 (TIFF); October 18, 2024 (United States)
- Running time: 94 minutes
- Country: United States
- Language: English

Woman of the Hour is a 2023 American crime thriller film directed by Anna Kendrick in her directorial debut and written by Ian McDonald. It is based on the true story of Rodney Alcala, a contestant on an episode of television show The Dating Game in 1978 who was later discovered to be a serial killer. The film stars Kendrick as Dating Game contestant Sheryl Bradshaw and Daniel Zovatto as Alcala, along with Nicolette Robinson and Tony Hale in supporting roles.

Woman of the Hour had its world premiere at the Toronto International Film Festival on September 8, 2023, and was released by Netflix on October 18, 2024.

== Plot ==
The film's storylines alternate between Rodney Alcala's crimes in different locations from 1971 to 1979 and Sheryl Bradshaw's life in 1978 Los Angeles which leads to the two meeting on The Dating Game.

In 1977, Rodney photographs a woman on the plains of Wyoming. After he gets her to open up about a recent painful breakup, he strangles her unconscious, revives her, and then strangles her to death. In 1971, Charlie is a flight attendant moving into a new apartment in New York City. She sees Rodney taking photos across the street and asks him to help her move furniture into her apartment. After he helps her, Rodney assaults and kills Charlie.

In 1978, Pennsylvania native Sheryl Bradshaw is a struggling actress attending auditions in Los Angeles. Her agent urges her to appear on television as a contestant on The Dating Game, saying it will raise her visibility in the industry. Although Sheryl thinks the show is shallow and lacks substance, she reluctantly agrees and goes to the studio to tape an episode. The show goes live, with the three bachelors hidden from Sheryl's view behind a partition. "Bachelor #3" is revealed to be Rodney.

Laura, a member of the studio audience, recognizes Rodney as the man she saw with her friend, Alison, just before Alison was raped and murdered on the beach. She relates her suspicions about Bachelor #3 to her boyfriend, but he dismisses Laura's concerns, saying she could be mistaken and that producers likely vet contestants. She asks to speak to a producer, but a security guard purposefully misdirects her to a janitor instead.

As the show goes on, Sheryl decides to go off-script, feeling the written questions she is supposed to ask the bachelors are sexist and insulting. Rodney, having made a better impression than Bachelors #1 and #2, is crowned the "winner", the prize being a weekend trip upstate to Carmel-by-the-Sea with Sheryl.

After the taping, Rodney and Sheryl go out for drinks. He tries to ingratiate himself with her by showing familiarity with the plays she talks about, but when she playfully teases him, his mood changes, leaving her uncomfortable. When they leave the bar, Rodney insists on walking with Sheryl back to her car at the studio. He asks for her phone number and realizes she has given him a fake one. She tells him she has no interest in going on the date with him to Carmel, and he threatens her.

Sheryl anxiously races to get inside her car and is nearly attacked by Rodney in the deserted parking lot. As a group of people exit the studio, Rodney walks away, and she escapes. The next day, Laura tries to report Rodney's appearance on the show to the police but is dismissed when she cannot name him or the officer she talked to after her friend was murdered. Some time after her Dating Game experience, Sheryl thanks her agent on the phone and leaves California.

In early 1979, in San Gabriel, California, teenage runaway Amy lives on the streets and steals occasionally. Rodney spots her sitting under a staircase and claims he can help her launch a career as a model. She agrees to accompany him, and they drive to an isolated location in the desert. At sunset, Rodney proceeds to photograph Amy and then attacks her. Amy awakens in the desert after being bound, raped, and beaten as Rodney lies next to her, crying. Amy acts as if she is embarrassed by the situation and asks him to please not tell anyone what happened, to keep it a secret. When they stop at a gas station, she flees, and police arrive and arrest Rodney.

A postscript states that Alcala was released on bail following his arrest while awaiting trial, during which he murdered another woman and a young girl. He was rearrested in July 1979 and was eventually found to have murdered at least seven women and girls, though the true number could be over a hundred. After 31 years behind bars, he had a chance of acquittal at trial, but an adult Amy showed up and testified against him. He would later die in prison.

== Cast ==
- Anna Kendrick as Sheryl Bradshaw
- Daniel Zovatto as Rodney Alcala / Bachelor #3
- Tony Hale as Ed Burke
- Nicolette Robinson as Laura
- Pete Holmes as Terry
- Autumn Best as Amy
- Kathryn Gallagher as Charlie
- Kelley Jakle as Sarah
- Matt Visser as Bachelor #1
- Jedidiah Goodacre as Bachelor #2
- Dylan Schmid as Mario

== Production ==
In December 2017, Ian MacAllister McDonald's screenplay Rodney and Sheryl was featured on the Black List, an annual survey of the most popular scripts yet to be produced. In May 2021, Netflix announced it had bought a package around McDonald's script with Chloe Okuno on board as director and Anna Kendrick attached to star.

In April 2022, with Netflix no longer attached, the film was sold at the Cannes Film Festival. Kendrick was now on board as director and producer, as well as appearing as Sheryl Bradshaw. The working title of the project was The Dating Game. Kendrick donated her pay to the Rape, Abuse & Incest National Network and the National Center for Victims of Crime so that she did not profit from accounts of sexual violence victims. In December 2022, a producer sued another producer for alleged fraud and breach of contract; The Dating Game was one of three films mentioned in the lawsuit.

Principal photography took place in Vancouver, British Columbia, with Zach Kuperstein as cinematographer and Paul Barbeau as Executive Producer from October to December 2022.

== Release ==
Woman of the Hour premiered at the Toronto International Film Festival on September 8, 2023. Kendrick and the cast were unable to attend because they needed to respect the 2023 SAG-AFTRA strike. Shortly after, Netflix, which had intended to distribute the film worldwide early in the project's development, reacquired distribution rights to the United States, as well as some international territories, for $11 million.

The film was released on the streamer on October 18, 2024.

== Reception ==
=== Critical response ===
On the review aggregator website Rotten Tomatoes, 91% of 178 critics' reviews are positive, with an average rating of 7.4/10. The website's consensus reads: "Deftly directed by star Anna Kendrick, Woman of the Hour uses an incredible true story as the foundation for a powerful examination of the intersection between systemic misogyny and violence." Metacritic, which uses a weighted average, assigned the film a score of 74 out of 100, based on 35 critics, indicating "generally favorable" reviews.

Marya E. Gates of RogerEbert.com rated the film 4 out of 4 stars, praising Kendrick's "typically intelligent and spunky performance" as Sheryl, and her "keen curiosity about the power of the gaze, both cinematic and human" as the film's director. The Observer's Wendy Ide gave the film 4 out of 5 stars. She praised Kendrick's ability to capture period details that extend beyond aesthetics and fashion, and highlights her exploration of the deeply rooted sexism in the entertainment industry and broader culture of the era.

Benjamin Lee of The Guardian rated the film 4 out of 5 stars, calling it a "fascinating and frightening stranger-than-fiction tale" and noting its unusual choice for Kendrick’s directorial debut. He acknowledges the script is blunt at times but appreciates its ability to create a "believably discomfitting world for women at the time, when nakedly misogynistic behaviour was even more commonplace". Lee highlights Kendrick's balance in depicting Alcala's violence while humanizing his victims, allowing the audience to understand the brutality without explicit imagery while maintaining shock value. He also points out that the film includes moments of dark comedy that effectively highlight the absurdity of the situation but can sometimes feel discordant and too modern for the context.

Writing for Vulture, Bilge Ebiri critiqued the film, finding it less compelling than expected. He states the film ultimately feels "a bit too careful: composed but also more than a little academic" and that it "winds up existing mostly as a series of well-staged scenes all wrapped up in a bow that tells us the world is not safe out there" without offering significant new insight.

The New York Times's Alissa Wilkinson praises the "competently handled" directorial debut's smooth storytelling as well as Kendrick’s performance. She noted that while the film's drama is both effective and infuriating, it becomes overly "self-consciously illustrative" midway through, with characters feeling more like archetypes than fully realized individuals. Wilkinson concludes her review by affirming that the film is worth watching; she highlights its avoidance of any fascination with Alcala, who is presented as a perpetrator rather than as an object of psychological interest.

== Themes ==
Woman of the Hour explores the entrenched sexism within the entertainment industry and broader culture of the era. It critiques the societal structures that enabled Alcala, emphasizing how seemingly innocuous sexism and misogyny normalize violence against women, potentially leading to escalated harm. Marya E. Gates of RogerEbert.com notes that the film's visual language could be seen as a critique of true crime films, "which often seem to revel in recreating this violence". The film also examines how women are frequently compelled to perform charm and compliance to navigate perilous situations.

In her review of the film, Alissa Wilkinson of The New York Times referenced a frequently cited quotation, often paraphrased from Margaret Atwood, which posits that "men are afraid women will laugh at them, while women are afraid men will murder them". She asserts that Woman of the Hour embodies this sentiment, presenting it as "this maxim in the form of a feature-length movie".

== Accolades ==
Award	Date of ceremony	Category	Nominee(s)	Result	Ref.
Palm Springs International Film Festival	January 4, 2024	Directors to Watch	Anna Kendrick	Won	
Australian Screen Editors Awards	November 30, 2024	Avid Award for Best Editing in Feature Drama	Andy Canny	Won	
Australian Screen Editors Awards	November 30, 2024	Netflix Award for Technical Excellence	Veronica Buhagiar	Won	
Astra Film Awards	December 8, 2024	Best First Feature	Anna Kendrick	Won	
San Diego Film Critics Society Awards	December 9, 2024	Best First Feature	Anna Kendrick	Nominated	
Las Vegas Film Critics Society	December 13, 2024	Breakout Filmmaker of the Year	Anna Kendrick	Nominated	
St. Louis Film Critics Association	December 15, 2024	Best First Feature	Anna Kendrick	Nominated	
Toronto Film Critics Association	December 15, 2024	Best First Feature	Anna Kendrick	Won	
DiscussingFilm Global Critic Award	January 4, 2025	Best Debut Feature	Anna Kendrick	Nominated	
Online Film Critics Society	January 27, 2025	Best Debut Feature	Anna Kendrick	Nominated	
Golden Trailer Awards	May 29, 2025	Best Thriller	"Seen" (Netflix / Buddha Jones)	Nominated	
Leo Awards	July 23, 2025	Best Make-Up in a Motion Picture	Naomi Bakstad, Michelle Pedersen and Emelie Qvick	Nominated	
Leo Awards	July 23, 2025	Best Hairstyling in a Feature Length Drama	Andrea Simpson, Danna Rutherford, Alesha Kabatoff and Anna Quinn	Won	
