= Running with the Devil =

- Directed by: Jason Cabell
- Written by: Jason Cabell
- Produced by: Michael Mendelsohn; Jim Steele
- Starring: Nicolas Cage; Laurence Fishburne; Leslie Bibb; Barry Pepper
- Cinematography: Cory Geryak
- Edited by: Jordan Goldman
- Music by: Reinhold Heil
- Production companies: Patriot Pictures; Saturn Films
- Distributed by: Quiver Distribution; Redbox Entertainment
- Release date: September 20, 2019 (United States)
- Running time: 100 minutes
- Country: United States
- Language: English
- Box office: $111,218

Running with the Devil is a 2019 American crime thriller film written and directed by Jason Cabell and starring Nicolas Cage, Laurence Fishburne, Leslie Bibb and Barry Pepper. It is Cabell's directorial debut.

It was released in the United States on September 20, 2019, by Quiver Distribution and Redbox Entertainment.

== Plot ==
When a cocaine shipment is compromised to the dismay of the business's masterminds, a chain of events is set in motion to understand the root of the problem. The Cook and The Man are entrusted with the mission to track the supply chain and identify the point of failure.

As they trace the journey of the drugs, moving from the fields to the processing facilities, and then crossing borders to reach the distributors, they encounter numerous obstacles. The Cook, known for his meticulous nature, is a high-ranking operative, while The Man, a veteran trafficker, brings his streetwise tactics to the operation. Along the way, they cross paths with a host of characters representing different facets of the drug trade – from farmers to brokers, and from dealers to enforcers.

As they move closer to discovering the truth, the duo finds themselves navigating a world filled with greed, betrayal, and extreme danger. The labyrinthine network of the drug trade exposes them to the harsh realities of this underground world, where loyalty is scarce and life is cheap.

The DEA, under the charge of Agent in Charge and her right hand known as The Sniper, are concurrently conducting an operation to bring down this drug cartel. This puts them on a collision course with The Cook and The Man, setting the stage for a tense and potentially explosive confrontation.

As the net tightens around the various players involved in the drug trade, a tale of survival unfolds, with individuals caught in the crossfire attempting to protect their own interests. In a world where lines between good and evil are often blurred, a race against time ensues, with everyone trying to salvage what they can before the inevitable showdown.

== Cast ==
- Nicolas Cage as The Cook
- Laurence Fishburne as The Man
- Leslie Bibb as Agent In Charge
- Barry Pepper as The Boss
- Adam Goldberg as The Snitch
- Clifton Collins Jr. as The Farmer
- Cole Hauser as The Executioner
- Peter Facinelli as Number One
- Natalia Reyes as The Woman
- Marie Wagenman as The Child
- Christian Tappan as Trey
- Camilo Amores as Young Man

== Production ==
Filming began in Albuquerque, New Mexico on March 13, 2018, then moved to Bogotá, Colombia on April 2 and wrapped on April 18.

== Reception ==
The review aggregator Rotten Tomatoes reported that 25% of critics gave the film positive reviews, based on 24 reviews, with an average rating of 4.4/10. On Metacritic, the film has a weighted average rating of 42 out of 100, based on 7 critics, indicating "mixed or average reviews".
