= Vertigo Entertainment =

American film and television production company

- Logo used since 2017
- Industry: Film production Television production
- Founded: 2001; 25 years ago
- Founder: Roy Lee; Doug Davison
- Headquarters: Los Angeles, California, United States

Vertigo Entertainment is an American film and television production company based in Los Angeles, founded in 2001 by Roy Lee and Doug Davison.

== History ==
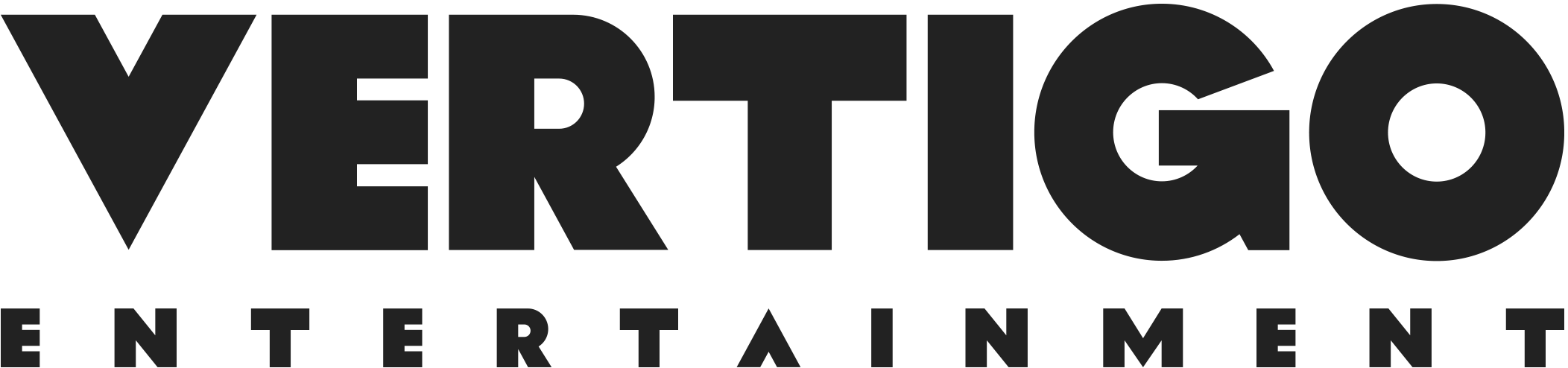
Logo used from 2015 to 2019

In 2001, after leaving film production company BenderSpink, Roy Lee started Vertigo Entertainment with partner Doug Davison.

Originally, Vertigo Entertainment signed a first-look deal with Dimension Films to produce its feature films for three years.

In 2004, Vertigo signed a deal with Universal Pictures to produce many films per year. The deal was later terminated in 2008 during the 2007-08 Writers Guild of America strike. In 2007, the studio signed a deal with Lionsgate Television to produce shows for television.

In 2010, Vertigo signed a first-look deal with Warner Bros. to produce films.

In March 2013, Vertigo signed a two-year first-look deal with Fox 21 to develop projects for cable.

In December 2015, Vertigo expanded their partnership with Warner Bros. to include a two-year exclusive deal for drama and comedy series.

In November 2017, Vertigo signed a multi-year first-look deal with Sony Pictures Television, including drama, comedy and unscripted programs for network, cable and streaming.

In 2020, Vertigo signed a deal with Lionsgate to produce films.

In June 2024, Vertigo announced an alliance with AWA Studios to create New Horror Storytelling Pipeline.

== Filmography ==
=== Theatrical films ===
==== 2000s ====
Year	Title	Director	Distributor	Notes	Budget	Gross
2002	The Ring	Gore Verbinski	DreamWorks Pictures	uncredited; co-production with BenderSpink and MacDonald/Parkes Productions	$48 million	$249.3 million
2004	The Grudge	Takashi Shimizu	Sony Pictures Releasing	uncredited; co-production with Columbia Pictures and Ghost House Pictures	$10 million	$187.2 million
2005	The Ring Two	Hideo Nakata	DreamWorks Pictures	uncredited; co-production with BenderSpink and Parkes/MacDonald Productions	$50 million	$164 million
2005	Dark Water	Walter Salles	Buena Vista Pictures	first credited film; co-production with Touchstone Pictures and Pandemonium	$30 million	$49.4 million
2006	Eight Below	Frank Marshall	Buena Vista Pictures	uncredited; co-production with Spyglass Entertainment, Mandeville Films and The Kennedy/Marshall Company	$40 million	$120.5 million
2006	The Lake House	Alejandro Agresti	Warner Bros. Pictures	co-production with Village Roadshow Pictures	$40 million	$115 million
2006	The Departed	Martin Scorsese	Warner Bros. Pictures	co-production with Plan B Entertainment, Initial Entertainment Group and Media Asia Films	$90 million	$291.5 million
2006	The Grudge 2	Takashi Shimizu	Sony Pictures Releasing	uncredited; co-production with Columbia Pictures and Ghost House Pictures	$20 million	$70.7 million
2007	The Invasion	Oliver Hirschbiegel	Warner Bros. Pictures	co-production with Village Roadshow Pictures and Silver Pictures	$65–80 million	$40.2 million
2008	The Eye	David Moreau; Xavier Palud	Lionsgate	co-production with Paramount Vantage and Cruise/Wagner Productions	$12 million	$56.96 million
2008	Shutter	Masayuki Ochiai	20th Century Fox	co-production with Regency Enterprises	$8 million	$48 million
2008	The Strangers	Bryan Bertino	Rogue Pictures	co-production with Intrepid Pictures and Mandate Pictures	$9 million	$82.4 million
2008	My Sassy Girl	Yann Samuell	20th Century Fox Home Entertainment	co-production with CJ Entertainment; direct-to-video	N/A	N/A
2008	Quarantine	John Erick Dowdle	Sony Pictures Releasing	co-production with Screen Gems, Andale Pictures and Filmax	$12 million	$41.3 million
2009	The Uninvited	The Guard Brothers	Paramount Pictures	co-production with Cold Spring Pictures, The Montecito Picture Company, Parkes/MacDonald Productions, Goldcrest Pictures and DreamWorks Pictures	N/A	$41.6 million
2009	Assassination of a High School President	Brett Simon	Sony Pictures Home Entertainment	co-production with Yari Film Group	$11 million	$6 million
2009	The Grudge 3	Toby Wilkins	Sony Pictures Home Entertainment	uncredited; co-production with Stage 6 Films and Ghost House Pictures	N/A	N/A
2009	The Echo	Yam Laranas	Image Entertainment	co-production with QED International and RightOff Entertainment	$5 million	$1.5 million

==== 2010s ====
Year	Title	Director	Distributor	Notes	Budget	Gross
2010	Possession	Joel Bergvall; Simon Sandquist	20th Century Fox Home Entertainment	co-production with Yari Film Group and Spitfire Pictures	N/A	$682,713
2011	The Roommate	Christian E. Christiansen	Sony Pictures Releasing	co-production with Screen Gems	$16 million	$52.5 million
2011	Quarantine 2: Terminal	John Pogue	Sony Pictures Home Entertainment	co-production with Third Street Pictures, RCR Media Group, Stage 6 Films and Andale Pictures	N/A	N/A
2011	Abduction	John Singleton	Lionsgate	co-production with Quick Six Entertainment and Tailor Made Productions	$35 million	$90.1 million
2011	Asylum Blackout	Alexandre Courtes	IFC Films	co-production with Artemis Productions, Marquis Productions and Wy Productions	N/A	$98,201
2012	The Woman in Black	James Watkins	CBS Films	uncredited; co-production with Alliance Films, Hammer Films, UK Film Council, Cross Creek Pictures, Tailsman Films, Exclusive Media Group and Film i Vast	$15 million	$129 million
2013	Oldboy	Spike Lee	FilmDistrict	co-production with Good Universe and 40 Acres and a Mule Filmworks	$30 million	$4.8 million
2014	The Lego Movie	Phil Lord & Christopher Miller	Warner Bros. Pictures	co-production with Warner Animation Group, Village Roadshow Pictures, RatPac-Dune Entertainment, Lego System A/S, Lin Pictures, and Animal Logic	$60–65 million	$468.1 million
2014	The Voices	Marjane Satrapi	Lionsgate	co-production with 1984 Private Defense Contractors, Babelsberg Studio and Mandalay Vision	$11 million	$444,196
2014	The Woman in Black: Angel of Death	Tom Harper	Relativity Media	uncredited; co-production with Entertainment One and Hammer Films	$15 million	$48.9 million
2015	Run All Night	Jaume Collet-Serra	Warner Bros. Pictures	co-production with RatPac-Dune Entertainment and Energy Entertainment	$50–61.6 million	$71.6 million
2015	Poltergeist	Gil Kenan	20th Century Fox	co-production with Fox 2000 Pictures, Metro-Goldwyn-Mayer and Ghost House Pictures	$35 million	$95.4 million
2015	Hidden	The Duffer Brothers	Warner Bros. Pictures	co-production with Primal Pictures	N/A	$310,273
2016	The Boy	William Brent Bell	STX Entertainment	co-production with Lakeshore Entertainment and Huayi Brothers Pictures	$10 million	$64.1 million
2016	Flight 7500	Takashi Shimizu	Lionsgate	co-production with CBS Films and Ozla Pictures	N/A	$2.8 million
2016	Blair Witch	Adam Wingard	Lionsgate	co-production with Snoot Entertainment and Room 101	$5 million	$45.2 million
2016	In the Shadow of Iris	Jalil Lespert	Netflix	uncredited; co-production with Wy Productions, Universal Pictures International, Nexus Factory, uFund, uMedia, France Televisions, Canal+, Cine+, Cofinova 12, Cofinova 13, Indefilms and Cofimage 27	N/A	$1.5 million
2017	Sleepless	Baran bo Odar	Open Road Films	co-production with Riverstone Pictures	$30 million	$32.9 million
2017	Rings	F. Javier Gutierrez	Paramount Pictures	uncredited; co-production with Parkes + MacDonald Image Nation	$25 million	$83.1 million
2017	The Lego Batman Movie	Chris McKay	Warner Bros. Pictures	co-production with Warner Animation Group, DC Entertainment, RatPac-Dune Entertainment, Lego System A/S, Lin Pictures, Lord Miller Productions, and Animal Logic	$80 million	$312 million
2017	Death Note	Adam Wingard	Netflix	co-production with LP Entertainment	$40–$50 million	N/A
2017	It	Andy Muschietti	Warner Bros. Pictures	co-production with Lin Pictures, KatzSmith Productions, New Line Cinema and RatPac Entertainment	$35–$40 million	$701.8 million
2017	The Lego Ninjago Movie	Charlie Bean; Paul Fisher; Bob Logan	Warner Bros. Pictures	co-production with Warner Animation Group, RatPac-Dune Entertainment, Lego System A/S, Lin Pictures, Lord Miller Productions, and Animal Logic	$70 million	$123.1 million
2017	The Disaster Artist	James Franco	A24	uncredited; co-production with Point Grey Pictures, Warner Bros. Pictures, New Line Cinema, Good Universe and Rabbit Bandini Productions	$10 million	$29.8 million
2018	Extinction	Ben Young	Netflix	uncredited; co-production with Good Universe and Mandeville Films	N/A	N/A
2019	Polaroid	Lars Klevberg	Vertical Entertainment	co-production with Dimension Films, Benderspink and Eldorado Film	N/A	$2.4 million
2019	The Lego Movie 2: The Second Part	Mike Mitchell	Warner Bros. Pictures	co-production with Warner Animation Group, Lego System A/S, Rideback, Lord Miller Productions, and Animal Logic	$99 million	$192.3 million
2019	It Chapter Two	Andy Muschietti	Warner Bros. Pictures	co-production with Double Dream, Rideback and New Line Cinema	$79 million	$473.1 million
2019	Doctor Sleep	Mike Flanagan	Warner Bros. Pictures	co-production with Intrepid Pictures	$45 million	$72.3 million

==== 2020s ====
Year	Title	Director	Distributor	Notes	Budget	Gross
2020	The Grudge	Nicolas Pesce	Sony Pictures Releasing	uncredited; co-production with Screen Gems, Stage 6 Films and Ghost House Pictures	$10–14 million	$49.5 million
2020	The Turning	Floria Sigismondi	Universal Pictures	co-production with DreamWorks Pictures, Reliance Entertainment and Chislehurst Entertainment	$14 million	$18.6 million
2020	Brahms: The Boy II	William Brent Bell	STXfilms	uncredited; co-production with Lakeshore Entertainment	$10 million	$20.3 million
2020	His House	Remi Weekes	Netflix	co-production with Regency Enterprises, BBC Films and Starchild Pictures	N/A	N/A
2022	Barbarian	Zach Cregger	20th Century Studios	co-production with Regency Enterprises, Almost Never Films and BoulderLight Pictures	$4–4.5 million	$45.4 million
2022	Don't Worry Darling	Olivia Wilde	Warner Bros. Pictures	co-production with New Line Cinema	$20–35 million	$87.6 million
2023	The Mother	Niki Caro	Netflix	co-production with Nuyorican Productions	N/A	N/A
2023	Nimona	Nick Bruno; Troy Quane	Netflix	uncredited; co-production with Annapurna Pictures	N/A	N/A
2023	Cobweb	Samuel Bodin	Lionsgate	co-production with Point Grey Pictures	N/A	$8.1 million
2023	Woman of the Hour	Anna Kendrick	Netflix	co-production with Let's Go Again, AGC Studios and BoulderLight Pictures	N/A	N/A
2023	Boy Kills World	Moritz Mohr	Lionsgate; Roadside Attractions	co-production with Raimi Productions, Nthibah Pictures and Hammerstone Studios	N/A	$3.1 million
2023	Five Nights at Freddy's	Emma Tammi	Universal Pictures	uncredited; co-production with Blumhouse Productions, KatzSmith Productions, and Scott Cawthon Productions	$25 million	$297.1 million
2023	Baghead	Alberto Corredor	StudioCanal	uncredited; co-production with Studio Babelsberg and The Picture Company	N/A	N/A
2024	Ordinary Angels	Jon Gunn	Lionsgate	co-production with Kingdom Story Company, Stampede Ventures, Stolen Sky Productions and Green Hummingbird Entertainment	$12–13 million	$20.5 million
2024	The Strangers: Chapter 1	Renny Harlin	Lionsgate	uncredited; co-production with Fifth Element Productions, Stream Media, Sherborne Media and LipSync	$8.5 million	$48 million
2024	'Salem's Lot	Gary Dauberman	Max	co-production with New Line Cinema, Atomic Monster and Wolper Organization	N/A	N/A
2025	Companion	Drew Hancock	Warner Bros. Pictures	co-production with New Line Cinema, BoulderLight Pictures and Subconscious	$10 million	$36.7 million
2025	A Minecraft Movie	Jared Hess	Warner Bros. Pictures	co-production with Legendary Pictures, Mojang Studios and On the Roam	$150 million	$958.2 million
2025	Until Dawn	David F. Sandberg	Sony Pictures Releasing	co-production with Screen Gems, PlayStation Productions, Coin Operated and Mangata	$15 million	$54 million
2025	Weapons	Zach Cregger	Warner Bros. Pictures	co-production with New Line Cinema, Subconscious and BoulderLight Pictures	$38 million	$269.1 million
2025	The Long Walk	Francis Lawrence	Lionsgate	co-production with about:blank	$20 million	$63.1 million
2026	Psycho Killer	Gavin Polone	20th Century Studios	co-production with Regency Enterprises, New Regency, and Constantin Film	$10 million	$2.56 million
2026	Resident Evil	Zach Cregger	Sony Pictures Releasing	co-production with Columbia Pictures, Constantin Film, Davis Films, PlayStation Productions, and Subconscious	$75 million	$400.2 million

==== Upcoming ====
Year	Title	Director	Distributor	Notes
2027	Possession	Parker Finn	Paramount Pictures	co-production with Icki Eneo Arlo and Bad Feeling
2027	A Minecraft Movie Squared	Jared Hess	Warner Bros. Pictures	co-production with Legendary Entertainment, Mojang Studios and On the Roam
2027	Untitled Blair Witch film	Dylan Clark	Lionsgate	co-production with Blumhouse Productions, Atomic Monster and Divide/Conquer
2028	The Flood	Zach Cregger	Warner Bros. Pictures	co-production with New Line Cinema and Amblin Entertainment
2028	Gladys	TBA	Warner Bros. Pictures	co-production with New Line Cinema, BoulderLight Pictures and Subconscious
TBA	BioShock	Francis Lawrence	Netflix	co-production with 2K
TBA	Every House Is Haunted	Adam Schindler; Brian Netto	20th Century Studios	co-production with Raimi Productions and Starlight Media
TBA	Outlast	TBA	Lionsgate	co-production with Red Barrels
TBA	Little One	Alex Kavutskiy	TBA	co-production with Soto Productions and Hammerstone Studios
TBA	Polaris	Lynne Ramsay	TBA	
TBA	The Sims	Kate Herron	Amazon MGM Studios	co-production with LuckyChap Entertainment and Electronic Arts
TBA	Reborn	Chris McKay	Netflix	co-production with Fortis Films
TBA	The Witch Boy	Minkyu Lee	Netflix	

=== Television series ===
==== 2000s ====
Year	Title	Creator	Network	Notes	Seasons	Episodes
2007	I'm from Rolling Stone	Shari Brooks	MTV	co-production with Maverick Films, Rolling Stone and Yolo Films	1	10

==== 2010s ====
Year	Title	Creator	Network	Notes	Seasons	Episodes
2013–2014	Bates Motel	based on characters from Psycho by: Robert Bloch developed by: Carlton Cuse; Kerry Ehrin; Anthony Cipriano	A&E	uncredited; seasons 1–2; co-production with American Genre (season 1), Kerry Ehrin Productions, Carlton Cuse Productions (season 2) and Universal Television	2	20
2016	The Exorcist	Jeremy Slater based on The Exorcist by: William Peter Blatty	Fox	uncredited; season 1; co-production with New Neighborhood, Morgan Creek Productions and 20th Century Fox Television	1	10
2017–2020	Unikitty!	based on The Lego Movie by: Phil Lord and Christopher Miller developed by: Ed Skudder; Lynn Wang	Cartoon Network	uncredited; co-production with The Lego Group and Warner Bros. Animation	3	104

==== 2020s ====
Year	Title	Creator	Network	Notes	Seasons	Episodes
2020–2021	The Stand	based on The Stand by: Stephen King developed by: Josh Boone; Ben Cavell	CBS All Access	co-production with Mosaic Media Group and CBS Studios	1	9
2021–2024	Them	Little Marvin	Amazon Prime Video	co-production with Sony Pictures Television, Amazon Studios, Hillman Grad Productions and Odd Man Out	2	18
2024–present	Hop	Marc Brown; Peter K. Hirsch; Tolon Brown developed by: Ridley Scott	Max; CBC Kids (Canada)	co-production with Epic Story Media, Loomi Animation, Marc Brown Studios, and Scott Free Productions	1	26
2025	It: Welcome to Derry	based on It by: Stephen King developed by: Andy Muschietti; Barbara Muschietti; Jason Fuchs	HBO	co-production with Rideback, FiveTen Productions, K Plus Ultra, Double Dream and Warner Bros. Television	1	8
