= The Christmas Classic =

- Directed by: Shane Dax Taylor
- Written by: Shane Dax Taylor; Austin Nichols
- Produced by: Daniel Cummings
- Starring: Malin Akerman; Amy Smart; Ryan Hansen; Chris Mullinax; Mary Maxson; Pamela K. Witte; Will Blagrove; Wes Hager; Lola Taylor; Samantha Taylor; Charlotte Taylor; Robyn Taylor; Carlos Alazraqui narrator =
- Distributed by: Quiver Distribution
- Release date: November 3, 2023
- Running time: 80 minutes
- Country: United States
- Language: English

The Christmas Classic is a 2023 American Christmas film starring Malin Akerman and Amy Smart and produced by Daniel Cummings and Quiver Distribution.

== Plot ==
After a decade of living in San Francisco, Elizabeth Bird returns to her hometown of Ruidoso during Christmastime to convince her ex-boyfriend Randy to sell his ski resort to her employer and future father-in-law.

== Release ==
The film played in select theaters in 2023 and was released on video on demand.

== Critical reception ==
Common Sense Media, "This holiday romcom fails to create a coherent storyline and ends up an incoherent, nonsensical mess. That said, The Christmas Classic does hit all the beats you might expect from a Hallmark or Lifetime Christmas film."

Screen Rant, "Romance and comedy mingle in the perfect holiday cocktail thanks to The Christmas Classic."

MovieWeb, "Thanks to some compelling chemistry between Malin Akerman (Watchmen, The Final Girls) and Ryan Hansen (Party Down, Superhero Movie), as well as a sweetly entertaining story, there is plenty of charm and festive spirit to be found in this early-in-the-season holiday flick."
