= Lulu Wilson =

American actress (born 2005)

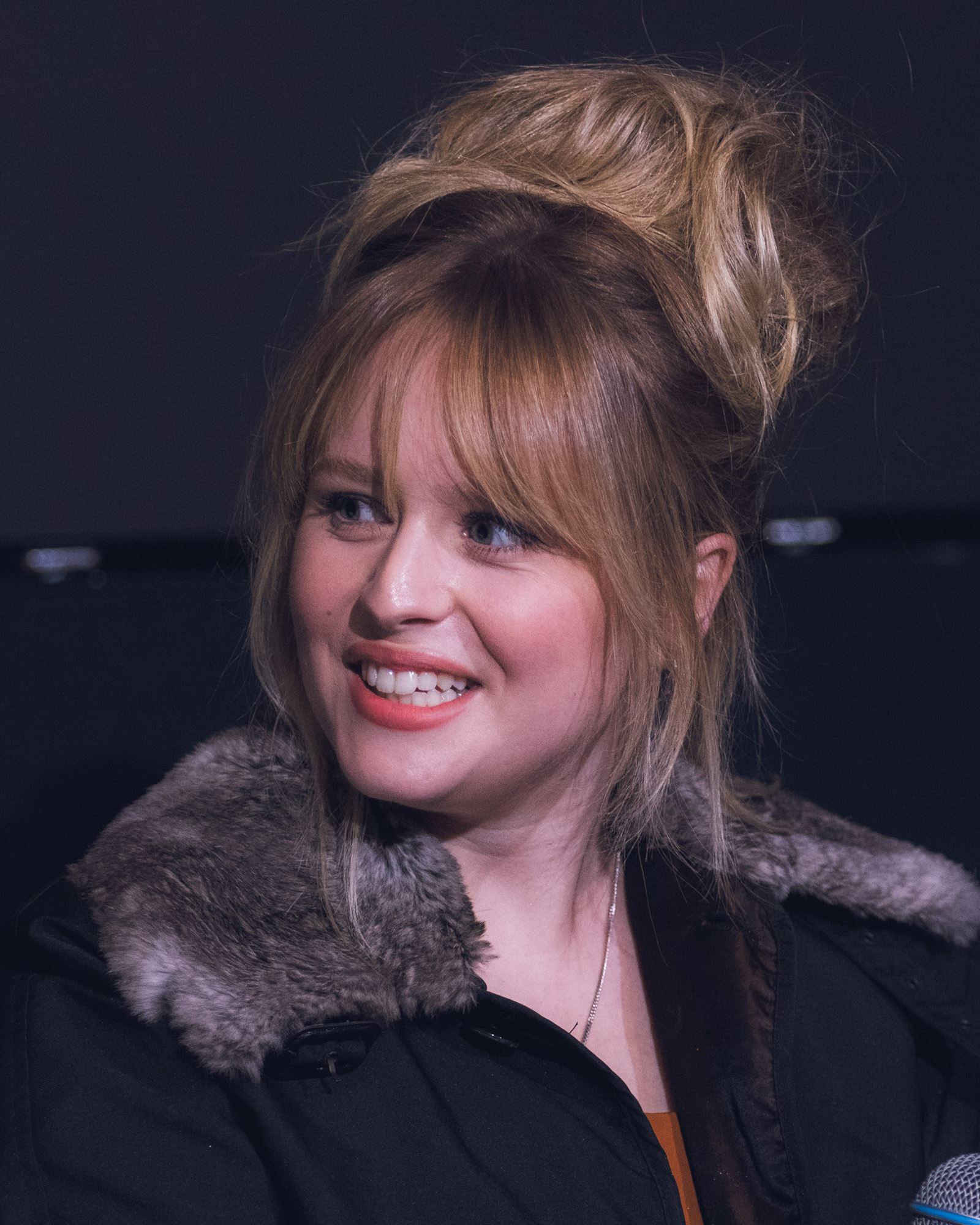
- Wilson in 2025
- Born: October 7, 2005 (age 21)
- Occupation: Actress
- Years active: 2008–present

Lulu Wilson (born October 7, 2005) is an American actress known mostly for the horror films Ouija: Origin of Evil (2016) and Annabelle: Creation (2017), as well as the television series adaptation of The Haunting of Hill House (2018) and The Fall of the House of Usher (2023). She was cast as the teenage Gloria Steinem in the biopic film The Glorias (2020).

== Early life ==
Wilson was born on October 7, 2005. Her parents are Barbara and Greg Wilson. She has two older sisters.

== Career ==
Wilson started acting in commercials at the age of three in 2008. In 2012, she made her television acting debut in an episode of Louie and went on to appear in several television series such as The Millers, Black Box and Sharp Objects.

She made her film debut in the 2014 horror film Deliver Us from Evil and went on to appear in the horror films Ouija: Origin of Evil (2016) and Annabelle: Creation (2017). She was also cast in the 2016 Marvel Studios film Doctor Strange, but her scene was cut for pacing purposes. In 2018, she appeared in the Netflix horror drama series The Haunting of Hill House and had a part in Steven Spielberg's science-fiction film Ready Player One.

In 2020, she played her first leading role as the title character in the action thriller Becky. That same year, she played the teenage Gloria Steinem in the biopic The Glorias. She also appeared in a first-season episode of Star Trek: Picard as the daughter of William T. Riker and Deanna Troi.

In 2023, she reprised her role as Becky in the sequel The Wrath of Becky. The same year, she appeared in the horror miniseries The Fall of the House of Usher. In 2026, she appeared in the stoner comedy Pizza Movie.

She reprised her role as Becky for a second time in The Last Temptation of Becky, which wrapped filming in February 2026 in Northern Ireland. The film was released in the United States on November 4, 2026.

== Filmography ==
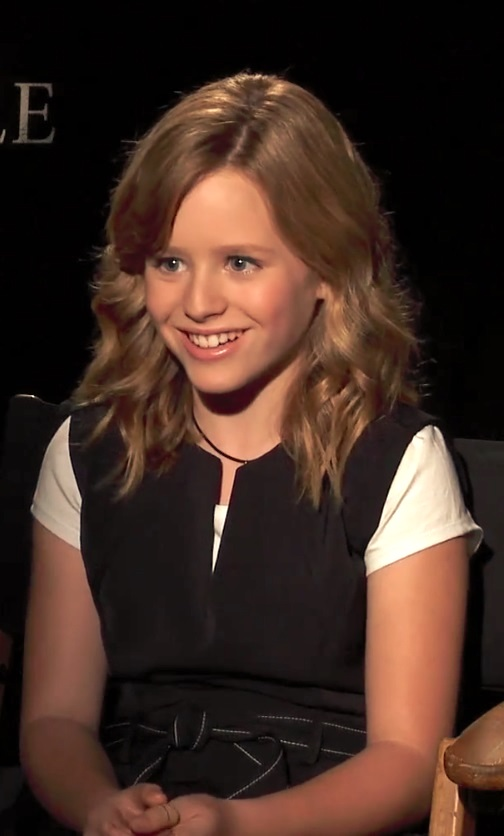
Wilson in 2017

=== Film ===
Year	Title	Role	Notes
2014	Deliver Us from Evil	Christina Sarchie	
2015	Her Composition	Victoria	
2016	Ouija: Origin of Evil	Doris Zander	
2016	Doctor Strange	Donna Strange	Deleted scene
2017	Annabelle: Creation	Linda	
2017	Cop and a Half: New Recruit	Karina Foley	Direct-to-video
2018	Ready Player One	Elementary School Kid	
2018	Gone Are the Days	Sally Anne	
2018	Slumber	Maya	
2019	Wyrm	Izzy	
2020	The Glorias	Teen Gloria Steinem	
2020	Becky	Becky Hooper	
2023	The Wrath of Becky	Becky Hooper	
2025	Xeno	Renee Rowan	
2026	Pizza Movie	Lizzy (Note: While the credits list her as "Lizzy", within the movie, her name is written as "Lizzie".)	
2026	The Last Temptation of Becky	Becky Hooper	
2027	Buzzkill †	Lydia	Post-production
TBA	The Decline of Fucking Western Civilization †		Filming

=== Television ===
Year	Title	Role	Notes
2012	Louie	Little Girl	Episode: "Barney/Never"
2014	The Money	Grandchild	TV movie
2014	Black Box	Young Catherine Black	3 episodes
2014–2015	The Millers	Mikayla Stoker	23 episodes
2015–2016	Inside Amy Schumer	Various	3 episodes
2016	Teachers	Annie	Episode: "Hall of Shame"
2017	Raised by Wolves	Yoko Gable	TV movie
2018	Sharp Objects	Marian Crellin	7 episodes
2018	The Haunting of Hill House	Young Shirley	7 episodes
2020	Star Trek: Picard	Kestra Troi-Riker	Episode: "Nepenthe"
2020	50 States of Fright	Mallory	Episode: "13 Steps to Hell"
2021	Modern Love	Katie	Episode: "Am I...? Maybe This Quiz Game Will Tell Me"
2023	The Fall of the House of Usher	Young Madeline	Episode: "A Midnight Dreary"
