= Jordan Yale Levine =

American film producer

Jordan Yale Levine (born January 7, 1985) is an American film producer and founding partner of Yale Productions. He has worked as a producer on a number of films, including King Cobra by director Justin Kelly, and After Everything by directors Hannah Marks and Joey Power.

== Early life ==
Levine was born in Long Island. He attended G.W. Hewlett High School in Hewlett, New York before graduating in 2003.

== Career ==
He produced his first movie at 19 years old before founding his own company, Yale Productions, in 2012. Between producing, financing, and distribution, Levine has been involved in the production of over 30 films and was named as one of Variety's 10 Producers to Watch in 2016.

Levine recently secured an investment for Yale Productions in 2019 from The Forest Road Company.

While production companies have taken a hit during the COVID-19 pandemic, Yale Productions was able to push forward with its release of Becky. The film made $205,797 from 45 theaters in its opening weekend, finishing second among reported films. It made $192,138 from 50 theaters in its second weekend, becoming the first film to officially top The Wretched at the box office.

=== Festivals ===
Levine has produced many films that have premiered at various festivals. He made his debut at Tribeca Film Festival in 2016 with King Cobra and was set to return to Tribeca Film Festival in 2020 for the premiere of Becky but the festival was canceled due to the COVID-19 Pandemic. Another recently produced film, I Used to Go Here was to premiere at the SXSW in 2020 but that was also shut down due to the COVID-19 Pandemic.

Owing to his experience at film festivals, Levine was interviewed by the Hollywood Reporter about the American Film Market in 2017.

== Filmography ==
He was producer for all films unless otherwise noted.

=== Film ===
Year	Film	Credit
2006	Paid	Executive producer
2007	Life Goes On	Executive producer
2007	The Final Curtain	Executive producer
2007	Tooth and Nail	Executive producer
2008	Death's Door	Executive producer
2009	Blood Ties	Executive producer
2010	The Penitent Man	Co-executive producer
2010	The Land of the Astronauts	
2010	Wreckage	Executive producer
2011	Mangus!	Co-executive producer
2012	Petunia	Line producer
2012	Cut/Print	Executive producer
2012	After the Dawn	Executive producer
2013	He's Way More Famous Than You	Co-executive producer
2015	Addiction: A 60's Love Story	
2015	Isolation	Executive producer
2015	My First Miracle	
2016	Jack Goes Home	
2016	Element	Executive producer
2016	King Cobra	
2016	Love on the Run	
2016	Loserville	Executive producer
2016	Welcome to Willits	
2017	Altitude	Executive producer
2017	Class Rank	Executive producer
2017	Ten	
2018	After Everything	
2018	Welcome the Stranger	
2018	The Escape of Prisoner 614	
2018	Pretenders	
2019	Crypto	
2019	Already Gone	
2019	Burn	
2020	Hooking Up	
2020	Becky	
2020	I Used to Go Here	
2020	Chick Fight	
2021	Stowaway	Executive producer
2021	Separation	
2021	Rogue Hostage	
2021	The Survivalist	
2021	Castle Falls	Executive producer
2022	Gasoline Alley	Executive producer
2022	Panama	
2022	As They Made Us	
2022	White Elephant	Executive producer
2022	Alone Together	
2022	Bandit	
2023	The Wrath of Becky	
2023	Rare Objects	
2024	Cult Killer	
2024	Electra	
2024	The Clean Up Crew	
2026	The Last Temptation of Becky	
TBA	Bailey & Darla	
TBA	Ballad of a Hustler	Executive producer
TBA	Banshee	
TBA	Confession	
TBA	Deadlock	Executive producer
TBA	High Heat	
TBA	Michigan	
TBA	Midnight	
TBA	Paradise City	Executive producer
TBA	Tangled Up in Blue	
TBA	The Kill Room	

As an actor

Year	Film	Role
2010	2001 Maniacs: Field of Screams	K-Jay
2010	The Land of the Astronauts	Colin
2010	Wreckage	Jimmy

Miscellaneous crew

Year	Film	Role
2013	Apparitional	Producer's representative
2014	Such Good People	Producers representative
