= Becky (2020 film) =

Film by Jonathan Milott and Cary Murnion

- Theatrical release poster
- Directed by: Jonathan Milott; Cary Murnion
- Written by: Nick Morris; Lane Skye; Ruckus Skye
- Produced by: Raphael Margules; J. D. Lifshitz; Jordan Yale Levine; Jordan Beckerman; Russ Posternak
- Starring: Lulu Wilson; Kevin James; Joel McHale
- Cinematography: Greta Zozula
- Edited by: Alan Canant
- Music by: Nima Fakhrara
- Production companies: Yale Productions; BoulderLight Pictures
- Distributed by: Quiver Distribution; Redbox Entertainment
- Release date: June 5, 2020
- Running time: 93 minutes
- Country: United States
- Language: English
- Box office: $1.1 million

Becky is a 2020 American action thriller film directed by Jonathan Milott and Cary Murnion, from a screenplay by Nick Morris, Lane Skye, and Ruckus Skye. The film stars Lulu Wilson, Kevin James, and Joel McHale. McHale and Wilson portray Jeff and Becky, a father and daughter whose vacation home is besieged by a gang of Neo-Nazis led by James's character, Dominick.

Becky was scheduled to have its world premiere at the Tribeca Film Festival in April 2020, but the festival was postponed due to the COVID-19 pandemic. It was released on video-on-demand, digital platforms and in select drive-in theaters on June 5, 2020, by Quiver Distribution and Redbox Entertainment. The film received mixed reviews from critics, though many praised Wilson's performance. The movie successfully launched a titular film series with Lulu Wilson returning in the lead role, beginning with The Wrath of Becky (2023) which had its world premiere at South by Southwest (SXSW).

== Plot ==
Thirteen-year-old Becky Hooper is questioned about a recent incident at her family's lakehouse two weeks earlier. She gives vague answers and claims to remember only minor details. The story unfolds through her flashbacks.

Becky's mother died from cancer a year earlier, and she has a strained relationship with her father, Jeff. In an attempt to reconnect with her, they go on a trip to the family's old lakefront home. Meanwhile, prisoners Dominick Lewis, a Neo-Nazi, and his men Wallace "Apex" Landham, Sonny Cole, and Roman Hammond are transferred in a prison van. The group kills an inmate to get the van to pull over, kills the guards and escapes. They stop a car and steal it, killing the occupants in the process, a father and his two young children.

Jeff's girlfriend, Kayla, and her young son, Ty, arrive at the house, upsetting Becky. Jeff announces his engagement to Kayla. Becky storms out of the house, upset, followed by her Cane Corso dog, Diego. At her small fort in the woods, she knocks over a box of possessions, including a key whose bow is formed in the shape of a valknut. Dominick and his men show up at the family house, take everyone hostage, and demand the key. Kayla and Ty try to escape but are intercepted by Apex, who has grown tired of killing, and urges them to escape. Cole kills Dora, the family's other dog. Jeff lies about Becky's presence to protect her, but Dominick shoots Kayla to get the truth out of them.

Becky becomes aware of the assailants' presence and talks over a walkie-talkie, pretending to call the police in an attempt to scare them away. Dominick calls her bluff and tortures Jeff to lure her out. Dominick allows Jeff to talk to Becky, but Jeff tells her to run. Jeff breaks free and finds Becky, telling her he loves her, before Dominick shoots him dead. Dominick demands the key, but Becky gouges out his left eye with it then flees with Diego.

Dominick goes back into the house and sends Cole and Hammond to retrieve the key. Cole chases Becky back to her fort and tries to negotiate, but she ambushes and kills him with colored pencils and a sharpened ruler.

Apex shows Kayla and Ty compassion, and Dominick tries to have Apex reaffirm his loyalty to him. After finding Cole's corpse, Hammond chases Becky down to the lake, where she lures him into a trap, impaling his stomach. Hammond then falls into the lake, and Becky kills him with the propeller of an outboard motor. Apex finds Becky and her dog, incapacitates the latter, but does not want to hurt Becky, and urges her to flee.

Becky makes her presence known to Kayla and Ty; Kayla tries to distract Dominick by asking him about the key's purpose. Becky sets off the car alarm to lure Dominick out, while Kayla frees herself. Apex fends off Dominick long enough for Becky to run a lawnmover over Dominick's head, and then shoots the apologetic Apex dead. Kayla and Ty join Diego and Becky to wait for the police.

In the present, Becky claims she does not remember the gang's deaths and lies about why they said they had come, with a cold look on her face, one hand nonchalantly playing with the key dangling on a string around her neck.

== Cast ==
- Lulu Wilson as Becky
- Kevin James as Dominick
- Joel McHale as Jeff
- Robert Maillet as Apex
- Amanda Brugel as Kayla
- Isaiah Rockcliffe as Ty
- Ryan McDonald as Cole
- James McDougall as Hammond

== Production ==
In May 2019, it was announced Simon Pegg and Lulu Wilson had joined the cast of the film, with Jonathan Milott and Cary Murnion directing from a screenplay by Nick Morris, Lane Skye and Ruckus Skye. In July 2019, it was announced Kevin James had joined the cast of the film, replacing Pegg who dropped out due to a scheduling conflict. In August 2019, Joel McHale, Amanda Brugel and Robert Maillet joined the cast of the film.

== Release ==
The film was scheduled to have its world premiere at the Tribeca Film Festival on April 20, 2020. However, the festival was postponed due to the COVID-19 pandemic. That same month, Quiver Distribution and Redbox Entertainment acquired distribution rights to the film and set it for a June 5, 2020, release.

Through its first 10 days of release, the film ranked as high as 8th on Spectrum's rental charts and 12th at the iTunes Store.

== Reception ==
=== Box office ===
Becky made $205,797 from 45 theaters in its opening weekend, finishing second among reported films. It made $192,138 from 50 theaters in its second weekend, becoming the first film to officially top The Wretched at the box office. It made $85,056 the following week but was itself dethroned by newcomer Followed, before returning to first in its fourth weekend.

=== Critical response ===
On review aggregator Rotten Tomatoes, the film has an approval rating of 72% based on 121 reviews, with an average rating of 5.9/10. The website's critics consensus reads: "Becky isn't quite able to sustain enough intensity to fully take advantage of its premise, though it serves up entertainingly nasty thrills for genre fans." On Metacritic, the film has a weighted average score of 54 out of 100, based on 22 critics, indicating "mixed or average" reviews.

Dennis Harvey of Variety called the film an "over-the-top yet effectively taut thriller" and "Wilson's nimble half-brat, half-she-devil performance is key to our buying the basic premise, aided by solid supporting cast contributions. James grows less intimidating the more dialogue he's given in an otherwise trim script by marital duo Ruckus and Lane Skye." Jordan Mintzer of The Hollywood Reporter wrote: "Becky tends to work best when it revels in the blood-splattered set pieces of its script (written by Ruckus Skye, Lane Skye and Nick Morris), going that extra mile and a half in the gore department (special effects makeup was by Karlee Morse) to create some truly disgusting moments, albeit ones that are laced with a grim sense of humor."

== Sequel ==
A sequel, The Wrath of Becky, had its world premiere at South by Southwest (SXSW) on March 10, 2023, with Wilson returning in the eponymous role.
