= Kate Siegel =

American actress, writer and director

- Siegel in 2026
- Born: Silver Spring, Maryland, U.S.
- Education: Syracuse University (BFA)
- Occupations: Actress; writer; director
- Years active: 2006–present
- Spouse: Mike Flanagan (m. 2016)
- Children: 2

Kate Siegel (/ˈsiːɡəl/ SEE-gəl), is an American actress, writer and director. Dubbed a scream queen for her extensive work in the horror genre, Siegel is known for her collaborations with her husband, Mike Flanagan. She has starred in the films Oculus (2013); Hush, which she co-wrote, and Ouija: Origin of Evil (both 2016); Gerald's Game (2017); and The Life of Chuck (2024). On television, she has starred in the series The Haunting of Hill House (2018), The Haunting of Bly Manor (2020), Midnight Mass (2021), and The Fall of the House of Usher (2023).

== Early life ==
Siegel was born in Silver Spring, Maryland. She graduated from Syracuse University in 2004.

== Career ==
Siegel made her acting debut in the film The Curse of The Black Dahlia, which was released on January 23, 2007. That year she went on to star in Hacia La Oscuridad, which had its world premiere at the Tribeca Film Festival on April 28, 2007. She also appeared in Steam alongside Ruby Dee and Chelsea Handler. In 2008, Siegel appeared in the short film Knocked Down, which was directed by Ted Collins. In 2009, she made her television debut in Ghost Whisperer as Cheryl. In 2010, she appeared in Numb3rs as Rachel Hollander. She then appeared in an episode of Castle. That same year she appeared in the drama-thriller Wedding Day.

In 2013, Siegel appeared in Man Camp. The same year, she appeared in Oculus, a horror film written and directed by Flanagan. The film had its world premiere at the Toronto International Film Festival in September 2013, and was released in April 2014. She also appeared in an episode of Mob City. In 2014, she appeared in Demon Legacy.

In November 2015, it was revealed that she and Flanagan would be adapting the young adult novel 13 Days to Midnight into a film.

In 2016, Siegel starred as a deaf-mute woman beset by a killer in the horror-thriller Hush, a film on which she also made her screenwriting debut, co-writing with Flanagan. The film had its world premiere at South by Southwest on March 12, 2016, and was released on Netflix on April 8, 2016. In July 2016, she starred in a commercial for Stelara psoriasis medication. That same year, Siegel appeared in Ouija: Origin of Evil, also directed by Flanagan, which was released on October 21, 2016.

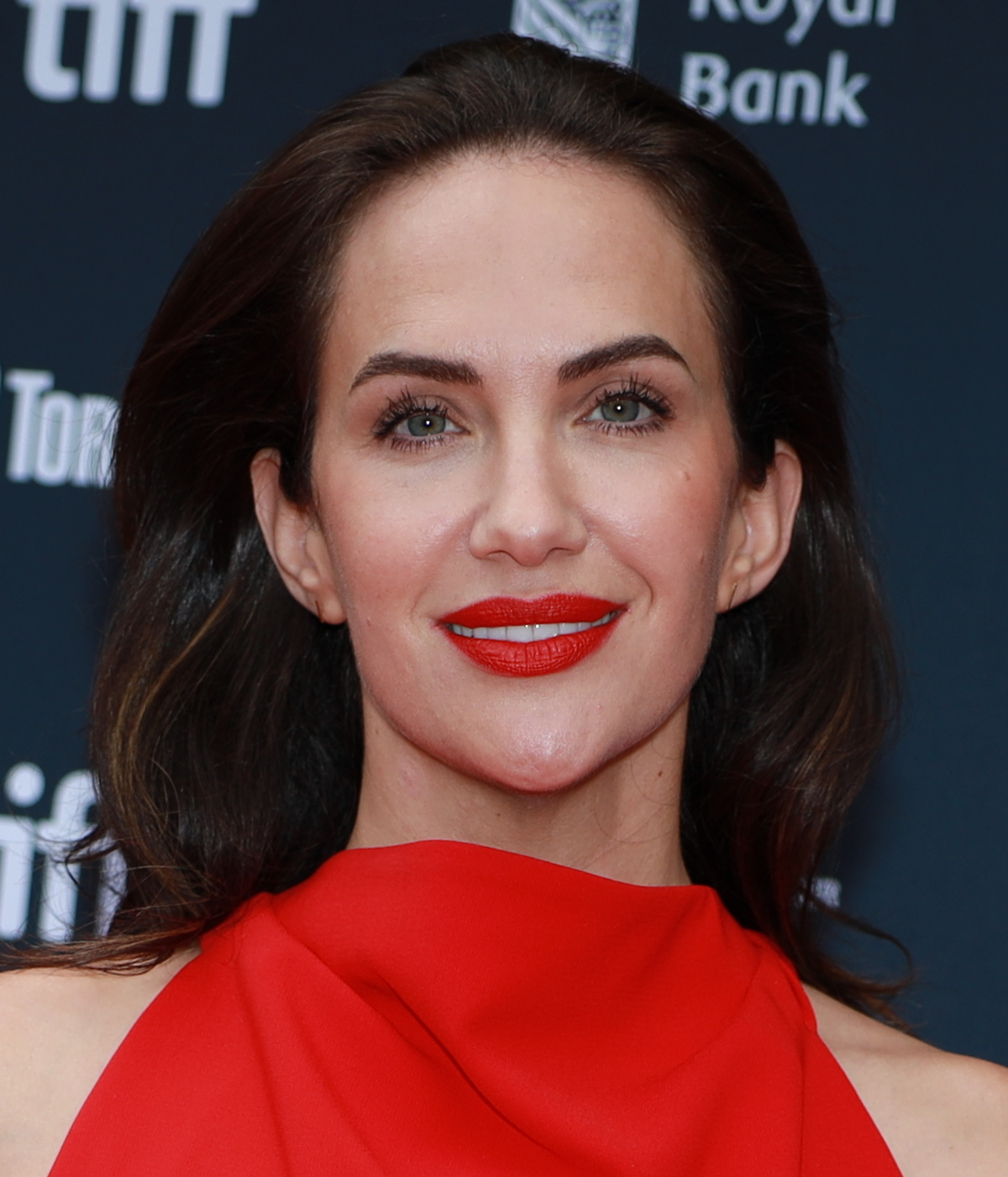
Siegel in 2024

In 2017, Siegel starred alongside Carla Gugino and Bruce Greenwood in the film adaptation of Stephen King's Gerald's Game, which was also directed by Flanagan. The film was released on September 29, 2017, by Netflix.

In 2018, Siegel had a starring role as Theodora Crain in the Netflix supernatural horror series The Haunting of Hill House, based on Shirley Jackson's 1959 novel of the same name. She also narrated the podcast Calling Darkness and has been a voice actor for The NoSleep Podcast.

Siegel portrayed Erin Greene in Netflix's Midnight Mass, which was written and directed by Flanagan, and co-starred her castmate from The Haunting of Hill House Henry Thomas.

In July 2024, she was confirmed to make her directorial debut, as she would direct a segment for V/H/S/Beyond, which was released exclusively on Shudder on October 4, 2024.

== Personal life ==
Siegel is of Russian-Jewish, Polish-Jewish, and German-Jewish descent. Siegel said in 2008 she is bisexual and had been in relationships with women before. She married director Mike Flanagan in early 2016. They have two children: a son and a daughter named after Siegel's character in The Haunting of Hill House. She is stepmother to Flanagan's elder son from a previous relationship.

== Filmography ==
=== Film ===
Year	Title	Role	Notes	Ref.
2007	The Curse of the Black Dahlia	Jennifer	Direct-to-video film	
2007	Total Darkness	Jenn		
2007	Steam	Elizabeth		
2012	Wedding Day	Erica		
2013	Man Camp	Teresa		
2013	Oculus	Marisol Chavez		
2014	Demon Legacy	Jack		
2016	Hot	Beth		
2016	Hush	Madison "Maddie" Young	Also writer	
2016	Ouija: Origin of Evil	Jenny Browning		
2017	Gerald's Game	Sally Burlingame		
2021	Hypnotic	Jenn Tompson		
2023	The Wrath of Becky	Agent Kate Montana	Cameo appearance	
2024	The Life of Chuck	Miss Richards		
2024	V/H/S/Beyond	None	Director of segment: "Stowaway"	
2025	The Room Returns!	Claudette		
2026	The Last Temptation of Becky	Agent Kate Montana		
2027	The Exorcist: Martyrs		Post-production	

=== Television ===
Year	Title	Role	Notes	Ref.
2009	Ghost Whisperer	Cheryl	Episode: "This Joint's Haunted"	
2010	Numbers	Rachel Hollander	Episode: "And the Winner Is..."	
2012	The Unknown	Evey Kyler	Episode: "Prime Cut"	
2012	Castle	Nadia	Episode: "47 Seconds"	
2012	Where Would We Be	Stephanie	Episode: "Pilot"	
2013	Mob City	Tandy	Episode: "Stay Down"	
2018	The Haunting of Hill House	Adult Theodora "Theo" Crain	Miniseries; 8 episodes	
2020	Hawaii Five-0	Leslie	Episode: "I ho'olulu, ho'ohulei 'ia e ka makani"	
2020	The Haunting of Bly Manor	Viola Willoughby / The Lady of the Lake	Episodes: "The Romance of Certain Old Clothes" and "The Beast in the Jungle"	
2021	Midnight Mass	Erin Greene	Miniseries; 7 episodes	
2022	The Time Traveler's Wife	Annette DeTamble	Recurring role; 3 episodes	
2023	The Fall of the House of Usher	Camille L'Espanaye	Miniseries; 7 episodes	
2026	The Creep Tapes	Crystal	Episode: "Crystal"	
2026–present	Carrie	Adelaide	Recurring role; 8 episodes (7 episodes voice only); Directed episode: "Social Studies"	

=== Video games ===
Year	Title	Role	Notes	Ref.
2025	Death Stranding 2: On the Beach	Olivia Westbury		

=== Podcasts ===
Siegel has appeared on the horror podcasts Calling Darkness, the film analysis podcast Flanagan's Wake, and The NoSleep Podcast.
