= Keith Thomas (director) =

American director, screenwriter, producer, and author

- Occupations: Film director, screenwriter, producer, author
- Years active: 2017–present
- Notable work: The Vigil; Firestarter
- Website: www.nightplatforminc.com

Keith Thomas is an American filmmaker and author. He is known for directing horror films such as The Vigil (2019) and Firestarter (2022).

== Personal life ==
Thomas is Jewish, a background he drew from for his film The Vigil (2019). He has a Master's degree in Religious Education from the Hebrew Union College in New York. He was a lead clinical researcher at the University of Colorado School of Medicine and National Jewish Health in Denver, Colorado.

== Career ==
In 2017, Thomas began his career by directing, writing, and producing the horror short film Arkane. That same year, he founded the production company Night Platform. He is also an author and wrote the novels The Clarity (2018), Dahlia Black (2019), and The Dunnie (2022).

In 2019, he made his feature directorial debut with the horror film The Vigil. It stars Dave Davis and was executive produced by Jason Blum through his Blumhouse Productions banner, alongside BoulderLight Pictures. The film premiered at the 2019 Toronto International Film Festival on September 9, 2019, and was released in the United States on February 26, 2021, by IFC Midnight.

In 2022, he directed, wrote, and produced the music video I Disappear (When You're Near), for A Place to Bury Strangers' album See Through You. That same year, he directed the science fiction horror film Firestarter, which is based on Stephen King's novel of the same name, and a remake of the 1984 film of the same name. It stars Zac Efron, Ryan Kiera Armstrong and Sydney Lemmon. It was produced by Jason Blum and Akiva Goldsman through their Blumhouse Productions and Weed Road Pictures banners, respectively. It was released in the United States on May 13, 2022, by Universal Pictures. After the release, he stated that there are ongoing discussions to possibly expand Firestarter into a franchise. Later that year, he directed an episode for the horror anthology television series Guillermo del Toro's Cabinet of Curiosities, which was executive produced by Guillermo del Toro. It premiered on October 25, 2022, on Netflix.

In 2024, he co-wrote the horror film The First Omen, which serves as a prequel to The Omen (1976), and the sixth overall film in The Omen franchise. It was directed by Arkasha Stevenson and produced by David S. Goyer through his Phantom Four Films banner. It stars Nell Tiger Free, Tawfeek Barhom, Sônia Braga, Ralph Ineson, and Bill Nighy. The film was released in the United States on April 5, 2024, by 20th Century Studios.

== Filmography ==
Short film

Year	Title	Director	Writer	Producer
2017	Arkane	Yes	Yes	Yes

Feature film

Year	Title	Director	Writer
2019	The Vigil	Yes	Yes
2022	Firestarter	Yes	No
2024	The First Omen	No	Yes

Television

Year	Title	Note
2022	Guillermo del Toro's Cabinet of Curiosities	Episode "Pickman's Model"

Music video

Year	Title	Artist	Ref(s)
2022	I Disappear (When You're Near)	A Place to Bury Strangers	

== Bibliography ==
- The Clarity (2018)
- Dahlia Black (2019)
- The Dunnie (2022)

== Accolades ==
For his work on The First Omen, he was nominated for "Best Screenplay" at the 2024 Fangoria Chainsaw Awards.
