= Quiver Distribution =

American-Canadian film company

- Type: Private
- Industry: Film industry
- Predecessors: Sterling Entertainment Group (1984–2006); Fireworks Entertainment (1991–2011); Kew Media Group (2002–2020); Allumination Filmworks (2006–2010)
- Founded: May 2019; 7 years ago
- Founder: Berry Meyerowitz; Jeff Sackman
- Headquarters: Los Angeles, California, U.S.
- Area served: United States; Canada
- Website: quiverdistribution.com

Quiver Capital USA, Inc. (doing business as Quiver Distribution) is an American-Canadian film production and film distribution company founded in 2019 by Berry Meyerowitz and Jeff Sackman. The company, sometimes referred to as an indie film company, is best known for releasing films The Fanatic, Running with the Devil, and Becky. In addition to its headquarters in Los Angeles, the company has a facility in Toronto. The firm's customers have included Netflix, Amazon, Hulu, Sony and Paramount.

== History ==
In May 2019, Berry Meyerowitz and Jeff Sackman founded Quiver Distribution, a company focused on distributing films throughout the United States and Canada across existing and future platforms. The founders had rights to The Fanatic and Running with the Devil at the time of the company's formation. In November 2019, Quiver formed a partnership with the newly formed Redbox Entertainment arm of Redbox to co-finance, co-produce and co-distribute films together, helping Redbox to move beyond its physical network of kiosks.

In 2020, Quiver Entertainment was formed as a sister company to Quiver Distribution, with the remit to be the "distribution and rights management" arm of Quiver.

In May 2020, the Quiver Entertainment arm of Quiver acquired the 1000 title library (not the complete library) of Kew Media Distribution following the demise of the firm's parent, Kew Media Group, in February 2020, beating out a group of about forty potential buyers.

== Filmography ==
=== 2010s ===
Release date	Title	Distribution
July 5, 2019	Phil	
July 26, 2019	Astronaut	
August 30, 2019	The Fanatic	
September 20, 2019	Running with the Devil	

=== 2020s ===
Release date	Title	Distribution
January 10, 2020	The Murder of Nicole Brown Simpson	
April 10, 2020	The Lost Husband	co-distribution with Redbox Entertainment
May 1, 2020	Tammy's Always Dying	
May 8, 2020	Walkaway Joe	
June 5, 2020	Becky	co-distribution with Redbox Entertainment
July 10, 2020	Money Plane	
July 17, 2020	The Sunlit Night	
August 14, 2020	Endless	
September 11, 2020	I Am Woman	
September 25, 2020	LX2048	
October 9, 2020	An Imperfect Murder	
November 13, 2020	Chick Fight	co-distribution with Redbox Entertainment
February 5, 2021	Falling	
February 26, 2021	Crisis	
March 25, 2021	Paradise City	
June 4, 2021	Grace and Grit	
July 30, 2021	The Exchange	
September 3, 2021	Karen	
March 4, 2022	The Changed	
April 8, 2022	As They Made Us	
September 23, 2022	Bandit	co-distribution with Redbox Entertainment
September 30, 2022	Dead for a Dollar	co-distribution with Myriad Pictures
October 7, 2022	Bromates	
October 14, 2022	Bitch Ass	
February 3, 2023	Erin's Guide To Kissing Girls	
May 26, 2023	The Wrath of Becky	
July 21, 2023	Fear the Night	
July 27, 2023	Happiness for Beginners	
August 4, 2023	The Collective	
November 3, 2023	The Christmas Classic	
January 19, 2024	Wanted Man	
February 16, 2024	Lights Out	
March 1, 2024	Outlaw Posse	
March 8, 2024	Night Shift	
April 5, 2024	A Bit of Light	
April 15, 2024	Irena's Vow	co-distribution with Elevation Pictures and WestEnd
June 11, 2024	Killer of Men	
June 14, 2024	Fresh Kills	
June 21, 2024	Agent Recon	
July 26, 2024	The Girl in the Pool	
August 2, 2024	Detained	
August 23, 2024	Summer of Violence	
August 30, 2024	First Shift	
September 13, 2024	The Waterboyz	
September 20, 2024	A Mistake	
November 8, 2024	American Meltdown	
October 4, 2024	The Problem with People	
October 11, 2024	Seven Cemeteries	
November 8, 2024	Love Bomb	
January 31, 2025	The Devil and the Daylong Brothers	
February 7, 2025	When I'm Ready	co-distribution with Briarcliff Entertainment
February 21, 2025	Cleaner	
March 7, 2025	The Silent Planet	
March 28, 2025	Meet Cute in Manhattan	
April 11, 2025	The Comic Shop	
May 2, 2025	Off The Record	
May 23, 2025	Restless	
June 13, 2025	The Other	
June 20, 2025	Inside	
June 27, 2025	The Last Front	Digital release only. Theatrical release by Enigma
July 11, 2025	Nuked	
July 18, 2025	Saint Clare	
July 25, 2025	Four Letters of Love	
July 25, 2025	Dog on Trial	
August 8, 2025	Hostile Takeover	
August 22, 2025	We Strangers	
September 19, 2025	London Calling	
September 19, 2025	Hunting Jessica Brok	
October 14, 2025	Guns & Moses	
October 17, 2025	Everything to Me	
October 31, 2025	The Wrecker	
November 7, 2025	The Beldham	
November 7, 2025	Long Shadows	
November 14, 2025	Run	
November 14, 2025	Deadly Vows	
November 21, 2025	Blue Eyed Girl	
November 25, 2025	Blood Star	
December 9, 2025	Down River	
January 16, 2026	The Confession	
February 6, 2026	Teacher's Pet	
February 20, 2026	Last Ride	
February 27, 2026	Noseeums	
March 13, 2026	Bank of Dave 2	
April 3, 2026	A Love Like This	
May 1, 2026	Modern Whore	
June 5, 2026	The Birthday Party	
June 19, 2026	Citizen Vigilante	
June 26, 2026	Above the Line	
July 10, 2026	The Outer Threat	
July 17, 2026	Kill Trip	
July 24, 2026	Kill Code	
August 21, 2026	A Mother's Secret	
September 4, 2026	Virginia Woolf's Night and Day	
September 4, 2026	Maya & Samar	
September 18, 2026	Sunny Dancer	
September 25, 2026	Long Day's Journey into Night	
October 2, 2026	Stranglehold	
October 9, 2026	A Prayer for the Dying	
November 4, 2026	The Last Temptation of Becky	
December 4, 2026	Eternal Return	
January 29, 2027	The Night of Broken Glass	
TBA	Paradise	
TBA	Killing Time	
