= Nima Fakhrara =

Iranian film composer

- Also known as: Nima Fahrara
- Born: Amir Nima Fakhrara; 12 November 1983 (age 43); Tehran, Iran
- Genre: Film scores
- Occupations: Composer, Music producer
- Instruments: Santour, Setar, Tar, Delnavaz, Tombak, Daf, Tabla
- Website: NimaFilmMusic.com

Amir Nima Fakhrara (born 12 November 1983 in Tehran, Iran), known professionally as Nima Fakhrara, is an Iranian film composer. He is based in Los Angeles.

== Filmography (Composer) ==
2007

- Tumblers Directed by Vinny Delay
- Broadway Bound Directed by Bandar Albuliwi
- Dopo La Morte Directed by Luis Ivan Garcia
- Traveled Elsewhere Directed by Edward Castellon & Eric Torres
- Heist Directed by Edward Castellon & Eric Torres
- Evolution Directed by Asif Ahmad

2008

- Lost Dream Directed By Asif Ahmad

2011

- The Courier Directed by Hany Abu-Assad

2013

- Gatchaman Directed by Toya Sato

2014

- The Signal Directed by William Eubank
- The Pyramid Directed by Grégory Levasseur

2015

- The Girl in the Photographs Directed by Nick Simon
- Detective versus Detective (Season 1) (11 episodes)
- Resident Evil: Revelations 2 (along with Kohta Suzuki and Ichiro Komoto) — video game directed by Yasuhiro Anpo

2016

- 1979 Revolution: Black Friday — video game directed by Navid Khonsari
- I Am a Hero Directed by Shinsuke Sato

2018

- Beyond White Space - Science fiction monster movie directed by Ken Locsmandi and starring Holt McCallany.
- Danger One Directed by Tom Oesch
- Detroit: Become Human — soundtrack for Connor in a video game directed by David Cage

2019

- Crypto - film

2020

- Becky - film
- Alone - film

2021

- The Devil Below - film

2022

- Lou

2023

- Sick - film

2024

- Warhammer 40,000: Space Marine 2 (along with Steve Molitz) - video game

2026

- The Last Temptation of Becky - film

== Filmography (Music Team) ==
2007

- Bee Movie Directed by Steve Hickner & Simon J. Smith - Score by Rupert Gregson-Williams
- The Seeker: The Dark is Rising Directed by David L. Cunningham - Score by Christophe Beck
- License to Wed Directed by Ken Kwapis - Score by Christophe Beck

2008

- Columbus Day Directed by Charles Burmeister - Score by Michael A. Levine
- Drillbit Taylor Directed by Steven Brill - Score by Christophe Beck

== Filmography (Music Team) TV ==
- Cold Case (Season 5) Produced by Jerry Bruckheimer & Jonathan Littman - Score by Michael A. Levine

Episode 1: "Thrill to Kill" - Original air date: 30 September 2007
Episode 2: "That Women" - Original air date: 30 September 2007
Episode 3: "Running Around" - Original air date: 30 September 2007
Episode 4: "Devil Music" - Original air date: 30 September 2007
Episode 5: "Thick As Thieves" - Original air date: 30 September 2007
Episode 6: "Wunderkind" - Original air date: 30 September 2007
Episode 7: "World's End" - Original air date: 30 September 2007
Episode 8: "It Takes A Village" - Original air date: 30 September 2007
Episode 9: "Boy Crazy" - Original air date: 30 September 2007
Episode 10: "Justice" - Original air date: 30 September 2007
Episode 11: "Family 8108" - Original air date: 30 September 2007
Episode 12: "Sabotage" - Original air date: 30 September 2007
Episode 13: "Spiders" - Original air date: 30 September 2007

== Musician ==
- "Rendition" Directed by Gavin Hood - Scored by Mark Killian & Paul Hepker

Santour

== Concert Music ==
- "Magicopolis" Performed by CSUN Studio Ensemble
- "Battle Ground" Performed by CSUN Studio Ensemble
- "Kingdom" Performed by CSUN Studio Ensemble
- "Heist" Performed by CSUN Studio Ensemble
