= Dion Lunadon =

New Zealand musician (born 1976)

- Born: Dion Palmer; 4 March 1976 (age 50)
- Origin: Auckland, New Zealand
- Genres: Garage punk, garage rock, punk rock, noise rock, power pop
- Occupation: Musician
- Instruments: Guitar, bass, vocals
- Years active: 1991–present
- Labels: Flying Nun, Festival Records, Hollywood Records, Sony Music Japan, Mute, Dead Oceans, Infectious Records, In The Red Records

Dion Lunadon (born 4 March 1976) is a New Zealand born musician. He is known for being the guitarist and singer of The D4 and bass player in A Place To Bury Strangers. He is also known for his high energy and often unpredictable stage presence.

== Early life ==
Lunadon was born Dion Palmer in Auckland, New Zealand.

== Career ==
Lunadon played with a number of New Zealand bands, including The Snitches, Marty Sauce and The Source, Nothing at All! and The Rainy Days. He has also played bass and sang with The Scavengers at various reformation shows

Lunadon was a member of the New Zealand rock band The D4, who produced 2 albums and several E.P.s and singles.

In 2009, Lunadon formed the band True Lovers.

In 2010, Lunadon joined New York noise rockers A Place To Bury Strangers. As well as regular stage performances, he played and wrote songs in this group on the albums Worship and Transfixation, the EP Onwards to the Wall and a number of other recordings.

In 2017 Lunadon released his debut solo album. In March 2020, Lunadon announced his departure from A Place To Bury Strangers. On June 10, 2022, Lunadon released his sophomore solo album Beyond Everything, followed by Systems Edge on November 14, 2023, both on In The Red Records.

== Discography ==
=== Studio albums ===
- 1995: Nothing at All!, Nothing at All!
- 2001: 6twenty, The D4
- 2005: Out of My Head, The D4
- 2009: True Lovers, True Lovers
- 2012: Worship, A Place To Bury Strangers
- 2015: Transfixiation, A Place To Bury Strangers
- 2017: Dion Lunadon, Dion Lunadon
- 2018: Pinned, A Place To Bury Strangers
- 2022: Beyond Everything, Dion Lunadon
- 2023: Systems Edge, Dion Lunadon

=== EPs ===
- 1993: Loophole, Nothing at All!
- 1994: Busted, Nothing at All!
- 1999: The D4, The D4
- 2012: Onwards to the Wall, A Place To Bury Strangers
- 2013: Strange Moon, A Place To Bury Strangers
- 2019 ‘’Fuzz Club Sessions’’, A Place To Bury Strangers
- 2019 ‘’Ice Cream Sucks’’, A Place To Bury Strangers
- 2020: ‘’Schreien’’, Dion Lunadon
- 2024: Memory Burn, Dion Lunadon

=== Singles ===
- 2000: "Ladies Man", The D4
- 2002: "Rock'n'Roll Motherfucker", The D4
- 2002: "Party", The D4
- 2002: "Come On!", The D4
- 2002: "Get Loose", The D4
- 2003: "Exit to the City", The D4
- 2004: "Sake Bomb", The D4
- 2005: "What I Want", The D4
- 2005: "Feel It Like It", The D4
- 2012: "Burning Plastic" / "Send Me Your Dreams", A Place To Bury Strangers
- 2012: "You Are The One", A Place To Bury Strangers
- 2012: "Leaving Tomorrow", A Place To Bury Strangers
- 2012: "And I'm Up", A Place To Bury Strangers
- 2012: "Less Artists More Condos Series", #1 split single with Ceremony, A Place To Bury Strangers
- 2013: "Raiser" 7", A Place To Bury Strangers
- 2015: "We've Come So Far" 7", A Place To Bury Strangers
- 2015: "Straight" 7", A Place To Bury Strangers
- 2016: "Com/Broke" 7", Dion Lunadon
- 2020: "When Will I Hold You Again", Dion Lunadon
