= Jack Awards =

Former Australian music awards

The Jack Awards were a former set of Australian music awards, run from 2004 until 2007.

== History ==
The Jack Awards began in 2004. They were sponsored by Tennessee whiskey company Jack Daniel's and broadcast on pay TV channel Channel [V] Australia. The awards were conceived by Damien Wilson, former creative director of Peer Group Media, to create a national platform that rewarded all areas of Australian live music, from bands to venues, tour art to guitarists and drummers rather than recorded releases. The awards were based on popular vote.

== Description ==
The nominees for each of the awards were selected by a panel of over 60 judges from the music industry including publishers, label A&R, promoters, radio DJs, music media and managers nationally. The awards were based on an online voting system. Voters voted over the internet or by SMS for their favourite musicians, bands, live venues, photographers, tour artwork and the Gentleman Jack award for services to Australian live music.

== Events ==
=== 2004 awards ===
The first Jack Awards ceremony was held on 8 June 2004 at the City Recital Hall in Sydney.

The ceremony was hosted by Jabba (Channel V), and presenters included Tommy Lee (of Mötley Crüe), Glenn A. Baker, Sarah McLeod, Chris Joannou (of Silverchair), and Yumi Stynes (from Channel [V]). Featuring live performances from Eskimo Joe, The Living End, and Spiderbait.

The winners for the Jack Awards 2004 were as follows:

- Best Band: Powderfinger
- Best Male: John Butler
- Best Female: Sarah McLeod (The Superjesus)
- Best Lead Guitar: Chris Cheney (The Living End)
- Best Bass Guitar: Scott Owen (The Living End)
- Best Drummer: Jon Coghill (Powderfinger)
- Best Newcomer: Jet
- Best Tour Art: James Bellisini for the Big Day Out
- Best Rock Photographer: Christopher Morris
- Best Live TV Appearance: Powderfinger on Rove Live

Best Venues:

- NSW: The Metro
- QLD: The Zoo
- VIC: Esplanade Hotel
- SA: UniBar
- ACT: The Green Room
- WA: Amplifier Bar

Gentleman Jack Award: Ken West and Vivien Lees (the Big Day Out)

=== 2005 awards ===
The second Jack Awards ceremony was held on 10 May 2005 at the Seymour Theatre in Sydney.

The ceremony was hosted by Jabba (Channel V), and included live performances from Dallas Crane, You Am I, and Tex Perkins & The Dark Horses.

The winners for the Jack Awards 2005 were as follows:

- Best Band: Eskimo Joe
- Best Male: Phil Jamieson (Grinspoon)
- Best Female: Katy Steele (Little Birdy)
- Best Lead Guitar: Chris Cheney (The Living End)
- Best Bass Guitar: Scott Owen (The Living End)
- Best Drummer: Mark 'Kram' Maher (Spiderbait)
- Best Newcomer: Missy Higgins
- Best Tour Art: Powderfinger, The Revolution
- Best Rock Photographer: Tony Mott
- Best Live TV Appearance: Grinspoon at the Rugby League Grand Final

Best Venues:

- NSW: Enmore Theatre
- QLD: The Zoo
- VIC: The Palace
- SA: Jade Monkey
- ACT: The Green Room
- WA: The Metro

Gentleman Jack Award: The Homebake Festival

=== 2006 awards ===
The third Jack Awards ceremony was held on 20 June 2006 at Star City Casino in Sydney.

The ceremony was hosted by Jabba (Channel V), and presenters included Mark Evans (of AC/DC), Yumi Stynes (from Channel [V]), Kim Moyes (of The Presets), Ian Moss (of Cold Chisel), Rosso (of Merrick and Rosso), Lara Bingle, and Ken West (promoter of the Big Day Out festival). Featured live performances from Van She, Ratcat, The Hard-Ons, and The Mess Hall.

Over 120,000 votes were cast.

The winners for the Jack Awards 2006 were as follows:

- Best Live Band: The Living End
- Best Male Performer: Chris Cheney (The Living End)
- Best Female Performer: Sarah Blasko
- Best Lead Guitarist: Pat Davern (Grinspoon)
- Best Bass Guitarist (Ian Rile Award): Chris Ross (Wolfmother)
- Best Drummer: Andy Strachan (The Living End)
- Best Live Newcomer: Faker
- Best Tour Art: James Bellisini for Grinspoon
- Best Rock Photographer: Tony Mott
- Best Live TV Appearance: The Living End on the Channel V Bus, Melbourne

Best Venues:

- NSW: The Annandale
- QLD: The Zoo
- VIC: The Corner Hotel
- SA: Thebarton Theatre
- ACT: The Green Room
- WA: Amplifier Bar

Gentleman Jack Award: Michael Chugg (promoter)

=== 2007 awards ===
The fourth annual Jack Awards ceremony was held on 15 May 2007 at Luna Park in Sydney.

The ceremony was hosted by Jabba (ex-Channel [V] Australia VJ), and presenters included Melanie Greensmith (founder of Wheels and Doll Baby), Mark McEntee (Divinyls), Erin McNaught (Miss Australia 2006), Merrick and Rosso, and Ronnie Johns. The crowd was treated to live performances from Airbourne, Beasts of Bourbon, Mercy Arms, You Am I (who performed a tribute to Billy Thorpe), Howling Bells, and Angry Anderson's All Star Jam (which included members of You Am I, The Divinyls, Grinspoon, and The Sleepy Jackson).

The winners of the Jack Awards 2007 are as follows:

- Best Live Band: Wolfmother
- Best Male Performer: Daniel Johns (Silverchair)
- Best Female Performer: Katy Steele
- Best Lead Guitarist: Chris Cheney (The Living End)
- Best Bass Guitarist (Ian Rile Award): Andy Kent (You Am I)
- Best Drummer: Ben Gilles (Silverchair)
- Best Live Newcomer: Red Riders
- Best Dressed: Katy Steele (Little Birdy)
- Best International Touring Act: : Foo Fighters
- Best Tour Art: Big Day Out 2006 (James Bellesini,

Best Live Venue:

- NSW: The Gaelic Club
- ACT: The Basement
- SA: Governor Hindmarsh Hotel
- VIC: Palace Nightclub
- QLD: The Zoo
- WA: Amplifier Bar

Gentleman Jack Award: Michael Gudinski

== Most wins ==
Only three artists have won more than one award so far.

- The Living End – 8 awards; winning 4 in 2006 (the most yet), 2 in 2005 (jointly winning the most with Grinspoon), and 2 in 2004.
- Powderfinger – 4 awards; 3 won in 2004 (the most that year), and 1 in 2005.
- Grinspoon – 4 awards; 2 won in 2006, and 2 won in 2005 (jointly winning the most in 2005 with The Living End).
