= See Through You =

Studio album by A Place to Bury Strangers
- Released: February 4, 2022
- Length: 52:33
- Label: Dedstrange

A Place to Bury Strangers chronology
Pinned (2018)	See Through You (2022)

Singles from See Through You
- 1. "Let's See Each Other" Released: November 16, 2021; 2. "Hold on Tight" Released: December 7, 2021; 3. "I'm Hurt" Released: January 18, 2022; 4. "I Disappear (When You're Near)" Released: February 4, 2022

See Through You is the sixth studio album by noise rock band A Place to Bury Strangers. It was released on February 4, 2022, by Dedstrange.

== Release ==
On November 16, 2021, the band announced the release of the album, alongside the first single "Let's See Each Other". On December 7, the band released their second single "Hold On Tight". "I'm Hurt", the album's third single, was released on January 18, 2022. The single "I Disappear (When You're Near)" and its accompanying music video was released alongside the album on February 4, 2022.

== Reception ==
Professional ratings
Aggregate scores
Source	Rating
Metacritic	81/100
Review scores
Source	Rating
AllMusic	4.5/5 stars

See Through You was acclaimed by critics. At Metacritic, which assigns a normalized rating out of 100 to reviews from mainstream publications, the album received an average score of 81, based on eight reviews, indicating "universal acclaim".

== Track listing ==
All tracks are written by Oliver Ackermann.

See Through You track listing
No.	Title	Length
1.	"Nice of You to Be There for Me"	3:42
2.	"I'm Hurt"	5:05
3.	"Let's See Each Other"	3:54
4.	"So Low"	3:51
5.	"Dragged in a Hole"	2:59
6.	"Ringing Bells"	2:56
7.	"I Disappear (When You're Near)"	4:05
8.	"Anyone but You"	3:19
9.	"My Head Is Bleeding"	3:27
10.	"Broken"	4:01
11.	"Hold On Tight"	4:01
12.	"I Don't Know How You Do It"	5:40
13.	"Love Reaches Out"	5:25
Total length:		52:33

== Personnel ==
- Oliver Ackermann – performance
- Paul Jacobs – drums on "Anyone but You"
- Ana Breton – vocals on "I Don't Know How You Do It"
