= Transfixiation =

Studio album by A Place to Bury Strangers
- Released: February 17, 2015
- Genre: Noise rock
- Length: 39:14
- Label: Dead Oceans
- Producers: A Place to Bury Strangers; Emil Nikolaisen

A Place to Bury Strangers chronology
Strange Moon (2013)	Transfixiation (2015)	Pinned (2018)

Singles from Transfixiation
- 1. "Straight" Released: November 19, 2014; 2. "We've Come So Far" Released: January 14, 2015

Transfixiation ratings
Aggregate scores
Source	Rating
AnyDecentMusic?	6.4/10
Metacritic	65/100
Review scores
Source	Rating
The A.V. Club	B
Consequence of Sound	C-
DIY	2/5 stars
Exclaim!	7/10
The Line of Best Fit	7.5/10
Paste	6.8/10
Pitchfork	5.5/10
PopMatters	5/10
Spin	7/10
Under the Radar	6/10 stars

Transfixiation is the fourth studio album by the American noise rock band A Place to Bury Strangers, released February 17, 2015, by Dead Oceans.

== Singles and music videos ==
The album was preceded by the singles "Straight", released November 19, 2014, and "We've Come So Far", released January 14, 2015. Both songs received music videos: the video for "Straight" was released December 6, 2014, directed by Brook Linder, and features a TV station's signal being hijacked in order to display "a nightmare of analog psychedelia and haunted pop culture imagery", inspired by the Max Headroom broadcast signal intrusion of 1987. The "We've Come So Far" video was released February 19, 2015, and contains footage of the last show at Williamsburg, Brooklyn concert venue Death By Audio which was directed by the venue's co-founder Matt Conboy.

== Track listing ==
Transfixiation track listing
No.	Title	Length
1.	"Supermaster"	3:21
2.	"Straight"	3:22
3.	"Love High"	1:55
4.	"What We Don't See"	2:25
5.	"Deeper"	6:08
6.	"Lower Zone"	2:31
7.	"We've Come So Far"	5:07
8.	"Now It's Over"	4:09
9.	"I'm So Clean"	2:41
10.	"Fill the Void"	4:21
11.	"I Will Die"	3:14
Total length:		39:14

== Personnel ==
Musicians

- Oliver Ackermann – vocals, guitar, bass
- Dion Lunadon – bass, guitar, backing vocals (8)
- Robi Gonzalez – drums
- Emil Nikolaisen – guitar (5, 7)
- Emilie Lium Vordal – vocals (5, 7)

Technical

- A Place to Bury Strangers – producers, recording engineers
- Emil Nikolaisen – producer (5, 7)
- Oliver Ackermann – mastering engineer
- Miles Johnson – artwork, design
