= Onwards to the Wall =

EP by A Place to Bury Strangers
- Released: February 7, 2012
- Genres: Shoegazing, indie rock, noise rock
- Length: 16:41
- Label: Dead Oceans

A Place to Bury Strangers chronology
Exploding Head (2009)	Onwards to the Wall (2012)	Worship (2012)

Onwards to the Wall is an EP by the Brooklyn-based noise rock band A Place to Bury Strangers, released on February 7, 2012, on the Dead Oceans label.

== Reception ==
According to Metacritic, Onwards to the Wall has an average score of 75 out of 100, indicating that it has received generally favorable reviews from critics.

Professional ratings
Review scores
Source	Rating
AllMusic	3.5/5 stars
The Boston Phoenix	3.5/4 stars
Drowned in Sound	8/10
MSN Music (Expert Witness)	A–
Pitchfork	5.8/10
PopMatters	8/10 stars

== Track listing ==
1. I Lost You
2. So Far Away
3. Onwards to the Wall
4. Nothing Will Surprise Me
5. Drill it Up
