= The D4 =

New Zealand rock band

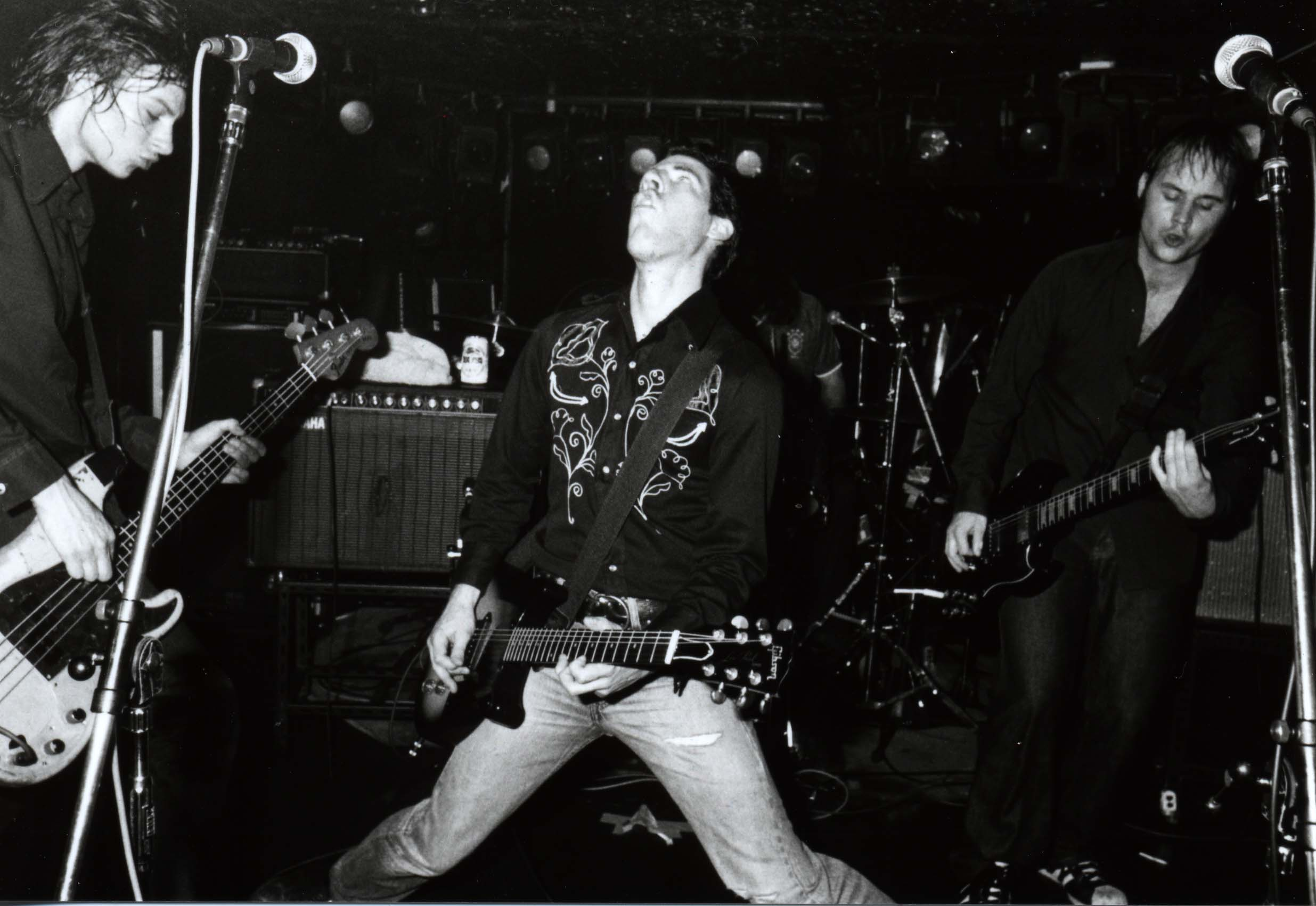
- The D4 at Shinjuku-Jam, Tokyo, Japan

Background information
- Origin: Auckland, New Zealand
- Genres: Garage rock; garage punk; post-punk revival
- Years active: 1998–2006
- Labels: Hollywood Records (US); Flying Nun Records; Infectious Records; l.b.W Ent Records
- Past members: Dion Palmer; Jimmy Christmas; Vaughan Williams; Daniel Pooley; Rich Mixture; English Jake; Paul Reid

The D4 were a rock band from Auckland, New Zealand. Their music was released by Hollywood Records in the U.S., Flying Nun Records in New Zealand and by Infectious Records in the UK.

The group was assembled by vocalist/guitarists Dion Palmer and Jimmy Christmas, who put together a collection of songs and built a four-piece combo, featuring founding members English Jake and Rich Mixture, during late 1998 and started playing at the Frisbee Leisure Lounge parties along Symonds Street, followed shortly thereafter by inner city pub gigs. They have also played at the Big Day Out and at the SXSW Music Festival in Austin, Texas.

The group's debut EP was released by Flying Nun Records in 1999 featuring the tracks "Girl" and "Come On!" The band was later enhanced by members Vaughan Williams (Vaughn) (bass) and Daniel Pooley (Beaver) (drums). The D4 went on a UK tour supporting the Hives.

As of May 2006, Breakfast announced that after eight years, the D4, would be taking an indefinite break from the music industry. After the split, Rich Mixture went on to replace Paul Robertson as the drummer of The Rock n Roll Machine, bassist Vaughn joined Shocking Pinks, an Auckland-based indie pop act and Jimmy Christmas formed the rock group Luger Boa who have supported Shihad on tour. Most recently, Dion has moved to NYC, formed a new band called the True Lovers and also plays bass in A Place to Bury Strangers.

== Discography ==
=== Studio albums ===
Year	Title	Peak chart positions
Year	Title	NZ
2001	6twenty: Released: October 26, 2001; Label: Flying Nun Records	28
2005	Out of My Head: Released: February 25, 2005; Label: Flying Nun Records	17
"—" denotes a recording that did not chart or was not released in that territory.

=== Featured appearances ===
The group have appeared on some compilations and soundtracks since the early 2000s. The following is a list of these albums that have featured tracks by The D4.

Year	Album	Label	Track(s)
1999	Boss TV	Boss TV	"Come On!"
2000	Stickmen	Universal Music	"Come On!"
2002	Under the Influence	Flying Nun Records	"Joe 90" (Bored Games cover) and "Get Loose"
2002	Head Up!!! Music From the 2002 Bnet New Zealand Music Awards	Festival Mushroom	"John Rock"
2002	Channel Z: The Best of Vol. 3	Warner Bros. Records	"Exit to the City"
2003	Red Surf Godzone Surfer's Soundtrack	EMI	"Joe 90"
2003	Get a Haircut	Zerox	"Rock'n'Roll Motherfucker"
2004	The Prince & Me	EMI	"Party"
2005	Big Day Out 05	EMI	"Sake Bomb"
2005	Unleashed 2005	Sony BMG	"Sake Bomb"

=== Singles ===
Year	Title	Peak chart positions	Album
Year	Title	UK	Album
2002	"Rock'n'Roll Motherfucker"	—	6twenty
2002	"Party"	85	6twenty
2002	"Come On!"	50	6twenty
2002	"Get Loose"	64	6twenty
2003	"Ladies Man"	41	6twenty
2003	"Exit to the City"	—	6twenty
2004	"Sake Bomb"	—	Out Of My Head
2005	"What I Want"	—	Out Of My Head
2005	"Feel It Like It"	—	Out Of My Head
"—" denotes a recording that did not chart or was not released in that territory.

== See also ==
- Garage rock
- Music of New Zealand
