= Exploding head =

Exploding head may refer to:

- a meme that originated in the 1981 film Scanners
- Exploding Head, an album by the rock band A Place to Bury Strangers
- Exploding head syndrome
