= Sedative (disambiguation) =

A general anaesthetic is also known as a sedative. Other uses of the term sedative include:

- Sedative (band), an Australian deathcore band

== See also ==
- Sedation
