= In Your Heart =

Single by A Place to Bury Strangers

from the album Exploding Head
- A-side: "In Your Heart"
- B-side: "Strictly Looks"
- Released: August 24, 2009
- Genre: Noise rock, psychedelic rock, post-punk revival, shoegaze
- Length: 16:01
- Label: Mute Records
- Songwriter(s): Oliver Ackermann, Jonathan Smith, Jason Weilminster

"In Your Heart" is the first single released from A Place To Bury Strangers's major label debut album, Exploding Head. The single contains the lead track, along with two remixes and the B-side "Strictly Looks"

== Track listing ==
No.	Title	Length
1.	"In Your Heart"	3:08
2.	"In Your Heart (Cereal Spiller Remix)"	3:52
3.	"In Your Heart / Lost Feeling (Vince Clarke Remix)"	4:44
4.	"Strictly Looks"	4:17
