= Discrespective =

Live album

Compilation album by Various Artists
- Released: 2002
- Recorded: Various Times
- Label: Shock Music

Various Artists chronology
Discrespective (2002)	Big Day Out 03 (2003)

Discrespective is a 2002 New Zealand/Australian compilation album published by Shock Music. It contains a 3-disc set of music from the Big Day Out music festival to celebrate its 10-year anniversary.

== Track listing ==
=== Disc one ===
1. "I Wanna Be Sedated" - The Ramones
2. "Good Fortune" - PJ Harvey
3. "Where The Wild Roses Grow" - Nick Cave and the Bad Seeds
4. "Human Behaviour" - Björk
5. "Generator" - Foo Fighters
6. "What's My Age Again?" - Blink-182
7. "Bottles to the Ground" - NOFX
8. "Your Are Not My Friend" - Frenzal Rhomb
9. "Pace It" - Magic Dirt
10. "Black Stick" - The Cruel Sea
11. "Caught By the Fuzz" - Supergrass
12. "Monty" - Spiderbait
13. "Happiness" - Regurgitator
14. "My Mind's Sedate" - Shihad
15. "Bullet" - Superheist
16. "Champion" - Grinspoon
17. "Greg! The Stop Sign" - TISM
18. "Go Go" - Ratcat

=== Disc two ===
1. "The Day You Come" - Powderfinger
2. "Special K" - Placebo
3. "Israel's Son" - Silverchair
4. "We're In This Together" - Nine Inch Nails
5. "Wild America" - Iggy Pop
6. "Jesus Built My Hotrod" - Ministry
7. "Links 2 3 4" - Rammstein
8. "Tribe" - Soulfly
9. "Chase The Dragon" - Beasts of Bourbon
10. "Soldiers" - You Am I
11. "If You Tolerate This Your Children Will Be Next" - Manic Street Preachers
12. "Soul Eater" - The Clouds
13. "D.C." - Died Pretty
14. "Stolen Car" - Beth Orton
15. "Yellow" - Coldplay
16. "Girl Trouble" - Violent Femmes
17. "Neva Mend" - Nokturn

=== Disc three ===
1. "Movin' Up" - Primal Scream
2. "Crystal" - New Order
3. "Red Alert" - Basement Jaxx
4. "The Rockafeller Skank" - Fatboy Slim
5. "Out of Control" - Chemical Brothers
6. "Breathe" - The Prodigy
7. "Television, The Drug of the Nation" - The Disposable Heroes of Hiphoprisy
8. "For The Love of It" - Salmonella Dub
9. "Black Steel" - Tricky
10. "Brown Paper Bag" - Roni Size
11. "E-Ville" - sonicanimation
12. "Born Slippy .NUXX" - Underworld
