= Big Day Out 06 =

Compilation album by Various Artists
- Released: 2006
- Label: EMI Records

Various Artists chronology
Big Day Out 05 (2005)	Big Day Out 06 (2006)

Big Day Out 06 is a New Zealand compilation album released to coincide with the Big Day Out music festival in 2006. To date, this was the last album released in this series.

== Track listing ==
1. "I Wanna Be Your Dog" – Iggy & the Stooges
2. "The Denial Twist" – The White Stripes
3. "Do You Want To" – Franz Ferdinand
4. "L'Via L'Viaquez" – The Mars Volta
5. "Mind's Eye" – Wolfmother
6. "Good Timing" – Gerling
7. "Going Nowhere" – Cut Copy
8. "Are You The One?" – The Presets
9. "NY Excuse (Remix)" – Soulwax
10. "Entertain" – Sleater-Kinney
11. "King of the Rodeo" – Kings of Leon
12. "What's On Your Radio" – The Living End
13. "Forget To Remember" – Mudvayne
14. "O Yeah" – End of Fashion
15. "The Sentinel" – Hilltop Hoods
16. "Testify" – Common
17. "Galang 05" – M.I.A.
18. "Bottle Rocket" – The Go! Team
19. "Locket" – Magic Dirt
20. "Hurricane" – Faker
21. "Forever Lost" – The Magic Numbers
