= Big Day Out 05 =

Compilation album by Various Artists
- Released: December 2004
- Label: EMI Records

Various Artists chronology
Big Day Out 04 (2004)	Big Day Out 05 (2004)	Big Day Out 06 (2006)

Big Day Out 05 is a 2004 New Zealand compilation album, published by EMI Music Australia, to coincide with the Big Day Out music festival in 2005.

== Track listing ==
1. Rizzle Rizzle Nizzle Nizzle - Beastie Boys
2. Boom! - System of a Down
3. Stumblin' - Powderfinger
4. Fall behind Me - The Donnas
5. Hard Act to Follow - Grinspoon
6. Two-Timing Touch and Broken Bones - The Hives
7. Fit But You Know It - The Streets
8. The Drop - Regurgitator
9. Not Many - The Remix - Scribe featuring Savage of the Deceptikonz and Con Psy of Frontline
10. Get a Life - Freestylers
11. Tonite - Concord Dawn
12. Get Yourself High - The Chemical Brothers featuring K-OS
13. Better World - Infusion
14. 'Duality' - Slipknot
15. Cessation - The Music
16. Sake Bomb - The D4
17. Black Betty - Spiderbait
18. Tonight's the Night - Little Birdy
19. Older Than You - Eskimo Joe
20. Something's Gotta Give - The John Butler Trio
21. Section 12 (Hold Me Now) - The Polyphonic Spree
