= Unleashed 2005 =

Studio album by Various artists
- Released: 2005
- Recorded: Various times
- Label: Sony BMG

Various artists chronology
Unleashed 2005 (2005)	Unleashed 2006 (2006)

Unleashed 2005 is a New Zealand compilation rock album released in 2005.

== Track listing ==
1. "Remedy" - Seether
2. "Vertigo" - U2
3. "Mr. Brightside" - The Killers
4. "Be Yourself" - Audioslave
5. "Beverly Hills" - Weezer
6. "Photograph" - Nickelback
7. "Behind Those Eyes" - 3 Doors Down
8. "So Cold" - Breaking Benjamin
9. "Word Up!" - Korn
10. "Happy?" - Mudvayne
11. "Little Sister" - Queens of the Stone Age
12. "Talk Shows on Mute" - Incubus
13. "Disappear" - Hoobastank
14. "Broken Wings" - Alter Bridge
15. "Better Off Alone" - Grinspoon
16. "Zebra" - John Butler Trio
17. "Cold Hard Bitch" - Jet
18. "Yours Truly" - Blindspott
19. "Sake Bomb" - The D4
20. "I Hate Everything About You" - Three Days Grace
