= A Place to Bury Strangers (album) =

Studio album by A Place to Bury Strangers
- Released: September 17, 2007
- Recorded: 2003 – 2007
- Genre: Shoegaze; noise rock; post-punk revival; experimental rock
- Length: 40:57
- Label: Killer Pimp; Rocket Girl
- Producer: A Place to Bury Strangers

A Place to Bury Strangers chronology
A Place to Bury Strangers (2007)	Exploding Head (2009)

A Place to Bury Strangers is the debut studio album by American shoegazing band A Place to Bury Strangers, released on September 17, 2007.

== Release ==
Most of the album's songs were recorded between 2004 and 2006 and were released as a series of ad hoc EPs which were sold at shows by the band. The band came to the attention of Killer Pimp owner Jon Whitney in late 2006 and he asked if he could have the songs remastered and release them as an album on CD. The band deliberated over whether this would be a good move for some time before finally agreeing. The album was released in a limited edition in August 2007. This soon sold out and several repressings were made. As of March 2008 further pressings are ongoing. The album was also released on vinyl by Important Records as a limited edition of 1,000 copies with 300 on clear vinyl and 700 on black. These sold out and a second edition of 1,000 with 300 on red/white splatter was pressed. A third pressing of 1,000 was made with the first 300 on white in July 2008.

"To Fix the Gash in Your Head" appears on the Nine Inch Nails online release Lights in the Sky: Over North America 2008 Tour Sampler, which contains music from the opening acts, including A Place to Bury Strangers, of some concerts of the Lights in the Sky tour.

== Critical reception ==
Professional ratings
Aggregate scores
Source	Rating
Metacritic	80/100
Review scores
Source	Rating
AllMusic	4/5 stars
DIY	9/10
The Guardian	3/5 stars
The Irish Times	4/5 stars
MusicOMH	4/5 stars
NME	7/10
Pitchfork	8.4/10
PopMatters	8/10
Q	4/5 stars
Uncut	4/5 stars

In 2016, Pitchfork ranked A Place to Bury Strangers at number 38 on its list of "The 50 Best Shoegaze Albums of All Time".

== Track listing ==
All tracks are written by A Place to Bury Strangers.

No.	Title	Length
1.	"Missing You"	3:53
2.	"Don't Think Lover"	3:25
3.	"To Fix the Gash in Your Head"	3:51
4.	"The Falling Sun"	5:19
5.	"Another Step Away"	4:12
6.	"Breathe"	3:43
7.	"I Know I'll See You"	4:06
8.	"She Dies"	3:48
9.	"My Weakness"	2:41
10.	"Ocean"	5:59
Total length:		40:57
