= Sedative (band) =

Australian band

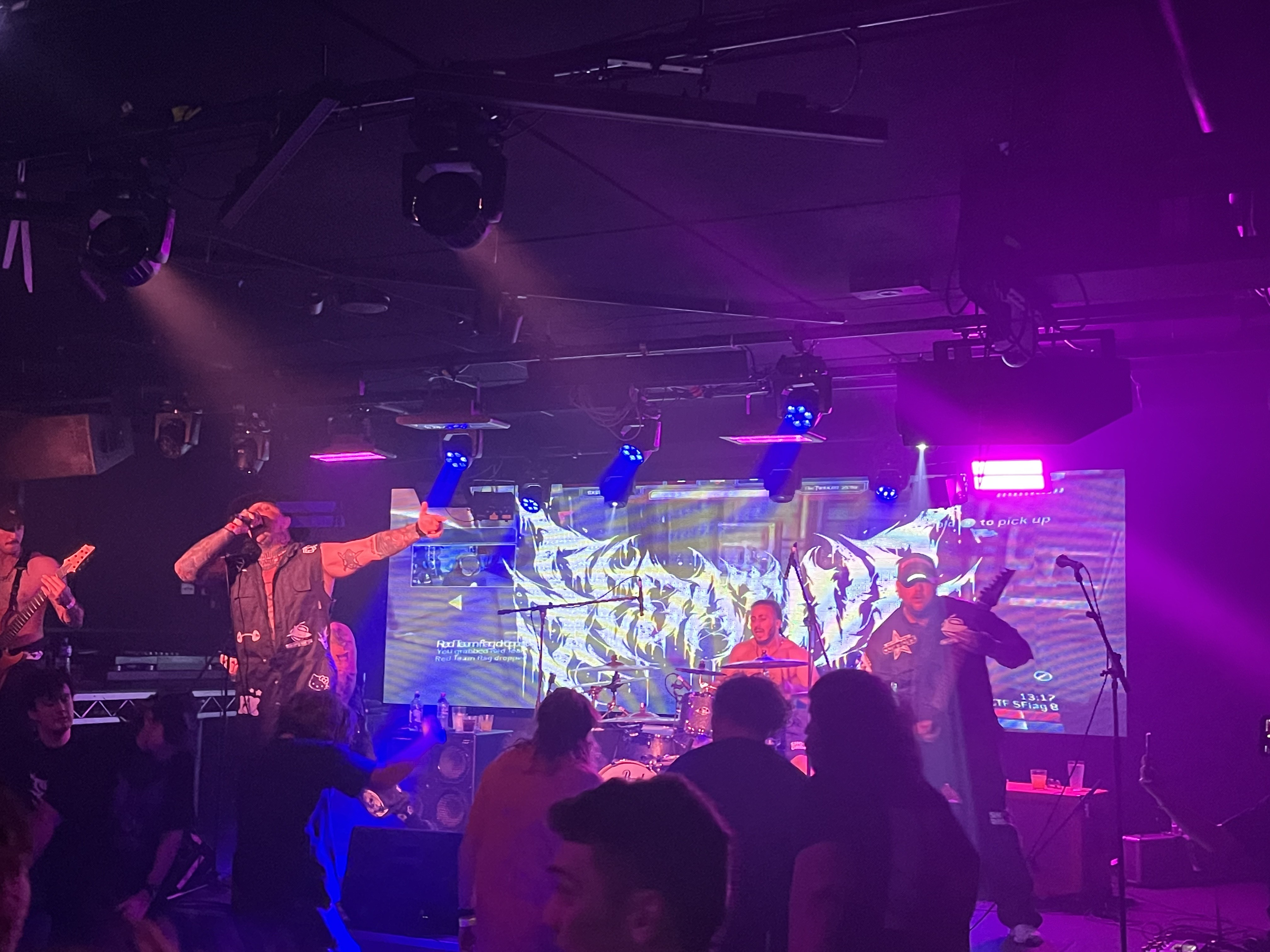
- Sedative performing at TerrorLoud Darwin 2025

Background information
- Origin: Perth, Western Australia, Australia
- Genres: Beatdown hardcore, deathcore
- Years active: 2021–present
- Label: Independent
- Members: Matthew Daly (Blanche Dubrah); Ryan Spencer; Silvestro Fontanarosa; Benjamin Reay; Ryan Wiseman
- Past members: André Avila; Nathan Wolfenden; Raphael Abadi; Scott Foster
- Website: Instagram

Sedative is an Australian deathcore band from Perth, formed in 2021. The band currently consists of vocalist Matthew Daly (Blanche Dubrah),guitarists Benjamin Reay and Ryan Wiseman, bassist Ryan Spencer, and drummer Silverstein Fontonarosa. Sedative have released one LP to date; Death Romantic, and one studio album; Love is Not Enough.

== History ==
=== Formation and early singles (2021) ===
Sedative was formed from remnants of Grenade Brain, a previous band that Matthew Daly (Blanche Dubrah) ,Raphael Abadi, and Ryan Spencer were part of. the initial lineup consisted of Dubrah on vocals, Abadi on guitar, André Avila performing guitar and backing vocals, Spencer on bass and vocals, and drummer Nathan Wolfenden. The band debuted with the single "Cough Medicine" on 9 June 2021, accompanied by a music video directed by Avila and Dubrah. The track delves into themes of coping mechanisms and mental health struggles, setting the tone for the band's thematic focus. The band performed their first shows under the Sedative name on 25 and 26 June in Perth and Bunbury supporting the Melbourne metalcore band Vengeance.

Subsequent singles included "No Hard Feelings" released on 15 September, and "Vile" which released on 3 December, the latter described as a relentless composition addressing substance abuse and self-worth. Between these singles, the band performed their first interstate show in Adelaide, South Australia on 28 October.

=== Death Romantic and HELL:AM (2022–2023) ===
On 11 March 2022, Sedative released the single "Romilda Vane" as well as the announcement of an upcoming EP Death Romantic. Their next single from the EP "Godspeed" was released on 8 April, alongside an animated music video. "Godspeed" was noted for its hardcore-influenced vocals and blistering riffs. The third and final single off the EP "Unlove" was released on 11 May and highlighted as a flagship single representing the album’s sonic direction. Sedative's EP was then released on 20 May, which included their previously released singles and some new tracks.

On 8 July, Sedative performed in Northbridge, supporting Saviour. On 14 July, they supported the American deathcore band Fit for an Autopsy as local support, during the band's Perth-leg of their Australia-wide tour, marking the first time the band had supported an international act. On 9 September, Sedative performed at the Amplifier Bar in Perth as part of ATLVS's "The Wound, The Blade" Australian Tour. On 30 September, Sedative released a new single "Midnight Valentine", the single was accompanied by a music video. The band performed at the Amplifier Bar again on 18 November, supporting Saviour again, this time for their Australian Tour.

On 10 February 2023, Sedative release the two-track EP HE:LL AM that featured the previously released "Midnight Valentine" and the track "Heavy Lies The Head". The band later supported the Slovenian metalcore band Within Destruction on 5 March in Northcote, Victoria.

=== Line-up change (2023–present) ===
At some point prior to June 2023, founding guitarist André Avila left the band for unspecified reasons though still remained involved in the video production for its music videos. He was replaced as guitarist by Scott Foster. The band then performed at TerrorLoud 2 in Darwin on 10 June, which was headlined by Make Them Suffer. Their first single of the year "Ain't No Love" was then released on 30 June with an accompanying music video. The following single "Romeo" was released on 15 September with a music video. "Romeo" was described as a magnetic and searing track that highlighted the band’s evolution. Sometime during 2023, drummer Nathan Wolfenden also departed the band and was replaced with Silverstein Fontonarosa.

Their single "Lake City Quiet Pills", released on 17 May 2024, continued their trajectory with a strong reception in the Australian heavy community. Following that, the band performed a national tour from 23 May-2 June in the major east coast cities, ending with a Perth performance on 21 June. Sedative then embarked on their first international tour in Southeast Asia throughout early November. Performing in Singapore, Bangkok, and at BLVCK FEST in Hanoi. Sometime during 2024, guitarists Raphael Abadi and Scott Foster were replaced by Benjamin Reay and Ryan Wiseman.

In April 2025, news of a criminal court proceeding against lead vocalist Matthew Daly for Common Assault in circumstances of Aggravation or racial Aggravation came to light following his arrest. In a separate incident, Daly was charged in November 2025 with visually recording a private activity without consent. He first appeared in the Magistrates Court in December 2025 in relation to a police summons, and the matter subsequently proceeded to a criminal trial listed for March 2026. The band has not publicly commented on either of the cases against Daly.

== Musical style and themes ==
Sedative's sound is rooted in deathcore, slam, and metallic hardcore, blending crushing breakdowns, blast beats, and growling vocals. Lyrically, they explore themes of mental health, grief, addiction, and existential dread, aiming for a cathartic and emotionally intense experience. They also self-describe as death metal, nu-deathcore, and beatdown hardcore throughout their Bandcamp website, the handle "sedativehc" also identifies them as hardcore. The BLVCK FEST organisers Dev Records also listed the band as beatdown on the official poster. Their music has been featured on Triple J's The Racket and Spotify’s "Homegrown & Heavy" playlist, and they have accrued over 150,000 streams across platforms.

== Members ==
Current

- Matthew Daly – unclean vocals (2021–present)
- Benjamin Reay – lead guitar (2024–present)
- Ryan Wiseman – rhythm guitar (2024–present)
- Ryan Spencer – bass, backing vocals (2021–present)
- Silverstein Fontonarosa – drums (2023–present)

Former

- André Avila – rhythm guitar, backing vocals (2021–2023)
- Raphael Abadi – lead guitar (2021–2024)
- Scott Foster – rhythm guitar (2023–2024)
- Nathan Wolfenden – drums (2021–2023)

Timeline

== Discography ==
=== Studio albums ===
List of studio albums
Title	Album details
Love Is Not Enough	Released: 6 June 2025; Label: Independent; Format: Vinyl, digital download, streaming

=== Long plays ===
List of long plays
Title	Album details
Death Romantic	Released: 20 May 2022; Label: Independent; Format: Vinyl, digital download, streaming

=== Extended plays ===
List of extended plays
Title	Album details
HE:LL AM	Released: 10 February 2023; Label: Independent; Format: digital download, streaming

=== Singles ===
Title	Year	Album
"Cough Medicine"	2021	Non-album singles
"No Hard Feelings"	2021	Non-album singles
"Vile"	2021	Non-album singles
"Romilda Vane"	2022	Death Romantic
"Godspeed"	2022	Death Romantic
"Unlove"	2022	Death Romantic
"Midnight Valentine"	2022	HE:LL AM
"Ain't No Love"	2023	Non-album single
"Romeo"	2023	Love Is Not Enough
"Lake City Quiet Pills"	2024	Love Is Not Enough
"12 Gauge Apology"	2025	Love Is Not Enough
