= A Place to Bury Strangers =

New York City-based noise rock band

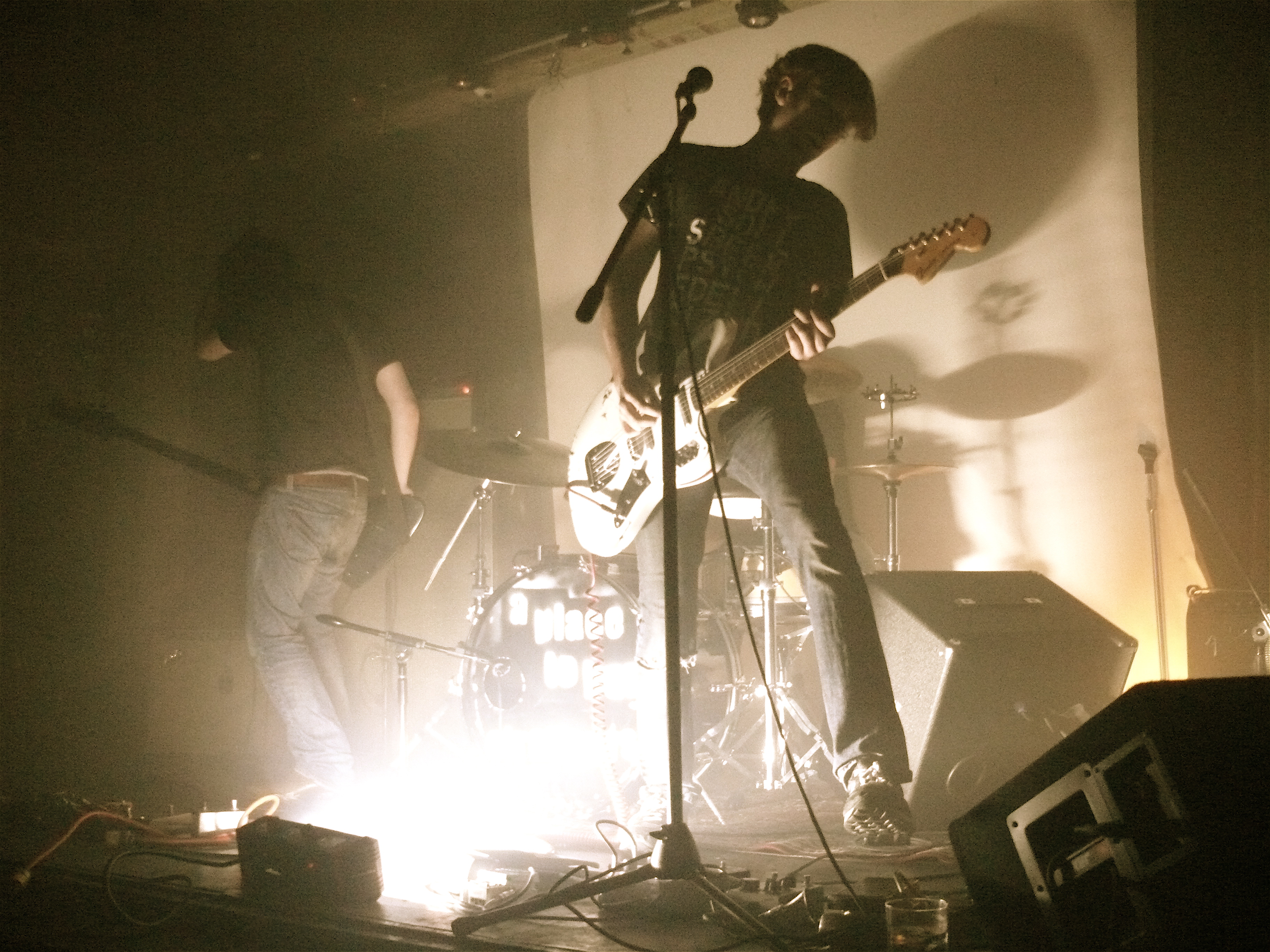
- A Place to Bury Strangers performing in 2007

Background information
- Origin: Brooklyn, New York, United States
- Genres: Noise rock; post-punk revival; shoegaze; experimental rock; psychedelic rock; space rock; industrial rock
- Years active: 2003–present
- Labels: Killer Pimp; Rocket Girl; Mute; Dead Oceans; Dedstrange
- Members: Oliver Ackermann; Sandra Fedowitz; John Fedowitz
- Past members: David Goffan; Tim Gregorio; Jonathan "Jono Mofo" Smith; Jason "Jay Space" Weilmeister; Justin Avery; Robi Gonzalez; Dion Lunadon; Lia Simone Braswell
- Website: aplacetoburystrangers.bandcamp.com

A Place to Bury Strangers are an American rock band formed in 2002, in New York City. The trio is currently composed of Oliver Ackermann (guitar/vocals, bass), John Fedowitz (bass guitar) and Sandra Fedowitz (drums). Commonly known by the initials APTBS, the band plays a heavy, atmospheric Wall of Sound–influenced blend of noise rock, shoegaze and space rock.

The band is known for the loudness of their intense live shows. A Place to Bury Strangers are commonly referred to by music writers as the "loudest band in New York", a reputation the band developed even before the release of their first album.

== History ==
=== Early days ===
A Place to Bury Strangers were formed in 2002 by David Goffan and Tim Gregorio. Current frontman and guitarist Ackermann had moved to New York from the Rhode Island School of Design following the disbanding of his previous group, Skywave, to join APTBS, and become the primary songwriter after the departure of Goffan. Ackermann also founded the guitar pedal company Death By Audio. They played their first show at Luxx in Brooklyn in 2003. Jason "Jay Space" Weilmeister and Jonathan "Jono Mofo" Smith, both from the New York City-based band MOFO, joined the band when Gregorio left. In 2006, APTBS self-released three different EPs, handmade with different color schemes: Breathe, Missing You and Never Going Down.

In 2006, APTBS gained acclaim following their Webster Hall performance with the Brian Jonestown Massacre. The band returned to Webster Hall in 2007 to play with one of their major influences, the Jesus and Mary Chain. Throughout these formative years, the band's live shows became increasingly chaotic, which earned them the title of New York City's "loudest band" from various indie reviewers and bloggers, as well as "the most ear-shatteringly loud garage/shoegaze band you'll ever hear" by The Washington Post. The New York Times applauded their revival of "the ominous, feedback-drenched drones of the 1980s".

=== First album and touring ===
In 2007, Jon Whitney from the Killer Pimp label wrote the contract for their first album, A Place to Bury Strangers, on a napkin. In August 2007, the band gained national attention after a favorable Pitchfork review of this album.

In 2007, the band joined Black Rebel Motorcycle Club on the "Holy Fuck" tour. In April 2008, it was announced that APTBS would open for Nine Inch Nails on several dates of the latter's US tour. That year, the band played the Primavera Sound festival in Barcelona. Following several UK gigs, the first album was issued in the UK in October 2008 by Rocket Girl, and they received strong praise from the British media including NME and Kerrang!. In November 2008, the band returned to Europe and the UK on tour supporting MGMT.

=== Exploding Head ===
In early 2009, APTBS signed to Mute Records. The band also announced another European tour and appearances at the Coachella Valley Music and Arts Festival, Seaport Music Festival and Siren Music Festival.

Their second album, Exploding Head, was released by Mute in October 2009.

In spring 2010, Smith decided to leave APTBS for personal reasons rather than participate in their US tour supporting the Big Pink. He was replaced for that spring tour by Lunadon, formerly of the bands the D4 and the True Lovers. On July 5, 2010, APTBS visited Bogotá, Colombia for the first time and played at Rock al Parque, the largest free rock festival in South America.

=== Worship ===
On February 14, 2011, Ackermann stated that the band had begun working on their third full-length album. On January 10, 2012, A Place to Bury Strangers released an all-Hipstamatic video shot on an iPhone for the song "So Far Away" from the Onwards to the Wall EP. On February 12, 2012, the band announced that Robi Gonzalez had replaced Weilmeister as drummer. On May 2, 2012, it was announced that the band's third album, Worship, was scheduled for release on the Dead Oceans label, on June 11 in the UK and Europe and on June 26, 2012, in the US. The band announced plans to support the release with a full North American tour in October 2012.

=== Strange Moon and Transfixiation ===
In early March 2013, APTBS announced that they had recorded covers of songs by Portland band Dead Moon for release on Record Store Day 2013 as an EP titled Strange Moon. Gonzalez decided to retire from touring and during the subsequent 2016 tour, John Fedowitz (Skywave, Ceremony) played drums for the band.

In March 2013, the band began recording their fourth studio album, Transfixiation. They recorded for several days at ABC Studios in Etne, Norway, with Emil Nikolaisen of Serena Maneesh. The album was released on February 17, 2015, on Dead Oceans.

=== Pinned, Hologram EP, and See Through You ===
In February 2018, the band announced that Lia Simone Braswell would be a permanent replacement for Gonzalez as the band's drummer. Their fifth studio album, Pinned, was released on April 13. After another lineup change in 2021 with John Fedowitz on bass and Sandra Fedowitz of Ceremony East Coast on drums, the new APTBS roster released the Hologram EP. On November 16, 2021, the band announced a new album, See Through You, which was released on February 4, 2022, with the "Let's See Each Other" single accompanying the announcement.

=== Synthesizer ===
In October 2024, A Place to Bury Strangers released their seventh album, Synthesizer. A music video for the song “You Got Me” was released in August 2024.

== Band members ==
Current members

- Oliver Ackermann - vocals, guitar, bass, drums (2003–present)
- Sandra Fedowitz - drums (2021–present)
- John Fedowitz - bass (2021–present), drums (2016)

Former members

- David Goffan - guitar (2002–2003)
- Tim Gregorio - vocals, bass (2002–2006)
- Justin Avery - drums (2003–2006)
- Jonathan "Jono Mofo" Smith - bass (2006–2010)
- Jason "Jay Space" Weilmeister - drums (2006–2012)
- Robi Gonzalez - drums, bass, guitar (2012–2016, 2016–2018)
- Dion Lunadon - vocals, guitar, bass, drums (2010–2020)
- Lia Simone Braswell - drums, vocals (2018–2020)

Touring members

- Robi Gonzalez - drums (2023 (one show only), 2024)
- Sarah Wilson - drums (2024)

Timeline

== Discography ==
=== Studio albums ===
- A Place to Bury Strangers (2007, Killer Pimp)
- Exploding Head (2009, Mute Records)
- Worship (2012, Dead Oceans)
- Transfixiation (2015, Dead Oceans)
- Pinned (2018, Dead Oceans)
- See Through You (2022, Dedstrange)
- Synthesizer (2024, Dedstrange)

=== EPs ===
- A Place to Bury Strangers 3-song CD/EP (2004, self-released)
- Breathe CD/EP (2006, self-released)
- Missing You (2006, self-released)
- A Place to Bury Strangers 6-song CD/EP
- Never Going Down (2006, self-released)
- The Box Set (2008, Vacancy Records)
- Hoxton Square Sessions (2009, Mute Records)
- Ego Death 2010 Tour EP (2010, Mute Records)
- I Lived My Life to Stand in the Shadow of Your Heart (2010, Mute Records)
- Onwards to the Wall (2012, Dead Oceans)
- Strange Moon (2013, Dead Oceans)
- Fuzz Club Sessions 12" EP (2019, Fuzz Club Records)
- Ice Cream Sucks 7" (2019, self-released)
- Hologram (2021, Dedstrange)

=== Compilations ===
- Rare Meat: Demos and Rarities 2003-2017 cassette (2017, self-released)/digital (2020, self-released)
- Rare and Deadly (2026, Dedstrange)

=== Singles ===
- "To Fix the Gash in Your Head" 10"/12" (2008, Meal Deal Records)
- "I Know I'll See You" 7" (2008, Rocket Girl/Vacancy Records)
- "Breathe" 7" (2008, Vacancy Records)
- "Missing You" 7" (2008, Rocket Girl/Vacancy Records)
- "In Your Heart" 7" (2009, Mute Records)
- "Keep Slipping Away" 7" (2009, Mute Records)
- "You Are the One" 7" (2012, Dead Oceans)
- "And I'm Up" 7" (2012, Dead Oceans)
- Less Artists More Condos Series #1 split single with Ceremony (2012, Famous Class)
- "Raiser" 7" (2013, Sweet Mistakes Productions)
- "Petty Empire" 7" (2015, Dead Oceans)
- "We've Come So Far" 7" (2015, self-released)
- "Straight" 7" (2015, self-released)
- "Never Coming Back" (2018, Dead Oceans)
- "There's Only One of Us" (2018, Dead Oceans)
- "Frustrated Operator" (2018, Dead Oceans)
- "End of the Night" (2021, Dedstrange)
- "I Might Have" (2021, Dedstrange)
- "I Need You" (2021, Dedstrange)
- "Let's See Each Other" (2021, Dedstrange)
- "Hold on Tight" (2021, Dedstrange)
- "I'm Hurt" (2022, Dedstrange)
- "Always Gonna Be the Same" with Podsongs (2023, The Independent Record Company)

=== Live albums ===
- Loud and Live in 2012 (2013, self-released)

=== Remix albums ===
- Re-Pinned (2018, Dead Oceans)
