= Tony Mott =

Australian rock music photographer (born 1956)

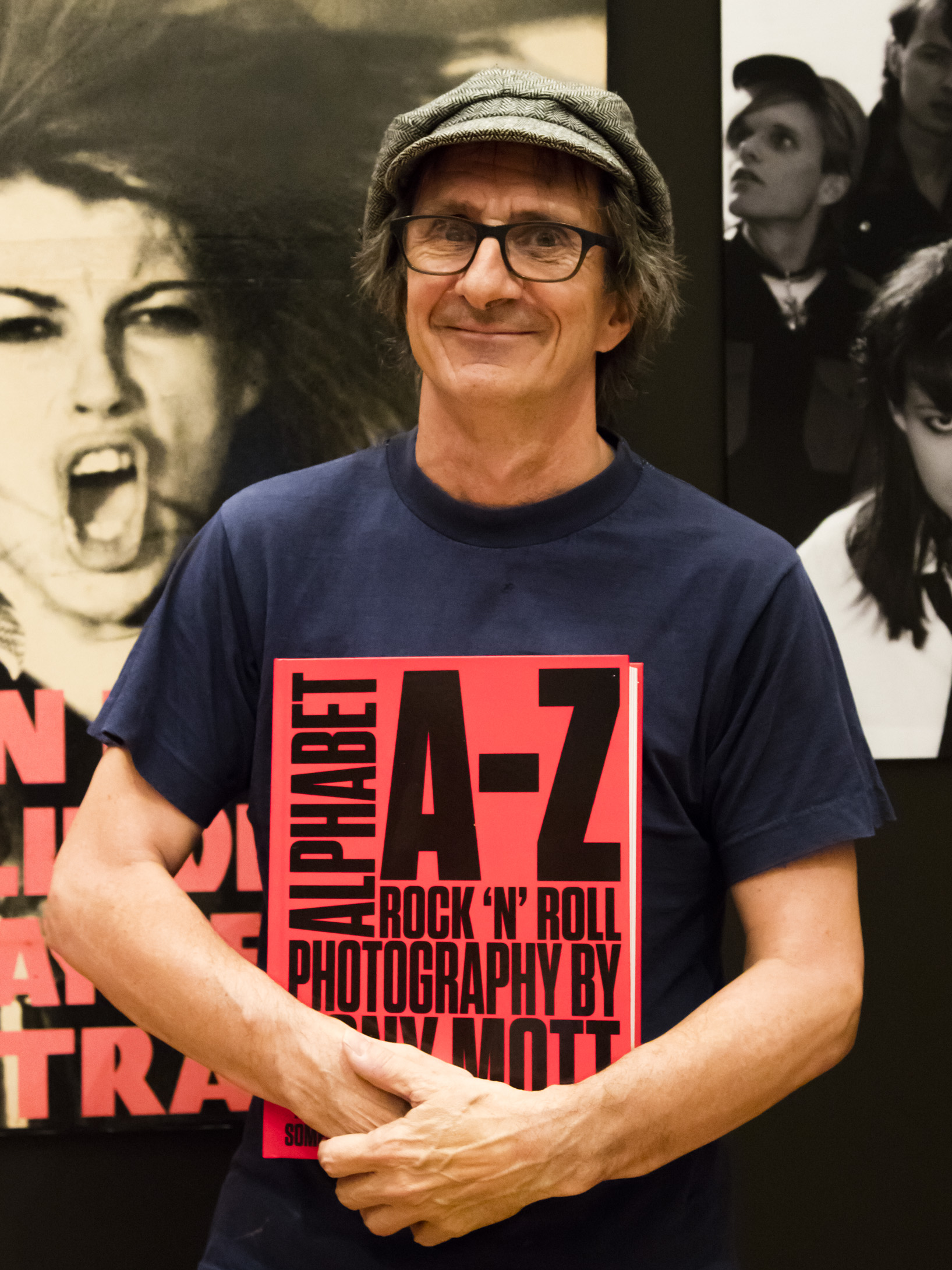
- Mott in 2015
- Born: April 1956 (age 70); Sheffield, England
- Occupation: Photographer
- Known for: Australia's premier Rock 'n' Roll photographer; Official photographer for "Big Day Out" music festival
- Spouse: Libby Sharpe (m. 2008)
- Children: 2

Tony Mott (born Anthony Moulds, April 1956) is an English-born Australian rock and music photographer. In a career spanning more than 30 years, his photographs have appeared in local and international magazines, newspapers, and album covers. Mott is recognised as Australia's premier rock photographer and a leading worldwide exponent of the craft.

== Early life ==
Mott was born Anthony Moulds in April 1956, child of Brian and Mary Moulds, and raised in Sheffield, England. He was a student at Jordanthorpre Comprehensive secondary school, and trained as a chef at Sheffield Polytechnic before arriving in Australia in 1976.

== Chef's career ==
Mott trained as a French and pastry chef and spent 10 years working in hotels in the United Kingdom and in Australia.

He worked for six months as a chef in Sydney at the Opera House and at the Gazebo Hotel in Kings Cross in 1976, before helping establish a restaurant in Armidale, New South Wales. Mott then returned to England because of a limited working visa.

Mott then worked as a chef aboard the cruise ship SS Oriana for two years, visiting more than 60 countries and developing an interest in travel and photography. Returning to Sydney, he decided to settle in Australia permanently in 1981. Whilst resuming work as a chef at the Gazebo Hotel in Kings Cross, Mott pursued his love of music, exploring Sydney's live music scene in the evenings.

== Photography career ==
Mott's interest in photography began in Sheffield, where he learnt basic black-and-white developing skills and explored an interest in social documentary photography whilst working as a chef. Pennie Smith, a London-based photographer who worked for music magazine NME, was an early influence.

=== Sydney's live music scene ===
Mott's career as a rock photographer began in 1983 at the Piccadilly Hotel in Kings Cross. Mott went to see the Sydney band the Divinyls on Monday nights at the hotel and began photographing the band's lead singer Chrissy Amphlett. Band manager Vince Lovegrove chose one of Mott's photographs as a tour poster and from 1983 bands began approaching Mott to shoot their gigs. Mott went on to document the Sydney music scene of the 1980s and 1990s when the city and suburbs were full of live venues and had a flourishing record industry.

=== Street press and magazines ===
Shortly after his first break with the Divinyls, Mott found work through the free Sydney paper On the Street, working closely with editor Margaret Cott, later publisher of Drum Media. Mott was given a free rein to develop his skills as a rock 'n roll photographer with many bands. His photographs began to appear in mainstream music magazines Juice, Drum Media, RAM, Juke, Creem, and Rolling Stone.

Mott's success is reflected in the number of magazine covers featuring his photographs. Since his first cover for the German issue of Rolling Stone magazine in the early 1990s, his work has been featured on the cover of Rolling Stone 14 times. His photographs have appeared on an estimated 900 magazine front covers.

At the height of Mott's career he was estimated to have 172 music magazines on his books, and could sell one concert photograph to 30 magazines at a time. Today 162 of those magazine titles no longer exist. These trends mirror changes in the record industry, which in Sydney had 12 major labels in the early 1980s, down to about three in 2015. The shrinking magazine market has seen Mott's income from this source shrink to an estimated 10%, with 10% from record companies, and the rest from band commissions.

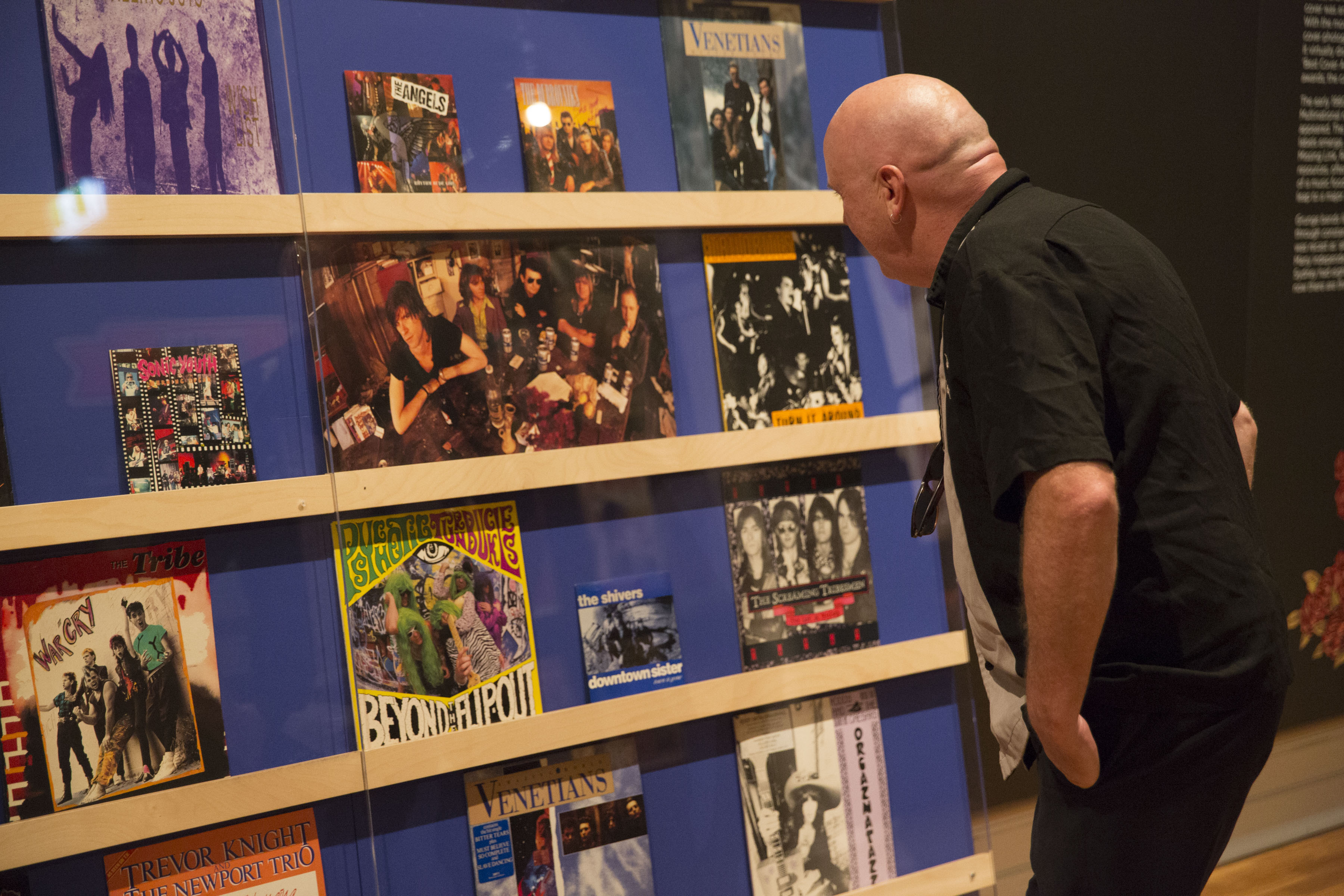
Album covers on display. Exhibition: "What a Life!" State Library of NSW

From the 1990s Mott's photographs were also featured on album covers. Notable early covers included Tommy Emmanuel's Dare to Be Different and the Beasts of Bourbon's Black Milk.

=== International music scene ===
Mott's first international portrait featured the Eurythmics. Then in 1988 Mick Jagger was touring Australia to promote his first solo album and Mott was hired as Jagger's tour photographer. This subsequently led to Mott being hired by the Rolling Stones and touring with them on three occasions. In the same year that Mott was hired by Jagger, he toured with Bob Dylan and Fleetwood Mac, establishing an international reputation. Mott has photographed a large number of the international acts to have visited Australia.

Mott's portfolio includes the most popular names in music, including the Rolling Stones, Paul McCartney, David Bowie, Elton John, Nirvana, and Madonna, along with major Australian acts INXS, Cold Chisel, Midnight Oil, Silverchair, and the independent Sydney band scene.

Mott's portraits have become the best known images of many musicians and bands; examples include Chrissy Amplett of the Divinyls at the Piccadilly Hotel, Kings Cross, 1983; the classic shot of Peter Garrett at the Sydney Entertainment Centre in 1985; the much published portrait of Icelandic singer Björk at the Big Day Out, 1994; the defining shot of Sex Pistols singer Johnny Rotten (Lydon) at the Hordern Pavilion, Sydney, 1994; and the dynamic portraits of Kylie Minogue and Nick Cave who sang the duet "Where the Wild Roses Grow", 1996.

=== Music festivals ===
Music festivals were another fertile source of photographs for Mott from the late 1980s. Initially he visited the summer festivals in Europe and the United States. Milton Keynes, Reading, and Glastonbury were among the popular UK festivals.

A major breakthrough for Mott came in 1992 with the establishment of Australia's first Rock 'n Roll Festival, the Big Day Out. Each year Mott went on the road as the Festival toured Australia. Developing relationships with the bands he shot, he became the festival's official photographer.

=== Digital photography ===
The advent of digital technology has seen a decline in the demand for rock 'n roll photographs as fans at venues have their own digital cameras and mobile phones. Mott sold 28 images internationally of band Red Hot Chili Peppers when he photographed them in 2000, compared to selling only three images in 2013. Mott finally switched to a digital camera in 2008 after Nikon presented him with a D3 camera. After using it at a Judas Priest concert, he discovered it was well suited to live music, achieving dozens of good images, where film may have produced only a few.

=== Film ===
Mott's introduction to film came as a stills photographer with Paul Goldman's feature film Suburban Mayhem (2007). A number of films have followed:

- Cactus (2008)
- Animal Kingdom (2010)
- Tomorrow When the War Began (2010)
- A Few Best Men (2011)
- The Darkside (2013)
- The Rover (2014)

As of 2015 a large percentage of Mott's income comes from stills on television and film productions. This has coincided with the advent of digital photography and other changes in the music industry including a decline in live music and drop in music magazine production.

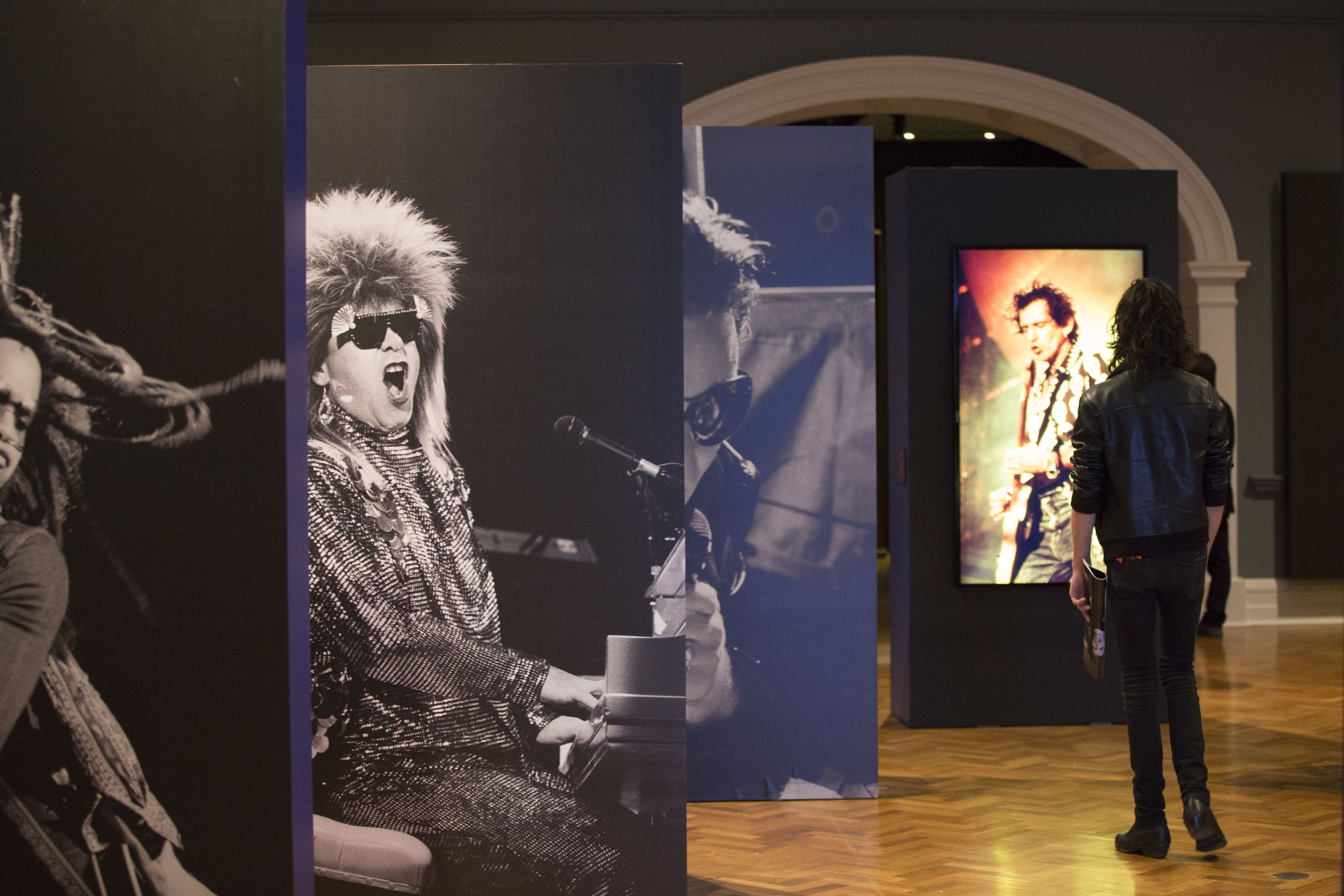
Exhibition: "What a Life! Rock Photography by Tony Mott"

=== Exhibitions ===
- Rock Exposure (25 May – 24 June 1984), Music Gallery, Woolloomooloo. A collaboration with rock photographers Bob King, Ian Greene and Tom Takacs. Mott's photographs featured a selection of women in rock including the Eurythmics, the Belle Stars, Kim Wilde, Joan Jett and the Divinyls.
- Still Noise: Australian Rock Photography (1991), National touring exhibition. Coinciding with the release of book by the same title.
- Rock & Roll is the new trainspotting (2010), Sydney, Melbourne, and Brisbane galleries. Mott's first solo exhibition. A 30 year retrospective coinciding with the release of his book: Rock & Roll is the new trainspotting.
- I Touch Myself (April – May 2014), Blender Gallery Paddington with NSW Cancer Council. Portraits honouring the life of Divinyls frontwoman, Chrissy Amphlett.
- What a Life! Rock Photography By Tony Mott (17 October 2015 – 7 February 2016), State Library of New South Wales. A 30 year retrospective showcasing a lifetime of work, combined with related ephemera from the Library's collection.

=== Photographic output ===
Mott has published more than 30,000 photographs in 20 countries, including 900 magazine front covers. His output is the result of 3,000 sessions and innumerable live shows that have translated into 400 posters, 500 CD or vinyl covers (singles, EPs and albums), featuring some of the world's greatest musicians.

In an interview with Guardian Australia in 2021, Mott described a large personal archive of unseen photographs that haven't been published. Spanning over 40 years, Mott has been able to assess and share photos that he would have "disregarded years ago" with the improvements in digital technology.

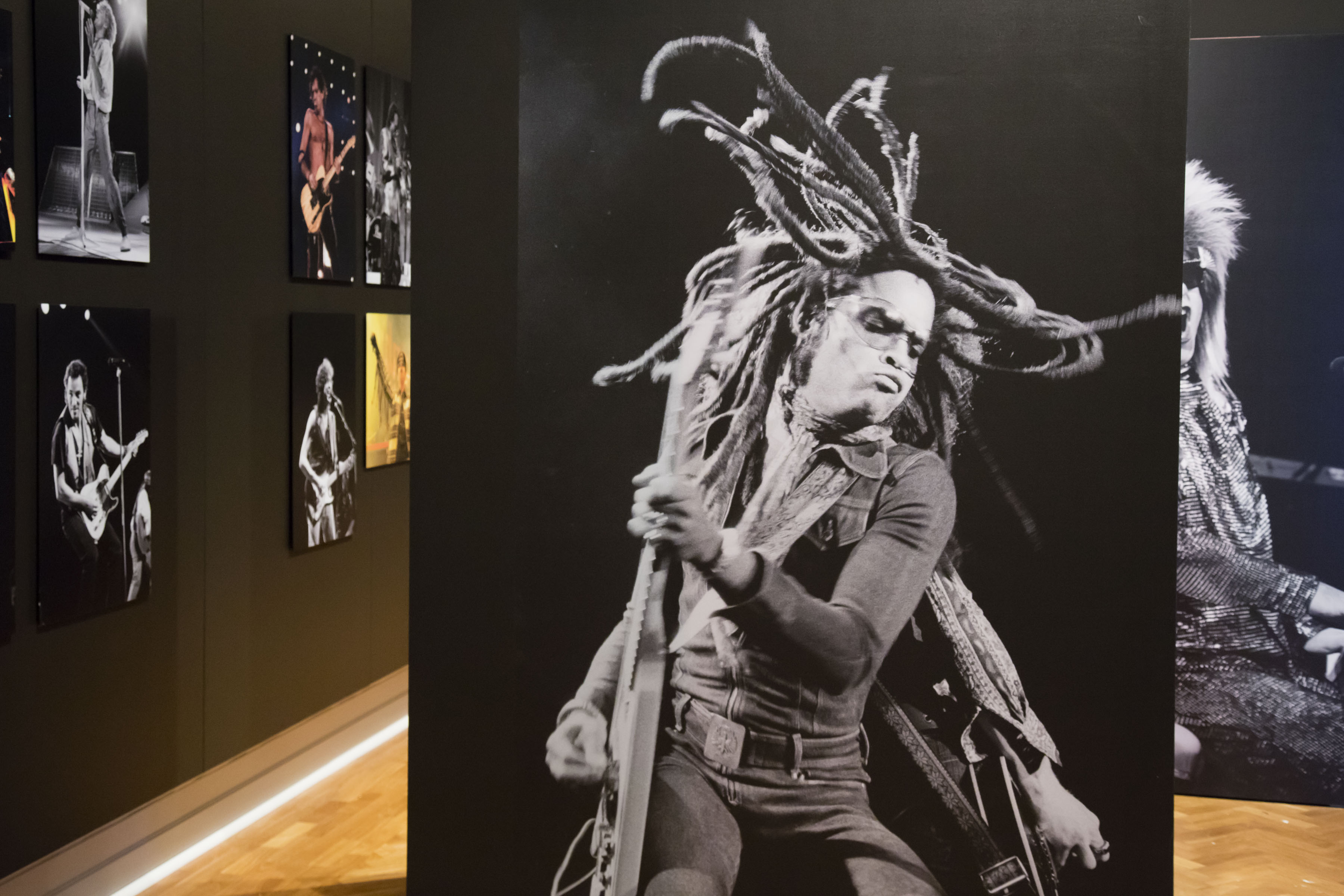
Exhibition: "What a Life! Rock Photography by Tony Mott"

== List of works ==
=== Published books ===
Mott's photographs have appeared in numerous published works. Mott has collaborated in and published a number of books featuring his photographs, often coinciding with exhibitions of work. These include:

- Still Noise: Australian Rock photography (1991). A collaboration with four other rock n roll photographers: Bob King, Chrystene Carroll, Wendy McDougall and Adrienne Overall. Released to coincide with a national touring exhibition.
- Every Picture Tells a Story (2003). A Large format compilation of Mott's favourite and best known shots, a retrospective from a 20 year career.
- Rock Chicks: The hottest female rockers from the 1960s to now (2010). Collaboration with author Alison Stieven-Taylor profiling rock 'n' roll women from the 1960s onwards, from Janis Joplin, Suzi Quattro and Chrissie Hynde to Courtney Love and Pink.
- Rock 'n Roll Photography is the New Trainspotting (2011). A retrospective of Tony Mott's work from the last 30 years.
- Alphabet A-Z Rock 'n' Roll Photography by Tony Mott: Some rock, some roll, some other things! (2015). A retrospective of Tony Mott's work from the last 30 years coinciding with the State Library of NSW exhibition: What a Life! Rock Photography By Tony Mott"(17 October 2015 – 7 February 2016).

=== Films ===
Year	Title	Role
2004	Sarah McLachlan: Afterglow Live	Live photography
2010	Animal Kingdom	Still photographer
2010	Tomorrow, When the War Began	Still photographer
2011	A Few Best Men	Still photographer
2014	The Rover	Still photographer
2016	Lion	Stills photography
2019	I Am Woman	Still photographer

=== Television and Mini Series ===
Mott's work on television and mini series' in Australia has largely been as a stills photographer. However, he did appear in the episode Snowy Pizza (Season 1, Episode 8) of the TV series Pizza in a cameo role.

==== As Still Photographer ====
Year	Title	No. of episodes
2014	Love Child	
2015	Peter Allen: Not the Boy Next Door	2 episodes
2015	The Principal	4 episodes
2016	Wanted	
2016	Brock	2 episodes
2016	Doctor Doctor	
2016	The Secret Daughter	12 episodes
2017	Janet King	8 episodes
2017	Blue Murder: Killer Cop	2 episodes
2017	Friday on My Mind	1 episode
2018	Sando	6 episodes
2018	Rake	8 episodes
2018	On the Ropes	4 episodes
2019	Secret City	5 episodes
2019	The Letdown	6 episodes
2019	The Unlisted	3 episodes
2019	Les Norton	
2019	Diary of an Uber Driver	6 episodes
2019	The Commons	
2020	The End	10 episodes
2021	Amazing Graze	3 episodes
2022	Underbelly: Vanishing Act	2 episodes

== Awards ==
- 1991 Australian Music Industry Awards: Best Rock Photographer
- 1992 Australian Music Industry Awards: Best Rock Photographer
- 2001 Australian Music Week: Best Live Concert Photography
- 2002 Australian Live Music Award: Best Live Concert Photography
- 2003 Australian Live Music Award: Best Live Concert Photography
- 2005 Jack Rock Photographer of the Year
- 2006 Jack Rock Photographer of the Year

== Personal life ==
Mott changed his name from Anthony Moulds to Tony Mott after receiving his first photo credit. Mott is named after the most influential band in his life, Mott The Hoople.

In 2006 whilst employed as stills photographer on the feature film Suburban Mayhem, he met production manager Libby Sharpe, whom he married in 2008. They have two children, twins Harvey and Lucinda, born in 2011.

== See also ==
- Big Day Out
- Jack Awards
- Mott the Hoople
- Pennie Smith
- Who Shot Rock & Roll
