= Juke Magazine =

Australian music magazine

Juke Magazine was a weekly Australian rock and pop newspaper published in Melbourne that ran from 1975 to 1992.

== Background and description ==
Juke Magazine was founded in 1975 by Ed Nimmervoll (former editor of Go-Set magazine) who was the editor and one of its writers.

Along with Nimmervoll, Juke also featured Australian music journalist Christie Eliezer as a key staff writer and rock photographers such as Graeme Webber, Bob King, Tony Mott and David Parker. It was one of two main music newspapers at the time offering a Melbourne-based perspective of the music industry.

It was highly regarded by the music industry along with its main competitor Rock Australia Magazine (aka RAM) which offered a more Sydney-based perspective and coverage of the Australian music industry at the time.

A key and popular feature of Juke Magazine was its extensive gig guide (particularly of Melbourne's music scene), which attracted a lot of attention by bands, booking agencies and venues. Over time Juke took a more national focus as a music newspaper and the gig guide also evolved to cover more of a national perspective of gigs across Australia.

== Archive ==
Juke Magazine, which ceased publication after 1992, is archived with the Australian Performing Arts Collection to preserve its important legacy to the history of Australian music and impact on Australian popular culture. It was donated in 1995 and includes photographs, press releases, correspondence, and advertising material from the magazines archive. The collection was digitised in 2023 for researchers. Select articles from Juke are available on Rock's Backpages.
