= Big Day Out 04 =

Compilation album by Various Artists
- Released: 8 December 2003
- Label: Universal Music

Various Artists chronology
Big Day Out 03 (2003)	Big Day Out 04 (2003)	Big Day Out 05 (2005)

Big Day Out 04 is a 2003 New Zealand compilation album, published by Universal Music Australia, to coincide with the Big Day Out music festival in 2004.

== Track listing ==
=== Disc one ===
1. "53rd & 3rd" - Metallica
2. "This Apparatus Must Be Unleashed" - The Mars Volta
3. "Are You Gonna Be My Girl" - Jet
4. "You Were The Last High" - The Dandy Warhols
5. "White Night" - Hoodoo Gurus
6. "Get Activated" - Gerling
7. "MF from Hell" - The Datsuns
8. "Signals Over the Air" - Thursday
9. "Déjà Vu" - Something for Kate
10. "In Your Arms" - Skulker
11. "Red Morning Light" - Kings of Leon
12. "Burn Burn" - Lostprophets
13. "Apathy is a Cold Body" - Poison the Well
14. "Watch Out Boys" - Magic Dirt
15. "One Second of Insanity" - The Butterfly Effect
16. "Real Life" - Cog
17. "Sophie" - Goodshirt
18. "Vampire Racecourse" - The Sleepy Jackson
19. "Growing On Me" - The Darkness

=== Disc two ===
1. "Come to Daddy" - Aphex Twin
2. "Stockholm Syndrome" - Muse
3. "Hands Up" - The Black Eyed Peas
4. "El Questro" - Downsyde
5. "Again" - Pnau
6. "Supercide" - Trey
7. "The Things" - Audio Bullys
8. "Kick It" - Peaches
9. "Where Ur At" - 1200 Techniques
10. "Lucky Star" - Basement Jaxx
11. "Silver Screen Shower Scene" - Afrika Bambaataa and Soulsonic Force
12. "Freaky Highway" - sonicanimation
13. "U Can't Resist Us" - King Kapisi & Che Fu
14. "Stand Up" - Scribe
15. "Sneaker Sex" - Friendly vs. Toby Neal
16. "Heaven or Hell?" - Peewee Ferris
17. "Slide" - Salmonella Dub
18. "Do You Realize??" - The Flaming Lips
