= Big Day Out 03 =

Compilation album by Various Artists
- Released: 2002
- Label: Universal Music

Various Artists chronology
Big Day Out 03 (2002)	Big Day Out 04 (2004)

Big Day Out 03 is a 2002 Australian compilation album, published by Warner Music Australia, to coincide with the Big Day Out music festival in 2003.

== Track listing ==
=== Disc one ===
1. The One - Foo Fighters
2. This Wicked Tongue - PJ Harvey
3. Get Free - The Vines
4. Cut Your Ribbon - Sparta
5. What Would You Do - The Living End
6. Set It Off - Resin Dogs
7. Karma - 1200 Techniques
8. Multiply - Xzibit
9. Take Me To Broadway - Gonzales
10. Bucket Bong - Frenzal Rhomb
11. Bleed American (live) - Jimmy Eat World
12. Man or Mouse - Millencolin
13. The People - The Music
14. Pussy Town - Machine Gun Fellatio
15. La La Land (Poxy Music v Kid Kenobi Remix) - Green Velvet
16. The Robots - Kraftwerk

=== Disc two ===
1. Two Months Off - Underworld
2. No One Knows - Queens of the Stone Age
3. In Love - The Datsuns
4. Nosebleed - The Hard Ons
5. Dead In Hollywood - Murderdolls
6. Change (In The House of Flies) - Deftones
7. Nil By Mouth - Blindspott
8. Fashion Rules! - Chicks on Speed
9. Rising Sun - Bexta
10. Stars and Heroes - Luke Slater
11. One Robot - Rocket Science
12. This Train Will Be Taking No Passengers - Augie March
13. Heavy Metal Drummer - Wilco
14. Lucky - Waikiki
15. N.D.C. - Jebediah
16. Bulletproof - Pacifier
17. What's The Deal? - 28 Days
18. London Still - The Waifs
19. Jane Says - Jane's Addiction
