= Out of My Head (album) =

Studio album by the D4
- Released: 25 February 2005
- Label: Flying Nun Records

The D4 chronology
6twenty (2001)	Out of My Head (2005)

Out of My Head is the second studio album released by New Zealand rock band the D4 in 2005. A two-disc limited-edition version of the album was also released the same year.

== Track listing ==
=== Original release ===
1. "Sake Bomb (English Version)"
2. "Out of My Head"
3. "Feel It Like It"
4. "What I Want"
5. "Trust Nobody"
6. "Stops Me Cold"
7. "Omertà"
8. "Out of Control"
9. "Too Stupid"
10. "Do No Right"
11. "Peepshow"
12. "Savage"

=== Limited Edition release ===
==== Disc one ====
1. "Sake Bomb (English Version)"
2. "Out of My Head"
3. "Feel It Like It"
4. "What I Want"
5. "Trust Nobody"
6. "Stops Me Cold"
7. "Omertà"
8. "Out of Control"
9. "Too Stupid"
10. "Do No Right"
11. "Peepshow"
12. "Savage"

==== Bonus disc ====
1. "Sake Bomb (Japanese Version)"
2. "Rock 'n' Rule"
3. "Diamond, Ruby, Stone"

=== 20th Anniversary Edition release ===
1. "Sake Bomb (English Version)"
2. "Out of My Head"
3. "Feel It Like It"
4. "What I Want"
5. "Trust Nobody"
6. "Stops Me Cold"
7. "Omertà"
8. "Out of Control"
9. "Too Stupid"
10. "Do No Right"
11. "Peepshow"
12. "Savage"
13. "Judgement Day"
14. "Boots"
15. "What I Want (Live in New Plymouth)"
16. "No Antidote"
17. "Diamond, Ruby Stone"
18. "Action Woman"
19. "Omertà (Demo Version)"
20. "Peepshow (Demo Version)"
21. "Sake Bomb (Japanese Vocals)"

== Charts ==
Out of My Head spent 3 weeks on the New Zealand album chart, peaking at number 17 in March 2005.
