= 6twenty =

Studio album by The D4
- Released: October 26, 2001
- Genres: Garage rock, garage punk
- Length: 39:29
- Label: Flying Nun Records
- Producer: The D4, Bob Frisbee

The D4 chronology
The D4 (2000)	6twenty (2001)	Out of My Head (2005)

Singles from 6twenty
- 1. "Rock'n'Roll Motherfucker" Released: 2002; 2. "Party" Released: 2002; 3. "Come On!" Released: 2002; 4. "Get Loose" Released: 2002; 5. "Ladies Man" Released: 2003; 6. "Exit to the City" Released: 2003

Professional ratings
Review scores
Source	Rating
AllMusic	3/5 stars
Pitchfork	2.8/10
Drowned in Sound	7/10
PopMatters	–

6twenty is the debut album released by New Zealand rock band The D4 in 2001. A limited edition vinyl version was released in 2002.

== Track listing ==
- All songs written by the D4, except where noted.

Original 2001 release

1. "Rock'n'Roll Motherfucker" 2:00
2. "Party" 2:39
3. "Come On!" 2:23
4. "Pirate Love" (Johnny Thunders) 3:39
5. "Running On Empty" 3:12
6. "Ladies Man" 3:47
7. "Invader Ace" (Guitar Wolf) 2:46
8. "Little Baby" 3:08
9. "Rebekah" 3:37
10. "Mysterex" (The Scavengers) 3:56
11. "Exit To The City" 3:40
12. "Heartbreaker" 4:28

2002 Limited Vinyl release

1. "Rock'n'Roll Motherfucker|RocknRoll Motherf**ker"
2. "Party"
3. "Come On!"
4. "Pirate Love"
5. "Running On Empty"
6. "Ladies Man"
7. "Invader Ace"
8. "Heartbreaker"
9. "Get Loose"
10. "Little Baby"
11. "Rebekah"
12. "Mysterex"
13. "Exit To The City"

2003 US release

1. "Rock'n'Roll Motherfucker" (Abbreviated "RnR MF" on the back cover)
2. "Get Loose"
3. "Party"
4. "Come On!"
5. "Invader Ace"
6. "Exit To The City"
7. "Heartbreaker"
8. "Running On Empty"
9. "Ladies Man"
10. "Pirate Love"
11. "Little Baby"
12. "Rebekah"
13. "Mysterex"
14. "Outta Blues"

(Also includes enhanced CD extras, such as the video for "Get Loose")

== Personnel ==
- Dion Palmer - Vocals, Guitars
- Jimmy Christmas - Vocals, Guitars
- Vaughan Williams - Bass
- Rich Mixture - Drums
- Cameron Rowe - Organ

== Production ==
- Produced By The D4 & Bob Frisbee
- Engineered By Andrew Buckton, Bob Frisbee & Malcolm Welsford
