= Worship (A Place to Bury Strangers album) =

Studio album by A Place to Bury Strangers
- Released: June 26, 2012
- Recorded: 2011–2012
- Studios: Death by Audio, Brooklyn, New York
- Genres: Noise rock, shoegaze, space rock
- Length: 44:32
- Label: Dead Oceans
- Producer: A Place to Bury Strangers

A Place to Bury Strangers chronology
| Exploding Head (2009) | Worship (2012) | Strange Moon (2013) |

Professional ratings
Aggregate scores
| Source | Rating |
|---|---|
| Metacritic | 69/100 |
Review scores
| Source | Rating |
| AllMusic | 4/5 stars |
| The A.V. Club | B− |
| Robert Christgau | A− |
| Drowned in Sound | 6/10 |
| Pitchfork | 6.5/10 |

Worship is the third album from the noise rock band A Place to Bury Strangers. It is their first album for their new label Dead Oceans. "You Are the One" was released as a free download on April 2, 2012.

The track listing has been confirmed on the label's site.

== Track listing ==
| No. | Title | Length |
|---|---|---|
| 1. | "Alone" | 2:28 |
| 2. | "You Are the One" | 4:03 |
| 3. | "Mind Control" | 3:15 |
| 4. | "Worship" | 3:54 |
| 5. | "Fear" | 4:51 |
| 6. | "Dissolved" | 5:29 |
| 7. | "Why I Can't Cry Anymore" | 3:41 |
| 8. | "Revenge" | 5:07 |
| 9. | "And I'm Up" | 3:48 |
| 10. | "Slide" | 3:48 |
| 11. | "Leaving Tomorrow" | 4:07 |

== Charts ==
| Chart (2012) | Peak position |
|---|---|
| US Heatseekers Albums (Billboard) | 11 |
| US Vinyl Albums (Billboard) | 4 |
