= Ken West =

Australian music promoter (1958–2022)

- Born: 5 February 1958; Sydney, Australia
- Died: 7 April 2022 (aged 64)
- Known for: Big Day Out

Ken West (5 February 1958 – 7 April 2022) was an Australian music promoter and founder of the Big Day Out music festival.

== Career ==
Born in Sydney, Australia, Ken West grew up in Cabramatta and studied at what is now UNSW College of Fine Arts in 1976 to become a kineticist and experiential artist. During the 1980s he worked as promoter, tour manager, and artist manager for Nick Cave, Laughing Clowns, I'm Talking, and Beasts of Bourbon. He promoted Australian tours for New Order, Lou Reed, Run-DMC, before starting the Big Day Out festival in 1992.

The Big Day Out was founded by West and Vivian Lees. The first festival in 1992 was only held in Sydney, but subsequent years expanded around Australia, and later also included New Zealand.

After it was reported West had left the festival in 2013, the final Big Day Out was held in 2014 after the cancellation of 2015's planned festival.

Following the festival, West kept a low profile until the beginning of 2022 when he announced he had written a book titled Controlled Chaos. The announcement coincided with the 30th anniversary of Big Day Out, and West released chapters from the book relating to the festival. He said he'd begun writing in 2002, and planned to release an ebook by the end of the year. Chapters 20–27 were published online on his new website Kenfest, with plans to publish further updates across the year.

In April, West's family announced he had died at the age of 64 on 7 April 2022.
