= Exploding Head =

Studio album by A Place to Bury Strangers
- Released: 6 October 2009
- Recorded: 2008–2009
- Studios: Death By Audio, Brooklyn, New York
- Genres: Noise rock, shoegaze, post-punk revival
- Length: 43:02
- Label: Mute
- Producer: Andy Smith

A Place to Bury Strangers chronology
A Place to Bury Strangers (2007)	Exploding Head (2009)	Worship (2012)

Exploding Head is the second album from the noise rock band A Place to Bury Strangers. It is their first release on a major label and the first album for their new label Mute Records. "In Your Heart" was released as the first single and "Keep Slipping Away" was released as a single on Monday 7 December 2009 in the UK.

== Critical reception ==
Professional ratings
Aggregate scores
Source	Rating
Metacritic	79/100
Review scores
Source	Rating
AllMusic	link
AltSounds	(93%)
BBC	(favourable) link
CHARTattack	link
Drowned in Sound	(9/10) link
Pitchfork	(6.6/10) link
PopMatters	(7/10) link
Rock Sound	(9/10)
Spin	link
Tiny Mix Tapes	link

The album was a critical success and on Metacritic received a score of 79 out of 100, based on reviews from 16 critics.

== Track listing ==
No.	Title	Length
1.	"It Is Nothing"	3:08
2.	"In Your Heart"	3:10
3.	"Lost Feeling"	5:13
4.	"Deadbeat"	3:32
5.	"Keep Slipping Away"	4:35
6.	"Ego Death"	5:42
7.	"Smile When You Smile"	4:51
8.	"Everything Always Goes Wrong"	3:40
9.	"Exploding Head"	3:33
10.	"I Lived My Life to Stand in the Shadow of Your Heart"	5:38

=== Japan bonus tracks ===
No.	Title	Length
11.	"It's a Fast Driving Rave-Up with a Place to Bury Strangers"	4:24
12.	"Alive"	2:29
13.	"Hit the Ground"	4:29
14.	"Strictly Looks"	4:14
15.	"You Still Love Me"	2:37
16.	"Keep Slipping Away" (South Central Remix)	4:40
