= Magnet House (building) =

Heritage building and entertainment complex in Perth, Western Australia

- British General Electric Co. Building
- Interactive map of the Magnet House area

General information
- Location: Perth, Western Australia, 393 Murray Street
- Coordinates: 31°57′08″S 115°51′11″E
- Current tenants: Magnet House (website); Amplifier Bar (website)
- Construction started: 1935
- Completed: 14 September 1936

Design and construction
- Architects: Hobbs, Forbes & Partners

Magnet House, located at 393 Murray Street, Perth, is a heritage-listed commercial building operating as an entertainment complex. Constructed in 1936 as an industrial showroom, the site was converted into a licensed venue in 1973. The interior has been modified over time to house several distinct nightclubs and live performance spaces, including The Peppermint Cloud, Pinocchio's, The Globe Nightclub, The Monkey Bar, Capitol, and Amplifier Bar.

== History ==
=== Commercial Use (1936–1972) ===
During the early decades of the twentieth century, the western end of Murray Street near Shafto Lane was primarily occupied by automotive workshops and industrial yards. In 1935, the British General Electric Company (BGE) acquired the site and commissioned Perth architectural firm Hobbs, Forbes & Partners to design a state headquarters, warehouse, and retail showroom.

The building officially opened on 14 September 1936, in a ceremony officiated by Lieutenant-Governor Sir James Mitchell. Named "Magnet House" after BGE's consumer appliance brand, the building featured a moulded concrete parapet and a vertical neon sign reading "BGE". The company operated its trade depot and showroom from the premises until vacating the inner-city site in the late 1960s.

=== Conversion to Licensed Venue (1973–1995) ===
In 1972, the building was structurally modified to convert the showroom floor into a licensed venue. It opened the following year as The Peppermint Cloud Night Club. Alterations included the construction of a masonry front wall and an arched brick entranceway that obscured the interior from the street.

By late 1979, the site was refitted and rebranded as Pinocchio’s Night Club. Operating through the 1980s and early 1990s, the venue programmed commercial pop and Top 40 music. During this period, the internal floor plan was segmented into distinct bars and split levels to manage patron capacity.

=== Underground Electronic Layout (1996–2003) ===
In 1996, the interior was renovated to remove the 1980s fit-out, exposing the raw concrete, steel, and brick surfaces. The building was partitioned into two separately programmed spaces operating under a single liquor license:

- The Globe Nightclub: A double-height room located in the central core of the building. The layout featured a ground-floor dancefloor surrounded on three sides by an elevated mezzanine balcony. It hosted electronic music events, focusing on breakbeat, drum and bass, techno, and progressive house.
- The Monkey Bar: A smaller, low-ceilinged room established at the rear and side of the main room footprint. It operated with independent bar counters and focused on genres including deep house, UK garage, tech-house, and hip-hop.

=== Live Music Refit: Capitol and Amplifier (2003–2020) ===
The property underwent a multi-million-dollar redevelopment in mid-2003 to shift toward live music and alternative rock events. The venue was divided into two distinct but linked spaces:

- Capitol: The central room previously occupied by The Globe was refitted with acoustic panels, an expanded performance stage, and reinforced mezzanine sightlines. It operated as a mid-sized concert venue for international touring acts, including The Strokes, Arcade Fire, and Tame Impala, while maintaining club nights on weekends.
- Amplifier Bar: Constructed in the side courtyard and rear footprint previously occupied by The Monkey Bar. Built as an open-air courtyard with an adjacent indoor band room, it programmed local punk, metal, and heavy rock acts.

While both venues operated independently on standard weekends, internal doors were opened during holiday long weekends and multi-stage festivals to combine Capitol and Amplifier into a single complex. A bowling alley extension was added to the Amplifier Bar section of the complex in 2019.

=== Modernization and Magnet House Relaunch (2020–present) ===
On 1 January 2020, the Capitol room closed for internal demolition and structural modernization, while the adjacent Amplifier Bar remained open.

The main room reopened in late 2020, reclaiming the building's original 1936 title, Magnet House. The multi-million dollar transformation of the 545 m² interior footprint was executed by principal design firm BHO Interiors alongside Chindarsi Architects and Technical Alliance. The redesign stripped the venue to its structural shell and removed the traditional concert-hall stage framing to establish a multi-tiered dance venue.

BHO Interiors reconfigured the internal zoning to optimize crowd flow, installing two elongated high-volume main bars on the ground floor, a third bar on the upper level, and an expansive suite of custom VIP lounge booths. The first floor was modified to incorporate an independent, throwback-themed "Retro Room" featuring its own dedicated bar footprint. To blend the interior surfaces with the venue's intense lighting, the bars were constructed using translucent Corian solid surfaces custom-engineered with seamless cabinetry, allowing continuous, shadowless linear lighting tracks to run uninterrupted from the ceiling, down the walls, and straight through the bar counters. This structural design operated in tandem with a 54-piece tessellating kinetic ceiling system suspended over the main dancefloor, utilizing variable-speed motors to generate dynamic geometric lighting configurations.

== Architecture ==
Magnet House is an Inter-War Functionalist commercial building constructed in 1936, characterised by restrained geometric styling and an emphasis on vertical composition.

The façade is rendered and organised into a series of vertical bays, with stylised detailing and decorative ventilation grilles reflecting the influence of modernist design trends of the period. The building’s narrow street frontage and vertical emphasis are typical of commercial developments in Perth’s central business district during the inter-war economic expansion.

A notable feature of the building is the relief sculpture of a horseshoe magnet located at parapet level, referencing the original occupant, the British General Electric Company. The magnet motif functions as both ornamentation and corporate branding, reinforcing the building’s original commercial identity.

Alterations over time have included changes to the ground-floor frontage associated with its later use as a hospitality and entertainment venue. Despite these modifications, the upper façade retains a high degree of integrity as an example of 1930s commercial Inter-War Functionalist design.

The building is considered part of Perth’s broader collection of surviving Inter-War Functionalist commercial architecture, contributing to the stylistic diversity of Murray Street and the surrounding central business district.

== Heritage significance ==
Magnet House is recognised by the City of Perth as a heritage place for its architectural and historical value. It is significant as a relatively intact example of Inter-War Functionalist commercial architecture in Perth and for its association with the city’s commercial expansion during the 1930s.

The building is also historically associated with the British General Electric Company, reflecting the role of international industrial and electrical firms in Western Australia’s urban development during the inter-war period. The distinctive magnet motif provides a rare example of corporate symbolism incorporated directly into architectural design.

In addition to its historical associations, Magnet House contributes to the visual and architectural character of Murray Street, forming part of a wider group of inter-war and post-war commercial buildings that illustrate the evolution of Perth’s central business district.
