= Pinned =

Studio album by A Place to Bury Strangers
- Released: April 13, 2018
- Length: 38:17
- Label: Dead Oceans

A Place to Bury Strangers chronology
Transfixiation (2015)	Pinned (2018)	Re-Pinned (2019)

Pinned is the fifth studio album by American noise rock band A Place to Bury Strangers. It was released on April 13, 2018, under Dead Oceans.

== Release ==
On January 31, 2018, the band announced the release of the album, alongside the first single "Never Coming Back". On March 1, 2018 the band released a music video directed by Elizabeth Skadden for the next single, "There's Only One of Us". The third single "Frustrated Operator" was released on April 11, 2018.

== Tour ==
The band announced a world tour in support of the album from March 2018 to June 2018.

== Critical reception ==
Professional ratings
Aggregate scores
Source	Rating
AnyDecentMusic?	5.9/10
Metacritic	68/100
Review scores
Source	Rating
AllMusic	4/5 stars
Clash	7/10
Crack	4/10
Drowned in Sound	4/10
Exclaim!	6/10
The Line of Best Fit	6/10
Pitchfork	5.3/10
Under the Radar	7.5/10

Pinned was met with "generally favorable" reviews from critics. At Metacritic, which assigns a weighted average rating out of 100 to reviews from mainstream publications, this release received an average score of 68, based on 10 reviews. Aggregator Album of the Year gave the release 61 out of 100 based on a critical consensus of 12 reviews.

=== Accolades ===
Accolades for Pinned
Publication	Accolade	Rank
ABC News	ABC News 50 Best Albums of 2018	46

== Track listing ==
Pinned track listing
No.	Title	Length
1.	"Never Coming Back"	5:14
2.	"Execution"	2:10
3.	"There's Only One of Us"	3:17
4.	"Situations Changes"	5:08
5.	"Too Tough to Kill"	2:07
6.	"Frustrated Operator"	2:28
7.	"Look Me in the Eye"	1:51
8.	"Was It Electric"	3:46
9.	"I Know I've Done Bad Things"	4:43
10.	"Act Your Age"	1:58
11.	"Attitude"	2:28
12.	"Keep Moving On"	3:07

== Charts ==
Chart performance for Pinned
Chart (2018)	Peak position
UK Independent Albums (Official Charts)	48
US Heatseekers Albums (Billboard)	14
US Independent Albums (Billboard)	31
US Vinyl Albums (Billboard)	14

== Personnel ==
- Miles Johnson – art direction
- Heba Kadry – mastering
- Ebru Yildiz – photography
