= Big Day Out =

Former annual music festival in Australia and New Zealand

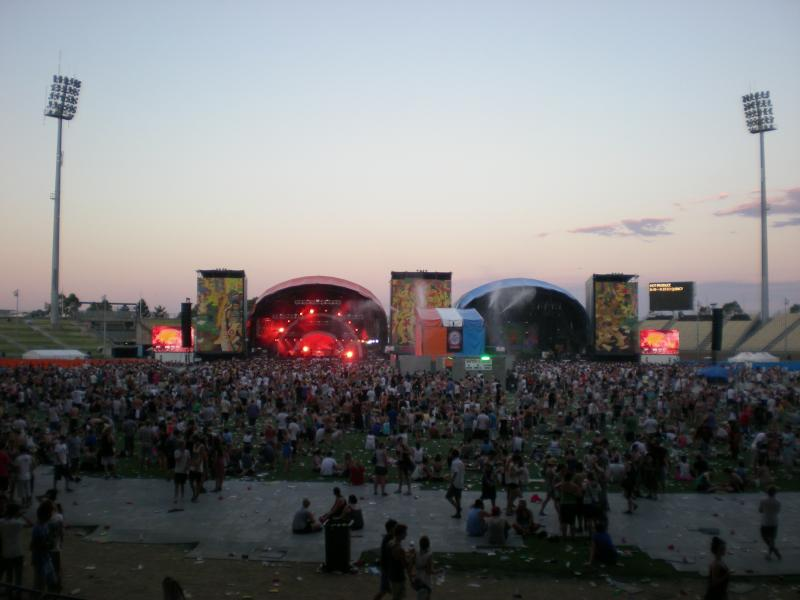
- Big Day Out Sydney, 2010
- Genre: Heavy metal; punk rock; rock; hip-hop; electronic; industrial; indie rock
- Dates: Late January – early February
- Locations: Australia: Sydney (1992–1997, 1999–2014); Melbourne (1993–1997, 1999–2014); Adelaide (1993–1997, 1999–2014); Perth (1993–1997, 1999–2014); Gold Coast (1994–1997, 1999–2014); New Zealand: Auckland (1994–1997, 1999–2012, 2014)
- Years active: 1992–1997, 1999–2014
- Founders: Ken West and Vivian Lees
- Website: Official website

The Big Day Out (BDO) was an annual music festival that was held in five Australian cities: Sydney, Melbourne, Gold Coast, Adelaide, and Perth, as well as Auckland, New Zealand. The festival was held during summer, typically in January of each year but was sometimes held as late as early February in some cities including Perth.

The event was conceptualised after the Violent Femmes announced a tour of Australia. Promoters Ken West and Vivian Lees sought another act as middle-level support for the band's tour. They succeeded in securing Nirvana to play the Sydney leg at the Hordern Pavilion.

The Big Day Out debuted on the 1992 Australia Day public holiday in Sydney and eventually expanded to Melbourne, Adelaide, and Perth the following year. The Gold Coast and Auckland were added to the schedule in 1994. As of 2003, it featured seven or eight stages (depending on the venue), accommodating popular contemporary rock music, electronic music, mainstream international acts, and local acts. Auckland was taken out of the tour schedule in 2013, but the festival returned to the city for its last run in 2014.

After the partnership between Ken West and Vivian Lees was dissolved in 2011, Lees sold his stake in the event to American festival promoters C3 Presents. In early June 2014, C3 attained full ownership of the Big Day Out festival and announced the cancellation of the 2015 event on 26 June 2014 with the option for the festival to return in the future left open. Despite this, the event has yet to return in subsequent years and as of 2022 there are currently no plans for any event to be held in future. Founder Ken West died in April 2022 at the age of 64.

== History ==
=== 1992–1997 ===
Annual music festivals had been gaining momentum for some time, and the United States had launched Lollapalooza in Chicago, Illinois in 1991. Australia had seen various music festivals but nothing annual. Big Day Out was founded by Ken West and Vivian Lees–the festival began in 1992 as a Sydney-only show, with the headline act, Violent Femmes, playing alongside Nirvana, and a range of other foreign and local alternative music acts, at the Hordern Pavilion. In 1993 the scope of the festival was extended to include Melbourne, Perth and Adelaide. West revealed in an interview that he was looking to create "urban mayhem" and "controlled chaos".

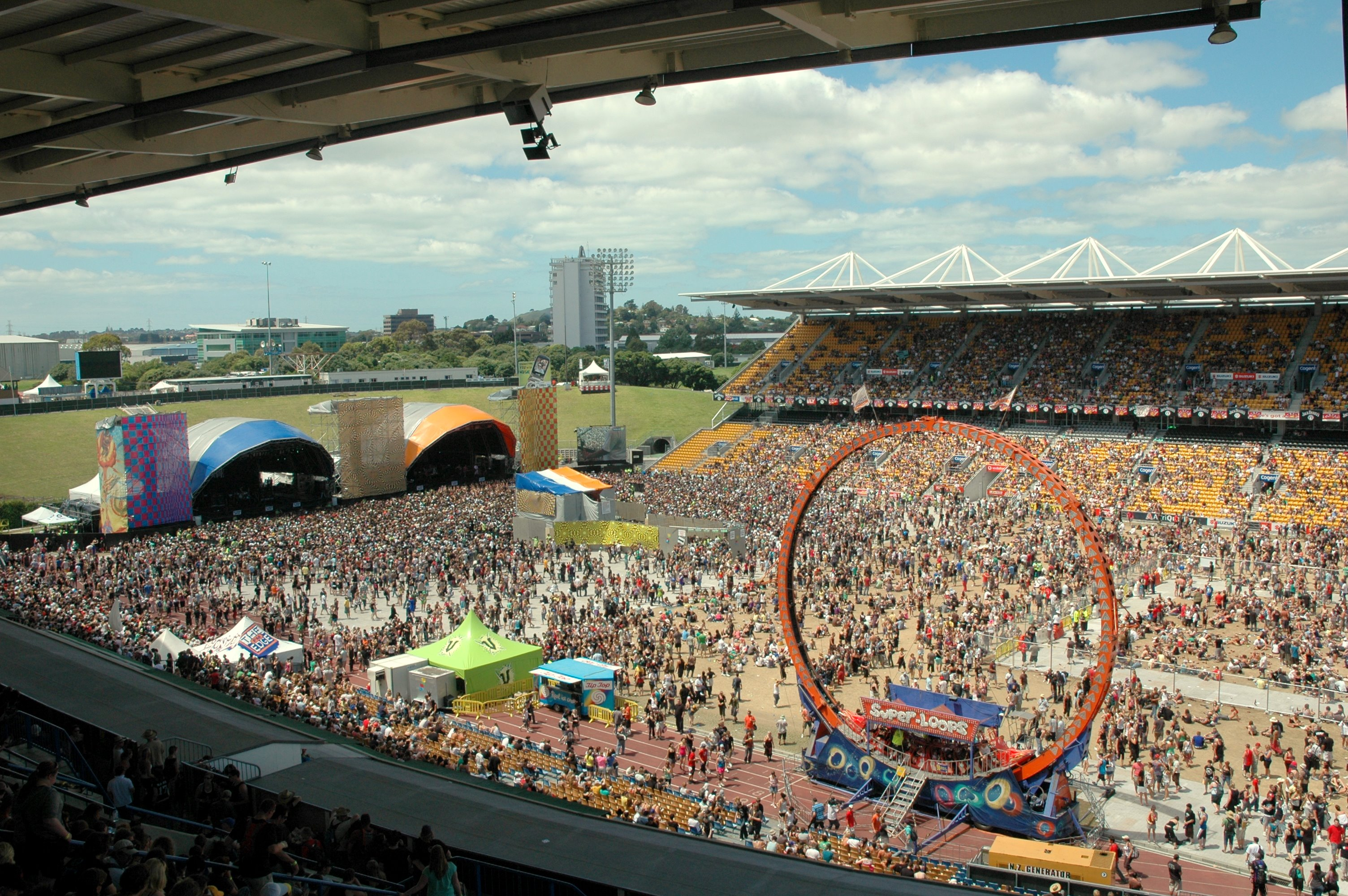
Big Day Out Double Stages, Auckland 2007. The festival expanded to Auckland in 1994 and held shows there each year, with the exception of 2013.

In 1994, the Big Day Out was extended further to include Auckland, New Zealand and the Gold Coast, and was held over a three-week period. The geographical locations of the 1994 festival occurred on an annual basis until 1997, when organisers West and Lees announced a year-long hiatus, causing concern that the festival was nearing the end of its existence; however, the festival returned in 1999.

=== 1999–2013 ===
Following the start of the 21st century, the festival was involved in two major controversies. Firstly, 16-year-old Jessica Michalik was killed after she was crushed at a 2001 Sydney show during a performance by the band Limp Bizkit. Michalik's death temporarily placed the future of the BDO festival in jeopardy, but the event continued after the Sydney Coroner's Court criticised the crowd control measures at the site and inflammatory comments made by Limp Bizkit's Fred Durst after the crush occurred.

The festival celebrated its 100th performance in 2010. In the period leading up to the 100-show milestone, which occurred at the second of two Sydney dates in 2010, Lees claimed in an Australian article that the BDO's ability to build relationships with acts during their careers had become an important part of the BDO culture. In the same Australian article, journalist Iain Shedden described the BDO as one of the "most successful and long-running rock festivals in the world", aligning the festival with the established Australian horse-racing event, the Melbourne Cup.

Lees also explained the growth and increased complexity of the festival in the 2010 Australian article, stating that, while a crew of 70 people crossed Australia in 1993 for the inaugural event, the 2010 festival consisted of 700 people. Lees highlighted the increased needs of Australian bands in his explanation:

It does get easier but it's also getting bigger and that makes it more complicated ... You're more confident about what you're doing and having some gravitas, but at the same time, because we're having more and more expectations put on us by everyone, the complexities are increasing. Even Aussie bands that used to take five or six people on the road are now taking 11. That seems to be the magic number, even for a new starting-off band. What they are doing is working to put on the best show they can. Through that the festival needs more production, more riders, more hotel rooms, more everything.

Due to the increasing popularity of the event, a second Sydney show was occasionally held. The extreme popularity of Metallica in 2004 led to this addition, followed by another second-show addition in Sydney for the 2010 event, when Muse was the headline act. A second Sydney date returned in 2011, in response to the co-headline acts, Tool and Rammstein.

In November 2011, the business partnership between Lees and West was dissolved, and the latter next partnered with Austin, United States (US)-based company C3 Presents, which runs the Lollapalooza festival in the US. C3 purchased a 51 per cent stake in the company following a split that was caused by "internal and external" pressures, whereby Lees severed all connections with the business. Prior to November 2011, Creative Festival Entertainment was the production company of the BDO festival.

On 17 January 2012, West announced that the Auckland BDO event, held on 20 January 2012, would be the last Big Day Out in New Zealand, explaining that the festival would only be held in Australia in 2013. However, in April 2013, the promoters said that they were seeking to reschedule an Auckland event in 2014 (at Western Springs Stadium instead of Mt Smart).

The 2012 festival was beset by difficulties and was described as "disastrous" by the Faster Louder website in June 2014. Headline act Kanye West did not appear at the Perth and Adelaide events, while a media report at the time alleged that "staging and fencing contractors had not been paid, sponsors were angry and the festival was beset by internal rifts, namely the firing and then apparent re-hiring of CEO Adam Zammit."

In 2013 the festival received staunch opposition from the Town of Claremont's mayor Jock Barker, who stated that music festivals in general introduce "appalling antisocial and criminal behaviour into a residential area." Although a study revealed that large-scale music festivals contribute approximately A$5.2 million to the state's economy, in addition to increased tourism and employment levels, Claremont councilor Peter Browne supported Barker's position by stating that the benefits of events such as the Big Day Out are "hopelessly outweighed by the intolerable noise, the late finish, the high level of criminal activity and general social misbehaviour in and outside of the grounds." Despite such opposition, the Claremont Showground venue in Perth, Western Australia was used by the BDO organisers for the 2013 event. The Perth leg of the 2014 BDO was held at the Arena Joondalup venue.

West announced to the media on 17 September 2013 that Arash "AJ" Maddah, a fellow Australian music festival promoter, had joined the Big Day Out enterprise. Although West explained that "the BDO team will now be C3, AJ Maddah and yours truly", Maddah stated to the media: "It's Ken's vision and I'm working for him. For 20 years it's been my ambition to work for the Big Day Out. It's been a great festival for 22 years. I don't need to fuck with that." As of the date of the announcement, Adam Zammit was the CEO of the company and Fairfax Media reported numerous job cuts.

An October 2013 Fairfax Media article then reported that the company's office space in the inner-city Sydney suburb of Surry Hills was being sold for A$5 million and an unnamed source informed Fairfax that the BDO company had also "recently lost some or all control over the lucrative sideshows." During the same time period, Lees publicly revealed that West had sold his stake in the company and the festival was facing serious problems.

=== 2014–present ===
Shortly after Maddah joined the BDO team, the headlining act for the 2014 festival, Blur, cancelled eight weeks prior to the commencement of their first 2014 BDO show. The band announced the cancellation on their Facebook fan page:

Devastated to report that Blur won't be performing at BDO in 2014. It's a shock that it has come to this. Only 8 weeks to go, the band feels that with the constantly shifting goalposts and challenging conditions of the organisers, they can't let it drag on any longer and want to make this announcement, to be clear to Blur fans that they won't be there. We've done our very best to work with the organisers and considered every option to make it happen, but they've let us down and let everyone else down too.

West previously explained in July 2013 that he had attempted to secure Blur for 14 years and their high status meant that they were considered a "white whale" act: "That [securing Blur] was a long negotiation ... Blur were going to be a headliner in various years but they couldn't get it together and more importantly they weren't connecting as a band." BDO organisers were as shocked by the cancellation as those people who had purchased tickets, as they had not received prior notification. Social media was the forum in which the public and media received updates, with Maddah first stating on Twitter that, in the time he had been with the festival, he had only seen the BDO team work as hard as possible to fulfil each of Blur's requests. Maddah later stated on Twitter that refund options would be available for those ticket-holders who no longer wished to attend due to Blur's announcement.

The second 2014 Sydney show was then officially cancelled on 26 September 2013 due to poor ticket sales—the show was merged into the first show on 26 January. In an official statement, West explained, "Perhaps we were a bit ambitious expanding to two dates in Sydney for this year's Big Day Out." Overall, the attendance figures for the 2014 festival were equivalent to around 50 per cent of the 2013 event. Approximately 15,000 tickets were sold for the Perth leg of the festival, leading to an announcement that the Big Day Out would not return to the western capital city. Maddah confirmed to the media that 31,000 people attended the Sydney leg on 26 January.

Maddah participated in an interview with the triple j radio station in February 2014 and said that he had not expected the festival to be financially successful in 2014:

I was under no illusion that it was going to be [anything but] a financial catastrophe—to say the least—this year. That was not even remotely in my mind, that I was going to walk in there and make any money this year.

Maddah further explained that the festival lost around A$10 million, but at the time of the interview, he was still awaiting the final financial results. Maddah cited overhead cost issues from the Perth leg as detrimental to the festival:

When you look through the financial history of most of the national festivals, the east coast has to subsidise events in Perth ... That's another reason why Big Day Out ticket prices were so high this year, because generally speaking you lose money in Perth. You've got two days to get there, three days to get back, all the trucking, all the production... a hotel room that you would pay $180 in Sydney is $320 a night in Perth in the same hotel chain. The price of hiring everything is ridiculous over there. Combine that will dropping public support for festivals over there and attendance figures and then for all your trouble you get a kicking from the local government and state government. It just got to a point where it's become unbearable.

On 25 June 2014, the Australian Music Feeds website published an article after it received documents showing that Maddah "stepped down as Big Day Out director and transferred his stake in the Australian festival entirely over to American partners, the Austin, Texas-based C3 Presents"—the arrangement was effective on 4 June 2014. Maddah's shares (held under the business name "Madjo BDO Pty Ltd") were transferred from West and an unnamed company in November 2013, thereby removing the last remaining cofounder from the business. The documents also revealed that the newly appointed director of the "BDO Presents" company, as of 4 June 2014, is a person named Blake Kendrick, while the company's new registered address belongs to an Australian law firm.

On 26 June 2014, the C3 company—founded by its managers, Charles Attal, Charlie Jones and Charlie Walker, in 2007—released an official statement in which it announced the cancellation of the 2015 Big Day Out; however, the company also stated that it enjoyed its involvement in the BDO festival and intends to "bring back the festival in future years".

In the wake of Maddah's sale and the C3 announcement, differing perspectives emerged in the media. On 26 June 2014, following the release of C3's official statement, Maddah insisted in a triple j interview that he remained involved with the festival and holds the option of buying back his stake in the company for 2016, the year that he insisted the festival will return. However, an anonymous source stated that Maddah is no longer involved, with C3 in control of all aspects of the BDO brand—from social media to intellectual property—while another unnamed source believes that C3 will "bankrupt the company, go back to America and forget about Australia." Lees also spoke with triple j on 26 June and, in addition to stating "It's a very dysfunctional arrangement with AJ [Maddah] being in the driver's seat", expressed an ongoing belief in the high status of the BDO festival:

The Big Day Out has been, and will always be, the festival in Australia. And if people are expecting something better to come along tomorrow, then they shouldn't be holding their breath, because it's not going to happen. Big Day Out set the high benchmark which is not going to be succeeded by a one-day festival in the near future for sure.

After the New York Times announced "advanced talks" between Live Nation and C3 Presents in early October 2014, the purchase of a 51-per cent stake in the Austin company was confirmed on 22 December of the same year. Described at the time of the acquisition as "the largest independent concerts company in its space", C3 reported revenue to the value of US$124 million in 2013 and was targeted by Live Nation for its festival portfolio. The C3 founders told reporters that they were "excited" by the development, but made no mention of the Big Day Out festival. It has not returned since then.

== Artist lineups ==
Since its inception in 1992, Big Day Out has attracted a large range of artists, with headlining acts including Nirvana, Pearl Jam, Kanye West, The Smashing Pumpkins, The White Stripes, Chemical Brothers, Blink 182, The Strokes, Muse, Hole, Violent Femmes, Iggy Pop and the Stooges, The Ramones, Soundgarden, Rammstein, System of a Down, Limp Bizkit, Nine Inch Nails, Rage Against the Machine, The Prodigy, Marilyn Manson, Foo Fighters, Metallica, Tool, The Offspring, Neil Young and Red Hot Chili Peppers. The annual festival has also been a launching platform for many Australian artists, with various acts performing on the tour multiple times, such as Silverchair, Regurgitator, Powderfinger, You Am I, The Living End, Jebediah, The Vines, Grinspoon, Nick Cave and the Bad Seeds, Kisschasy, and Wolfmother.

== Festival venues ==
City	Venue	2014 Crowd
Auckland	Western Springs Stadium	40,000+
Gold Coast	Carrara Stadium	35,000+
Melbourne	Flemington Racecourse	50,000+
Sydney	Sydney Showground Stadium	150,000+
Adelaide	Wayville Showgrounds	30,000+
Perth	Claremont Showgrounds	30,000+

== Venues within the festival ==
=== Boiler Room ===
The Boiler Room was an indoor dance venue hosting dance and electronica artists at the Big Day Out. The concept was started in 1993, when only two bands, Severed Heads and Itch-E & Scratch-E, performed. The Boiler Room was established as a fixture from 1994 (the first with solely dance music) as the first big dance music stage of the Big Day Out, and soon became very popular, with DJ Fatboy Slim leading the lineup in 1999. Ben Suthers programmed the lineup for 15 years, until 2014. Also in 1999, British band Underworld played the Boiler Room in Sydney and Melbourne. In 1996, The Prodigy played, and in 1997, British artist Aphex Twin. Australian DJ and producer Groove Terminator said of his first Boiler Room experience "In Adelaide, we played a lot harder and faster than anywhere else". As LCD Soundsystem rose to popularity (2006-2007), the programming moved towards indie rock and slightly away from "the club sound". Other performers in the Boiler Room over the years included Simian Mobile Disco, Dizzee Rascal, The Chemical Brothers, Basement Jaxx, Goldie, and The Presets (2006).

The Boiler Room was a significant cultural phenomenon, which changed Australian music fans' perception of dance music, and was credited with bringing electronic music and culture to rock fans. DJ BeXta said "genres were developing as Big Day Out and the Boiler Room was developing". Programmer Sutherland said in 2019: "Trying to get a whole bunch of people who maybe only ever listened to Nirvana, listening to dance music. That's its legacy."

== Controversy ==
=== Death of Jessica Michalik ===
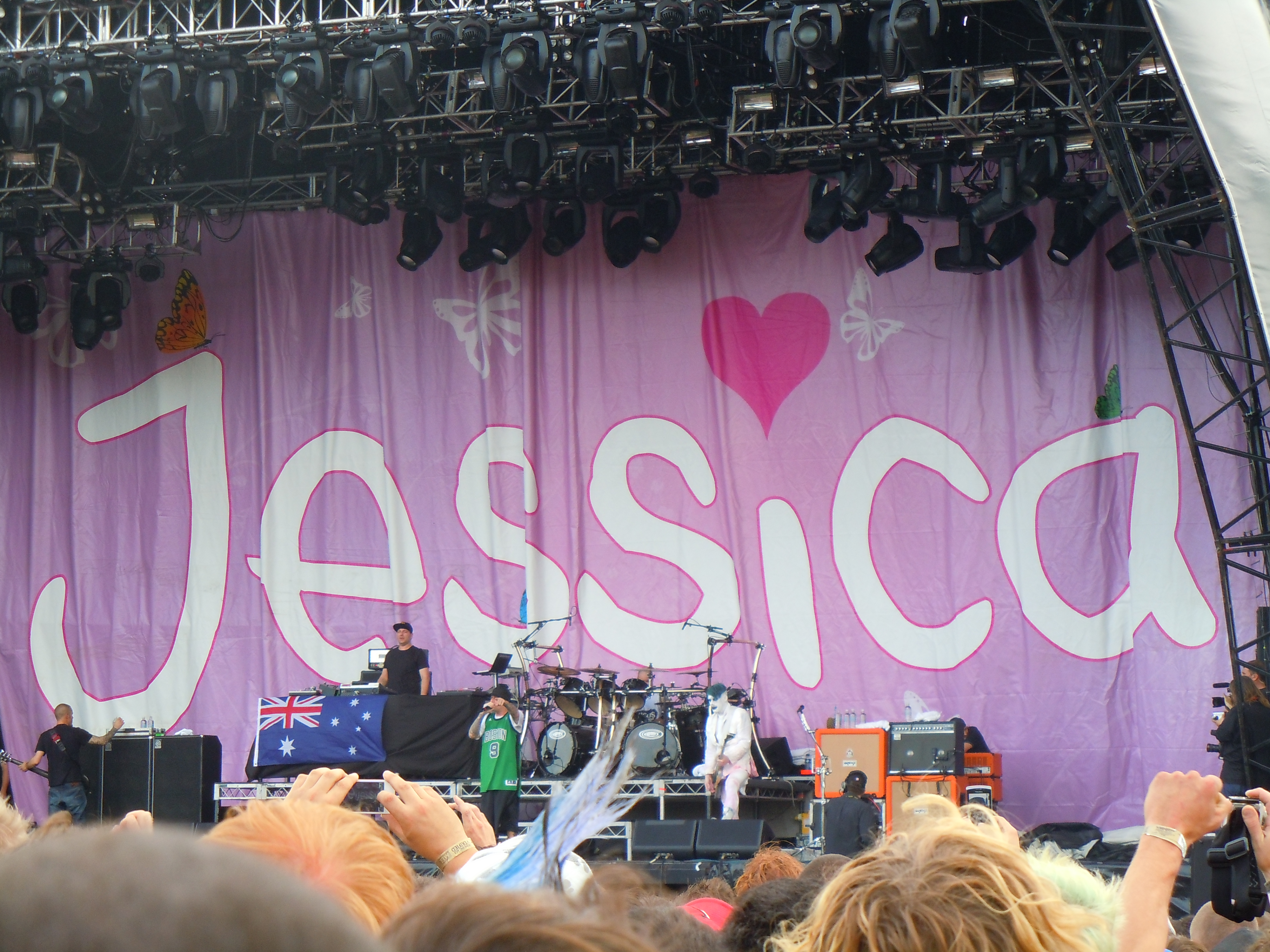
Limp Bizkit's tribute to Jessica Michalik during the 2012 Soundwave festival

During the 2001 Big Day Out festival in Sydney, Jessica Michalik was crushed in a mosh pit during a performance by the band Limp Bizkit. The crush reportedly occurred as the band began playing "My Generation". The band were then cut short by medical personnel and security staff as they attempted to play "Re-Arranged", after which the band took a 15-minute break before resuming their performance. Michalik was revived and rushed to Concord Hospital, but died of a heart attack five days later.

According to a review of the band's performance by Metal Hammer, Limp Bizkit's frontman, Fred Durst, encouraged the crowd "to settle down" twice during the performance. Durst also claimed the band had attempted to take precautions that fell on deaf ears, "We begged, we screamed, we sent letters, we tried to take precautions, because we are Limp Bizkit, we know we cause this big emotional blister of a crowd". The following day, Limp Bizkit had left Australia without telling the organisers, who only discovered the band's departure through a note left at the hotel.

Senior deputy state coroner Jacqueline Milledge issued a statement saying responsibility was on the Big Day Out's promoters Creative Entertainment Australia, saying there was overwhelming evidence that crowd density was dangerous when Limp Bizkit went on stage. Limp Bizkit was also criticised in the report, Milledge saying that Durst could have taken the situation more seriously, with his comments on stage during the attempt to rescue Michalik "alarming and inflammatory".

Michalik's parents filed separate wrongful death claims naming promoters and security personnel, and in one claim, Limp Bizkit. A New South Wales court dismissed the band and all parties connected with the band from the claim, finding they were not liable.

In 2005, United National Insurance sued Limp Bizkit in an attempt to avoid paying legal fees arising from Michalik's death. The company claimed in the lawsuit, which was filed on 11 August 2005, that Durst had incited the audience at the festival to rush the stage.

=== Flag ban ===
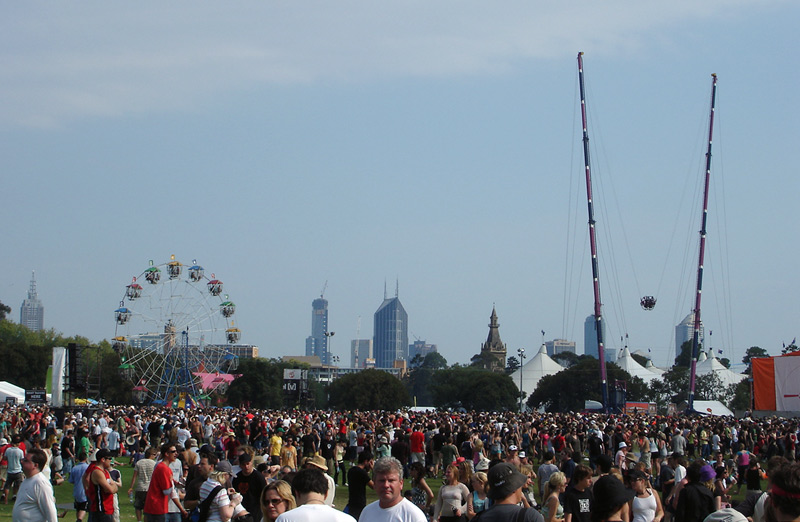
Entertainment at the 2006 Big Day Out in Melbourne

On 21 January 2007, a decision was made by the organisers to discourage Big Day Out patrons in Sydney from bringing and displaying the Australian flag. The organisers said the decision was a result of recent ethnic tensions in Sydney and complaints that the previous year's festival had been marred by roving packs of aggressive flag-draped youths.

Sections of the community had strong views in support of or objection to the policy. Prime Minister John Howard, New South Wales Premier Morris Iemma, and Federal Leader of the Opposition Kevin Rudd all condemned the move. Iemma suggested the event be cancelled if the organisers could not secure the attendees' safety. Main stage act Jet performed in front of a large backdrop of a black-and-white Australian flag cut-out of their name, with lead vocalist Nic Cester adding, "I can't tell anyone else what to do but we as a band are very proud to be Australian and we don't want to feel we are not allowed to feel proud".

Other people including Andrew Bartlett of the Australian Democrats, sports writer Peter FitzSimons, and members of the hip-hop outfit The Herd expressed concern that the flag was being misused by a handful of aggressive attendees in a jingoist manner and that rock concerts were not the appropriate venue to be waving a flag.

On the first day of the 2007 Sydney Big Day Out, significant numbers of patrons attended the event wearing Australian flag-related apparel or carrying Australian flags. No one was refused entry and no flag-related material or clothing was confiscated. After that date, there were no further suggestions of banning the Australian flag from Big Day Out events.

=== Drugs ===
Drug use is associated with many Australian music festivals, including Big Day Out, with anecdotal reports strongly indicating that alcohol continues to be the most prevalent drug at all events. Police have intercepted suspected users and dealers by placing drug sniffing dogs at some entrances of each festival and patrolling the event (see New South Wales Police Force strip search scandal). At the 2008 festival in Sydney, police made 86 drug-related arrests. In 2009, 107 people were detained for drug violations. At the 2009 Perth leg of the festival tour, more than 70 arrests were charged with drug-related offences.

==== Death of Gemma Thoms ====
At the 2009 Big Day Out festival in Perth, 17-year-old Gemma Thoms collapsed after allegedly taking three ecstasy tablets. She died 12 hours later in Sir Charles Gairdner Hospital, after being transferred from the event's first-aid post. The girl and her friend reportedly took one tablet each whilst at home before the event. After arriving, she saw police near the entrance, panicked, and swallowed another two tablets. Police later denied responsibility for Thoms' death, suggesting that no sniffer dogs were being used to search patrons at the entrance she had used. They agreed that "There may have been a perceived fear of being detected". Thoms had been driven by car and had not taken the train to the station where police were searching.

=== Beenie Man and Odd Future ===
In November 2009, gay rights groups in New Zealand protested after controversial rapper Beenie Man was included in the second round of announcements for the 2010 tour. Groups such as GayNZ.com cited controversial and homophobic lyrics from Beenie Man's songs such as "I'm dreaming of a new Jamaica/Come to execute all the gays". The group called for Big Day Out organisers to drop Beenie Man from the lineup "to send a message that homophobia is unacceptable", and over 850 people joined a Facebook group to oppose his appearance.

On 15 November 2009, the festival's Australian organisers issued a statement on their website confirming that Beenie Man had indeed been dropped from the lineup. Whilst they acknowledged his commitment to the 2007 Reggae Compassionate Act and his promises to not perform the offending songs on his tour, they ultimately made the decision to drop Beenie Man because they felt his appearance would "be divisive amongst our audience members and would mar the enjoyment of the event for many."

In early November in 2011, ahead of the 2012 Big Day Out, a request was made by Auckland City Council to remove Odd Future from line up due to some of their lyrics being allegedly homophobic. The promoters agreed, and put an Odd Future sideshow on in Auckland outside of the Big Day Out.

== Compilation albums ==
- Big Day Out 00 (2000)
- Big Day Out 01 (2001)
- Discrespective (2002)
- Big Day Out 03 (2003)
- Big Day Out 04 (2004)
- Big Day Out 05 (2005)
- Big Day Out 06 (2006)

== See also ==
- List of historic rock festivals
- List of hip hop music festivals
- List of festivals in Australia
- Tony Mott
