= Death By Audio =

Warehouse space in Brooklyn, New York, United States

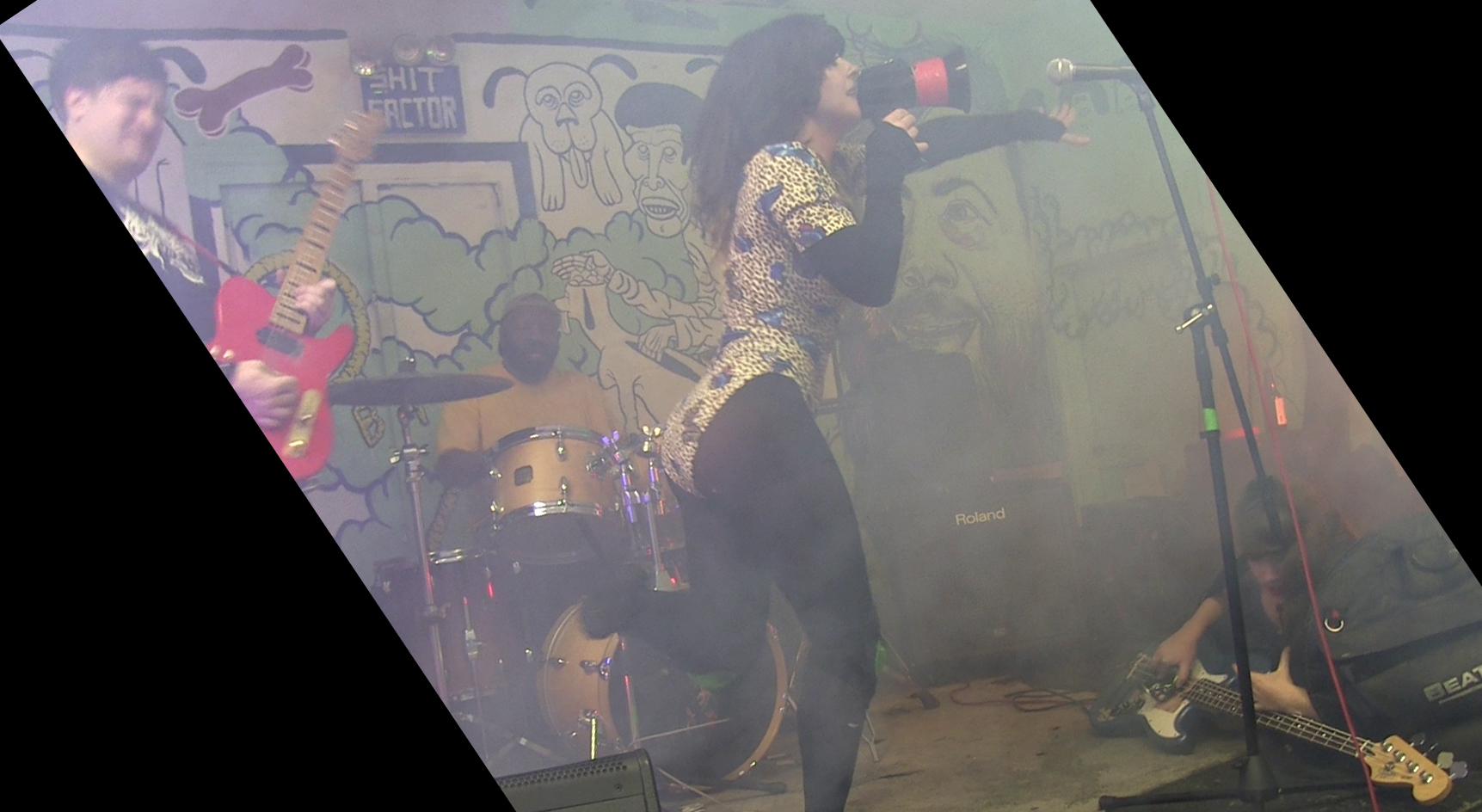
Cellular Chaos (Weasel Walter and Marc Edwards) at Death By Audio

Death By Audio was a warehouse space on the first floor of an industrial building in the Williamsburg neighborhood of Brooklyn, New York. The warehouse took its name from the boutique effects pedal company, Death By Audio, based in the space. The company was founded in 2002 by Oliver Ackermann, the lead singer of the New York City-based noise rock band A Place to Bury Strangers.

The warehouse operated primarily as a work space for artists and musicians, but also functioned as a recording studio, effects pedal factory, as well as an art and music venue, which received generally positive reviews from critics.

Starting in the spring of 2007 part of the space had been used as a venue for underground music and art events. Artists such as Ty Segall, Dirty Projectors, Growing, Tony Conrad, Thurston Moore, R. Stevie Moore, Thee Oh Sees, Zach Hill, Paint It Black, Future Islands, Black Pus, Pissed Jeans, JEFF the Brotherhood, Hammerhead, Frank Sidebottom, Guerilla Toss, and Dan Deacon have performed at Death By Audio. The venue was run by Jason Amos and Matt Conboy.

In 2007, the collective started Death By Audio Records in order to release material by the bands that practiced in the warehouse. Death By Audio Records began by releasing a cassette tape by Sisters and a double EP by Coin Under Tongue. The label released Rejoicer, the debut album by Grooms in 2009 before it was re-released on Kanine Records. In 2010, the label released albums by Brooklyn's Starring, French Miami and Minneapolis' Seawhores.

In April 2008 the venue received non-profit status.

In August 2013, an art book containing live recordings from 2012 at Death By Audio was released on Famous Class Records.

In later 2014, Vice Media rented the building Death By Audio was located in, forcing them to shut the venue down. The last show held at the space was on November 22, 2014, headlined by Lightning Bolt.

In 2016, Matt Conboy released a documentary about the space called "Goodnight Brooklyn - The Story of Death by Audio".

== Bands and artists ==
- A Place to Bury Strangers
- Cheeky
- Coin Under Tongue
- Dirty on Purpose
- Famous Amos
- French Miami
- Fuck Ton
- Grooms
- The Immaculates
- Sisters
