= Oliver Ackermann =

American rock musician (born 1976)

- Born: November 22, 1976 (age 48); Allentown, Pennsylvania, U.S.
- Origin: Fredericksburg, Virginia, U.S.
- Genres: Noise rock, shoegazing, post-punk, experimental rock
- Occupation(s): Musician, effects equipment engineer
- Instrument(s): Guitar, vocals
- Labels: Killer Pimp, Vacancy Records Important Records, Mute, Dead Oceans, Death By Audio
- Member of: A Place to Bury Strangers
- Formerly of: Skywave
- Website: www.deathbyaudio.com

Oliver Edward Ackermann (born November 22, 1976) is an American rock musician, who is the founder of the Brooklyn-based effects pedal company Death By Audio and is guitarist and vocalist for A Place to Bury Strangers, a rock band hailed as "the loudest band in New York".

== Biography ==
Ackermann was born in Allentown, Pennsylvania. He spent his childhood in St. Peter, Minnesota and Fredericksburg, Virginia attending Falmouth Elementary School, Drew Middle School, and Stafford High School.

Ackermann studied Industrial Design at the Rhode Island School of Design. He returned to Fredericksburg, Virginia and worked at Zolo Designs.

Ackermann currently resides in Brooklyn, New York and is a contributor to the Death By Audio space and collective.

=== Musical career ===
In 1995, Ackermann formed Skywave with Paul Baker. The duo joined with John Fedowitz on drums and put out recordings and toured during 1998 to 2003.

In 2002, Ackermann started the effects pedal company Death By Audio.

When Baker and Fedowitz formed Ceremony, Ackermann moved to Brooklyn in 2003 and formed the band A Place to Bury Strangers with Tim Gregorio on bass and Justin Avery on drums.

In 2007, he teamed up with Richard Fearless from Death In Vegas to form Black Acid only to later disband it as A Place to Bury Strangers was gaining global acclaim.

=== Death by Audio ===
At Death by Audio, Ackermann designs and manufactures hand-wired guitar-effects pedals, and has provided custom effects equipment to bands such as U2, Wilco, and Nine Inch Nails.

The former Death By Audio location also operated as a live/work environment for artists and musicians, recording studio, and art/music venue.
