= Shannon O'Neill (comedian) =

American comedian, actress, writer, and director

O'Neill in 2011

Shannon Patricia O'Neill is an American comedian, actress, writer, and director who worked as the artistic director of the Upright Citizens Brigade. O'Neill was a regular guest on The Chris Gethard Show and has had numerous roles in film and television. In 2020, O'Neill appeared as Sonja Farak in How to Fix a Drug Scandal, a true crime documentary miniseries. In the series, O'Neill recreates Farak's court testimony using official transcripts from her grand jury trial. In the wake of the UCB closing, O'Neill began co-hosting the live improv show RaaaatScraps in 2021 at the Caveat theater in New York.

== Filmography ==
=== Film ===
Year	Title	Role	Notes
2011	A Kiss for Jed	A.D.	
2016	Thank You, Del: The Story of the Del Close Marathon	Self	Documentary
2018	Most Likely to Murder	Officer O'brien	
2020	Black Bear	Simone	
2020	Uncle Peckerhead	Jen Jennings	
2022	Bros	Paula	
2024	Which Brings Me to You	Lyft Driver	

=== Television ===
Year	Title	Role	Notes
2007	The Jeannie Tate Show		Episode #1.3
2010, 2014	Broad City	Ms. O'Neil / Marla Bevers	Episodes: "Dog Sitting", "Hurricane Wanda"
2010	Vag Magazine	Jaybird	2 episodes
2010–2016	UCB Comedy Originals	Various	26 episodes
2011	UCB Live!	Various	Sketch show
2011–2018	The Chris Gethard Show	Panelist / Sir Titus	108 episodes
2012, 2013	The Side Car	Slapback	2 episodes
2013	Above Average Presents	Self	Episode: "Gay Dogs"
2013	The Morning Announcements	Nurse Klepper	Episode #1.4
2014	What to Expect	The Aunt From Tempe	Episode: "What to Expect: When You Tell Someone You're a Lesbian"
2014	Monkey Love	FBI Agent	Episode: "All Things Must End"
2014	Gary Saves the Graveyard	Self	5 episodes
2015	Man Seeking Woman	Judith	Episode: "Stain"
2015	Donny!	Stage Manager	6 episodes
2016	Netflix Presents: The Characters	Sharon	Episode: "Tim Robinson"
2016	Why Women Kill	Alex	Miniseries
2016	Animal Agent	Hanna Walker	
2016	Debate Wars	Self	Episode: "Nature Vs. Nurture"
2016	Thanksgiving	Uber Driver	4 episodes
2017	Difficult People	Assistant Director	Episode: "Strike Rat"
2017	Neon Joe, Werewolf Hunter	Ashley Tritt	5 episodes
2018, 2019	High Maintenance	Barry	2 episodes
2019	The Other Two	Assistant Director	Episode: "Chase Shoots a Music Video"
2019	Alternatino with Arturo Castro		Episode: "The Gift"
2020	The Iliza Shlesinger Sketch Show	Delyn the Lesbian	Episode #1.3
2020	How to Fix a Drug Scandal	Sonja Farak	Main role; miniseries
2020	Loafy	Penelope (voice)	4 episodes
2020	Make America Bake Again	Angie	Post-production
2020	The George Lucas Talk Show	Self	3 episodes
