= Speed Demon (2026 film) =

2026 American horror thriller film

- Theatrical release poster
- Directed by: Jon Keeyes
- Written by: Domenico Salvaggio
- Produced by: Katie Cassidy; Cecil Chambers; Vanessa Coifman; Richard Switzer
- Starring: Katie Cassidy; William H. Macy
- Cinematography: Austin F. Schmidt
- Edited by: R.J. Cooper
- Music by: Aoife O'Leary; Gerry Owens
- Production company: Triumphant Pictures
- Distributed by: Front Row Filmed Entertainment; Complex Corp; Maverick Films; Superfine Films
- Release dates: April 25, 2026 (USA Film Festival); May 31, 2026 (United States)
- Running time: 93 minutes
- Country: United States
- Language: English

Speed Demon is a 2026 American supernatural horror-thriller film directed by Jon Keeyes and starring Katie Cassidy and William H. Macy. The film's plot combines elements of supernatural possession with a runaway train disaster scenario.

The film was released simultaneously in select theaters and via digital platforms on May 31, 2026.

== Plot ==
The rebellious novice nun Sister Lu struggles with her faith and considers leaving the Church. Her mentor, exorcist Father Novak takes her on a high-speed train traveling from Montreal to New York.

During the journey, a passenger unknowingly releases the ancient demon Asmodeus, which possesses him. The possessed passenger kills the conductor, destroys the train's controls, and the train accelerates out of control. Meanwhile, Sister Lu acquaints herself with a few passengers in the train, including a smart young child and her nanny, a young couple, a petty thief and a grumpy old man. Supernatural events consume each carriage. Father Novak realizes that the demon is using fear and despair to strengthen its influence, making conventional exorcism methods increasingly ineffective. Sister Lu is forced to confront both the demon and her own doubts. She then finds Novak severely wounded and dead, leaving Sister Lu to continue the ritual alone.

Guided by Novak's teachings and her renewed faith, Sister Lu performs a full exorcism against Asmodeus in the locomotive. The ritual weakens the demon long enough for the surviving passengers to separate its host from the entity. Asmodeus is ultimately banished, allowing the train's emergency systems to engage and preventing a catastrophic derailment.

Following the incident, the Vatican officially recognizes Sister Lu as an exorcist after she successfully completed her first independent exorcism. In a mid-credits scene, Vatican officials investigate evidence suggesting that the demonic outbreak was part of a larger supernatural conspiracy, hinting at future confrontations between the Church and forces of evil.

== Cast ==
- Katie Cassidy as Sister Lu
- William H. Macy as Father Novak
- John Patrick Jordan as Gabriel
- Michael Emery as Roman
- Sari Arambulo as Vicky
- Sabrina Schlegel-Mejia as Mireille
- Onika Day as Madame Secretary
- Jeremy Feight as David
- Sky Vaux Fuller as Sofia
- Ray Faiola as The Pope
- Michael John Improta as Louis
- Allen McCullough as Edwin
- George Banghart Jr. As Passenger
- Noriko Sato as Nancy

== Production ==
- The film was directed by Jon Keeyes, known for directing the 2024 thriller Cult Killer. Written by Domenico Salvaggio, who wrote the 2011 suspense-thriller Die.
- Lead actress Katie Cassidy took an active role behind the scenes by serving as a main producer on the film, alongside Cecil Chambers and Vanessa Coifman.
- Richard Switzer, Ian Niles, Andy Thompson, James Norrie, Nina Kolokouri, Stephen Huszar, Daniel Ford Beavis, Kevin Paulhus, Bayann Oluyadi, Saleem Elmasri, Clay Pecorin, John Marques, and Tyler W. Konney are the executive producer and co-producer of the film.
- The film's distribution rights were picked up by Maverick Film and Complex Corp.
- The film is an independent genre film, it relies heavily on practical special effects to capture the claustrophobic horror of the train cars rather than massive, big-studio CGI budgets. Director Jon Keeyes noted in production statements that the movie leans heavily on a mix of fast-paced action, practical demon effects, and character-driven horror.

== Release ==
The official trailer for Speed Demon was released in early May 2026. The film was premiered at the 56th Annual USA Film Festival in Dallas on April 25, 2026. The film also had an early release in the Philippines on May 21, 2026, and it set for a simultaneous limited theatrical and on-demand digital release in US on May 31, 2026.

== Reception ==
On the review aggregator website Rotten Tomatoes, 64% of 11 critics' reviews are positive, with an average rating of 5.3/10.

Peter Martin of ScreenAnarchy gave the film a rating of 3 out of 5 and wrote: Convincingly effective as both nun and demon fighter, Katie Cassidy lends her considerable grace to a role that may initially sound risible, yet proves to be soundly entertaining in a swiftly-moving B-movie vein.

Nathaniel Muir of AIPT also gave the film a positive feedback and wrote: A brief and unremarkable funeral scene leads to one of the best epilogues of any film this year. It involves some of the most powerful people in the world while hinting at a secret group controlled by the Vatican.

Matt Donato of Daily Dead gave the film a 1.5 out of 5 rating and a negative feedback and wrote: The only race against time here is how quickly you'll be fighting sleep, defying the adage about how it's impossible to look away from a trainwreck.
