= Bloody Axe Wound =

2024 American horror comedy slasher film

- Directed by: Matthew John Lawrence
- Written by: Matthew John Lawrence
- Produced by: Hilarie Burton Morgan; Mary Stuart Masterson; Wicky Mendoza; Matthew John Lawrence
- Starring: Sari Arambulo; Molly Brown; Billy Burke; Jeffrey Dean Morgan
- Cinematography: Kyle I. Kelley; Michael Sutter
- Music by: Evan Garcia-Renart; Miles Taylour-Sweeney
- Production companies: BullMoose Pictures; Dynamatt Productions
- Distributed by: RLJE Films; Shudder
- Release date: December 27, 2024
- Running time: 83 minutes
- Country: United States
- Language: English
- Box office: $78,076

Bloody Axe Wound is a 2024 American horror comedy slasher film, written and directed by Matthew John Lawrence. It stars Sari Arambulo, Molly Brown, Billy Burke, and Jeffrey Dean Morgan. The film follows teenager Abbie Bladecut (Arambulo) through her coming of age journey as the daughter of famous serial killer Roger Bladecut (Burke). It received mixed reviews from critics, who praised its performances and genre-blending plot twists, but criticized its slapstick tone.

== Plot ==
Abbie is the adopted daughter of Roger Bladecut, a prolific serial killer. The family makes their money by selling tapes of Roger's slayings at their struggling horror themed video rental store. It is never clarified how the recordings are made or who makes them, and Roger is not the only filmed killer. The family only receives information telling them who must be killed and after completion the tapes appear on the store's doorstep. One evening the Bladecuts receive a new list of teenage victims. Abbie learns that Roger intends to enlist his part-time employee Makenzie as the 'Son of Bladecut', enraging her as she desperately wants to follow in his footsteps. Roger offers an olive branch by allowing Abbie to come along as a behind-the-scenes assistant, however the outing goes poorly and Roger dies of a heart attack. Abbie buries him so he can resurrect, however Roger is unable to exit the grave on his own, forcing him to realize that he is getting too old to be an effective serial killer. The following night Abbie is sent to assist Mackenzie, only for him to accidentally kill himself while stalking two victims. Abbie is forced to slay them herself, an act that leaves her nauseated. She then decides to take over as the 'Spawn of Bladecut', enlisting her friend Glenn as a helper in exchange for him appearing in the movies as a non-victim. Despite his concern that women cannot be as effective as a man at serial killing, Roger decides to support Abbie.

Abbie decides to enroll at the local high school to stalk the remaining victims, Izzy, Patty, Sam, and Mitch, befriending them and falling for one of them, Sam. This concerns Roger, who warns her that this will make it harder to kill them later. He is proven right when Abbie fails to kill Izzy, causing Roger to kill her instead. The remaining teens decide to try and leave the town but end up hiding out in an abandoned summer camp, the site of Roger's origin story. That night Roger kills Mitch, prompting Patty to correctly assume that Abbie is involved. Patty almost kills Abbie, but is instead killed by Sam, who is unaware of Abbie's involvement. Sam and Abbie are then chased by Roger, who pins Sam to the ground, where he starts choking her to death. Unwilling to see the woman she loves die, Abbie kills Roger, in the process calling him 'dad'. This angers Sam, who starts to confront Abbie but is killed by Roger, who had enough life left in him to perform one last kill.

Afterward, Abbie decides to close down the video store despite receiving a shipment of the new film. Later that night Abbie hears the thunder that normally occurs during her father's revivals. She heads to his grave, which is now empty. The film ends with the appearance of a newly revived Sam, as Abbie chose to bury her in her father's grave.

== Cast ==
- Sari Arambulo as Abbie Bladecut
- Molly Brown as Sam Crane
- Billy Burke as Roger Bladecut
- Jeffrey Dean Morgan as Butch Slater
- Eddie Leavy as Glenn
- Sage Spielman as Laverne
- Margot Anderson-Song as Patty
- Matt Hopkins as Makenzie
- Jaden Slater as Mitch
- David Littleton as Mark
- Keaton Morris-Stan as Drunk Lady
- Jahdey Wright as Bryant
- Rena Burkhart as Hip Girl
- Lizzy Cenicola as Daisy

== Production ==
Director Matthew Lawrence began writing script for Bloody Axe Wound around 2014, but was unable to get it produced until after 2020, when interest increased due to his film Uncle Peckerhead. Production for Bloody Axe Wound began in 2023 and filming took place near Saugerties, New York over a period of 18 days.

== Release ==
Bloody Axe Wound received a limited theatrical release in the United States on December 27, 2024. This was followed by a VOD release on streaming platform Shudder on March 21, 2025.

== Reception ==
Bloody Axe Wound holds a rating of 29% on Rotten Tomatoes, based on 17 reviews.
