= Glen Woodall =

Glen Dale Woodall was a victim of a miscarriage of justice in West Virginia. He was an itinerant gravedigger and handyman, who was sent to prison for a crime that DNA evidence has subsequently cleared him of.

Samples of his blood were sent to the state crime lab and were matched to two sexual assaults at the Huntington Mall by state crime lab serology expert Fred Zain. On July 8, 1987, Woodall was found guilty in Cabell County Circuit Court, sentenced to 203 to 335 years in prison and sent to the West Virginia State Penitentiary in Moundsville to serve his sentence. On May 4, 1992, Woodall was found to be innocent and to have been convicted on false evidence. Zain was subsequently found to have participated in the "framing" of hundreds of persons, and the West Virginia Supreme Court ordered new trials.

Woodall then settled with the state, receiving $1,000,000, and moved to Florida.

On April 1, 2011, Donald Good was convicted of the rapes. Good had already been convicted in 1996 of a 1992 murder and was serving a life sentence at the time of this conviction.

== See also ==
- List of wrongful convictions in the United States
