= The Survivalist (2021 film) =

- Theatrical release poster
- Directed by: Jon Keeyes
- Written by: Matthew Rogers
- Produced by: Jon Keeyes; Jordan Yale Levine; Jordan Beckerman
- Starring: Jonathan Rhys Meyers; John Malkovich; Thaddeus Street; Jon Orsini; Ruby Modine
- Production companies: Yale Productions; Highland Myst Entertainment; RSM
- Distributed by: Quiver Distribution
- Release date: October 1, 2021
- Country: United States
- Language: English

The Survivalist is a 2021 American action thriller film directed by Jon Keeyes and written by Matthew Rogers starring Jonathan Rhys Meyers and John Malkovich. It is about woman who is thought to be immune to a pandemic who is fleeing from a religious leader and his followers who think she could be a cure. It was released in the United States on October 1, 2021, by Quiver Distribution.

== Plot ==
In a world decimated by the Delta variant of the COVID-19 virus, Sarah Street is relentlessly hunted by religious fanatic Aaron Ramsey who miraculously survived the virus. Aaron seeks Sarah because she is supposed to be immune to the virus and could thus hold the key to a potential cure.

Escaping a refugee camp in Pennsylvania where 20,000 people died of the virus with her brother, who sacrifices himself to protect her, Sarah makes her way to the home of Ben Grant, a former FBI cartographer turned survivalist following the murder of his father. Ben protects Sarah against Aaron and his marauders, slowly killing them all off.

However, Sarah eventually reveals that she's not actually immune: she's simply an asymptomatic carrier of the virus. After Sarah's presence infected the refugee camp, the doctors had lied about her immunity rather than admitting to their mistake. Ben eventually defeats Aaron who is then killed by Sarah. Ben and Sarah decide to leave and search for other survivors who might be working on a cure, particularly as Ben has likely caught the virus himself due to his extended contact with Sarah.

== Cast ==
- Jonathan Rhys Meyers as Ben Grant
- John Malkovich as Aaron Neville Ramsey
- Ruby Modine as Sarah Street
- Jenna Leigh Green as Marley Harrelson
- Julian Sands as Heath Grant
- Thaddeus Street as Matthew Ramirez
- Jon Orsini as Owen Hanley
- Rob Dubar as Jackson Everett
- Obi Abili as John Larsson
- Simon Phillips as Danny
- Tom Pecinka as Guy Street, Sarah's Brother
- Lori Petty as Radio Operator (voice)

== Production ==
Filming wrapped in December 2020.

== Release ==
The Survivalist (2021) was released on VOD platforms on October 1, 2021. It was made available on Redbox kiosks for DVD rental on October 1, 2021, and for sale on DVD and Blu-Ray on October 19, 2021.

== Reception ==
Leslie Felperin of The Guardian awarded the film two stars out of five and wrote, "The palette of sludge and gravel doesn’t help and the performances represent no one’s best here, although it’s nice to see Rhys Meyers back in action after some decidedly low-profile movie roles." Alistair Lawrence of Common Sense Media also awarded the film two stars out of five.
