= Oklahoma City Police Department =

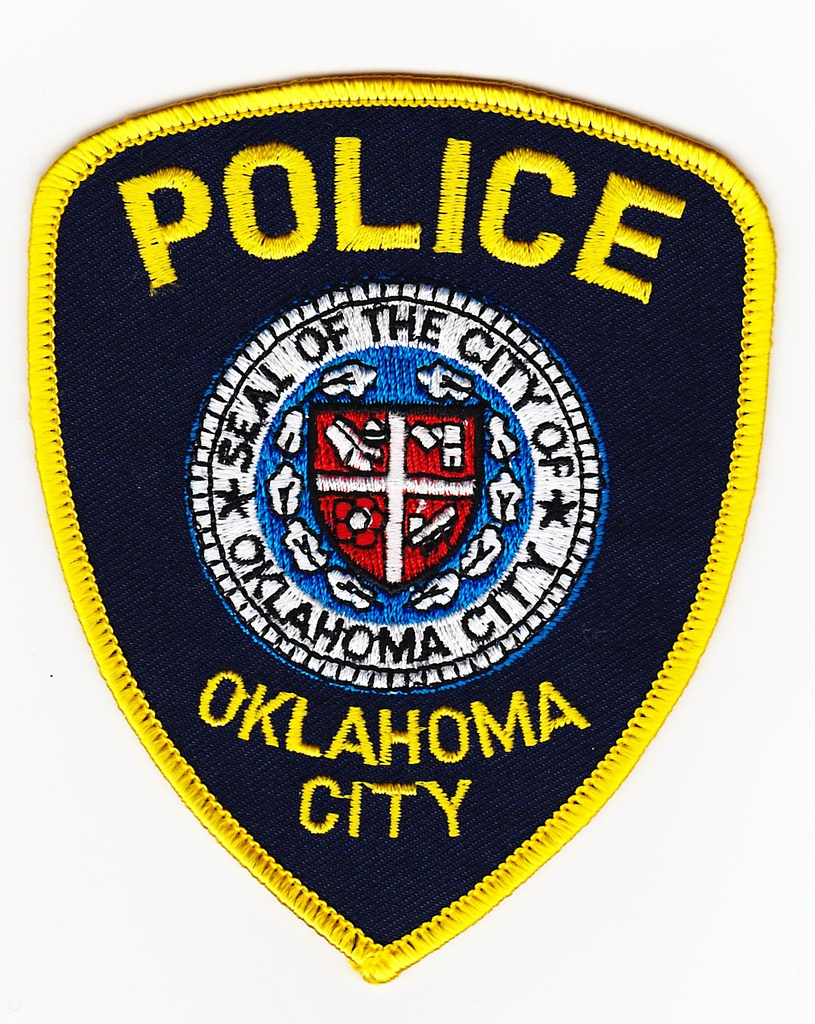
- Patch of OCPD

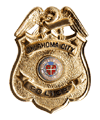
- Badge of OCPD

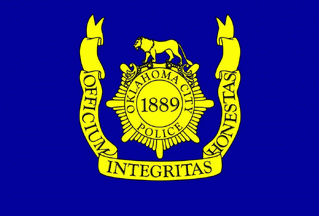
- Flag Of OCPD
- Abbreviation: OCPD or OKCPD
- Motto: Officium Integritas Honestas (English: "Duty, Integrity, Honor")

Agency overview
- Formed: 1889
- Employees: 1,382 (2020)
- Annual budget: $226 million (2021)

Jurisdictional structure
- Operations jurisdiction: Oklahoma City, Oklahoma, USA
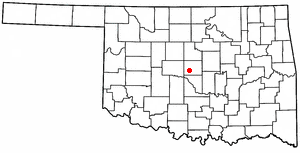
- Map of Oklahoma City Police Department's jurisdiction
- Area: 621.2 square miles (1,609 km^{2})
- Population: 649,410 (2018)
- Legal jurisdiction: State law and municipal ordnance
- General nature: Local civilian police

Operational structure
- Headquarters: Oklahoma City, Oklahoma
- Police Officers: 1,235
- Civilians: 300+
- Agency executive: Ron C. Bacy, Chief of Police

Facilities
- Stations: 10
- Airbases: 1
- Boats: 2
- Helicopters: 2
- German Shepherds: 9

Website
- www.ocpd.com

The Oklahoma City Police Department (OCPD) is the law enforcement agency with the primary police jurisdiction within the corporate limits of the City of Oklahoma City in the State of Oklahoma, United States of America. Established in 1889 following the Land Run, OCPD is the largest law enforcement agency and one of the oldest police departments in Oklahoma, tracing its roots back to Indian Territory.

== History ==
=== Formation ===
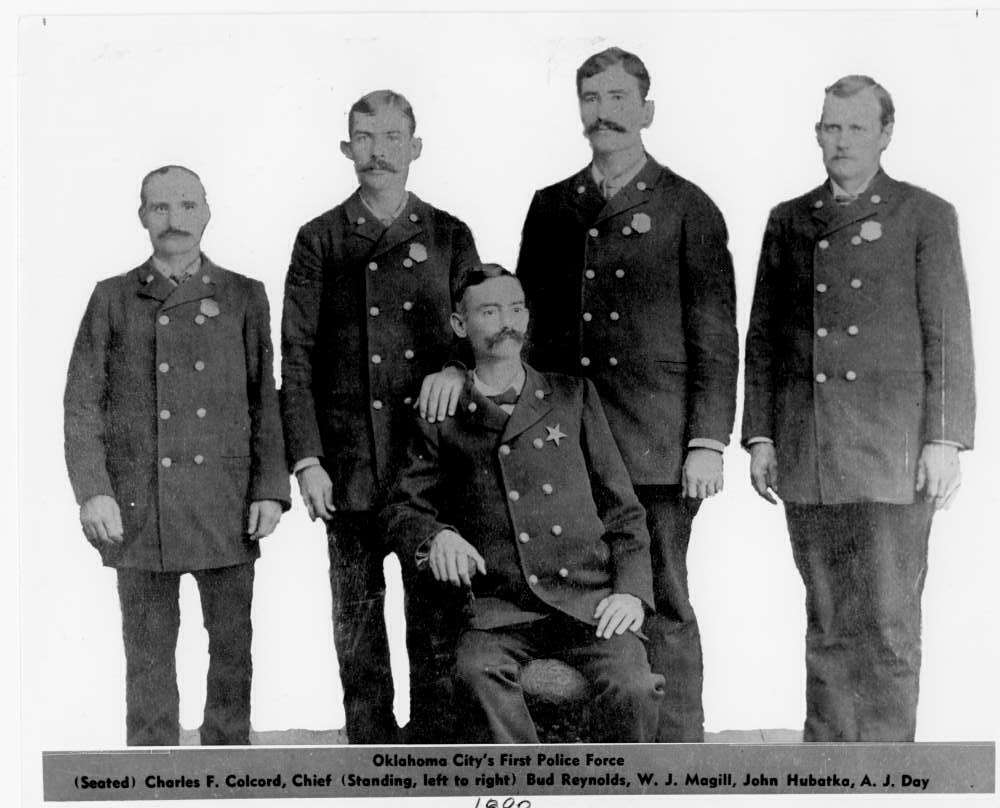
OCPD officers with Chief Charles F. Colcord

The Oklahoma City Police Department was officially formed following the Land Rush of 1889 in central Indian Territory. The department began as a small collection of officers. The department's first Chief was Charles F. Colcord and municipal court was held in a small tent near California Avenue. By the turn of the century, public drinking had caused many quality of life issues for the small community. In 1907, Oklahoma voters approved a liquor prohibition. A new City Charter was adopted early in March 1911. One of the Charter's provisions changed the office of the Chief of Police from elective to appointive. The charter also adopted a commissioner form of government. In July 1911, Mayor Whit M. Grant named Bill Tilghman as police chief. Tilghman had earned a reputation in the Western frontier having served as a U.S. Marshal, where tracked down outlaws like Bill Doolin. Under Tilghman's leadership, the OCPD rigorously targeted gambling, bootlegging, and prostitution rings.

=== World War I & Post War ===
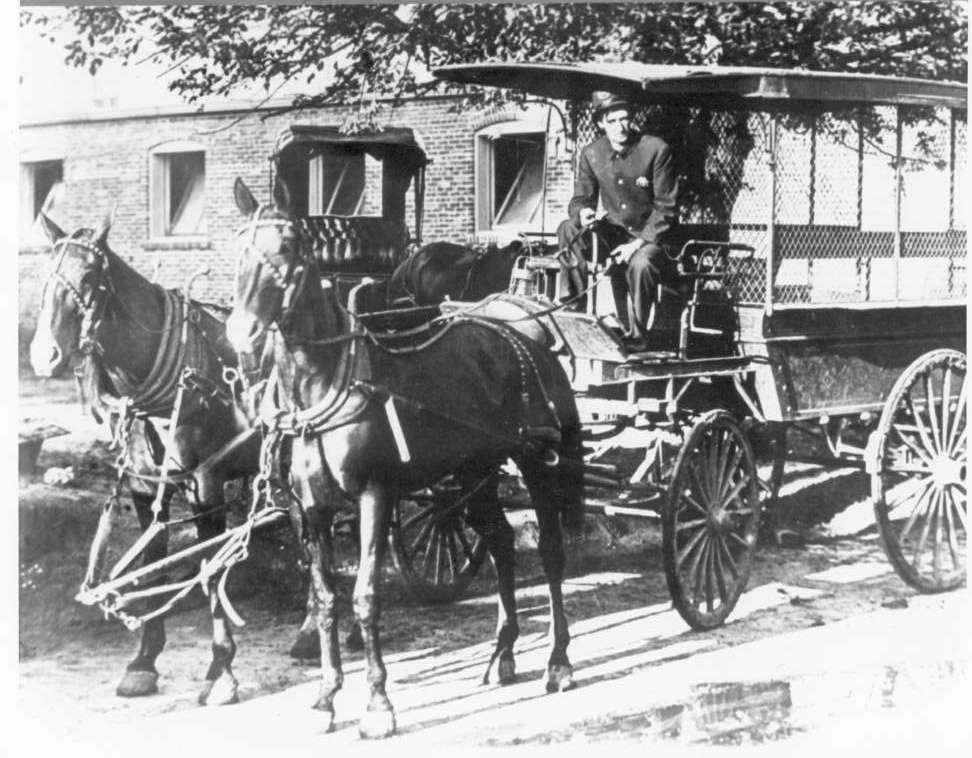
A horse-drawn OCPD Paddy wagon

During the war, the OCPD established a Traffic Department and motorcycle squad. The department also implemented an electric callbox system citywide. Officers walking a beat were required report with police dispatch by pushing "6-1" on the callbox. By 1923, the OCPD had expanded from 90 officers to 150. Additionally, the department created a mounted patrol unit, which began patrolling residential districts and directing traffic. In 1927, the city adopted a city manager form of government, in an effort to make city services non-partisan. In 1928, the OCPD created training courses for officers. Newly hired officers were required to complete the courses.

=== Great Depression era ===
America's gangster era ushered in a new paradigm for the OCPD. The crime wave of the Great Depression forced the OCPD to begin a transition from a loose collection of untrained men, towards a professionalized force. During the Thirties, nine officers were killed in the line of duty. The OCPD began created a "Radio Patrol Unit" and began installing mobile radios in police cars, which greatly improved the safety and efficiency of officers.

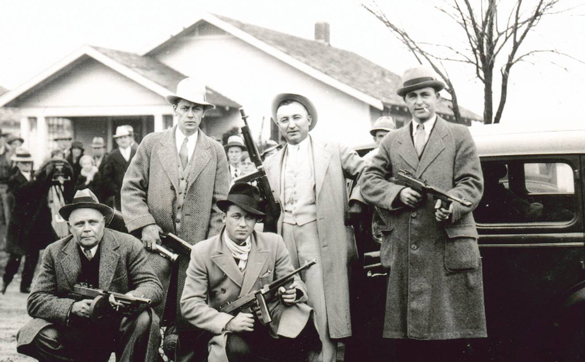
The OCPD Raiding Squad with shotguns and tommy guns. Front center is Detective "Jelly" Bryce.

Perhaps one of the department's most interesting lawmen emerged during this time. D.A. "Jelly" Bryce, joined the OCPD in 1928. Known for his dapper appearance, he earned the nickname "Jelly" from fellow officers. By the early 1930s, Bryce was promoted to the department's "Raiding Squad" as a plain clothes detective. In the unit, Bryce recovered dozens of stolen cars, and broke-up numerous bootlegging outfits and gambling rackets. Bryce was renown for his ability to track down outlaws and gangsters, most notably, Wilbur Underhill. Bryce often carried a shotgun and Thompson sub-machine gun while on duty. During his law enforcement career, Bryce was involved in 19 gun battles and killed at least 17 men. However, the exact number is unknown due to poor record keeping at the time. Bryce was known for his quick draw and was featured in LIFE magazine. He was electronically timed at two-fifths of a second to draw and accurately fire. It was reported at the time that "if a criminal blinked at Jelly Bryce, he would die in darkness." Bryce left the OCPD and later became an FBI Special Agent in Charge, before running unsuccessfully for Governor of Oklahoma.

=== World War II & Post War ===
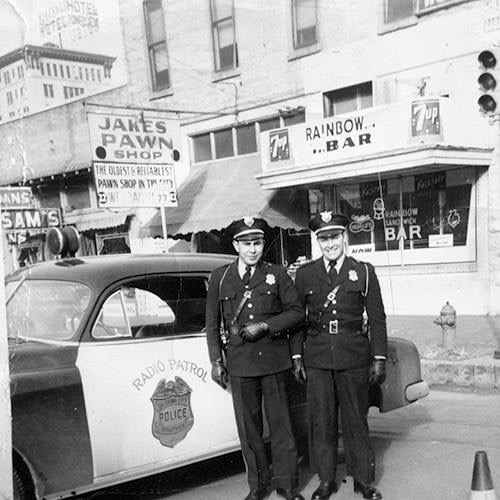
OCPD Radio Patrol "Scout Car"

Throughout the World War II, the department suffered from a severe shortage of manpower. As a result, the requirements to become a police officer were relaxed and many clerical positions were filled by civilians.

Following the war, the OCPD began a move towards specialization and professionalization. The department created a training unit. The unit conducted a 144-hour training course for new recruits. The department began new investigation units, such as burglary, traffic accident, white collar crime, and fingerprint collection.

=== 1960s ===
During the early 1960s, the OCPD established a K-9 unit, a forensics laboratory, and a police academy. In 1965, the OCPD headquarters building at 701 Colcord Avenue was completed. In 1969, the OCPD began issuing sidearms to officers. The department issued officers S&W Model 15 .38 Specials. In the years prior, officers had been required to purchase their own weapons.

=== 1970s ===
In the 1970s, the OCPD began the Alcohol Safety Action Project (ASAP) designed to reduce drunk driving. The department also created a Selective Enforcement Unit, designed to reduce crime in problematic areas. The OCPD also added a police helicopter and Tactical Team (SWAT). In 1972, Shirley (Cox) Conner, Sherry (Hamman) Garcia, Norma Jean (Bowerman) Adams, Julie (Black) Smith, and Gladys (Burns) Loflin became the first female police officers to be employed and assigned to uniformed patrol duties. In the fall of 1975, OCPD officers went on a work slowdown to protest low wages. On October 24, nearly all of the OCPD's 600 officers walked into City Hall and placed their badges on the city council's conference table. Over the next three days, the Oklahoma County Sheriff Office and the Oklahoma Highway Patrol provided police service to the city. Finally, on October 27, a settlement was reached, which resulted in a pay increase and added benefits for officers.

=== 1980s ===
In the 1980s the city's population rapid grew, and so did crime rates. The department implemented new equipment, such a mobile CSI unit, forensic training for patrol officers, and a field training program (FTO).

=== 1990s ===
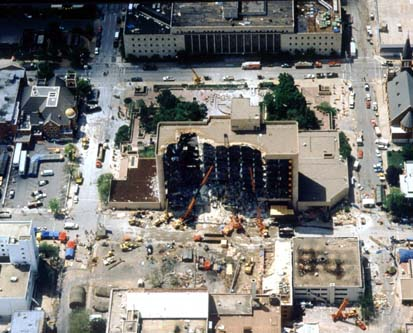
An aerial view of the destruction caused by the Oklahoma City bombing, looking from the north

On April 19, 1995 Timothy McVeigh carried out the Oklahoma City bombing, which was the worst terrorist attack in U.S. history. McVeigh detonated a Ryder truck bomb at the Alfred P. Murrah Federal Building which killed 168 people. Oklahoma City Police were the first on scene and began rescue efforts. Sgt. Detective Mike McPherson of the Auto Theft Unit and a Bomb Squad member arrived on scene moments after the blast. McPherson assisted the investigators by locating the hidden VIN number on the axle, which later allowed the FBI to tie the truck to McVeigh.

=== 21st Century ===
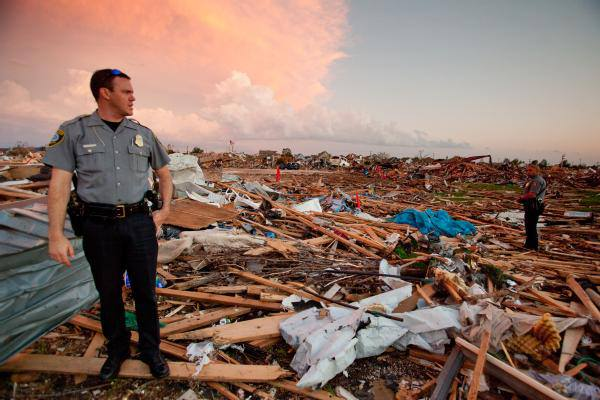
OCPD officers survey damage following the 2013 Moore tornado in southern Oklahoma City

In response to the tornado outbreaks, the OCPD changed its policy regarding tornado sirens. Tornado sirens are now activated in localized areas, instead of citywide activations.

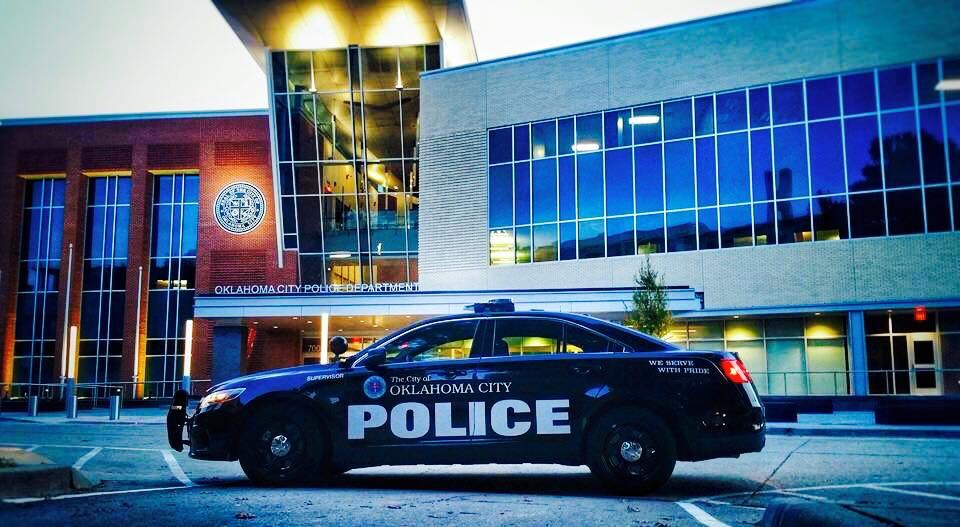
An OCPD car at the new headquarters building; the OCPD began transitioning from the Crown Victoria to the Ford Taurus as its standard patrol car starting in 2012

In the fall of 2015, the department opened a new headquarters building at 700 Colcord Drive. The new building cost approximately $22 million and has a floor area of more than 88,000 square feet. The building houses approximately 300 civilians, detectives, and administrators. In 2021, the previous police headquarters building at 701 Colcord Drive is being demolished.

In 2015, the OCPD announced plans to implement body cameras for patrol officers with an initial pilot program lasting a year, to be followed by wider adoption.

New recruits are issued the Heckler & Koch VP9 pistol chambered in 9×19mm Parabellum.

== Office of the Chief ==
The Chief's offices are located at the main police headquarters at 700 Colcord Dr on the west side of Downtown Oklahoma City.

The Chief's office oversees the operations of the Special Investigations Division (SID), Emergency Management Coordinator (EMC), Office of Media Relations, and the Office of Professional Standards. The Chief's office also has responsibility for finance and personnel oversight of the department and provides direction to the Oklahoma City division of the Fraternal Order of Police (FOP). Additionally, the office also includes a Police Chaplain's unit and the C.H.A.P.P.S. program, which assists officers in times of crisis or emotional distress.

== Rank structure ==
Rank	Insignia	Description
Chief of Police	or	Appointed as the Chief of Police of the department Responsible for overseeing department-wide operations
Deputy Chief		Holds the Position of Deputy Chief Of Police Responsible for overseeing operation, investigation and administration sections (There are 5 Deputy Chief's in the Department)
Major		Responsible for overseeing division wide operations
Captain		Responsible for overseeing shift-wide operations.
Lieutenant		First supervisory rank
Master Sergeant		Senior patrol title, denoting at least 15 years of service
Staff Sergeant		Title denoting at least 10 years of service
Sergeant		Title denoting at least 5 years of service
Detective		Title given to officers or sergeants assigned to investigations
Police Officer		Rank attained by recruits upon the completion of one year of probationary status
Probationary Officer		Title given to recruits after the completion of the Field Training Program
Recruit Officer		Rank attained after graduation from the police academy
Recruit		Title given to personnel while assigned as a student in the police academy

== Operations ==
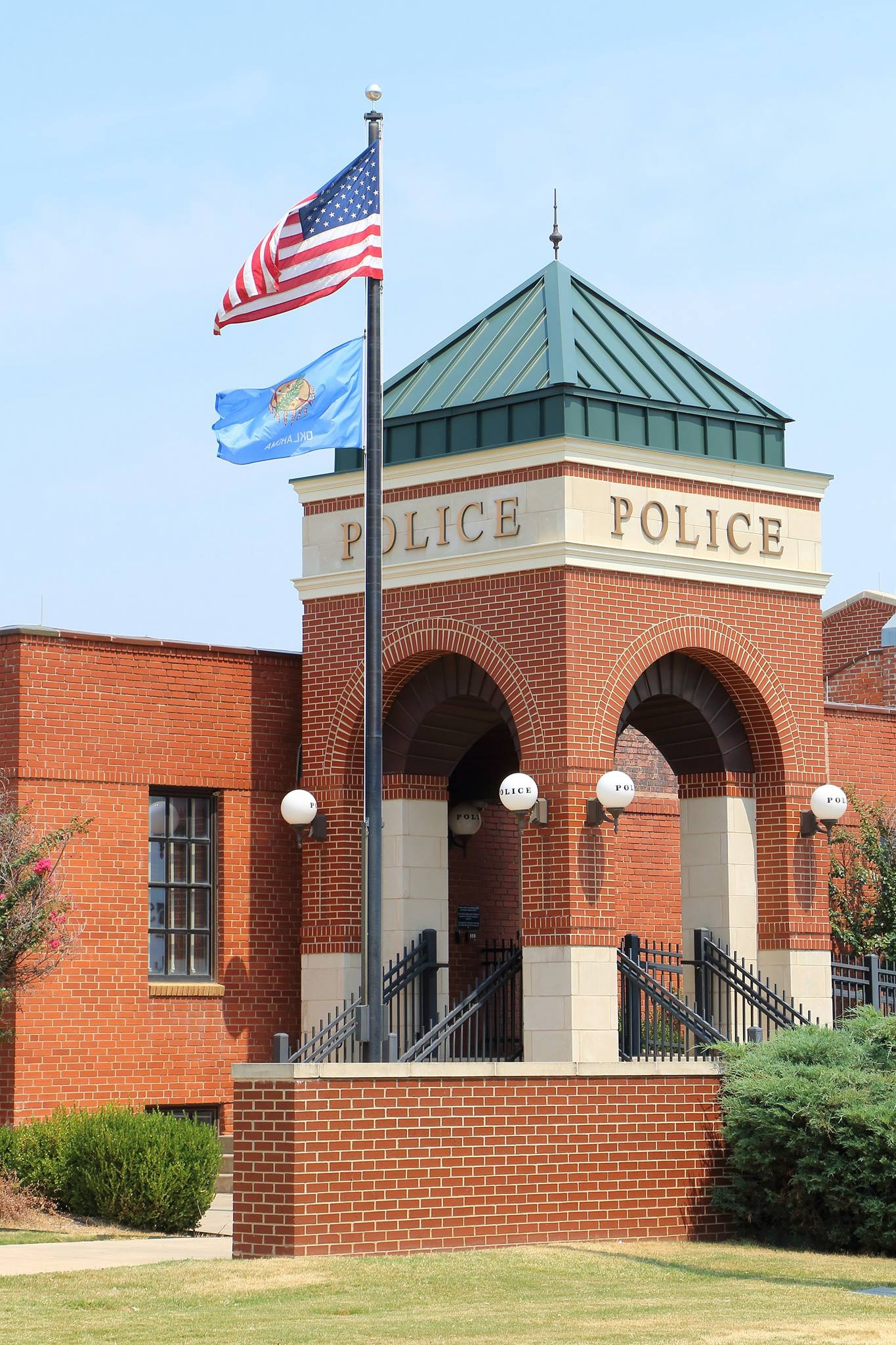
OCPD Bricktown Sub-division building

== Administration ==
The Administration Bureau provides administrative functions, such as training and recruiting, planning and research, and logistics support. it is located at police headquarters in downtown OKC. it also supervises the 9-1-1 emergency communications center, which is in downtown Oklahoma City. The facility was built in 2002 and is designed to withstand an EF5 tornado.

=== Operations ===
The Operations Bureau provides the bulk of the visible police operations that would be seen by the public. It includes the patrol divisions, as well as several specialized units such as the athletic league and a community relations unit.

There are four patrol divisions and one sub-division, which serve the various geographical areas of Oklahoma City:

- Hefner Division (Northwest Oklahoma City)
- Southwest Division (Southwest Oklahoma City)
- Santa Fe Division (Southeast Oklahoma City)
- Springlake Division (Northeast Oklahoma City)
  - Bricktown Sub-division (Bricktown and downtown Oklahoma City)

Specialized services which are part of the OCPD include the Tactical Team, K9, lake patrol, police aviation, bomb squad, counter-terrorism, criminal intelligence, anti-gang, narcotics, and airport police. The OCPD is accredited by the Commission on Accreditation for Law Enforcement Agencies.

The OCPD has a crime scene investigation service and full crime laboratory, as well as units which assist with electronic and computer crime investigations. In 2015, there were 1,169 sworn officers and 300 civilians employees serving in the department.

== Uniform support ==
The Uniform Support Division includes special units. These units assist patrol officers with specialized skills and equipment. Some of the units are part-time and officers are assigned elsewhere until needed.

== Awards ==
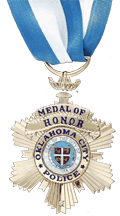
OCPD Medal of Honor, the department's highest award

The department presents a number of medals and ribbons to its members for honorable service. The medals that the OCPD awards to its officers are as follows:

- Police Medal of Honor – The highest award in the department. The medal is awarded for extraordinary act of bravely performed at tremendous personal risk to the officer.
- The Police Cross – The department's second highest award. The cross is awarded to the family member of a deceased officer.
- Medal of Valor – The third highest award. The medal is awarded to an officer for an exceptional act of bravery in the face of peril.
- Police Medal for Meritorious Service – The medal is awarded to an officer for excellent service performed in a distinguished fashion.

The department has awarded service ribbons commemorating the service officers who participated in the search and rescue efforts following the Oklahoma City bombing. The OCPD also awards officers a ribbon for life-saving action taken during the course of their duties.

== Line of duty deaths ==
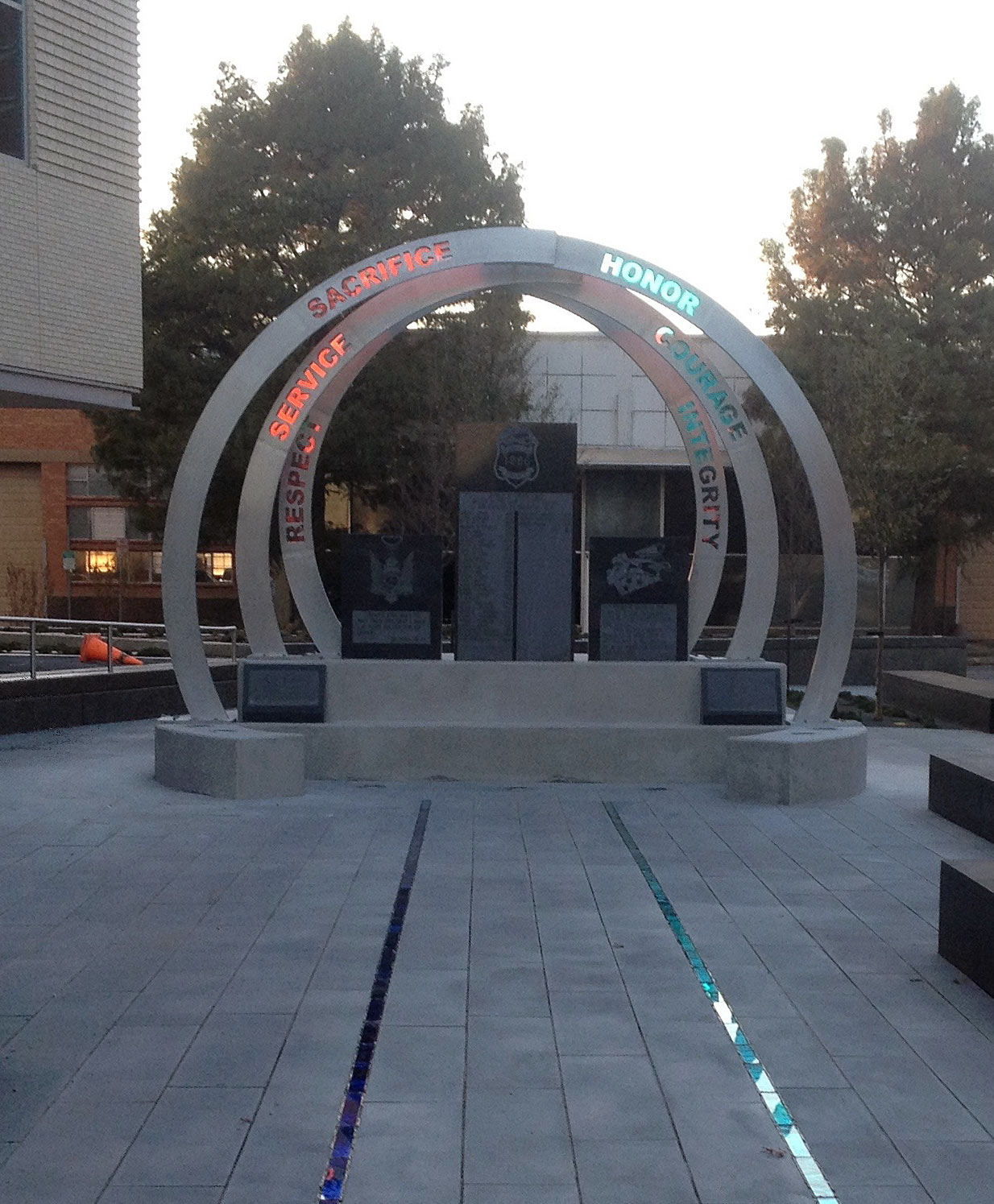
OCPD Fallen Officer Memorial

Since the establishment of the Oklahoma City Police Department, 31 officers and one recruit officer have died in the line of duty. There is a memorial to fallen OCPD officers at police headquarters.

In 2014, the department's second line-of-duty death of a K-9 occurred, when police dog "Kye" was stabbed to death by a man attempting to avoid police capture.

== Misconduct ==
=== History ===
The OCPD's public integrity unit traces its history to the earliest days of the department. During the World War I era, rules governing the conduct of officers were strict. Smoking while in uniform was strictly prohibited and officers were barred from working other jobs. A department rulebook from the time states, "All members of the Police Department shall be considered as ALWAYS on duty and the same responsibility for the suppression of disturbance and the arrest of offenders rests upon them when not in uniform as when on post of duty."

=== Office of Professional Standards ===
Allegations of misconduct are investigated by the OCPD's Office of Professional Standards (OPS). The office is composed of supervisors, who work in conjunction with specialized detective units to investigate claims of misconduct, including those both criminal or unprofessional in nature. Following an investigation by the Office of Professional Standards, a Citizen's Advisory Board, composed of 11 civilians from the community, reviews the allegations and the findings of the investigation. Following the review, the civilian board may submit recommendations to the chief of police or the city manager.

=== Body worn cameras ===
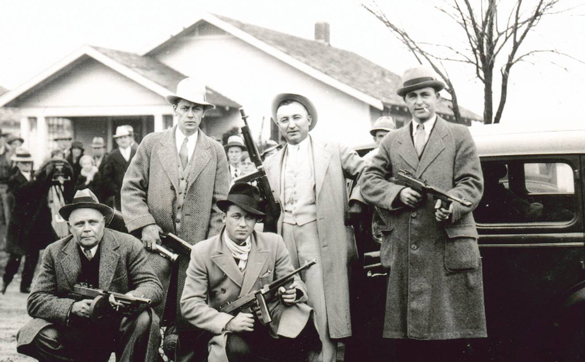
An OCPD raiding squad, led by famous lawman D.A. "Jelly" Bryce.

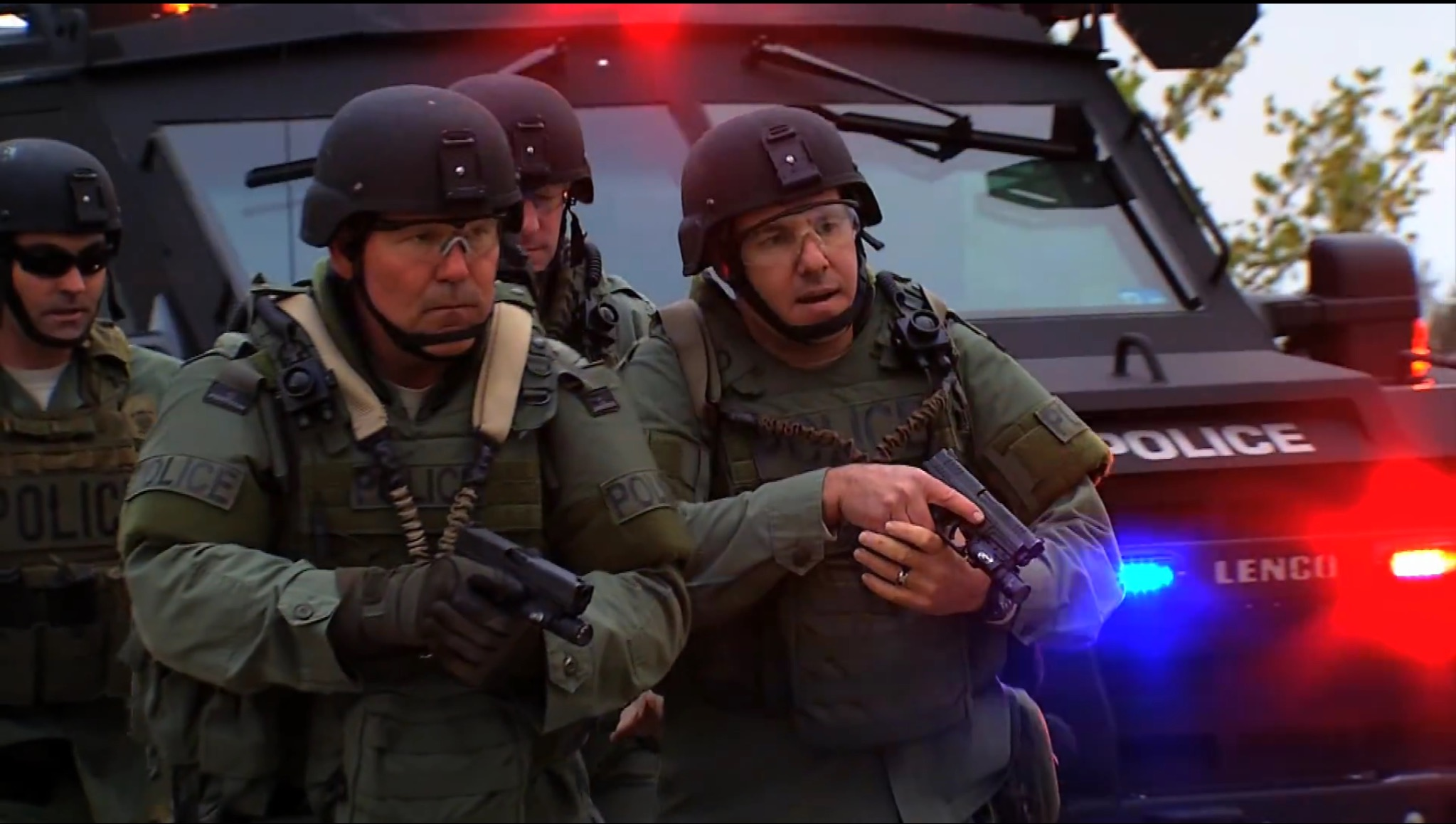
OCPD Tact Team deploying from a BearCat in a training exercise

In 2015, the department announced plans to implement body cameras for patrol officers with an initial pilot program lasting a year, to be followed by wider adoption. The pilot program started in January 2016, but the use of these cameras was suspended less than six months later due to labor disagreements between the department and the Oklahoma City Fraternal Order of Police. After negotiations resolved the labor dispute, the pilot program was restarted in November 2016. The department is committed to expanding camera use, and by February 2017 there were 345 cameras available for deployment. The initial program costs of Watch Guard camera system is reported to be $683,325. This cost does not include the additional personnel required to manage the program.

=== Scandals ===
In 1985, the department hired Joyce Gilchrist as a police chemist. In 1994 she was promoted to supervisor. She was fired in 2001 for "flawed casework analysis" and "laboratory mismanagement." She had testified in eleven cases that had resulted in executions and at least one that resulted in a four million dollar settlement by the city because of her faulty testimony.

In December 2010, the department agreed to formally apologize and pay $30,000 to a woman who was mistakenly arrested in front of her grandchildren in 2009, after her name was incorrectly entered into a database by a police clerk.

In July 2011, Oklahoma City police arrested about twenty children who were waiting outside a movie theatre after the movie ended. They were initially charged with curfew violations, although the arrests happened twenty minutes before the 11:00PM deadline. Police Chief Bill Citty admitted the officers involved made a mistake.

In March 2012, Officer Roland Benavides was convicted of gambling offenses and given a five-year deferred sentence. He had resigned from the force the preceding January, after he was caught.

In August 2012, Sergeant Maurice Martinez pleaded guilty to 12 counts of sexual abuse of foster children in his care.

In December 2015, Officer Daniel Holtzclaw was convicted of 18 charges of rape or sexually assault against multiple women (ranging in age from 17 to 57) on his patrol route. He was also found not guilty on 18 charges. Investigations showed that Holtzclaw had run background checks on some of his victims, targeting women with criminal records. Holtzclaw was fired from the department before the trial began in January, and after the guilty verdict was returned, Police Chief Citty issued a statement that "we are satisfied with the jury's decision and firmly believe justice was served". The conviction is controversial. Michelle Malkin argues that Holtzclaw was wrongfully convicted in the case, which she calls a "monstrous miscarriage of justice."

On November 15, 2017, Sgt. Keith Sweeney responded to a call with an emotionally disturbed person, Dustin Pigeon, who was threatening to light himself on fire. Pigeon was holding a bottle of lighter fluid and a lighter. Sweeney, who was the third officer to arrive at the call, has been criticized for escalating the interaction, which eventually resulted in Sweeney shooting and killing Pigeon. After reviewing the incident, Oklahoma County District Attorney David Prater filed 2nd Degree Murder charges against Sweeney. In an August 2018 preliminary hearing, Oklahoma County Special Judge Kathryn Savage found enough evidence to bind Sweeney for trial. Sweeney was subsequently convicted and sentenced to ten years in state prison.

As part of a statewide effort to identify over 7,000 untested sexual assault evidence kits, in mid-2019 the Oklahoma State Bureau of Investigation reported that the department had more than 1,500 untested rape kits in storage. In 2018, prior to the state's report, the police department had adopted a policy that every kit be screened by the police department's DNA laboratory and by September 2021 the city's backlog was eliminated.

In March 2023 a police captain was pulled over for drunk driving off-duty and in the process repeatedly asked the officer to turn off his body camera. The officer refused and arrested the police captain, who was suspended from his position during an investigation and is no longer employed by the city.

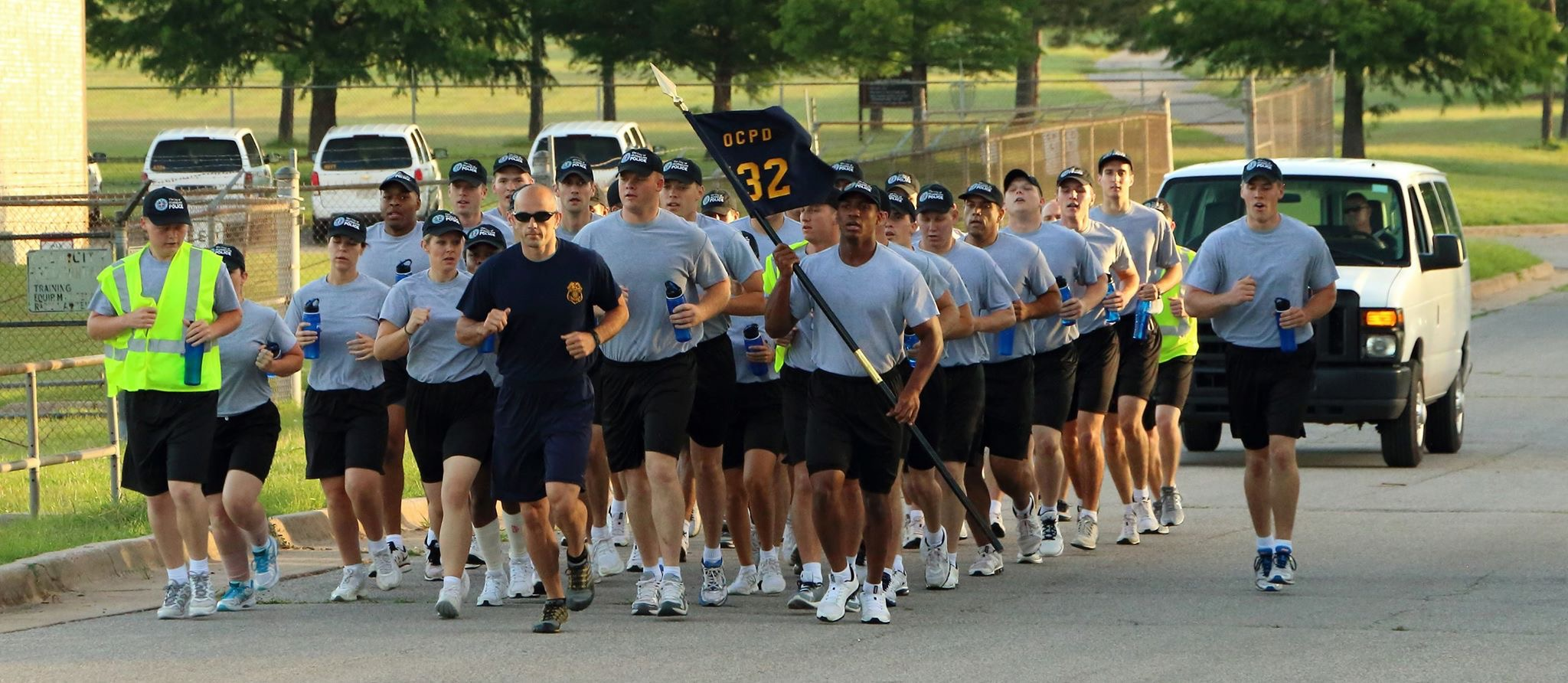
OCPD Academy Recruits on a morning jog

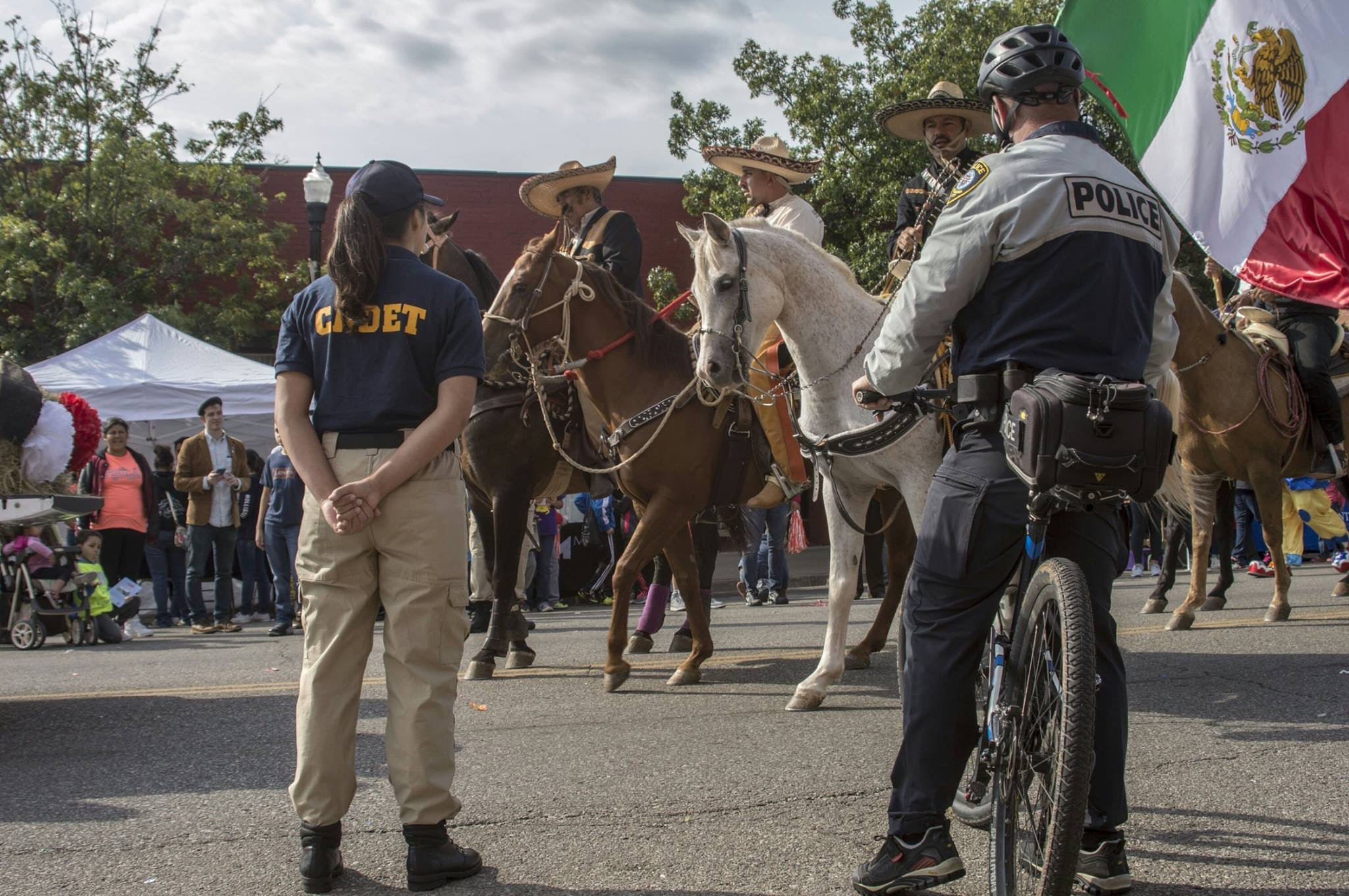
An OCPD Cadet with a Bike Patrol Officer at a special event

== Training ==
=== Police Academy ===
Applicants who are accepted into OCPD Police Academy begin their employment as a "Police Recruit" at the OCPD Training Center at 800 North Portland Avenue. The OKCPD police academy lasts 28 weeks and is mostly a non-residential academy. Recruits are paid employees while attending the academy.

=== Field Training Program ===
The OCPD Field training program (FTO) is modeled after the San Jose system. The program requires graduates of the police academy to complete a four- to six-month-long training phase in the field with at least three different training officers. During the FTO program, Recruit Officers are graded daily on more than 30 different categories ranging from personal safety to interactions with citizens. Officers must have acceptable scores to continue through the program.

=== Cadet Program ===
In 2015, the OCPD entered into an official partnership with the OKC Metro Tech. The partnership created an "OCPD Cadet Academy." The program is designed to prepare high school students for careers in public safety or law enforcement. Students are introduced to the basics of law enforcement, such as defensive tactics, forensic investigations, and criminal law. In addition, cadets receive training in emergency vehicle driving and weapons. The goal of the program is to groom high school students for the OCPD Police Academy.

== Vehicles and aircraft ==
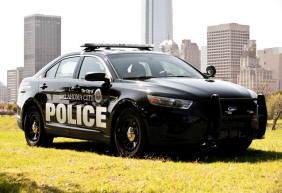
2013 OCPD Ford Police Interceptor Sedan

=== Vehicles ===
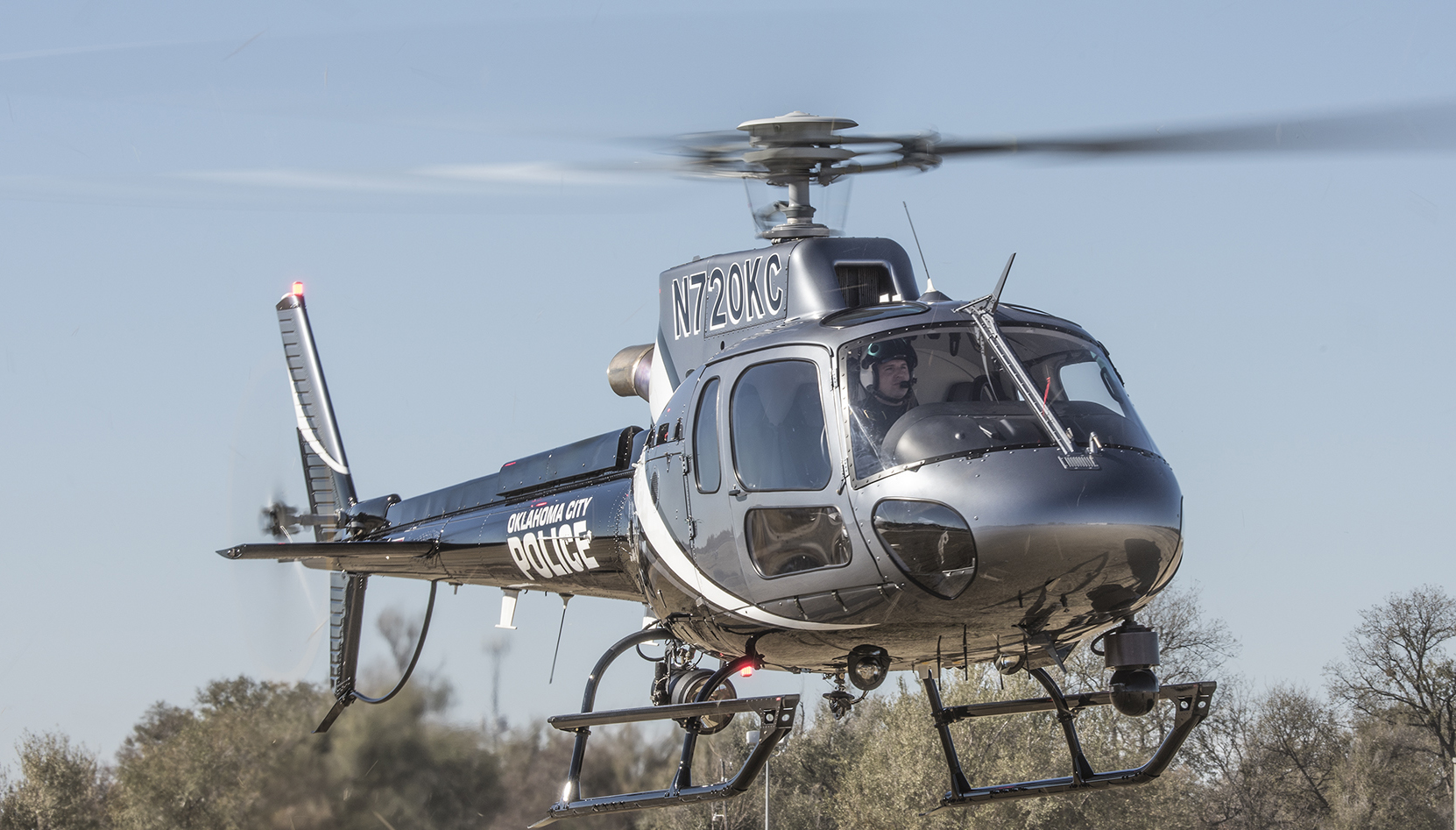
OCPD Air-One on short final at the department's downtown helipad

Police vehicles used by OCPD include the Crown Victoria Police Interceptor, Ford Police Interceptor Sedan, Ford Police Interceptor Utility, Ford F-250, Ford Ranger, Chevrolet Impala, Chevrolet Tahoe, and the Lenco BearCat used by the Tactical Team. The departments also uses several types of boats for lake patrol and BMW RT-P motorcycles for traffic enforcement.

In 2012, OCPD began transitioning to the Ford Police Interceptor Sedan and Ford Police Interceptor Utility for patrol officers. In appearance, the vehicles are all black. The word "POLICE" is printed in large white letters on the side doors, and "We Serve With Pride" appears above the rear wheel wells. The seal of the City of Oklahoma City appears on the front doors. An abbreviation denoting the division that the vehicle is assigned to appears on the rear trunk (HF-Hefner, SW-Southwest, SF-Santa Fe, SL-Springlake, BT-Bricktown, WRWA-Will Rogers World Airport, US-Uniform Support, BP-Bike Patrol, VCAT-Violent Crime Apprehension Team). Also printed on the rear trunk area is the car number with the word "POLICE" in small white letters.

=== Aircraft ===
In 2014, the department began using two Eurocopter AS350 Écureuil helicopters. The helicopters are stationed at the department's helipad at the Southwest Division. The helicopters are equipped with Forward looking infrared cameras and searchlights. When in flight, the helicopters use the FAA callsign Air-One or Air-Two to communicate with Oklahoma City Air Traffic Control. Prior to 2014, the OCPD operated a pair of MD 500E helicopters as its air-support assets.

== Firearms ==
In 1990 the department abandoned the S&W Model 65 revolver and began issuing the Glock 17 9mm pistol. The Glock pistol remained the primary issue sidearm of the department until 2017, when the department selected the SIG Sauer P320 chambered in 9mm. In 2023 the agency again changed the issue sidearm, this time selecting the Heckler Koch VP9 pistol in 9mm. Officers are issued and complete their academy training and probation with their issued sidearm. After completing their new hire probation officers may select another firearm from an approved list, but must purchase the gun and supporting equipment at their own expense.

In 2007 the department implemented a patrol rifle program. Officers are selected for the department's patrol rifle school, and upon successful completion are issued an AR-15. The department initially issued rifles from Rock River Arms, and later adopted SIG Sauer AR platform rifles in a short barrel format. The department also has Remington Model 870 shotguns that are issued at officer request.

The OCPD Tactical Team uses a range of specialized weapons, including the AR-15 and Heckler & Koch G36K assault rifle, as well as the Heckler & Koch MP5 submachine gun and custom made precision rifles from Surgeon Rifles.

In the past the department allowed a variety of weapons, and during Prohibition, some officers carried Thompson submachine guns. The department still maintains some of the historic Thompson guns in its inventory.
