= Joyce Gilchrist =

American forensic chemist

Joyce Gilchrist (January 11, 1948 – June 14, 2015) was an American forensic chemist who was accused of falsifying evidence in order to help prosecutors in Oklahoma. She participated in more than 3,000 criminal cases in 21 years while working for the Oklahoma City Police Department. Her evidence led in part to 23 people being sentenced to death, 12 of whom have been executed. After her dismissal, Gilchrist alleged that she was fired in retaliation for reporting sexual misconduct.

== Biography ==
Joyce Gilchrist began working at the Oklahoma City PD crime laboratory in 1980. Gilchrist earned the nickname "Black Magic" for her ability to match DNA evidence that other forensic examiners could not. She was also known for being unusually adept at testifying and persuading juries, thus obtaining convictions. In 1994, Gilchrist was promoted to supervisor from forensic chemist after just nine years on the job, but her colleagues began to raise concerns about her work.

Concerns about Gilchrist's actions were first raised when a landscaper, Jeffrey Todd Pierce, who had been convicted of rape in 1986 largely based on Gilchrist's evidence despite a clean criminal record and good alibi, was exonerated based on additional DNA evidence.

Pierce, a husband and the father of two infant children, was misidentified in a police line-up. After voluntarily giving hair and blood samples to the police investigators in an attempt to clear his name, he was arrested and charged with the rape. Gilchrist claimed his hair samples were "microscopically consistent" with the hairs found at the crime scene. Pierce was cleared of the crime in 2001 after DNA evidence was re-examined, and released after 15 years in prison. Pierce subsequently filed a lawsuit against Oklahoma City, seeking $75 million and charging that Gilchrist and Bob Macy, a district attorney, conspired to produce false evidence against him. The suit was settled for $4 million in 2007, with one Oklahoma City councilman noting that the city could have had to pay much more.

== Dismissal ==
Gilchrist was dismissed in September 2001 due to "flawed casework analysis" and "laboratory mismanagement". An FBI investigation in 2001 concluded that Gilchrist offered testimony:“that went beyond the acceptable limits of science.”

Robert (Bob) Macy, District Attorney from 1980 until 2001 for Oklahoma County and the State's capital, Oklahoma City, has been accused of conspiring with Gilchrist on 23 of Macy's 54 death row convictions. David Autry, an Oklahoma County public defender who worked during the Macy era stated :“He would routinely withhold exculpatory evidence, he engaged in prosecutorial misconduct routinely during trials and especially during closing argument. And even when the appellate court would slap him down, he would just continue on the same course.”

She consistently denied any wrongdoing and was never charged with any crime.

== Aftermath ==
Other cases from individuals convicted on Gilchrist's testimony continue to work their way through the courts.

- Michael Blair was sentenced to death for the murder of a young girl in 1993. The evidence leading to his conviction included shafts of hair found near the girl's body and in Blair's car. New DNA evidence showed that the hair matched neither the girl, nor Blair.
- During the early 1990s, Oklahoma state law did not allow defense attorneys to use government funds to hire other forensic scientists to verify Gilchrist's claims. However, during appeals of Malcolm Rent Johnson's death penalty case, two forensic experts hired by the defense were critical of Gilchrist's testimony, particularly as it relied upon several "blue-colored hairs" that seemed too "ubiquitous" to be useful evidence.
- Curtis McCarty was released in 2007 after spending nearly 20 years on death row. Gilchrist initially excluded McCarty as a suspect based on microsopic hair analysis however at his trial she testified that the hairs were microscopically "in every respect" consistent with hair samples from Mc Carty. The courts found that Gilchrist acted to either alter or intentionally lose evidence. McCarty sued Gilchrist for her wrongdoing, but his case was thrown out on technical terms, like those of most exonerees.
- In June 2018, Johnny Edward Tallbear was released after 26 years in jail for a murder he did not commit. Gilchrist testified under oath that Tallbear's blood matched that found at the scene of the crime. DNA testing showed this to be incorrect.

Over 1,700 cases in which Gilchrist's evidence was significant to conviction were reviewed by the State of Oklahoma. Gilchrist's attorney stated that, "The criticism of [Joyce Gilchrist] around here is second only to that of Timothy McVeigh." After her dismissal, Gilchrist filed a lawsuit seeking $20.1 million, claiming that her firing was actually motivated by revenge, after she reported sexual misconduct by her supervisor.

The 12th-season Law & Order episode "Myth of Fingerprints" was inspired by Gilchrist's case.

== Death ==
After her dismissal, Gilchrist relocated to Houston, where she worked for a candle-making company. She died in Texas on June 14, 2015.

== See also ==
- Annie Dookhan, chemist who admitted to falsifying evidence
- Fred Zain, lab technician found guilty of falsifying serology evidence
- Hair analysis, forensic method used by Gilchrist
