= Matthew John Lawrence =

American director, producer, and writer

Matthew John Lawrence is an American writer, director, producer, and editor known for his films Uncle Peckerhead and Bloody Axe Wound.

== Biography ==
Lawrence attended Boston University, where he earned a MFA in Film Production. He is from Toms River, New Jersey, and currently lives in Philadelphia, Pennsylvania.

Aside from his film work, Lawrence also works as an Associate Professor of Communication Studies at The College of New Jersey.

== Filmography ==
| Year | Film | Director | Producer | Editor | Notes |
|---|---|---|---|---|---|
| 2007 | Stripper Cake | Yes | Yes | Yes | Short film |
| 2009 | Shoebox Redhead | Yes | Yes | Yes | Short film |
| 2010 | Enter the Beard | Yes | Yes | Yes | Short film |
| 2014 | Two Pints Lighter | Yes | Yes | Yes | Short film |
| 2015 | Larry Gone Demon | Yes | Yes | Yes | Short film |
| 2015 | A Good Fish | No | Yes | No | Short film |
| 2016 | Break | No | Yes | No | Short film |
| 2017 | I Am Your Friend | No | Yes | No | Short film |
| 2017 | Holiday Fear | No | Yes | No | Short film |
| 2018 | Mother Fucker | No | Yes | No | Short film |
| 2020 | Uncle Peckerhead | Yes | Yes | Yes | Feature film |
| 2020 | Follicles | Yes | Yes | Yes | Music video |
| 2024 | Bloody Axe Wound | Yes | No | Yes | Feature film |
