= Fred Zain =

American forensic scientist (1951–2002)

Frederick Salem Zain (April 14, 1951 – December 2, 2002) was an American forensic laboratory technician in West Virginia and Bexar County, Texas, who falsified serology results to obtain convictions.

== Background ==
In 1977, Zain was hired as a chemist of the West Virginia State Police crime laboratory, with the rank of trooper. He was eventually promoted to director of the serology department of the state Department of Public Safety–- the official name of the State Police until 1995.

It was established later that Zain used false credentials to get hired by the state police crime lab. He claimed to have graduated from West Virginia State College (now West Virginia State University) with a major in biology and a minor in chemistry. He had indeed majored in biology, having graduated with a C average. He had never minored in chemistry, but had taken a few chemistry courses, all of which he either failed or barely passed. He had also failed an FBI course in forensic science. Nonetheless, no one checked his background.

Zain soon gained a reputation among West Virginia prosecuting attorneys for being able to solve extremely difficult cases. His reputation was such that prosecutors throughout the country wanted to use him as an expert witness.

There were a number of red flags around Zain, but his supervisors chose to ignore them. In 1985, FBI Laboratory director James Greer told the West Virginia State Police that Zain had failed basic courses in serology and testing bloodstains. No corrective action was taken. Later that year, two workers claimed to have seen Zain's record results from blank test plates. However, these complaints were not taken seriously because it was well known the workers and Zain didn't like each other. Zain also gained a reputation for being very "pro-prosecution."

In 1989, Zain became chief of physical evidence at the Bexar County Medical Examiner's Office. However, West Virginia prosecutors continued to call upon him because his results appeared to be more favorable than others.

== West Virginia work discredited ==
In 1987, Glen Woodall was convicted of a series of grisly felonies at the Huntington Mall, including two cases of sexual assault, principally on Zain's testimony regarding semen from one of the victims. Woodall was sentenced to 335 years in prison. However, in 1988, DNA testing proved conclusively that Woodall was innocent, and the conviction was reversed. Woodall's defense team performed its own tests, which determined that Zain had used flawed blood-typing methods in tying the semen to Woodall. More seriously, it seemed that Zain had initially determined a piece of hair was unidentifiable pubic hair, but later changed his identification to hair from Woodall's beard. On that basis, Woodall was freed in 1992. Woodall subsequently sued the state for false imprisonment and won a $1 million settlement.

At the request of the West Virginia State Police, Kanawha County Prosecutor William Forbes began a criminal investigation. Forbes was so disturbed by what he found that he asked the Supreme Court of Appeals of West Virginia to appoint a special judge and a panel of lawyers and scientists to investigate the serology department. On November 4, 1993, Senior Circuit Court Judge James Holliday issued a report finding that Zain had engaged in a staggering litany of misconduct and outright fraud. According to the report, Zain had misstated evidence, falsified laboratory results and reported scientifically implausible results that may have resulted in as many as 134 people being wrongfully convicted. Holliday concluded that Zain's misconduct was so egregious that any testimony offered by Zain should be presumed as prima facie "invalid, unreliable, and inadmissible". He also found serious deficiencies in the serology division's quality-control procedures. The Supreme Court unanimously accepted Holliday's report on November 12, terming Zain's actions "egregious violations of the right of a defendant to a fair trial" and a "corruption of our legal system".

== Further investigation ==
An investigation in Texas found that while working with the Bexar County Medical Examiner's Office, Zain had engaged in misconduct and fraud that may have resulted in as many as 180 wrongful convictions. As in West Virginia, the Texas investigation found numerous instances of Zain filing reports on tests that had never even been done, reporting negative results as positive, and describing inconclusive results as conclusive. Bexar County dismissed him after learning of his misconduct in West Virginia. Reviews of the cases he had processed resulted in charges being dismissed and convictions reversed for multiple cases in West Virginia and Texas. West Virginia alone eventually paid a combined total of $6.5 million to settle lawsuits by people who had been convicted wrongfully due to Zain.

Zain was charged with fraud, but his trial was delayed indefinitely after he was diagnosed with liver cancer. In 2001, he was charged with four counts of obtaining money by false pretenses, but the jury deadlocked. A new fraud trial was later scheduled for July 2003. In December 2002, Zain succumbed to his liver cancer and died in his home in Ormond Beach, Florida.

Fallout from Zain's malfeasance continued for several years. In 2016, for instance, former minor league baseball player Jimmie Gardner had his 1987 sexual assault conviction thrown out on appeal after contending Zain misrepresented the evidence against him. In 2019, he reached a $175,000 settlement with the city of Charleston.

== See also ==
- List of wrongful convictions in the United States
- List of miscarriage of justice cases
- Joyce Gilchrist - a chemist who falsified evidence
- Annie Dookhan - a chemist who falsified evidence
