= Heads Will Roll (podcast) =

Fantasy podcast

Heads Will Roll is a fantasy podcast produced by Audible and Broadway Video and starring Kate McKinnon and her sister Emily Lynne.

== Background ==
The show is a 10 episode scripted comedy and fantasy podcast that debuted on May 2, 2019. A second season with additional episodes was released on June 6, 2026 under the name Heads Will Roll: Heir Apparent. The show was produced by Audible and Broadway Video. Most of the cast is made up of Saturday Night Live alumni. The show is "halfway between an audiobook and a podcast". The show stars Kate McKinnon and her sister Emily Lynne. The cast includes Peter Dinklage. The show also features songs performed by Audra McDonald. AudioFile Magazine speculated whether the show might have a sequel. The role of the evil queen was inspired by one of Vanessa Redgrave's roles.

== Synopsis ==
The show centers upon Queen Mortuana, a self-centered evil queen and her raven sidekick, JoJo as they try to navigate relationships, ennui, and fame amidst a peasant uprising. As the series progresses Mortuana confesses that she never wanted to become an evil queen while JoJo continuously seeks for a way to break the curse that leaves her in the form of a raven. The series ends with JoJo sacrificing her chance at becoming human once again in order to save Mortuana from being put to death by peasants. For her part, Mortuana willingly giving up the throne to become a candlemaker. The two settle in to live together in a humble cottage, only for them to quickly succumb to tedium as Mortuana vows to regain her throne and JoJo will once again seek out a way to break her curse.

== Cast and characters ==
- Aidy Bryant
- Alex Moffat
- Andrea Martin
- Antoni Porowski
- Audra McDonald
- Bob the Drag Queen
- Bobby Berk
- Carol Kane
- Chris Redd
- Emily Lynne as JoJo
- Esther Perel
- Heidi Gardner
- Jonathan Van Ness
- Karamo Brown
- Kate McKinnon as Queen Mortuana
- Meryl Streep
- Peter Dinklage
- Steve Higgins
- Tan France
- Tim Gunn

== Reception ==
Audiofile called the podcast "Smart, snarky, and silly" while also praising the acting of Carol Kane. AfterEllen's review was also favorable, stating that it was "highly digestible" and highlighting McKinnon's performance.
