= Rogue Hostage =

2021 American action thriller film by Jon Keeyes

- Directed by: Jon Keeyes
- Written by: Mickey Solis
- Produced by: Tyrese Gibson; Jon Keeyes; Jordan Yale Levine; Jordan Beckerman; Ford Austin
- Starring: Tyrese Gibson; John Malkovich; Michael Jai White; Christopher Backus
- Edited by: Alan Canant
- Music by: Ben Weinman
- Production companies: Yale Productions; Highland Myst Entertainment
- Distributed by: Vertical Entertainment; Redbox Entertainment
- Release date: June 11, 2021 (United States)
- Running time: 93 minutes
- Country: United States
- Language: English

Rogue Hostage is a 2021 American action thriller film directed by Jon Keeyes starring Tyrese Gibson with John Malkovich, Michael Jai White and Christopher Backus. It was released in the United States on June 11, 2021, by Vertical Entertainment and Redbox Entertainment.

== Plot ==
The film is set in a rural U.S. state. Former Marine Kyle Snowden wakes up from a battlefield flashback nightmare. Snowden left the military after a frightening incident and works in Child Protective Services. He now lives with his young daughter, Angel, after his wife left them both.

A rogue group of mercenaries plans to attack Congressman Sam Nelson. The leader of the group, Eagan Raize, hates the Congressman. Eagan's father, Luther, was Nelson’s business partner and was sent to jail for eighteen years in a fraud case. Eagan believes that Nelson ruined his father’s life to take over the business. Sam Nelson is Kyle’s stepfather.

After an accidental shooting on the battlefield, Kyle Snowden's remorse was heavy and his sanity deteriorated. Following that incident, in which he unintentionally shot and killed his partner, he was unable to pick up a gun again.

Eagan attacks Nelson's store by planting a bomb while Kyle, Angel, and many others are in the store, taking them hostage. Kyle is reluctantly required to take up arms again. Eagan had planned to destroy Nelson and set an example for the town, but he ends up stealing money from the store and taking Sunshine at gunpoint because he is infatuated with her. After the murder of Kyle’s companion, Clove from Child Protective Services, a Spanish boy, Manny, becomes Kyle’s responsibility. Overcoming his fear, Kyle raids the store and saves the day.

Nelson tries to convince the police that it was a planned robbery and not an act of terrorism, planned in order to claim insurance money. However, his efforts are futile, when Mikki steals Nelson's money for herself and Sunshine. Kyle plans to request temporary custody of Manny from the court. Kyle and Nelson make peace at the end.

== Cast ==
- Tyrese Gibson as Kyle Snowden
- John Malkovich as Congressman Sam Nelson
- Michael Jai White as Sparks
- Christopher Backus as Eagan Raize
- Holly Taylor as Mikki
- Luna Lauren Velez as Sunshine
- Carlos Sanchez as Manny
- Brandi Bravo as Clove Martinez
- Zani Jones Mbayise as Angel Snowden
- Charlie Sara as Shane

== Production ==
The film was originally titled Red 48. Filming wrapped in September 2020.

== Reception ==
The film has a 0% rating on Rotten Tomatoes based on ten reviews.

Leslie Felperin of The Guardian awarded the film two stars out of five and wrote, "The whole shooting match is pretty bloody, and as cheesy as the dairy aisle, but decent fun to watch."

Jeffrey Anderson of Common Sense Media also awarded the film two stars out of five.
