= Jon Keeyes =

American film director

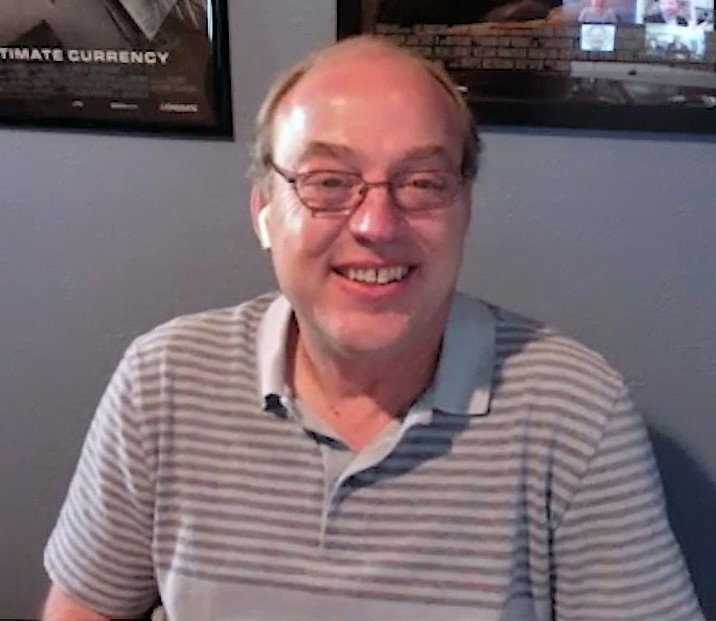
- Keeyes discusses his film The Survivalist in 2021.
- Born: April 5, 1969 (age 57); Fullerton, CA
- Occupations: Director, producer, writer
- Years active: 2000 - present

Jon Keeyes (born April 5, 1969) is an American film director, producer and screenwriter. He began his career as an entertainment journalist before moving into filmmaking. His first movie, American Nightmare, became a cult hit and has never been out of distribution. In 2015, he began to put more of an emphasis on producing, and since 2020 has maintained an equal balance of producing notable feature films and directing actors such as John Malkovich and Antonio Banderas He is a co-founder and principal of the independent film company Highland Myst Entertainment.

== Filmography ==
Year	Title	Director	Writer	Producer
2002	American Nightmare	Yes	Yes	Yes
2003	Hallow’s End	Yes	No	Yes
2004	Suburban Nightmare	Yes	Yes	Yes
2005	Equilateral	Yes	No	Yes
2007	Mad Bad	Yes	No	No
2007	Living & Dying	Yes	Yes	Yes
2009	Angela's Body (short)	Yes	Yes	Yes
2009	Fall Down Dead	Yes	No	Yes
2009	Billy Mean Pipes (short)	Yes	No	No
2009	Butterscotch (short)	Yes	No	No
2012	Phobia	Yes	No	No
2012	The Mechanical Grave (short)	Yes	Yes	Yes
2014	Nightmare Box	Yes}	Yes	Yes
2016	Element	Yes	No	No
2017	The Harrowing	Yes	Yes	Yes
2018	Alterscape	No	No	Yes
2020	Hooking Up	No	No	Yes
2021	Rogue Hostage	Yes	No	No
2021	The Survivalist	Yes	No	No
2022	Code Name Banshee	Yes	No	Yes
2023	The Kill Room	No	No	Yes
2023	The Last Girl	Yes	No	Yes
2024	Cult Killer	Yes	No	No
2024	The Clean Up Crew	Yes	No	No
2026	Speed Demon	Yes	No	No

Co-producer

- From the Dark (2009)
- Spilt Milk (2010)
- Teen a Go Go: A Little Film About Rock and Roll History (2012)
- Odd Man Out (2014)
- Jack Goes Home (2016)
- King Cobra (2016)
- Welcome to Willits (2016)
- Ten (2017)
- After Everything (2018)
- Welcome the Stranger (2018))
- The Escape of Prisoner 614 (2018)
- The Pretenders (2018)
- Burn (2018)
- Crypto (2018)
- Becky (2020)

=== Television ===
- Inspector Mom - "The Haunted House Horror" (2007)
- Throwing Stones - 6 episodes (2012)
