= Sari Arambulo =

American actress

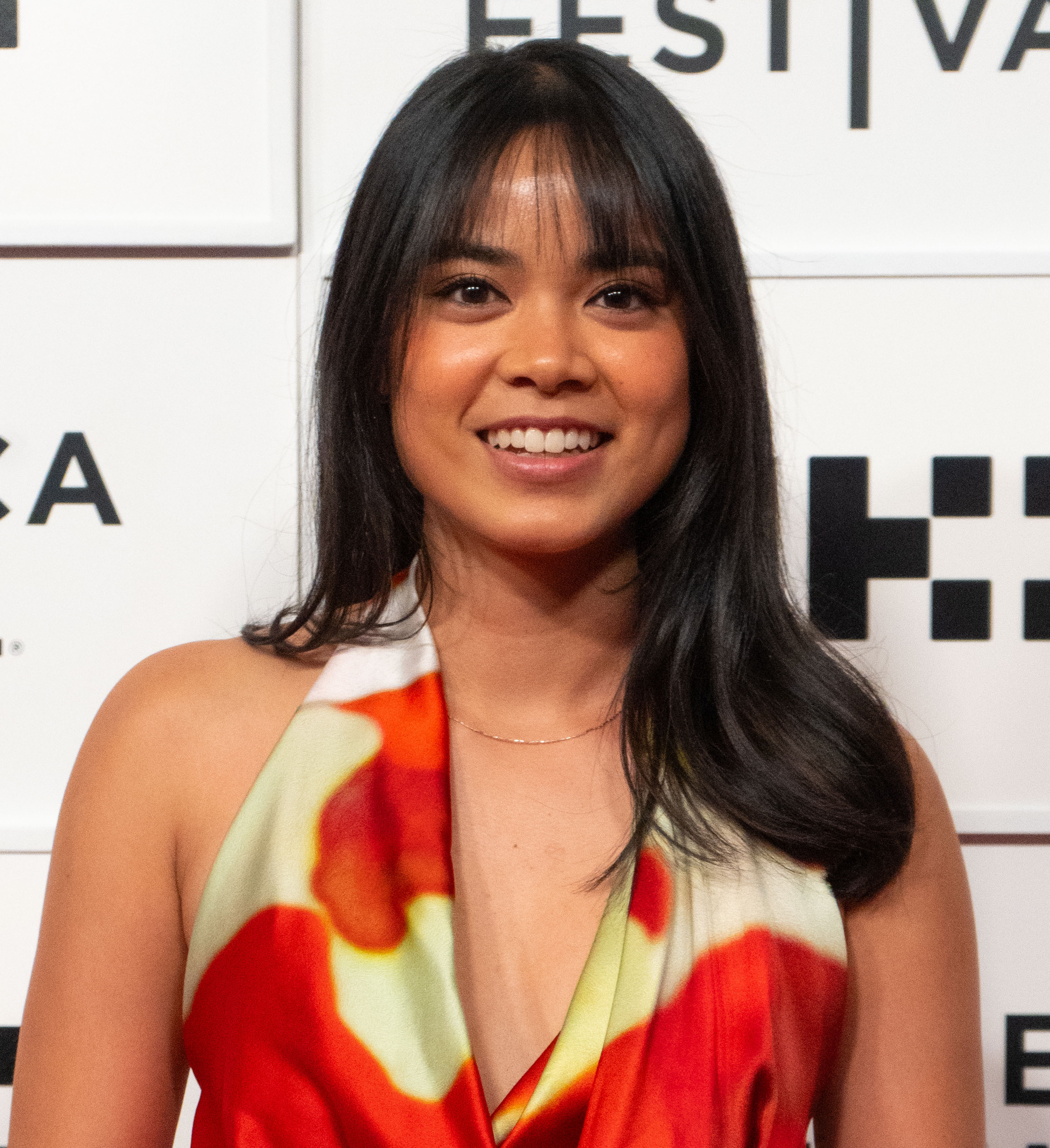
- Arambulo in 2026
- Born: April 16, 1996 (age 30); Los Angeles, California
- Education: University of Southern California (BA)
- Occupation: Actress
- Years active: 2008–present
- Known for: A.P. Bio; Bloody Axe Wound

Sari Arambulo is an American actress. She is best known for playing Grace in the sitcom A.P. Bio and the lead role of Abbie Bladecut in the horror film Bloody Axe Wound.

== Early life ==
Arambulo was born in Los Angeles, California on April 16, 1999. She originally wanted to be a veterinarian because she loves animals. Arambulo graduated from the University of Southern California with a degree in communications, French, and film.

== Career ==
Arambulo began her film career with roles in Abby Normal and Buccaneer Galaxy. Her breakthrough came from playing Grace in the sitcom A.P. Bio. She had a recurring role on the drama series The L Word: Generation Q playing Bella. Arambulo's first lead was as Abbie Bladecut in the horror film Bloody Axe Wound.

== Personal life ==
Arambulo is a devoted fan of early 2000s hip hop, with NSYNC and the Backstreet Boys being among her favorite bands. She has also noted being a fan of actresses Lindsay Lohan and Raven Symone.

== Filmography ==
=== Film ===
Year	Title	Role	Notes
2008	Brown Soup Thing	Lita Mansalud	
2016	Abby Normal	Zoe	
2018	Buccaneer Galaxy	Lycra Bloodstone	Short
2020	Birthmother's Betrayal	Jenny	
2021	Swearing	Ninabelle Navarro	Short
2021	Everything Stays	Sofia	Short
2022	Nothing But Empty Road	Vanessa	Short
2023	A Reason To	Anna	Short
2023	Dear TC, Please Love Me	Martina	Short
2023	The Sauerkraut Queen	Jade	Short
2024	Legally Brown	Mabel	Short
2024	Bloody Axe Wound	Abbie Bladecut	
2026	Speed Demon	Vicky	Post-production

=== Television ===
Year	Title	Role	Notes
2013	See Dad Run	Zoe	Episode; See Dad Play Hard to Get
2013	The Soup Investigates	Teen#2	Episode; #1.1
2013	Perception	Mai Quang	Episode; Caleidoscope
2013	Trophy Wife	Tara	Episode; Russ Bradley Morrison
2014	Girl Meets World	Allison	Episode; Girl Meets Father
2015	The Middle	Kelly	Episode; The Convention
2015	Chase Champion	Nikki	5 episodes
2016	This Isn’t Working	Britney	Episode; Sweet Valley Hell
2016	Sweet/Vicious	Allie	Episode; The Blueprint
2016	Modern Family	Teenage Girl	Episode; Snow Ball
2017	Astrid Clover	Haunted House Girl	Episode; Haunted House
2019	Alexa & Katie	Peggy	Episode; Stupid Binder
2020	Party of Five	Avery	2 episodes
2018-2021	A.P. Bio	Grace	41 episodes
2022-2023	The L Word: Generation Q	Bella	4 episodes
