= Annie Dookhan =

Former American forensic technician (born 1977)

- Born: Annie Sadiyya Khan; 1977 (age 48–49); San Fernando, Trinidad and Tobago
- Education: University of Massachusetts Boston (BS)
- Occupation: Chemist (former)
- Spouse: Surrendranath Dookhan (m. 2004)
- Status: On parole
- Conviction: November 22, 2013 (pleaded guilty)
- Criminal charges: Obstruction of justice, tampering with evidence, perjury, falsification of academic records
- Penalty: Three to five years in prison, two years' probation

Annie Dookhan (born 1977) is an American chemist who was convicted of felony obstruction of justice, tampering with evidence, and other crimes relating to mass falsification of lab results. At the time of her crimes, she worked at the Massachusetts Department of Public Health Drug Abuse lab, but was placed on administrative leave and subsequently quit after admitting to falsifying evidence affecting up to 34,000 cases.

== Early life and education ==
Annie Dookhan was born Annie Sadiyya Khan into an Indo-Trinidadian family in San Fernando, Trinidad and Tobago in 1977. She moved to the United States when she was a child and eventually became a citizen.

Dookhan attended Regis College for two years before earning a Bachelor of Science degree in biochemistry from the University of Massachusetts Boston in 2001. In 2010, a coworker found that Dookhan was claiming on her resume that she had earned a master's degree from the University of Massachusetts. During her time working at the Hinton State Laboratory Institute, Dookhan also claimed to be attending night classes as part of a PhD program at Harvard University.

== Career ==
In 2003, Dookhan was hired as a chemist at the Hinton State Laboratory Institute in the Jamaica Plain neighborhood of Boston.

=== Evidence falsification ===
In June 2011, an evidence officer at the lab discovered that Dookhan had tested 95 samples without properly signing them out. Further investigation revealed that she had forged the initials of an evidence officer in her log book, and she was suspended from lab duties. However, she was still allowed to continue testifying in court until February 2012, when district attorneys throughout the Boston area were notified of the breach in protocol and Dookhan was placed on administrative leave. She resigned in March 2012.

During Dookhan's time at the Hinton lab, it had been run by the Massachusetts Department of Health's Office of Human Services. However, in a cost-cutting move, the Massachusetts General Court transferred control of the lab to the Massachusetts State Police forensics unit in 2011. The state police mounted a probe into the Dookhan case. The probe revealed that Dookhan's superiors had ignored red flags surrounding her before 2011. For instance, she reportedly tested over 500 samples per month—five times the normal average—even though her supervisors and colleagues claimed to have never seen her in front of a microscope, and that she frequently misidentified samples. Additionally, Dookhan's productivity remained steady after the Supreme Court of the United States ruled in Melendez-Diaz v. Massachusetts that chemists who perform drug tests in criminal cases can be subpoenaed to testify in person. According to an independent data analysis by WBUR, Dookhan's turnaround time for tests actually dropped from 2009 to 2011. The problem was severe enough that Governor Deval Patrick ordered the lab shut down.

In August, police interviewed Dookhan at her home in Franklin, where she admitted to altering and faking test results in order to cover up her frequent "dry labbing", or visually identifying samples without actually testing them. She even went as far as to add cocaine to samples in which no cocaine was present. She said she had been dry-labbing for as long as three years. At one point, she broke down, saying, "I messed up, I messed up bad. I don't want the lab to get in trouble."

=== Charges ===
On September 28, 2012, Dookhan was arrested and charged with obstruction of justice and falsification of academic records. The latter charge came because she had claimed both on her resume and in sworn testimony to have had a master's degree in chemistry from the University of Massachusetts Boston. However, school officials revealed that Dookhan had no such degree, and had never taken master's level classes there.

On December 17, Dookhan was formally arraigned on 27 charges—17 counts of obstruction of justice, eight counts of tampering with evidence and one count each of perjury and falsification of records. Prosecutors alleged that whenever a second test failed to confirm the initial results, Dookhan would tamper with the vials to make them consistent with the inaccurate results obtained by her dry labbing. She was also charged with falsely certifying results that she knew to be compromised; these certifications were admitted as evidence in court.

=== Imprisonment ===
On November 22, 2013, Dookhan was sentenced to three to five years of imprisonment and two years of probation by Judge Carol S. Ball in Suffolk Superior Court, after pleading guilty to crimes relating to falsifying drug tests. This was greater than the one-year sentence her defense requested, but less than the five to seven-year sentence requested by the prosecution. However, Ball said that upward departure was merited due to the ramifications of Dookhan's misconduct. Ball wrote, "Innocent persons were incarcerated, guilty persons have been released to further endanger the public, millions and millions of public dollars are being expended to deal with the chaos Ms. Dookhan created, and the integrity of the criminal justice system has been shaken to the core."

Dookhan, Massachusetts Department of Correction inmate F81328, served her sentence at Massachusetts Correctional Institution – Framingham. By April 2016, she had been granted parole and was subsequently released from prison.

=== Impact ===
In January 2015, Benjamin Keehn, a prominent defense attorney with the Committee for Public Counsel Services, said that as many as 40,000 people could have been falsely convicted as a result of Dookhan's actions.

In May 2015, the Massachusetts Supreme Judicial Court ruled that defendants whose convictions on drug charges were based on evidence potentially tainted by Dookhan could pursue retrials without having to face more charges or tougher sentences. However, they would need a retrial to be released.

On April 18, 2017, Massachusetts dropped more than 21,000 low-level drug criminal charges involving Dookhan. Out of the 15,570 cases in which she was involved, only 117 were to be pursued, according to Daniel Conley, the district attorney in Suffolk County, which includes Boston. Other counties followed suit, taking direction from the state Supreme Court to select a small fraction of cases for re-prosecution.

Dookhan's story was the subject of a Netflix series, How to Fix a Drug Scandal created by Erin Lee Carr that was released April 1, 2020. The four-part documentary focuses on Dookhan and an independent case of fraud in a different drug lab by Sonja Farak. How to Fix a Drug Scandal depicts the role of former Attorney General of Massachusetts Martha Coakley, who was accused of political cover up.

== Personal life ==
Dookhan married Surrendranath Dookhan, a software engineer, in 2004. They have one son, Branden Dookhan.

== See also ==
- Sonja Farak—Another former chemist, who allegedly falsified evidence
- Joyce Gilchrist—Another former chemist, who allegedly falsified evidence
- Randox data tampering fraud—A UK toxicology data tampering scandal impacting up to 27,000 cases
- Scientific misconduct
- Fred Zain—An American lab technician who also falsified evidence
