= Kate McKinnon =

American actress and comedian (born 1984)

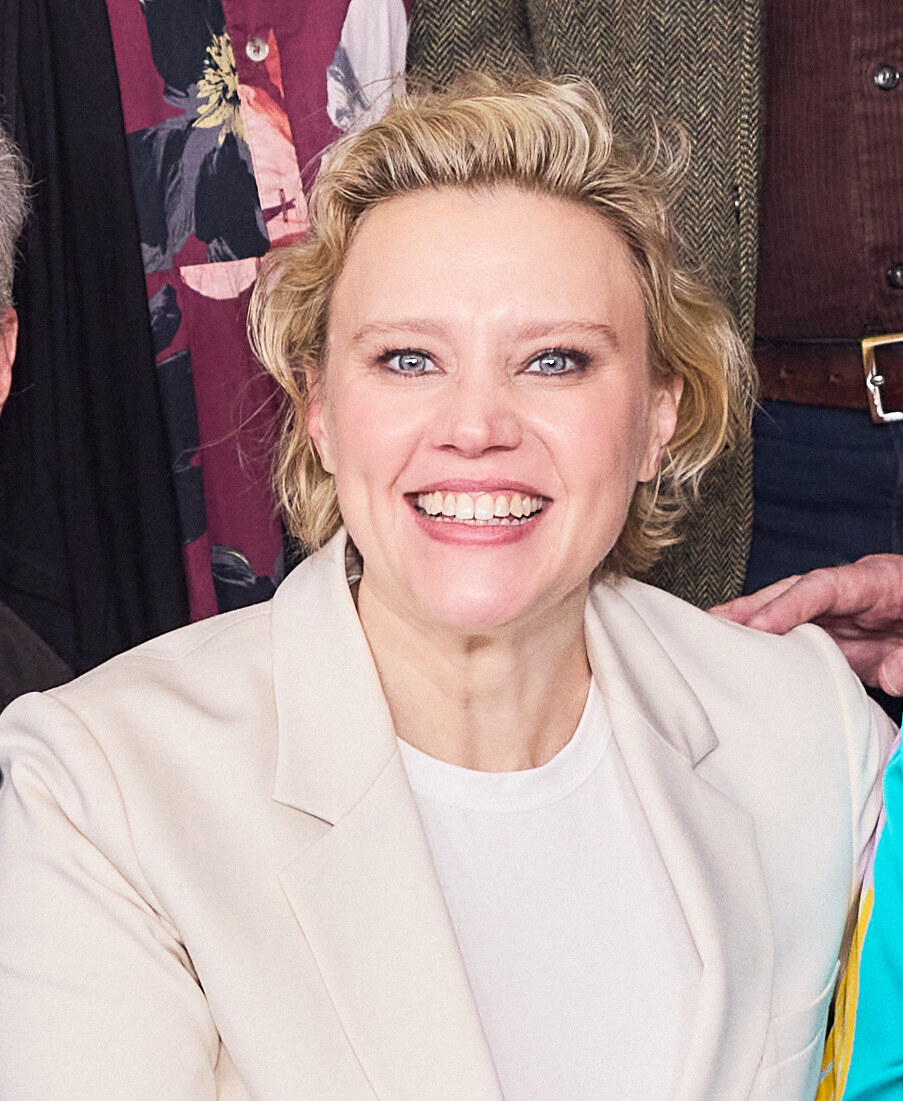
- McKinnon at the 2026 Sundance Film Festival
- Born: Kate McKinnon Berthold; January 6, 1984 (age 42); Sea Cliff, New York, U.S.
- Education: Columbia University (BA)
- Occupations: Actress; comedian; author
- Years active: 2002–present

Kate McKinnon Berthold (born January 6, 1984) is an American comedian, actress and author. She was a cast member on the NBC sketch comedy series Saturday Night Live from 2012 to 2022, where she became known for her character work and celebrity impressions. For her work on the series, she was nominated for ten Primetime Emmy Awards, including one for Outstanding Original Music and Lyrics and nine for Outstanding Supporting Actress in a Comedy Series, winning in 2016 and 2017.

McKinnon starred in the Logo sketch comedy series The Big Gay Sketch Show (2007–2010), voiced lead roles in the PBS Kids animated series Nature Cat (2015–2025) and the Netflix animated series The Magic School Bus Rides Again (2017–2021), and portrayed Carole Baskin in the Peacock miniseries Joe vs. Carole (2022).

McKinnon has appeared in films, including Sisters (2015), Office Christmas Party (2016), Rough Night (2017), The Spy Who Dumped Me (2018), Yesterday (2019), Bombshell (2019), The Bubble (2022), Barbie (2023), The Roses (2025), and In the Blink of an Eye (2026).

She is the author of the Millicent Quibb series for middle grade readers.

== Early life ==
McKinnon was born and raised on Long Island in the town of Sea Cliff, New York, to Laura Campbell, a parent educator, and Michael Thomas Berthold, an architect. She has a younger sister, comedian and actress Emily Lynne, with whom she has collaborated on the Audible series Heads Will Roll, as well as the digital series Notary Publix. Their father died when McKinnon was 18 years old.

As a child, McKinnon played several instruments. She started playing the piano when she was five years old, the cello at age 12, and taught herself how to play the guitar at 15.

McKinnon's knack for accents began when she was in fifth grade. She auditioned to be "the queen of reading week" and used an English accent. In an interview with Rolling Stone, she says, "I think the genesis of my entire life, probably, was the smiles I elicited doing this British accent. I've been chasing that dragon ever since."

She graduated from North Shore High School in 2002, and from Columbia University in 2006 with a degree in theatre. There she co-founded a comedy group, Tea Party, that focused on musical improv comedy. At Columbia, she starred in three Varsity shows: V109 Dial D for Deadline, V110 Off-Broadway and V111 The Sound of Muses. Her cast and crewmates included future actors Jenny Slate and Grace Parra, directors Tze Chun and Greta Gerwig, and The Onion managing editor Peter Koechley. She was also a member of Prangstgrüp, a student comedy group which set up and recorded elaborate college pranks.

== Career ==
In 2007, McKinnon joined the original cast of Logo TV's The Big Gay Sketch Show, where she was a cast member for all three seasons.

Since 2008, she has performed live sketch comedy regularly at the Upright Citizens Brigade Theatre in New York City. She has also worked as a voice-over actress, and has voiced characters for series such as The Venture Bros., Robotomy, and Ugly Americans. In 2009, McKinnon won a Logo NewNowNext Award for Best Rising Comic. She was nominated for an ECNY Emerging Comic Award in 2010. In 2014, she appeared in the Kennedy Center Honors as part of a tribute to Lily Tomlin. In 2016, she starred in the reboot Ghostbusters, alongside Melissa McCarthy, and fellow SNL cast members Kristen Wiig and Leslie Jones. In 2023, she played Weird Barbie in the Barbie movie. In 2025, she co-starred in the films The Roses, and In the Blink of an Eye.

McKinnon has made appearances as a voice actress in series like The Simpsons (as Hettie in "Gal of Constant Sorrow") and Family Guy (as Karen / Heavy Flo in season 14, episode 6 "Peter's Sister," and additional voices in other episodes), and films such as Finding Dory, The Angry Birds Movie, Ferdinand and DC League of Super-Pets. McKinnon voiced Fiona Frizzle in The Magic School Bus Rides Again, a continuation of The Magic School Bus children's series, from 2017 to 2020. Since 2015, she has voiced Squeeks in the PBS Kids series Nature Cat, starring with fellow SNL cast members Taran Killam and Bobby Moynihan.

=== Saturday Night Live ===
McKinnon joined the cast of Saturday Night Live as a featured player on April 7, 2012, following a March 28, 2012 report of her being hired. She was promoted to repertory status in season 39 in 2013.

In 2013, McKinnon was nominated for an Emmy Award for Best Supporting Actress, Comedy. McKinnon won the 2014 American Comedy Award for Best Supporting Actress, TV for her work on SNL. In 2014, she was nominated for an Emmy Award for Outstanding Supporting Actress in a Comedy Series, as well as for Outstanding Original Music and Lyrics along with four of her colleagues for the song "(Do It On My) Twin Bed." She was nominated for an Emmy for Outstanding Supporting Actress in a Comedy Series for the second time in 2015. She won the following year, becoming the first actor from SNL to win the award since Dana Carvey in 1993.

McKinnon began appearing as Hillary Clinton on the series leading up to the 2016 presidential election. The real Clinton appeared alongside her in a sketch during the show's season 41 premiere. McKinnon has said that her impression of Hillary Clinton comes from a deep admiration, and that she "unequivocally want[ed] her to win" the 2016 presidential election. On November 12, 2016, which was the first show after Clinton's loss in the election, she reprised the role to open the show with a solo performance of "Hallelujah" by Leonard Cohen, whose death was announced two days before her performance. After the election, McKinnon began to impersonate Trump advisor Kellyanne Conway alongside Alec Baldwin as Donald Trump. On February 11, 2017, she debuted her impression of Elizabeth Warren during Weekend Update and Jeff Sessions in the cold open.

McKinnon is known for her character work and celebrity impressions of pop singer Justin Bieber, comedian television host Ellen DeGeneres, and numerous political figures, including US Attorney General Jeff Sessions, Senator Lindsey Graham, Supreme Court Justice Ruth Bader Ginsburg, Clinton, Warren, Robert Mueller, Angela Merkel, and Rudy Giuliani. She has been nominated for seven Primetime Emmy Awards, including one for Outstanding Original Music and Lyrics and six for Outstanding Supporting Actress in a Comedy Series, winning in 2016 and 2017.

McKinnon's return to season 46 made her the show's longest tenured female cast member, surpassing her cast mates Cecily Strong and Aidy Bryant by five episodes. Bryant and McKinnon left the series after season 47. They had both originally planned on leaving at the end of the 45th season in 2020, but the COVID-19 pandemic changed their plans and they left at the end of season 47 in 2022. Strong passed McKinnon's record with the December 17, 2022 episode of season 48.

==== Saturday Night Live characters ====
- Olya Povlatsky, a Russian woman who voices her opinions on current events, comparing them to the outrageous struggles she faces in her village. She also appeared in a cold open with Beck Bennett as Vladimir Putin reading a prepared statement against her will.
- Sheila Sovage, a heavily intoxicated woman at a bar who meets and hooks up with a heavily intoxicated man or woman, played by the host, at closing time.
- Jodi Cork, The Art of the Encounter and Women in the Workplace co-host with Donna Fingerneck (played by Cecily Strong).
- Barbara DeDrew, a lesbian volunteer at the cat shelter Whiskers R We.
- Deenie, a.k.a. "Somebody's Mom," a middle-aged woman who attempts to recap shows she's been watching, but only knows the characters by self-applied nicknames, such as "Big Boobs" and "Mustache." She is always eating some foul concoction out of Tupperware, such as Brussels sprouts and imitation crab, which generally revolts Weekend Update anchor Colin Jost.
- Mrs. Santini, an apartment dweller who writes passive-aggressive notes to her neighbors. Originally performed as Effie Villalopolus on Comedy Bang! Bang!
- Colleen Rafferty, a 27-year old woman (despite looking middle-aged, implicitly due to her repeated traumas) who appears on panels with two friends. They recount their experience of a shared paranormal event, such as being abducted by aliens. The other two friends always have an idyllic experience, while Rafferty instead experiences significant trauma.
- Les Dykawitz, a lesbian cop from the 1970s who works for the Chicago Police Department along with her partner Chubina Fatzarelli (played by Aidy Bryant) in "Dyke & Fats."
- Debette Goldry, a senile elderly actress whose harsh experiences with being an actress in old Hollywood are more outrageous than what modern actresses have gone through.
- A member of Woodbridge High School's theatre troupe that performs solely about social justice issues they know very little about.
- Noelle LeSoup, the co-host of the French show "America's Funniest Cats" who appears on the American version of the show along with Joelle LaRue (played by Cecily Strong).
- Shud, a crass mermaid who is based on a blobfish, and makes sexual advances on an unfortunate marooned sailor.
- Dr. Wayne Wenowdis, a strangely accented middle-aged medical doctor, who debuted in 2020, as part of the Weekend Update segment with Colin Jost.
- Madame Vivelda, a fortune teller who predicts people's 2020 experiences.

==== Saturday Night Live impressions ====
- Gillian Anderson
- Julian Assange
- Iggy Azalea
- Amy Coney Barrett
- Joy Behar
- Ingrid Bergman
- Mary Berry
- Justin Bieber
- Mika Brzezinski
- Theresa Caputo
- Liz Cheney
- Emilia Clarke
- Hillary Clinton
- Kellyanne Conway
- Barbara Corcoran
- Penelope Cruz
- Ellen DeGeneres
- Betsy DeVos
- Dido
- Robert Durst
- Elizabeth II
- Edie Falco
- Anthony Fauci
- Jodie Foster
- Cecilia Giménez
- Ruth Bader Ginsburg
- Rudy Giuliani
- Lindsey Graham
- Savannah Guthrie
- Bella Hadid
- Laura Ingraham
- Billie Jean King
- Jemima Kirke
- Heidi Klum
- Lisa Kudrow
- Lorde
- Taylor Louderman
- Lori Loughlin
- Jane Lynch
- Theresa May
- Frances McDormand
- Angela Merkel
- Nancy Pelosi
- Michelle Pfeiffer
- Ann Romney
- Wilbur Ross
- Jeff Sessions
- Shakira
- Maggie Smith
- Martha Stewart
- Tilda Swinton
- Ginni Thomas
- Greta Thunberg
- Keith Urban
- Greta Van Susteren
- Yolandi Visser
- Nicolle Wallace
- Elizabeth Warren
- Debbie Wasserman Schultz
- Janet Yellen

=== Work as a creator ===
McKinnon co-created and co-stars in the web series Notary Publix with her sister Emily Lynne. In addition to Aidy Bryant (who stars in the series), McKinnon's SNL co-stars Beck Bennett, Jay Pharoah and SNL writer Paula Pell all guest-starred in the six-episode first season of the web series.

McKinnon and Lynne also created and released the fantasy-comedy Audible audio series Heads Will Roll, which premiered in May 2019. The show features guest appearances from Meryl Streep, Peter Dinklage, Audra McDonald, Bob the Drag Queen, Queer Eye's Fab Five, and Tim Gunn. Additionally, many of McKinnon's SNL co-stars are featured, including Aidy Bryant, Alex Moffat, Heidi Gardner and Chris Redd. A second season featuring Richard Kind, Megan Mullaly, Carrie Coon, and Laurie Metcalf was released in 2026.

=== Other work ===
In 2015, McKinnon appeared in a number of commercials for the Ford Focus.

In 2016, McKinnon co-hosted the 31st Independent Spirit Awards with Kumail Nanjiani.

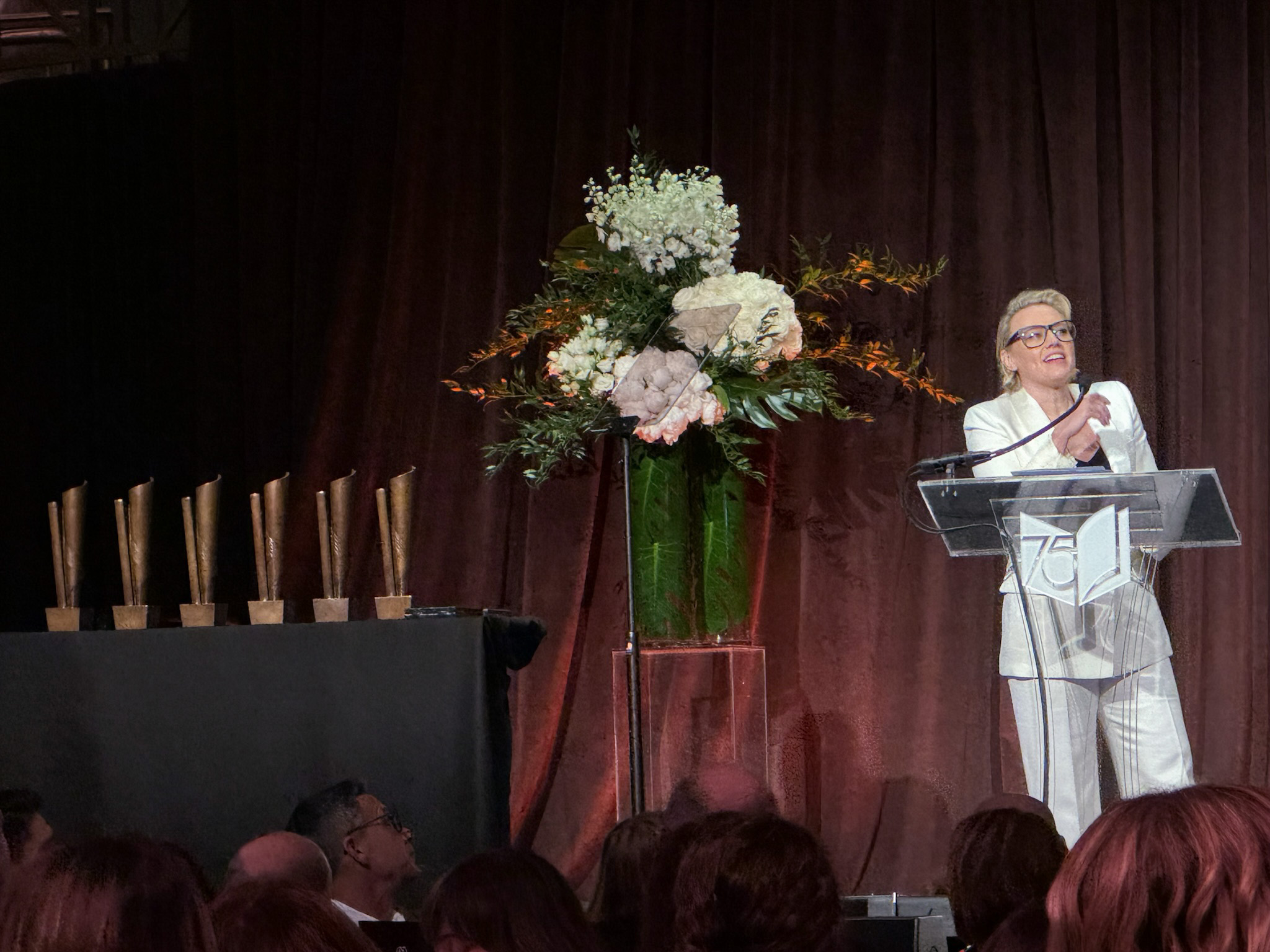
McKinnon at the 2024 National Book Awards ceremony

Her absence from the first seven episodes of Saturday Night Live's 47th season was due to her filming the Peacock miniseries Joe vs. Carole, where she stars as Carole Baskin. It premiered March 3, 2022.

McKinnon is the author of the middle grade series The Millicent Quibb School of Etiquette for Young Ladies of Mad Science. It chronicles the adventures of the Porch Sisters and their mentor, the mad scientist Millicent Quibb, in the fictional town of Antiquarium. In 2025, she published a second book, Secrets of the Purple Pearl.

In November 2024, McKinnon served as the host of the National Book Awards in New York City.

== Personal life ==
While attending Columbia University, she dated future journalist Bari Weiss. McKinnon was in a relationship with photographer and actress Jackie Abbott from 2016 to 2019. While presenting Ellen DeGeneres with the Carol Burnett Award at the 2020 Golden Globe Awards, McKinnon opened up about being a lesbian and thanked DeGeneres for making it less scary for her to accept her sexual orientation while watching her TV sitcom Ellen.

== Filmography ==
=== Film ===
Year	Title	Role	Notes
2010	Mr. Ross	Debby	Short film
2011	Elizabeth Taylor's Video Will	Elizabeth Taylor	Short film
2011	Pudding Face	Amy	Short film
2012	My Best Day	Heather	
2012	Hannah Has a Ho-Phase	Nicky	
2014	Life Partners	Trace	
2014	Balls Out	Vicky Albrecht	
2015	Giant Sloth	Nina	Voice, short film
2015	Ted 2	Herself	
2015	Staten Island Summer	Mrs. Bandini Jr.	
2015	Sisters	Sam	
2016	The Angry Birds Movie	Stella / Eva	Voice
2016	Finding Dory	Inez	Voice
2016	Ghostbusters	Dr. Jillian Holtzmann	
2016	Masterminds	Jandice Gartrell	
2016	Office Christmas Party	Mary Winetoss	
2017	Rough Night	Pippa / Kiwi	
2017	Leap!	Régine Le Haut / Felicie's Mother / Mother Superior	Voice, US dub
2017	Ferdinand	Lupe	Voice
2018	Irreplaceable You	Glass Half Full Kate	
2018	Family	Jill	
2018	The Spy Who Dumped Me	Morgan Freeman	
2019	Yesterday	Debra Hammer	
2019	Bombshell	Jess Carr	
2020	The Magic School Bus Rides Again: Kids in Space	Miss Fiona Frizzle	Voice
2022	The Bubble	Paula	
2022	DC League of Super-Pets	Lulu	Voice
2023	Barbie	Weird Barbie	
2025	A Minecraft Movie	Alex	Uncredited voice cameo
2025	The Roses	Amy	
2026	In the Blink of an Eye	Coakley	
2026	The Wrong Girls	Dr. Olsen	
TBA	Thumb †		Post-production
TBA	One Attempt Remaining †		Filming
TBA	Dedicated to Morris Burke †		Filming

Key
†	Denotes films that have not yet been released

=== Television ===
Year	Title	Role	Notes
2006–2010	The Big Gay Sketch Show	Various	23 episodes
2008	Mayne Street	Olga Svenson	Episode: "Parking Tickets"
2010	We Have to Stop Now	Angela	Episode: "Celesbianism"
2010	Concierge: The Series	Mary	3 episodes
2010	Vag Magazine	Bethany	6 episodes
2010–2011	Robotomy	Additional voices	5 episodes
2010–2016	The Venture Bros.	Nikki and Margaret Fictel / Additional voices	10 episodes
2011	The Back Room	Susan Boyle	Episode: "Todd Barry"
2011	The 40-Year-Old 20-Year-Old	Kate	5 episodes
2012	Saturday Night Live Weekend Update Thursday	Various	2 episodes
2012–2022	Saturday Night Live	Various	Main cast
2013	Toy Story of Terror!	PEZ Cat	Voice, television special
2013	Hudson Valley Ballers	Just Jamie	2 episodes
2014	Comedy Bang! Bang!	Effie Villalopolus	Episode: "Nick Offerman Wears a Green Flannel Shirt & Brown Boots"
2014–2015	The Awesomes	Lola Gold / Additional voices	7 episodes
2015	China, IL	Sunshine	Voice, 5 episodes
2015	The Spoils Before Dying	Dallas Boudreaux	Episode: "That's Jazz"
2015	Difficult People	Abra Cadouglas	Episode: "Pledge Week"
2015	Moonbeam City	Panache Miller	Voice, episode: "Lasers and Liars"
2015–2016	Family Guy	Karen Griffin / Additional voices	3 episodes
2015–2025	Nature Cat	Squeeks	Voice, main role (82 episodes)
2016	31st Independent Spirit Awards	Herself (host)	Television special
2016	Maya & Marty	Heidi Cruz	Episode: "Jimmy Fallon & Miley Cyrus"
2016	The Simpsons	Hettie Mae Boggs	Voice, episode: "Gal of Constant Sorrow"
2017	Friends from College	Shawna	Episode: "All-Nighter"
2017–2021	The Magic School Bus Rides Again	Fiona Felicity Frizzle	Voice, 30 episodes
2018	Sesame Street	Mother Goose	Episode: "Elmo's Nursery Rhyme"
2019	Breakfast, Lunch & Dinner	Herself	Episode: "Phnom Penh"
2020	Celebrity Escape Room	Herself	Television special
2022	Joe vs. Carole	Carole Baskin	8 episodes; also executive producer
2023	Saturday Night Live	Herself (host)	Episode: "Kate McKinnon/Billie Eilish"
2026	Percy Jackson and the Olympians	Aphrodite	Guest Cast (season 3)

=== Audio series ===
Year	Title	Role	Production role
2019	Heads Will Roll	Queen Mortunana of the Night Realm	Co-creator and star

== Awards and nominations ==
Year	Award	Category	Work	Result
2009	NewNowNext Awards	Brink of Fame: Comic		Won
2010	ECNY Awards	Emerging Comic Award		Nominated
2012	Ashland Independent Film Festival Awards	Special Jury Mention for Acting Ensemble: Feature	My Best Day	Won
2013	EWwy Awards	Best Supporting Actress in a Comedy Series	Saturday Night Live	Nominated
2014	American Comedy Awards	Comedy Supporting Actress – TV	Saturday Night Live	Won
2014	Dorian Awards	Wilde Wit of the Year		Nominated
2014	Primetime Emmy Awards	Outstanding Supporting Actress in a Comedy Series	Saturday Night Live	Nominated
2014	Primetime Emmy Awards	Outstanding Original Music and Lyrics	Saturday Night Live	Nominated
2015	Primetime Emmy Awards	Outstanding Supporting Actress in a Comedy Series	Saturday Night Live	Nominated
2016	Primetime Emmy Awards	Outstanding Supporting Actress in a Comedy Series	Saturday Night Live	Won
2016	Critics' Choice Television Awards	Best Actress in a Comedy Series	Saturday Night Live	Won
2016	The Advocate Awards	The Advocate's Person of the Year		Finalist
2016	USA Today Awards	USA Today's Entertainer of the Year		Won
2016	Critics' Choice Movie Awards	Best Actress in a Comedy Movie	Ghostbusters	Nominated
2016	San Diego Film Critics Society Awards	Best Comedic Performance	Ghostbusters	Nominated
2016	Women Film Critics Circle	Best Comedic Actress	Ghostbusters	Won
2016	Women Film Critics Circle	Best Female Action Hero	Ghostbusters	Won
2016	Women Film Critics Circle	Best Ensemble	Ghostbusters	Nominated
2017	Saturn Awards	Best Supporting Actress	Ghostbusters	Nominated
2017	People's Choice Awards	Favorite Comedic Collaboration	Saturday Night Live	Nominated
2017	Dorian Awards	T.V. Musical Performance of the Year	Saturday Night Live	Won
2017	Dorian Awards	Wilde Wit of the Year		Nominated
2017	Dorian Awards	Wilde Artist of the Year		Won
2017	Daytime Emmy Awards	Outstanding Performer in an Animated Program	Nature Cat	Nominated
2017	Primetime Emmy Awards	Outstanding Supporting Actress in a Comedy Series	Saturday Night Live	Won
2018	MTV Movie & TV Awards	Best Comedic Performance	Saturday Night Live	Nominated
2018	Primetime Emmy Awards	Outstanding Supporting Actress in a Comedy Series	Saturday Night Live	Nominated
2019	Primetime Emmy Awards	Outstanding Supporting Actress in a Comedy Series	Saturday Night Live	Nominated
2020	Primetime Emmy Awards	Outstanding Supporting Actress in a Comedy Series	Saturday Night Live	Nominated
2020	Critics' Choice Movie Awards	Best Acting Ensemble	Bombshell	Nominated
2020	Screen Actors Guild Awards	Outstanding Performance by a Cast in a Motion Picture	Bombshell	Nominated
2021	Primetime Emmy Awards	Outstanding Supporting Actress in a Comedy Series	Saturday Night Live	Nominated
2022	Primetime Emmy Awards	Outstanding Supporting Actress in a Comedy Series	Saturday Night Live	Nominated
2023	Screen Actors Guild Awards	Outstanding Performance by a Cast in a Motion Picture	Barbie	Nominated

== See also ==
- LGBT culture in New York City
- List of LGBT people from New York City
- NYC Pride March
- Saturday Night Live parodies of Hillary Clinton
