= Cult Killer =

2024 film by Jon Keeyes

- Theatrical release poster
- Directed by: Jon Keeyes
- Written by: Charles Burnley
- Produced by: Richard Bolger; Conor Barry; Michael J. Rothstein; Richard Clabaugh; Jon Keeyes; Jordan Beckerman; Jordan Yale Levine
- Starring: Alice Eve; Shelley Hennig; Paul Reid; Antonio Banderas
- Cinematography: Austin F. Schmidt
- Edited by: R. J. Cooper
- Music by: Aoifee O'Leary; Gerry Owens
- Production company: Yale Productions
- Distributed by: Saban Films
- Release date: January 19, 2024
- Running time: 105 minutes
- Country: United States
- Language: English
- Box office: $78,474

Cult Killer is a 2024 American crime thriller film directed by Jon Keeyes and written by Charles Burnley, starring Alice Eve and Antonio Banderas.

== Premise ==
In order to discover the killer of her mentor, a young investigator forms an alliance with a serial killer.

== Cast ==
- Alice Eve as Cassie Holt
- Antonio Banderas as Mikeal Tallini
- Paul Reid as Rory McMahon
- Shelley Hennig as Jamie Douglas

== Production ==
Written by Charles Burnley, it is directed by Jon Keeyes. The film originally had the working title The Last Girl. The film is produced by Jordan Yale Levine, Jordan Beckerman, and Michael J. Rothstein for Yale, as well as Richard Bolger and Conor Barry from Hail Mary Pictures, and Richard Clabaugh.

Alice Eve, Shelley Hennig and Antonio Banderas joined the cast in June 2022.

Principal photography took place in Ireland and was completed in September 2022.

== Release ==
The film received a token theatrical release in the United States on January 19, 2024, before being made available to streaming services, with very limited releases in other territories. Cult Killer registered no box office domestically (United States and Canada), and US$78,474 in other territories, for a worldwide total of $78,474 at the box office.

== Critical response ==
On the review aggregator website Rotten Tomatoes, 42% of 12 critics' reviews are positive, with an average rating of 5.6/10.

Julian Roman of MovieWeb gave the film a rating of 3 out of 5 and wrote, "Cult Killer is fervently gripping and even impressively appalling despite a major flaw. There's little backbone to flimsy investigative elements."

Giving the film a rating of 1.5 out of 4 Roger Moore of Movie Nation was unsatisfied and he wrote, "A most peculiar Irish spree-killer thriller about the trauma of abuse, the monstrous sins of the super rich and some bizarre quirks of the Irish criminal justice system that one suspects are just clumsy inventions of the screenwriter."
