= Uncle Peckerhead =

2020 film by Travis Stevens

- Directed by: Matthew John Lawrence
- Screenplay by: Matthew John Lawrence
- Starring: David Littleton; Chet Siegel; Jeff Riddle; Ruby McCollister; Shannon O'Neill
- Release date: January 25, 2020 (Panic Fest)
- Running time: 97 minutes
- Country: United States
- Language: English

Uncle Peckerhead is a 2020 comedy-horror film written and directed by Matthew John Lawrence.

== Plot ==
The members of the band Duh (Judy, Max, and Mel) have all quit their jobs and are ready to embark on their first tour. The first roadblock on their journey is the fact that their van was repossessed. Desperate for a vehicle, the band placed flyers on every van in town asking to use it for their tour. One van is occupied by one Uncle Peckerhead (or "Peck" as he is known to his friends) who offers to drive the band and be their roadie. However, it turns out that Peck turns into a man-eating monster for thirteen minutes every night at midnight.

== Cast ==
- David Littleton – Peckerhead
- Chet Siegel – Judy
- Jeff Riddle – Max
- Ruby McCollister – Mel
- Shannon O'Neill – Jen Jennings
- Ryan Conrath – Shiloh

== Reception ==
The film is rated 100% at Rotten Tomatoes with 17 reviews. Bloody Disgusting gave it four out of five skulls and called it "laugh-out-loud funny and gruesomely gory." Rue Morgue praised the film and called it "a love letter to the punk-indie aesthetic." The A.V. Club called the film "a Z-movie that is so good-naturedly stupid, it slowly wins you over through sheer fey likability."
