= How to Fix a Drug Scandal =

2020 American documentary television miniseries

- Genre: Documentary; Crime
- Country of origin: United States
- Original languages: English; Spanish
- No. of seasons: 1
- No. of episodes: 4

Production
- Running time: 47–59 minutes

Original release
- Network: Netflix
- Release: April 1, 2020

How to Fix a Drug Scandal is an American true crime documentary miniseries that was released on Netflix on April 1, 2020. It was produced by documentary filmmaker Erin Lee Carr and examined the roles of two forensic chemists at different laboratories in Massachusetts, Sonja Farak and Annie Dookhan, who tampered with evidence and falsified drug certificates of defendants; and the impact this had on thousands of cases involving drug testing handled by the two women.

== Events ==
Dookhan was the most productive forensic chemist at a lab in Boston, producing four times as many test certificates as any other chemist. Once an investigation began, it turned out that, for the most part, she was not testing the drugs at all, but was falsifying reports in order to be perceived as hard-working.

Farak worked at a lab in Amherst and was a drug addict. She tampered with the evidence she was tasked with analyzing, instead using it to get high herself. She was only charged in regard to two particular samples in a six month period and served 18 months in prison. She later admitted she was under the influence of drugs the entire ten years she worked at the laboratory.

The actions of both women, who acted independently, resulted in tens of thousands of drug counts being dismissed, the largest single mass dismissal of criminal cases in U.S. history. How to Fix a Drug Scandal also describes how two former assistant Attorneys General of Massachusetts, Anne Kaczmarek and Kris Foster, failed to turn over crucial evidence to the defense and misled the judge in the case, and explains the impact of this misconduct.

== Episode breakdown ==
Episode 1: "The Evidence Never Lies"

The series begins by introducing Sonja Farak, a forensic chemist at the Amherst drug lab, who was arrested in 2013 for tampering with drug evidence. It is revealed that Farak had been stealing and using drugs from seized samples, raising concerns about thousands of cases she had worked on. The episode also introduces Annie Dookhan, another chemist at a separate Boston lab, who was caught falsifying drug test results. Through interviews and archival footage, the episode sets the stage for the crisis and highlights its impact on the criminal justice system.

Episode 2: "The Rogue Chemist"

This episode explores the depth of Farak's addiction and misconduct. Investigators uncover that she not only consumed seized drugs but also tampered with lab standards, which were meant to ensure accurate drug testing. Meanwhile, the episode examines Dookhan's fraudulent testing practices and how they contributed to wrongful convictions. As investigations into both chemists continue, prosecutors attempt to limit the scope of the damage.

Episode 3: "Damage Control"

Legal and political fallout comes into focus as the Massachusetts Attorney General's Office, led by assistant attorneys general Anne Kaczmarek and Kris Foster, withholds key evidence about the extent of Farak's drug abuse. Defense attorneys argue that thousands of cases may have been compromised, but prosecutors mislead the court to downplay the impact. The episode reveals the prosecutorial misconduct involved in suppressing crucial information from defense teams.

Episode 4: "Snowball Effect"

The final episode highlights the long-term consequences of the scandal. Courts respond by ordering the dismissal of tens of thousands of drug convictions, marking the largest mass dismissal of criminal cases in U.S. history. The documentary also explores the personal impact on individuals wrongfully convicted due to the compromised forensic work. The series concludes by questioning systemic corruption, forensic oversight failures, and the broader implications for the justice system.

== Release ==
How to Fix a Drug Scandal was released on April 1, 2020, on Netflix.
