= Vag Magazine =

- Genre: Comedy, web series
- Created by: Leila Cohan-Miccio; Caitlin Tegart
- Written by: Leila Cohan-Miccio; Caitlin Tegart
- Starring: Kate McKinnon; Jocelyn Guest; Nicole Drespel; Sarah Claspell
- Country of origin: United States
- Original language: English

Production
- Executive producers: Leila Cohan-Miccio; Caitlin Tegart

Vag Magazine, which was created in 2010 by Leila Cohan-Miccio and Caitlin Tegart, is an American feminist themed comedy web series starring Kate McKinnon, Jocelyn Guest, Nicole Drespel, Sarah Claspell, Veronica Osorio, and Leslie Meisel. The web series in its entirety can be found on YouTube and Vimeo. Filmed at Upright Citizens Brigade Theatre, Vag Magazine was directed by Zach Neumeyer and produced by Nicole Shabtai.

The six-episode mini-series was created to take a comedic, satirical approach to feminism. Writer and creator, Caitlin Tegart, said in an interview about Vag Magazine, "ultimately, people like to be parodied and I hope that it’s obvious from our parodies that we are feminists...in a way, we are saying that this is important enough to be parodied."

== Synopsis ==
With the proceeds of their Etsy shop, three “hipster third-wave feminists”, Bethany, Sylvie, and Fennel buyout fashion magazine Gemma, and come together to create Vag Magazine. The lone standing Gemma holdover, Meghan, is skeptical about the re-branding. In the midst of creating Vag Magazine, co-creators Bethany, Sylvie, and Fennel get their vision for “Vag” entangled, ultimately putting the fate of the magazine at stake. Meghan is offered a position at competing magazine, “Cunt Mag”, and is met with choosing between a new position or sticking it out with the dysfunctional, yet endearing friends she’s made along the way at Vag Magazine.

== Cast ==
- Kate McKinnon as Bethany
- Jocelyn Guest as Sylvie
- Nicole Drespel as Fennel
- Sarah Claspell as Meghan
- Leslie Meisel as Reba
- Veronica Osorio as Heavy Flo

== Production ==
Creators of Vag Magazine, Leila Cohan-Miccio and Caitlin Tegart, have mentioned in interviews that a goal of theirs with the web-series was to appeal concepts of feminism to a larger demographic. By using cringe and satire, the series interrupts the fantasies of the male gaze and makes room for the complexity, and seemingly shameful realities, of the female experience. Yet, humor has not always been a friend of the feminist movement - the 1960s and 70s were tainted with ridicule against women. Writer and comedian, Kate Clinton, notes: "Men have used humor against women so long--we know implicitly whose butt is the butt of their jokes--that we do not trust humor." To perform stand-up comedy—to be aggressively funny—is to violate the norms of femininity.

Vag Magazine was both created and filmed at Upright Citizens Brigade Theatre (UCB Theatre), an improvisational theater company which was founded by comedians Amy Poehler, Matt Walsh, Ian Roberts, and Matt Besser. Other notable comedians who emerged from UCB include Donald Glover, Ed Helms, Ellie Kemper, Aubrey Plaza, and Nick Kroll.

== Critical Response ==
Viewers of Vag Magazine have varied perspectives on the concept of feminism, and furthermore third-wave feminism. Therefore, the web-series was met with mixed reviews. Natasha Leupke, guest writer for The Society Pages, reflects: "Third-wave feminism is sometimes viewed with disdain because it can seem empty: if any choice a woman makes can be construed as feminist, then perhaps no act can be truly called feminist." The web-series generated conversation on different perceptions of feminism. Leupke went on to mention that "the series humorously highlights the bind which modern feminists often find themselves in: how to be inclusive without embracing everything, [and] how to be forthright of inequality [without] bullying."

Alice Wetterlund of Slate Magazine offered that the series made her realize why public-service comedy grosses her out. That the series itself is "debatably" comedic, and in fact not a "call to arms for some sequestered faction of feminism."

In typical third-wave style, Vag Magazine is an example of when the woman has the capacity to play along with the rules of gender display and simultaneously work aggressively for social justice. And yet, this is often critiqued and approached with trepidation. Many third-wave narratives tell of women doing feminism without knowing or labeling it as such. While the characters in Vag Magazine label their feminism in the name of satire, they equally exhibit how women can perform the dichotomy of gender display while still working towards social justice.
