= List of body horror media =

Body horror, biological horror, organic horror or visceral horror is horror fiction in which the horror is principally derived from the unnatural graphic transformation, degeneration or destruction of the physical body. Such works may deal with decay, disease, deformity, parasitism, mutation or mutilation. Other types of body horror include unnatural movements or the anatomically incorrect placement of limbs to create "monsters" from human body parts. David Cronenberg, Frank Henenlotter, Brian Yuzna, Stuart Gordon, Lloyd Kaufman, and Clive Barker are notable directors of this genre. The term body horror was coined with the "Body Horror" theme issue of the University of Glasgow film journal Screen (vol. 27, no. 1, January–February 1986), which contains several essays on the subject.

== Notable films and television series ==
Film/TV series	Year	Notes
The Quatermass Xperiment	1955	Based on the 1953 BBC Television serial The Quatermass Experiment.
X the Unknown	1956	
Invasion of the Body Snatchers	1956	As well as the 1978 remake, Body Snatchers, and The Invasion.
Quatermass 2	1957	Based on the 1955 BBC Television serial Quatermass II.
Fiend Without a Face	1958	
The H-Man	1958	
The Blob	1958	Including its 1972 sequel Beware! The Blob and 1988 remake The Blob.
I Married a Monster from Outer Space	1958	
Space Master X-7	1958	
The Fly	1958	And its 1959 and 1965 sequels, the 1986 remake, and the 1989 sequel to the remake.
Caltiki	1959	
First Man into Space	1959	
The Wasp Woman	1959	
The Tingler	1959	
Eyes Without a Face	1960	
The Hands of Orlac	1960	
Horrors of Spider Island	1960	
The Outer Limits	1963–1965	And the 1995 remake.
Rosemary's Baby	1968	
Godzilla vs. Hedorah	1971	
Devilman	1972–1973	
Sssssss	1973	
The Exorcist	1973	
Shanks	1974	
The Devil's Rain	1975	
Shivers	1975	
Squirm	1976	
Demon Seed	1977	
Eraserhead	1977	
The Incredible Melting Man	1977	
Rabid	1977	As well its 2019 remake.
The Fury	1978	
Alien franchise	1979–present	
The Brood	1979	
Prophecy	1979	
Alien 2: On Earth	1980	
Altered States	1980	
The Shining	1980	
An American Werewolf in London	1981	
Evil Dead franchise	1981–present	
Galaxy of Terror	1981	
The Howling	1981	
Inseminoid	1981	
Possession	1981	
Scanners	1981	
The Thing	1982	And its 2011 prequel.
Forbidden World	1982	
The Beast Within	1982	
Parasite 3D	1982	
The Deadly Spawn	1983	
Videodrome	1983	
Xtro	1983	
The Terminator	1984	
A Nightmare on Elm Street franchise	1984–present	
The Toxic Avenger	1984	And the two 1989 sequels as well as its 2000 sequel.
The Stuff	1985	
Re-Animator	1985	And its 1990 and 2003 sequels.
Lifeforce	1985	
Deadly Friend	1986	
Spookies	1986	
Night of the Creeps	1986	
From Beyond	1986	
Street Trash	1987	
Prince of Darkness	1987	
RoboCop	1987	
The Kindred	1987	
Bad Taste	1987	
Hellraiser franchise	1987–present	
The Hidden	1987	
The Curse	1987	
Slugs	1988	
Dead Ringers	1988	
The Brain	1988	
The Kiss	1988	
Brain Damage	1988	
Beetlejuice	1988	
Akira	1988	
Nekromantik	1988	And its 1991 sequel.
The Nest	1988	
Society	1989	
Kamillions	1989	
Sweet Home	1989	
Tetsuo: The Iron Man	1989	And its 1992 and 2010 sequels.
Leviathan	1989	
Godzilla vs. Biollante	1989	
Jacob's Ladder	1990	
Baby Blood	1990	
Frankenhooker	1990	
Metamorphosis: The Alien Factor	1990	
Two Evil Eyes	1990	
Naked Lunch	1991	
Death Becomes Her	1992	
Candyman	1992	
Braindead	1992	
Freaked	1993	
Carnosaur	1993	
The X-Files	1993–2018	
Body Melt	1993	
Jason Goes to Hell	1993	
Cronos	1993	
Necronomicon	1993	
Return of the Living Dead 3	1993	
In the Mouth of Madness	1994	
Species	1995	As well as its 1998, 2004 and 2007 sequels
Godzilla vs. Destoroyah	1995	
Se7en	1995	
Neon Genesis Evangelion	1995–1996	
Naked Blood	1996	
Killer Condom	1996	
Thinner	1996	
Mimic	1997	
The Relic	1997	
Event Horizon	1997	
Wishmaster	1997	
Phantoms	1998	
Strangeland	1998	
The Faculty	1998	
eXistenZ	1999	
Virus	1999	
Audition	1999	
Idle Hands	1999	
Ginger Snaps	2000	
Ichi the Killer	2001	
Resident Evil (film series)	2002–2026	Based on the video game by the same name.
Cabin Fever	2002	
In My Skin	2002	
May	2002	
Dreamcatcher	2003	
Gozu	2003	
Infection	2004	
The Stepford Wives	2004	
Saw franchise	2004–present	
Art of the Devil	2004	As well as its 2005 and 2008 sequels.
Elfen Lied	2004	
Hostel	2005	And its 2007 and 2011 sequels.
Meatball Machine	2005	
Funky Forest	2005	
Slither	2006	
Poultrygeist: Night of the Chicken Dead	2006	
Taxidermia	2006	
Planet Terror	2007	
Teeth	2007	
Cloverfield	2008	
Tokyo Gore Police	2008	
Martyrs	2008	
One-Eyed Monster	2008	This crossover spoofs the films Jaws and The Thing.
Repo! The Genetic Opera	2008	
The Ruins	2008	
Splinter	2008	
Deadgirl	2008	
Splice	2009	
Book of Blood	2009	
District 9	2009	
Dread	2009	
Carriers	2009	
The Human Centipede (First Sequence)	2009	And its 2011 and 2015 sequels.
Black Swan	2010	
Generator Rex	2010–2013	
Repo Men	2010	
The Skin I Live In	2011	
Manborg	2011	
Marianne	2011	
The Victim	2011	
Tokyo Ghoul	2011–2014	
Excision	2012	
American Mary	2012	
Antiviral	2012	
Gravity Falls	2012–2016	
JoJo's Bizarre Adventure	2012-present	
Thanatomorphose	2012	
Under the Skin	2013	
The Green Inferno	2013	
Horns	2013	
Attack on Titan	2013–2023	
Contracted	2013	And Contracted: Phase II, released in 2015.
Clown	2014	
Parasyte	2014	
It Follows	2014	
Spring	2014	
Starry Eyes	2014	
Tusk	2014	
Baskin	2015	
Bite	2015	
Closet Monster	2015	After witnessing a gay bashing death in which the victim was impaled through the stomach with a metal rod, a closeted gay teenager hallucinates metal rods threatening to poke out of his own body whenever he confronts his own sexuality.
Are We Not Cats	2016	
The Autopsy of Jane Doe	2016	
Raw	2016	
Shin Godzilla	2016	
The Untamed	2016	
The Void	2016	
The Killing of a Sacred Deer	2017	
Kuso	2017	
Life	2017	
Mother!	2017	
Blue My Mind	2017	
Get Out	2017	
Annihilation	2018	
Devilman Crybaby	2018	
Overlord	2018	
Upgrade	2018	
Venom	2018	Based on the Marvel character of the same name.
Suspiria	2018	
Swallow	2019	
Color Out of Space	2019	
The Beach House	2019	
Friend of the World	2020	
Possessor	2020	
PG: Psycho Goreman	2020	
Playdurizm	2020	
The Sadness	2021	
Old	2021	Based on the graphic novel Sandcastle.
Titane	2021	
Antlers	2021	
Fang	2022	
Crimes of the Future	2022	
The House	2022	
Huesera: The Bone Woman	2022	
Nope	2022	
Swallowed	2022	
Men	2022	
Chainsaw Man	2022–present	
Infinity Pool	2023	
Grafted	2024	
I Saw the TV Glow	2024	
The Substance	2024	
The Ugly Stepsister	2025	
Together	2025	
Clayface	2026	Based on the DC character of the same name.

== Notable writers ==
In his introduction to The Mammoth Book of Body Horror, the film director Stuart Gordon says that "Body Horror has been with us since long before there were movies". According to the summary of this anthology, the important writers of body horror are:

- Mary Shelley
- Edgar Allan Poe
- H. P. Lovecraft
- John W. Campbell
- Gustav Meyrink
- George Langelaan
- Richard Matheson
- Stephen King
- Clive Barker
- Robert Bloch
- Ramsey Campbell
- Brian Lumley
- Nancy A. Collins
- Richard Christian Matheson
- Michael Marshall Smith
- Neil Gaiman
- James Herbert
- Christopher Fowler
- Alice Henderson
- Graham Masterton
- Gemma Files
- Simon Clark
- David Moody
- Axelle Carolyn
- Tony Vilgotsky
- H. G. Wells
- Harlan Ellison
- Andrew Joseph White

But others names could be quoted, according to Xavier Aldana Reyes in his book Body Gothic:

- Poppy Z. Brite
- Kathe Koja
- Dennis Cooper
- Bret Easton Ellis

== Notable graphic novels ==
Novel	Year	Description
The Visible Man (2000 AD)	1978–2012	Wherein a man suffers a nuclear waste accident, making his internal organs visible.
Akira	1982–1990	Cyperpunk manga series by Katsuhiro Otomo, who also provided the script for the anime film of the same name, based on the manga
Ed the Happy Clown	1983–2006	Wherein the titular character endures having the tip of his penis replaced with the head of Ronald Reagan.
Hino Horror	1983–2004	Later adapted into the Guinea Pig film series; features transformations and mutilation.
Druuna	1985–present	An infectious disease called "the Evil" lets peoples' bodies mutate into various forms which are not necessarily recognisable as humanoid.
Parasyte	1989–1994	Wherein human bodies are taken over by parasitic extraterrestrial organisms.
The Invisibles	1994–2000	Wherein the human converts of an invading interdimensional force are selected for "modification".
Ruins	1995	Wherein the Marvel universe goes horribly wrong, most notably Bruce Banner turning into a pile of tumors (and yet he's still alive).
Black Hole	1995–2005	Wherein a sexually transmitted disease gives teenagers in a small town grotesque mutations.
Uzumaki	1998–1999	Wherein humans distort into spirals.
Dorohedoro	2000–2018	People are alive due to magic after decapitation, fungi grow from people's bodies, etc.
Saya no Uta	2003–2013	Wherein the main character Fuminori has agnosia as known as "meat-vision".
Mai-Chan's Daily Life	2004	Wherein an immortal maid with regenerative abilities gets dismembered and disfigured in various ways.
Extremis	2005	Wherein a virus makes the body re-interpret itself as an open wound, thus forming a scab cocoon around the body.
PTSD Radio	2010–2018	Wherein a malevolent god called "Ogushi-sama" haunts various people by creating disturbing creatures and spirits out of human hair.
Animal Man	2011–2014	Part of The New 52 reboot, Animal Man features many body horror elements including grotesque mutations, disease and decomposition of animals, plants and humans alike.
Made in Abyss	2012–present	A massive pit causes numerous ailments for returning explorers, depending on depth. Past a certain point, grotesque transformations/mutations or agonizing death are all but certain.

== Use in video games ==
In recent years, the subjects of human experimentation, medical research, and infection have played large roles in video games whose plots are heavily influenced by themes common in body horror.

Video Game	Year	Description
Amnesia: The Dark Descent & Amnesia: A Machine for Pigs	2010 & 2013	The gatherer enemies are deformed human-like monsters; their eyelids are cut off and their bottom jaw is mutilated and stretched down and attached to their chests leaving their mouths permanently open.
BioShock series	2007–2014	Both BioShock and BioShock 2 consist of enemies called Splicers, who were once normal humans that were heavily mutated and driven insane from a drug called ADAM, which they used to re-write their genetic codes to develop "psychic" powers such as telekinesis and pyrokinesis. The game also contains the iconic Big Daddy, which is a man whose skin has been removed, and whose organs have been grafted to the inside of a modified deep-sea diving suit. BioShock Infinite uses a similar premise, although in this case series of compounds called Vigors grant the player extraordinary abilities; however, unlike ADAM they are consumed orally rather than injected. In this game, the Big Daddy has been replaced by the Handyman, a human whose spinal cord, head, and heart have been connected to a steampunk robotic frame with minor effects like psychological trauma.
Bloodborne	2015	
Corpse Party series	1996–2021	
Dead Space series	2008–present	The primary enemies of the series are called Necromorphs, which are mutated humans with protruding appendages, open wounds, and rotting flesh.
Fallout series	1997–present	The fallout games take place in a post-apocalyptic wasteland, and as such, many of the enemies and species have physical deformities from the radiation.
Half-Life series	1998–2007	Parasitic monsters known as Headcrabs attach themselves to heads of people and cause them to develop mutations such as elongated claws and gaping jaws in their chests.
Inside	2016	An indie puzzle platformer developed by Playdead. Inside tells the story about a young boy as he struggles against evil forces trying to take over the world. The boy infiltrates a massive facility where scientists perform mind-control and underwater experiments on human bodies.
Lisa: The Painful	2014	
The Last of Us Part II	2020	An action adventure/survival horror game set in a post apocalyptic world ravaged by a mutated fungus, transforming humans into hostile creatures with horrific body disfigurements. One such specimen consists of several infected humans fused together by the fungus called the Rat King.
Look Outside	2025	A survival horror game in which a strange cosmic phenomenon causes anyone who looks at it to grotesquely transform into a monster.
Outlast	2013	A first-person survival horror game in which an investigative journalist explores an asylum housing inmates displaying various degrees of bodily mutilation and/or mutation.
Parasite Eve series	1998–2010	The Squaresoft (now known as Square Enix) video game based on the 1996 Japanese SF horror novel of the same title, was released in 1998. The premise of both the novel and "cinematic RPG" being that the mitochondria, organelles from early aerobic bacteria that formed a symbiotic partnership with cells of most present-day multicellular eukaryotes, e.g. humans, are able to retain their separate identity as independent organisms in the form of cellular parasites. A dispersed intelligence, known as Eve, was able to take over the consciousness of certain individuals to make them reproduce and form an ultimate organism that will bring the downfall of humanity and other creatures alike. She can also turn organisms into monstrous beings.
Resident Evil series	1996–present	A pharmaceutical company uses a mutagenic T-Virus in order to produce monsters to sell as weapons. The most basic were zombie versions of whatever organism was infected or giant versions of insects. There are also human/insect and human/reptilian hybrids, malformed super-soldiers called "Tyrants", and various other mutants. Later games introduce, for example, more viruses, parasites like Las Plagas (an ancient parasite which take over nervous systems), and a superfungus called a Mold.
Scorn	2022	A first-person biopunk survival horror adventure game developed by Ebb Software.
Soma	2015	A SF survival horror game developed by Frictional Games.
Still Wakes the Deep	2024	A narrative psychological horror game developed by The Chinese Room and published by Secret Mode.
Struggling	2020	In this game, the player controls Troy, a fleshy creature that resembles two cojoined heads with a pair of long arms, which are used to drag through levels. During the game the player faces other similarly bizarre creatures known as "abomination gods" which serve as the main bosses of the game. The game as a whole has a body horror theme but it goes with a more comical approach and has an atypical cartoon art style.
The Thing	2002	A sequel to the 1982 film The Thing, player follows Captain Blake, a member of a U.S. Special Forces team sent to the Antarctic outpost featured in the film to determine what has happened to the research crew. The enemies encountered come in three main forms. "Scuttlers" are small Things formed from the limbs and appendages of infected personnel. "Walkers" are larger and much stronger than Scuttlers, and finally the Bosses are larger and much more powerful than Walkers.
Zoochosis	2024	A first-person survival horror indie game in which the player assumes the role of a zookeeper tasked with creating vaccines and curing mutated animals.

== Use in tabletop gaming ==
Traditional Game	Year	Description
Magic: The Gathering	1993–present	The basis of Phyrexia, an antagonist faction composed of assimilatory biomechanical undead. The Scars of Mirrodin block in particular focuses on this theme, in which assimilation and infection are emphasised upon, and Phyrexia has branched into all colours of mana, introducing new forms of mutilation. In the Shadows over Innistrad block, the gothic horror inspired setting of Innistrad undergoes a transformation; at first marked by subtle mutations in both the human and the already-monstrous living residents, it gruesomely distorts many of the plane's inhabitants in the image of the invading cosmic being, Emrakul.
Warhammer	1983–present	Mutation and bodily modification are emphasised upon in the Chaos factions.
Kingdom Death: Monster	2012–present	Monsters contain extensive incorporation of human body parts.

== See also ==
- Biopunk
- New French Extremity
- New Gothic
- Organ transplantation in fiction
- Psychological horror
