= Contracted: Phase II =

American horror film by Josh Forbes

- Theatrical release poster
- Directed by: Josh Forbes
- Written by: Craig Walendziak
- Produced by: J.D. Lifshitz; Raphael Margules
- Starring: Matt Mercer; Marianna Palka; Morgan Peter Brown
- Cinematography: Mike Testin
- Edited by: Ruben Sebban
- Production company: BoulderLight Pictures
- Distributed by: IFC Midnight
- Release dates: July 5, 2015 (Neuchâtel International Fantastic Film Festival); September 4, 2015 (United States)
- Running time: 78 minutes
- Country: United States
- Language: English

Contracted: Phase II is a 2015 American zombie-body horror independent film and the sequel to the 2013 film Contracted. The film was directed by Josh Forbes, based on a script written by Craig Walendziak.

Phase II features most of the actors and actresses from the original cast of the first film, and follows Riley (Matt Mercer) as he tries to find the man behind the sexually transmitted disease causing a viral outbreak in Los Angeles. The film had its world premiere on July 5, 2015, at the Neuchâtel International Fantastic Film Festival.

== Plot ==
After the events in the previous film, Riley (Matt Mercer) has begun showing symptoms of the same sexually transmitted disease that caused Samantha (Najarra Townsend) to turn into a zombie. Panicking, Riley decides that he needs to track down the person who first infected Samantha, BJ (Morgan Peter Brown), in the hopes of gaining a cure. Besides showing the same symptoms as Samantha, most of the people Riley loved the most were infected by the virus, especially his grandmother, Margie, Harper, and finally his pregnant sister, Brenda.

BJ has his own agenda, and is more than willing to continue to spread the disease to other victims. He is immune to the virus and continues to spread it to other victims. After having sexual intercourse with them, he injects the virus into their bodies before sending them home.

As Riley decides to cooperate with Detective Crystal Young (Marianna Palka), he succumbs to the disease and is killed by BJ, who was at the hospital trying to detonate a bomb to trigger a massive apocalypse by releasing other victims hospitalized there. As Riley is fully transformed into a zombie, he attacks BJ before Detective Young shoots him in the head.

In the mid-credits scene, BJ is shown to be alive, but hospitalized, while a doctor with an Abaddon tattoo (similar to BJ’s own) tells BJ, "Very soon, my friend, very soon".

== Cast ==
- Matt Mercer as Riley McCormick
- Marianna Palka as Detective Crystal Young
- Morgan Peter Brown as Brent "B.J." Jaffe
- Anna Lore as Harper
- Laurel Vail as Brenda
- Peter Cilella as James
- John Ennis as Special Agent Dalton
- Najarra Townsend as Samantha Williams
- Richard Riehle as "Deuce" Gelman
- Suzanne Voss as Margie
- Charley Koontz as Zain
- Alice Macdonald as Alice Patrick (archive footage)
- Ruben Pla as Doctor
- Caroline Williams as Sam's Mom (archive footage)
- Joanna Sotomura as Debbie

Also appearing in the film are Aaron Moorhead and Justin Benson as police officers, Adam Robitel and the film's second assistant director, Nic Birdsall as SWAT officers, Whitney Moore as a hooker, Jeffrey Reddick as a teacher, Ryan Ridley as an injured man, Charity Daw as an assistant nurse, Josh Edmondson as a Bio Doctor, Zach Zorba Grashin as an assistant doctor, and Josh Fadem and Elisha Yaffe as Mormons.

== Production ==
In April 2014, director Eric England had completed a draft of the script, titled Contracted: Phase II. In December 2014, the sequel was officially announced following the first film's success on VOD. England was not able to return due to his commitments to Get the Girl. Josh Forbes was brought in to direct the film, working from a new script by Craig Walendziak.

== Release ==
After debuting at the Neuchâtel International Fantastic Film Festival in July 2015, the film was released in selected theaters and on-demand on September 4, 2015, by IFC Midnight.

== Reception ==
Critical reception for Phase II was negative and the film holds a rating of 42% on Rotten Tomatoes, based on 12 reviews. Metacritic reports a score of 35 out of 100 based on 7 critic reviews, indicating "generally unfavorable" reviews.

Variety criticized the film, stating "Despite a couple of brief closing-credit epilogues suggesting future narrative directions, "Contracted: Phase II" feels too hurriedly conceived to expand on the original's premise in more than perfunctory fashion." Rogerebert.com panned Phase II and compared it unfavorably to its predecessor, writing that "Pointless body horror sequel "Contracted: Phase II" doesn't develop its predecessor's concepts so much as it resolves all of the questions you never needed answered." In contrast The Hollywood Reporter and The New York Times were more positive, and the Times praised Forbe's direction and visual effects.
