= Roadside =

Roadside may refer to:

- Road verge, a strip of greenery between a road and a sidewalk
- Shoulder (road), an emergency stopping lane by the verge of a road
- Roadside, Caithness, Scotland, a village
- Roadside (film), a 2013 American horror film
- Roadside (musical), a 2001 off-Broadway musical
- Roadside, a 1930 play by Lynn Riggs; basis for the musical
- "Roadside", a song by The Game from Born 2 Rap
- "Roadside", a song by Rise Against from The Sufferer & the Witness
- The Roadside, an EP by Billy Idol

== See also ==
- Minffordd (Welsh for "roadside"), a Welsh village
- Roadside attraction
