= CineMayhem =

Horror film festival in Los Angeles

- Location: Los Angeles, California
- Founded: 2013
- Hosted by: Heather Wixson
- Festival date: March 28–30
- Language: English
- Website: www.cinemayhemfilmfest.com

CineMayhem is a film festival that celebrates independent horror films.

== Background ==
CineMayhem, a film festival for independent horror films, was founded by Heather Wixson in association with Dread Central's Indie Horror Month. Wixson is a former contributor to Dread Central and currently now writes with Daily Dead. The first festival was presented in Thousand Oaks, California, and the inaugural date was March 2–3, 2013. The first festival was sponsored by Scream Factory, Sideshow Collectibles, Magnet Releasing, and Breaking Glass Pictures. The event is held at the Muvico theater, which Wixson arranged through connections from her hometown. An after-party at the Muvico takes place following the event. The festival is designed to offer a theatrical showing to independent films that would ordinarily lack the resources for one.

== Festival ==
=== 2013 ===
Sideshow Collectibles offered a $50 gift card to anyone who purchased a Saturday or Sunday pass. CineMayhem 2013 was the world premiere for Eric England's Roadside. Following its premiere, there was a Q&A session with England.

Lineup:

- Saturday
  - The Sleeper
  - Breath of Hate
  - Coldwater
  - Roadside
  - The ABCs of Death
- Sunday
  - Shorts: Foxes, Wrong Number, Familiar, Killer Kart, Him Indoors, Split the Check, Meet, The Root of the Problem
  - Behind the Mask: The Rise of Leslie Vernon
  - K-11
  - Resolution

=== 2014 ===
As of November 2013, submissions for the 2014 festival are currently open. The deadline is December 31, 2013.
