= Playdurizm =

2020 film directed by Gem Deger

- Directed by: Gem Deger
- Written by: Morris Stuttard
- Story by: Gem Deger
- Produced by: Martin Raiman; Steve Reverand
- Starring: Gem Deger; Austin Chunn; Issy Stewart
- Cinematography: Cédric Larvoire
- Edited by: Anssi Korhonen
- Music by: Petar Mrdjen
- Production company: The LAB Studios
- Distributed by: Artsploitation
- Release dates: 15 October 2020 (Lausanne Underground Film and Music Festival)
- Running time: 88 minutes
- Country: Czechia
- Language: English

Playdurizm is a 2020 erotic body horror film directed by Gem Deger. It had its world premiere in 2020 at the Lausanne Underground Film and Music Festival.

== Synopsis ==
When a teenager finds himself caught in a glitchy-glitzy reality with his onscreen male idol, he does all he can to be possessed by this man and ignore the violent clues of how he got there.

== Cast ==
- Austin Chunn as Andrew
- Gem Deger as Demir
- Issy Stewart as Drew
- Christopher James Adamson as Jeremy

== Reception ==
In his review for Screen Anarchy, Andrew Mack said the film is "it's certainly an unconventional feature film debut, written, directed and starring Deger. Officially it's been called in some places a neon-colored fantasy/romance/drama. Deger blends violence, romance, sex and wry moments of comedy into his compact tale. Small in concept and bold in color and style (...) I am definitely curious to see what this young filmmaker comes up with next."

On CBR, Cass Clarke said that "Playdurizm unwinds its devasting mystery slowly with gleeful amounts of macabre plot twists and plenty of techno color confidence". On Scared Sheepless, Caitlyn Downs gave it a 4/5 rating saying that it is "fiercely original, even when homaging some of the horror genre’s biggest hitters, Playdurizm stands out as a unique, affecting experience that deserves to be seen."

Ticiano Osório of Brazilian newspaper GaúchaZH listed it as one of his favorite films from Fantaspoa pt 2021.

== Awards and nominations ==
Playdurizm has received several awards and nominations at various film festivals:

- Best Feature Film Jury Prize at the 19th Lausanne Underground Film and Music Festival, 2020.
- Best Narrative Feature Film Jury Prize at the 18th Calgary Underground Film Festival, 2021.

== See also ==
- List of LGBT-related films of 2020
- List of body horror media
- List of horror films of 2020
