= Eric England (director) =

American film director

- Born: David Eric England; February 23, 1988 (age 37); Russellville, Arkansas
- Occupation(s): Director, screenwriter, producer
- Known for: Contracted

David Eric England (born February 23, 1988) is an American film director, producer, and screenwriter. He is known for writing and directing the body horror film Contracted (2013), and later Get the Girl (2017) and Josie (2019). England also produced and co-wrote Greenlight (2019) with Patrick Robert Young and Graham Denman.

== Filmography ==
- Hostile Encounter (2010)
- The Trick or Treater (2011)
- Madison County (2011)
- Trick or Treater: Part II (2012)
- Roadside (2013)
- Chilling Visions: 5 Senses of Fear (2013, Taste segment)
- Contracted (2013)
- Get the Girl (2017)
- Josie (2018)
