= Hanukkah (film) =

- Directed by: Eben McGarr
- Written by: Eben McGarr
- Produced by: James Balsamo; Robert L. Lucas; Eben McGarr; Christopher Ott; Felissa Rose
- Starring: Charles Fleischer; Sid Haig; Caroline Williams; P.J. Soles; Dick Miller
- Music by: Harry Manfredini
- Production company: My Way Pictures
- Release date: December 26, 2019
- Running time: 106 minutes
- Country: United States
- Language: English

Hanukkah is a 2019 American independent slasher film written, directed, and produced by Eben McGarr. The film stars Charles Fleischer, Sid Haig, Caroline Williams, P.J. Soles, and Dick Miller. The film is notable for being the first feature-length horror film to cover the holiday of Hanukkah, and for featuring the final on-screen performances of Haig and Miller before their deaths in 2019.

== Plot ==
Judah Lazarus, known as the Hanukiller, terrorized the streets of New York for each of the 7 days of Hanukkah in 1983. Judah, believing it was God's will, had intended to sacrifice his only son Obediah Lazarus to God on the 8th day of Hanukkah, before the police intervened in time to gun down Judah and save Obediah in the process. Now grown-up, Obediah has become consumed with hatred and a lust for vengeance, and begins a killing spree targeting non-Jews, bad Jews, and any perceived enemies of the Jewish faith. His next targets are a group of delinquent Jewish teens who, with the help of a Rabbi, deduce that the only way to stand a chance against the Hanukiller is to embrace their Jewish heritage and faith.

== Cast ==
- Charles Fleischer as Amon Feist
- Sid Haig as Judah Lazarus
- Caroline Williams as Ana Lazarus
- P.J. Soles as Mrs. Horowitz
- Sadie Katz as Rachel
- Victoria De Mare as Amanda
- Robert Felsted Jr. as Adam
- Toliver Harris as David
- Louise Rosealma as Judy
- Joe Knetter as Obediah Lazarus
- Thomas Miller as Young Obediah
- Dick Miller as Rabbi Walter Paisley

== Production ==
=== Development ===
Director Eben McGarr had been curious about Judaism and the festivities of Hanukkah before directing this film, despite having grown up in a Catholic household, and had noticed that there was no horror film centered around the titular holiday, saying: "I'm like inundated with Jewish culture [from] my friends and everything. I run horror events through Mad Monster and there are so many holiday horror films and there was just a serious lack of representation". McGarr had written the screenplay as far back as 2010, creating parody posters referencing Halloween (1978) and Friday the 13th (1980) to advertise the film in the meantime. McGarr had trouble securing funding for the film, primarily due to concerns from distributors and other filmmakers that the film could potentially be seen as disrespectful to Jews and the holiday, especially because McGarr is not Jewish himself. McGarr's sister's boyfriend at the time was of Jewish heritage and served as an on-set consultant. Most of the cast and crew for the film, including Sid Haig who also served as executive producer, were recruited after McGarr became acquainted with them at Mad Monster conventions. Felissa Rose of Sleepaway Camp (1983) fame came on board as a Producer to secure the necessary funding. Dick Miller, who had been retired by the time production commenced, came out of retirement simply to be able to play a Rabbi for the first time in his career. Principal photography took place in Los Angeles in September 2018.

== Release ==
Hanukkah was given a limited theatrical release on December 13, 2019 before going straight-to-VOD on December 20, followed by a Blu-ray and DVD release on February 20, 2020.

== Reception ==
Hanukkah received generally negative reviews. Writing for HellHorror.com, Michael A. praised the unique concept of using Hanukkah as the basis for a slasher film but criticized the formulaic slasher script, writing: "Hanukkah has all the ingredients for a weird, memorable cult horror flick — but it fails to rise beyond its gimmick. With a unique concept and a couple of horror icons on board, it could have been a satirical standout. Instead, it’s a confused, underwritten slog that’s unlikely to convert even the most forgiving slasher fans. For collectors of oddball holiday horror, it might be worth a one-time viewing — for everyone else, it’s a hard pass."

In one of the few positive reviews, Amylou Ahava for Killer Horror Critic wrote: "Even though the movie centers around the Jewish holiday of Hanukkah and presents predominantly Jewish characters, non-Hebrew speaking horror fans unaware of Jewish traditions can and should still enjoy this gruesome holiday feature. Expanding representation in horror will not only bring more fans to the genre but will still satisfy existing fans with a great film. Gore, cinematography, nods to 80s films, and some of the great names of horror movies, all combine to make this film a delightful slasher."
