= Scanners: The Showdown =

1995 film

- Promotional release poster
- Directed by: Steve Barnett
- Written by: Mark Sevi
- Produced by: Pierre David
- Starring: Daniel Quinn; Patrick Kilpatrick; Khrystyne Haje; Stephen Mendel
- Music by: Richard Bowers
- Release date: May 16, 1995
- Running time: 95 minutes
- Country: United States
- Language: English

Scanners: The Showdown (also known as Scanner Cop II: Volkin's Revenge) is a 1995 American science fiction film directed by Steve Barnett. It is the sequel to Scanner Cop and the fifth film in the Scanners series. Daniel Quinn returns as a psychic police officer who searches for a serial killer who targets other psychics.

== Plot ==
Sam Staziak is a Los Angeles police officer who is a Scanner, a person with extraordinary telepathic and telekinetic powers. Sam tracks a renegade Scanner, Karl Volkin, who recently escaped from a mental hospital. Volkin is building his power by siphoning off the power of other weaker Scanners. Years earlier, Staziak had captured Volkin, sending him to prison. He had also killed Volkin’s brother after they broke into a home. Volkin has sworn to siphon Staziak's power and kill him in revenge.

Investigating the deaths of a number of Scanners, Staziak realizes who is committing the atrocities, thanks to a sketch given to Staziak by his friend, Carrie Goodart, who has just survived an attack by Volkin. Goodart is also a Scanner. She was looking for Staziak’s mother, Rachel, when Volkin broke into the institute where she was working. Carrie attempted to scan him, though it was a futile effort, as she took Ephemerol regularly. It is a drug created in the 1940s to ease pregnancy pain and discomfort, but its main side effect was that it created Scanners. Scanners can take the drug to suppress their abilities and prevent them from going insane. Volkin scanned her in defense and retaliation, forcing her to end her own scan. He uses his powers to connect with the institution’s computer to look up the location of any known Scanners in the area.

While hunting Scanners, Volkin decides to kill Staziak’s mother, knowing it would cause Staziak a great deal of psychological pain. However, she preemptively jumps off of her porch, ending her own life. Upon hearing the news of his mother’s death, Staziak is devastated. He decides to take care of Volkin, once and for all. The two meet in a warehouse. Sam tricks Volkin with decoys, thereby weakening Volkin. In Volkin's momentary weaker state, Sam defeats Volkin by causing his head to explode.

== Cast ==
- Daniel Quinn as Samuel Staziak
- Patrick Kilpatrick as Karl Volkin
- Khrystyne Haje as Carrie Goodart
- Stephen Mendel as Detective Jim Mullins
- Barbara Tarbuck as Rachel Staziak
- Robert Forster as Captain Jack Bitters
- Steve Wilcox as Craig Volkin
- Allan Kolman as Tom Walton
- Robert Knott as Deputy Henry
- Tony Fasce as Pickpocket Jones
- Evan MacKenzie as J.J.

== Release ==
The film was released on VHS by Republic Pictures in May 1995. A DVD has been released in Canada with its predecessor.

The film along with its predecessor, was released on 4K Ultra HD and Blu-ray from Vinegar Syndrome in a double feature set on May 28, 2021.

== Reception ==
TV Guide rated the film 2/5 stars and called it "entertaining exploitation fare", though the review criticized the emphasis put on gory special effects. Writing for Bloody Disgusting, Daniel Baldwin wrote that it is not as good as Scanner Cop but is still entertaining for its gore and performances. Leonard Maltin's capsule review calls it an "effective, entertaining sequel".
