= Sex Weather =

- Directed by: Jon Garcia
- Written by: Jon Garcia
- Starring: Amber Stonebraker; Al’Jaleel McGhee
- Release date: November 27, 2018
- Running time: 89 minutes 90 minutes
- Country: United States
- Language: English

Sex Weather is a 2018 American romantic comedy drama film written and directed by Jon Garcia and starring Amber Stonebraker and Al’Jaleel McGhee.

== Plot ==
The morning after the premiere of his latest independent film, filmmaker Darrel (Al'Jaleel McGhee) wakes up in bed with Sydney (Amber Stonebraker), a crew member he has worked with closely. As the two talk through the events of the previous night — including the lukewarm critical reception of Darrel’s film — long-suppressed feelings begin to surface. Confined almost entirely to a single bedroom, the film follows Sydney and Darrel through an unfolding day of conversation, intimacy, and reflection, cycling between small talk, candid exchanges about love and relationships, and moments of physical closeness. Through these interactions, it gradually becomes clear that the two had the potential for a real relationship years earlier but never acted on it. Over the course of the day they confront past regrets and the possibility of a shared future, while grappling with the question of whether their connection is something lasting or simply the intensity of a fleeting encounter.

== Cast ==
- Amber Stonebraker as Sydney
- Al’Jaleel McGhee as Darrel

== Release ==
The film was released on DVD and VOD on November 27, 2018.

== Reception ==
Alan Ng of Film Threat awarded the film a 7 out of 10.

Katie Walsh of the Los Angeles Times gave the film a positive review and wrote, "The script has a certain memoiristic quality that would edge into self-indulgence if McGhee and Stonebraker weren’t such warm and disarming presences on screen."
