= Milkwater =

2020 American LGBTQ comedy drama independent film

- Film poster
- Directed by: Morgan Ingari
- Written by: Morgan Ingari
- Produced by: Candice Kuwahara
- Starring: Molly Bernard; Patrick Breen; Bryn Carter; Bianca Castro; Robin de Jesús; Ava Eisenson Ade Otukoya Jess Stark Michael Judson Berry Alexander Hodge Sean Rogers Nicholas Hiattas Bianca Castro Khalid Rivera Justin Crowley Bryn Carter Kea Trevett Rachel Joravsky Giana DeGeiso Jamie Rosler Brita Filter Elliott Halperin Tyler Joseph Ashton Marasciulo and Finnley Wan
- Cinematography: Maria Rusche
- Edited by: Chelsea Taylor
- Production company: Enfant Terrible Films
- Distributed by: Wolfe Releasing
- Release date: June 2020
- Running time: 101 minutes
- Country: United States
- Language: English

Milkwater is a 2020 American LGBTQ comedy drama independent film written and directed by Morgan Ingari, in her feature film debut. It stars Molly Bernard, Ava Eisenson, Patrick Breen, Bryn Carter, Bianca Castro and Robin de Jesús. The film had its world premiere at the Brooklyn Film Festival in June 2020, and had additional screenings at the Provincetown International Film Festival, Atlanta Film Festival and the Nashville Film Festival. The movie was released to streaming services on May 21, 2021. The film takes its title from the poem The Consecrating Mother by poet Anne Sexton. Ingari said she created the film with a team of entirely female department heads. Molly Bernard who stars in the film, also served as an executive producer. The movie was filmed on location in Brooklyn.

== Plot ==
Milo, a whimsical and emotionally impulsive 20-something living in Brooklyn, is in a phase of her life where everyone around her seems to be growing up except her. Her best friend Noor is pregnant and married to a supportive wife, and their life together is mature and stable. Milo’s other close friend and roommate George is also moving toward a more grounded adulthood, even beginning a serious romantic relationship. Surrounded by these milestones, Milo feels increasingly unmoored and invisible. Her own life lacks structure, direction, and deeper meaning.

After being left out of an important prenatal appointment with Noor, Milo is hit with a wave of loneliness and rejection. That night, she wanders into a gay bar to drink and distract herself. There, she meets Roger, an older gay man with a dry wit and a somewhat guarded personality. Roger is in his early 50s, lives alone, and works as a drag performer and bar owner. During a vulnerable moment, he shares with Milo his painful experiences trying to become a parent. He has been through failed adoption attempts and has been rejected by traditional surrogacy agencies due to his age and single status.

Struck by Roger’s sincerity and inspired by a spontaneous desire to be useful or meaningful in someone’s life, Milo impulsively offers to be his surrogate and egg donor. At first, Roger assumes she isn’t serious, but Milo insists. Despite his reservations, Roger agrees to move forward, and they proceed with the process through an at-home insemination rather than a clinic.

Milo’s decision is driven less by altruism and more by her need for connection and a deeper role in someone’s life. She romanticizes the idea of becoming part of a chosen family, imagining herself bonded to Roger and the child in a long-term, emotionally fulfilling way. She fantasizes about being Aunt Milo or even a co-parent of sorts, despite Roger making it clear from early on that he intends to raise the child alone.

As the pregnancy progresses, Milo begins to overstep boundaries. She becomes clingy, inserting herself into Roger’s life and acting as if their bond should be more personal and emotionally intense than Roger is comfortable with. Roger, who has always been fiercely independent, starts to grow uneasy with Milo’s emotional investment and her tendency to make the pregnancy about her own identity crisis.

At the same time, Milo’s other relationships begin to fray. Her friendship with Noor deteriorates as Milo becomes resentful of Noor’s seemingly perfect life and stable relationship. She tries dating someone new Cameron but her emotional immaturity and distraction with the pregnancy sabotage the connection before it can deepen. George, her roommate, gently tries to intervene, but Milo doesn’t take the advice well. She’s spiraling not because of the pregnancy itself, but because of what it represents her desperate attempt to matter to someone.

Eventually, things reach a breaking point. Milo confronts Roger after he begins setting firmer boundaries, including keeping her out of major decisions regarding the baby. She accuses him of using her and betraying the “bond” they shared. Roger, hurt but firm, reminds her that she volunteered for this role and was never promised a parental relationship. Their argument is raw and emotional, laying bare both of their insecurities, Milo’s need to feel indispensable, and Roger’s fear of being hurt again or losing control over something so important.

Following the confrontation, Milo begins a slow and painful journey toward self-awareness. She seeks therapy and starts to understand that her motivations for becoming a surrogate were rooted in her own unresolved issues, not just compassion. She makes amends with Noor and George, and begins to take small but meaningful steps toward creating a life of her own, one where she can feel whole without being needed by someone else.

In the final scenes, Milo has given birth and handed the baby over to Roger. There’s no grand reconciliation, but there is mutual respect. Roger acknowledges what Milo did for him, and Milo, in turn, finally accepts that her role in this story was to help bring a life into the world not to tether herself to someone else’s. She leaves with a newfound clarity and the quiet beginnings of emotional independence.

== Cast ==
- Molly Bernard as Milo
- Patrick Breen as Roger
- Robin de Jesús as George
- Ava Eisenson as Noor
- Ade Otukoya as Cameron
- Jess Stark as KJ
- Michael Judson Berry as Teddy
- Alexander Hodge as Kaz
- Sean Rogers as Tom
- Nicholas Hiattas as Felix
- Bianca Castro as Gigi Sordide
- Khalid Rivera as Jesus
- Justin Crowley as Ken
- Bryn Carter as Dr. Pierre
- Kea Trevett as Ashton
- Rachel Joravsky as Peyton
- Giana DeGeiso as Trivia Host
- Jamie Rosler as Trivia Host
- Brita Filter as Drag Queen #1
- Elliott Halperin as Clarice DuBoius /Drag Queen #2
- Tyler Joseph as Frank Antonio
- Finnley Wan as Eddie/Oler Lena
- Aston Marasciulo as Lilah

== Critical reception ==
Lorry Kikta at Film Threat rated the movie 7/10, and said the film is "quite funny and very well written and directed by Morgan Ignari [sic], and Molly Bernard is perfect in the role of Milo". David Rooney wrote in his review for The Hollywood Reporter that it is a "modest film that acquires pleasing depth as it progresses". He also noted that Ingari and Molly Bernard show a "warm understanding of a central character whose questionable choice sends her stumbling forward toward a new maturity...and an expertly gauged closing scene with just the right hint of sentiment maximizes the movie's strengths". Gary Kramer of Gay City News said Bernard plays Milo with the "right mix of spunk and insecurity"...and while Ingari's film may not "give its other queer characters enough development, they serve their purpose as foils for Milo". Overall, he said patience may be required for the film, but it is "ultimately worthwhile".

The Advocate wrote in their blurb that Ingari "explores the complexities of sexuality, parenthood, and emotional attachment with beautiful, and sometimes brutal honesty". They also called out Molly Bernard for her "brilliant" performance as Milo". Joey Moser wrote for Awards Daily that "Ingari balances a surprisingly emotional tale with sharp humor in...a winning comedy with a fantastic lead performance from Molly Bernard". Aidan Croft of SLUG Magazine said the film has "solid performances, with some tender scenes from Bernard and Breen in particular...it's well-paced, produced and feels comfortable to watch".

== See also ==
- List of LGBT-related films of 2020
