= Caroline Williams =

American actress

- Born: March 27, 1957 (age 69); Rusk, Texas, U.S.
- Occupations: Actress, producer
- Years active: 1975–present
- Known for: Days of Thunder; Blind; The Texas Chainsaw Massacre 2; Halloween II; Hatchet III

Caroline Williams (born March 27, 1957) is an American actress and producer. She is best known for her role as Stretch in The Texas Chainsaw Massacre film series. Her other film roles include Alamo Bay (1985), The Legend of Billie Jean (1985), Stepfather II (1989), Days of Thunder (1990), Leprechaun 3 (1995), How the Grinch Stole Christmas (2000), Halloween II (2009), and Hatchet III (2013). Williams has made guest appearances on several television series such as Hunter (1987), Murder, She Wrote (1992), ER (1996), Suddenly Susan (1996), Sabrina, the Teenage Witch (1997), The District (2003), and Grey's Anatomy (2010).

== Early life ==
Williams was born in Rusk, Texas on March 27, 1957. She attended high school in Little Rock, Arkansas, where she graduated in 1976. She later attended the University of Texas at Austin.

== Career ==
Williams made her film debut in the 1975 film Smile. A decade later, she starred in Alamo Bay and The Legend of Billie Jean. In 1986, Williams had small roles in Thompson's Last Run and Getting Even before portraying Vanita "Stretch" Brock in The Texas Chainsaw Massacre 2. In 1989, Williams starred in Stepfather 2.

In 1990, she reprised her role as Stretch for a brief cameo in the film Leatherface: The Texas Chainsaw Massacre III and also starred in Days of Thunder.

In 1995, Williams starred in Leprechaun 3. From the mid to late 1990s, Williams had guest appearances on several television series such as ER (1996), Suddenly Susan (1996) and Sabrina, the Teenage Witch (1997).

In 2000, Williams had a small role in How the Grinch Stole Christmas. She made a return to horror films in 2009 with a role in Rob Zombie's Halloween II and had a guest appearance on Grey's Anatomy the following year. In 2013, Williams starred in the horror films Contracted and Hatchet III. Other appearances include Martian Land (2015), Blood Feast (2016) and Fantasma (2017).

== Filmography ==
Year	Title	Role	Notes
1985	Alamo Bay	Diane	
1985	The Legend of Billie Jean	Woman in Pickup	
1986	Thompson's Last Run	Hooker	Television film
1986	Getting Even	Molly	
1986	The Texas Chainsaw Massacre 2	Vanita 'Stretch' Brock	
1987	Hunter	Sybil Taylor	1 episode
1987	L.A. Law	Mrs. Talbot	2 episodes
1988	Police Story: Monster Manor	Big Red	Television film
1989	Stepfather II	Matty Crimmins	
1990	Leatherface: The Texas Chainsaw Massacre III	Vanita 'Stretch' Brock	Cameo
1990	Love and Lies	Sammi	Television film
1990	Days of Thunder	Jennie Burns	
1990	They Came from Outer Space	Jessica	1 episode
1991	Sins of the Mother	Jennifer Coe	Television film
1991	Equal Justice	Roberta	1 episode
1991	Disney Presents The 100 Lives of Black Jack Savage	Christy Lawton	1 episode
1991	Shannon's Deal	Vivian	1 episode
1992	Sisters	Janet Kelso	1 episode
1992	Murder, She Wrote	Amanda North & Janet Weymouth	2 episodes
1992	Silk Stalkings	Caitlin Walsh	1 episode
1994	Flashfire	Ann	
1994	Deconstructing Sarah	Dottie	Television film
1995	Leprechaun 3	Loretta	
1995	Drifting School	Emily Scott	
1995	Models Inc.	Leslie Newcomb	2 episodes
1996	ER	Scrub Nurse	1 episode
1996	Suddenly Susan	Ms. Turner	1 episode
1997	Sabrina, the Teenage Witch	Gwendolyn	1 episode
1997	Mike Hammer, Private Eye	Janice Rhodes	1 episode
1998	Mike Hammer, Private Eye	Natural Rivers Now woman	1 episode
1998	Air America		1 episode
1999	Rage	B-Girl at the Elephant	
1999	Diagnosis: Murder	Maren	1 episode
2000	How the Grinch Stole Christmas	Tiny Who Woman	
2001	Family Law	Ms. Morton	1 episode
2003	NYPD Blue	Trish Braswell	1 episode
2003	Recipe for Disaster	Jason's Mom	Television film
2003	The District	Ruth Davies	1 episode
2004	The Division	Donna Estes	2 episodes
2007	Jane Doe: How to Fire Your Boss	Alana Devlin	
2007	Nip/Tuck	Mrs. Feeney	1 episode
2008	Women's Murder Club	Betsy Hammond	1 episode
2009	Halloween II	Dr. Maple	
2010	Grey's Anatomy	Alison Clark	1 episode
2010	Sebastian	Olivia Barnes	
2010	Monsterpiece Theatre Volume 1	Auntie D	Segment: "Rottentail"
2011	Don't Look in the Basement!	Nurse Karen Stephens	
2013	Hatchet 3	Amanda Fowler	
2013	Contracted	Nancy Williams	
2014	Blood Valley: Seed's Revenge	Mrs. McDonagh	
2015	Contracted: Phase II	Nancy Williams	
2015	Martian Land	Ulyana	
2016	Sharknado: The 4th Awakens	Stretch	
2019	Verotika	Peasant Woman	Segment: "Drukija Contessa of Blood"
2019	In Search of Darkness	Herself	Documentary film
2019	Blind	Sophia Lewis	
2019	Hanukkah	Ana Lazarus	
2020	Ten Minutes to Midnight	Amy Marlowe	
2020	In Search of Darkness: Part II	Herself	Documentary film
2022	Cuddly Toys	Mrs. Martin	
2023	Renfield	Vanessa	
2023	Doomsday Meteor	Stiles	
