= Stepfather II =

1989 psychological horror film directed by Jeff Burr

- Theatrical release poster
- Directed by: Jeff Burr
- Written by: John Auerbach
- Based on: Characters by Donald E. Westlake; Carolyn Lefcourt; Brian Garfield
- Produced by: William Burr; Darin Scott; Carol Lampman
- Starring: Terry O'Quinn; Meg Foster; Caroline Williams; Jonathan Brandis
- Cinematography: Jacek Laskus
- Edited by: Pasquale Buba
- Music by: Jim Manzie
- Production company: ITC Entertainment
- Distributed by: Millimeter Films
- Release date: November 3, 1989
- Running time: 93 minutes
- Country: United States
- Language: English
- Box office: $1.5 million

Stepfather II (also known as Stepfather II: Make Room for Daddy) is a 1989 American horror film directed by Jeff Burr and written by John Auerbach. It is a sequel to The Stepfather (1987) and stars Terry O'Quinn as the title character. The cast includes Meg Foster, Caroline Williams, and Jonathan Brandis.

Stepfather II received a limited theatrical release on November 3, 1989, and grossed $1.5 million at the box office. It received negative reviews from film critics. A sequel, Stepfather III, was released in 1993.

== Plot ==
After surviving being shot and stabbed at the end of the previous film, the man previously known as Jerry Blake is institutionalized in Puget Sound, Washington. He has meetings with his psychiatrist. Having gained his trust, he kills the psychiatrist and a guard. He dons the guard's uniform to help him escape, arrives at a train station, and kills and robs a traveling salesman for his car and money. He checks into a hotel, alters his appearance, assumes the identity of deceased publisher Gene F. Clifford, and travels to Palm Meadows, Los Angeles.

In Palm Meadows, Gene poses as a psychiatrist and soon meets single mother Carol Grayland and leases a house across the street from her and her 13-year-old son Todd. During a session with the neighborhood wives, Gene learns that Carol's husband Phil left his family the previous year. Gene begins courting Carol, eventually winning over her and Todd, but Phil returns, wanting to reconcile with his wife. Needing Phil out of the way, Gene persuades Carol to send him over for a meeting, during which Gene smashes a bottle on his head then stabs him to death. He covers up Phil's disappearance afterward by making it look like he simply ran off again. With Phil gone, Gene and Carol arrange to get married.

Matty Crimmins, local mail carrier and Carol's best friend, becomes suspicious of Gene and begins looking through Gene's mail. She finds a letter addressed to the real Gene Clifford (which includes a photograph revealing him to be African American). She confronts Gene, demanding to know who he really is. Gene persuades her to let him tell Carol the truth about his past. Later that night, after making love to Carol, Gene sneaks into Matty's house and strangles her to death, making her death look like a suicide. On his way out, Gene takes Matty's last bottle of wine and crosses through the yard of Matty's blind neighbor Sam Watkins, who hears Gene whistling "Camptown Races," which he mentions to Carol the next day.

Despite Matty's death, the wedding proceeds as planned. While dressing in the church, Carol recognizes bottles of wine sent by Matty's parents as the same brand Gene had the other night, and overhears Todd whistling "Camptown Races", which he says Gene taught him. Thinking Gene may have had something to do with Matty's death, Carol confronts him, prompting Gene to attack Carol and Todd, whom he locks in a storage closet. As Gene prepares to kill Carol with a knife she used to stab him, Todd breaks out of the closet and saves his mother, knocking the knife out of Gene's hand and stabbing him in the chest with a claw hammer, apparently killing him. As Carol and Todd walk into the wedding ceremony, everyone is shocked to see them covered in blood until Carol collapses on the floor. The film ends with Gene getting up, stumbling through the room for the wedding party and collapsing on the floor by the destroyed wedding cake, weakly uttering "Till death...", then seemingly dying from his wounds. In the extended version, after Carol and Todd are sent to recoveries, the scene shows that they are finally living happier and confident without Gene as they enjoy playing together in the park.

== Cast ==
- Terry O'Quinn as Jerry Blake/Gene F. Clifford/The Stepfather
- Meg Foster as Carol Grayland
- Caroline Williams as Matty Crimmins
- Jonathan Brandis as Todd Grayland
- Henry Brown as Dr. Joseph Danvers
- Mitchell Laurance as Phil Grayland
- Miriam Byrd-Nethery as Sally Jenkins
- Leon Martell as Ralph "Smitty" Smith
- Renata Scott as Betty Willis
- John O'Leary as Sam Watkins
- Glen Adams as Salesman
- Eric Brown as Hotel Attendant
- Bob Gray as Choir Singer
- Rosemary Welden as Video Date

== Production ==
The film was shot in December 1987 over the course of 25 days. When Jeff Burr was first hired to direct Stepfather II, it was shot with the intention of releasing it direct-to-video, but after seeing the final cut, ITC Entertainment cancelled the film's home video release in the hopes of securing it a theatrical run. Burr's biggest challenge in approaching the sequel was in trying to create a believable way The Stepfather could return following the definitive ending of the first film and stated the explanation required "a little bit of a leap" as he was clearly dead but now explained he had some life left in him. Burr stated that in addition to playing it more as a character based thriller (like the original) rather than a horror film, Burr also tried to add some humor and satire particular in regards to Reaganism and Mass media particularly in regards to TV commercials and self-help gurus that promised easy answers and quick fixes. ITC sold distribution rights to Miramax.

=== Post-production ===
After a test screening of the film, Miramax executives Harvey and Bob Weinstein complained about the lack of blood and demanded re-shoots. Jeff Burr refused and director Doug Campbell was hired to do the reshoots. In an interview, Burr commented, "they cut a little bit of [the film] out and they added some badly done blood effects. Badly done, because Terry O’Quinn refused to do it. Really, they were meaningless, so that was irritating."

== Release ==
=== Home media ===
After the film's theatrical release, it was released on VHS by HBO Video in the United States, and in Canada around the same time by Cineplex Odeon. In 2003, the film was released on DVD by Miramax Films and the same year in Canada by Alliance Atlantis; it included audio commentary with director Jeff Burr and producer Darin Scott. In 2009, to coincide with the release of the Screen Gems remake of the original Stepfather, Synapse Films re-released Stepfather II on DVD with special features including the ones available on the Miramax and Alliance Atlantis releases, as well as new features such as a making-of documentary.

== Reception ==
=== Box office ===
Stepfather II was originally intended to be released direct to video; however, the producers were impressed enough with the sequel that it was released into theaters. The film was given a limited release theatrically in the United States by Millimeter Films on November 3, 1989. It grossed $1,519,796 domestically at the box office.

=== Critical response ===
The film received mostly negative reviews, with a 14% approval rating from Rotten Tomatoes and an average rating of 4.40/10 based on 7 reviews. Variety stated "this dull sequel reduces the intriguing premise of the original Stepfather to the level of an inconsequential, tongue-in-cheek slasher film". Richard Harrington of The Washington Post wrote that the film was cliche-ridden and lacked the reality-rooted horror that made the original film effective, finishing his review by stating "Stepfather 2 is just slick marketing trying to capitalize on unsettling art - and failing badly, at that".

== Sequel ==
A sequel titled Stepfather III, was released in 1992.
