= Blind (2019 film) =

- Directed by: Marcel Walz
- Written by: Joe Knetter
- Produced by: Ivan Bernard Hruska; Ruediger W. Kuemmerle; Robert Lucas; Kristina Rust; Caroline Williams
- Cinematography: Thomas Rist
- Edited by: Kai E. Bogatzki
- Music by: Klaus Pfreundner
- Production company: Silent Partners
- Distributed by: Uncork'd Entertainment (US)
- Release date: July 10, 2019
- Running time: 88 minutes
- Country: United States
- Language: English

Blind is a 2019 horror film that was directed by Marcel Walz, based on a script by Joe Knetter.

== Synopsis ==
Faye is a successful actress whose career seems to only be on the rise. After receiving Lasik surgery, Faye is left totally blind and despondent, as her career seems to have dried up and she feels like she is unable to put her life back together.

Her mood is given a boost by her friends Sophia and Luke. Sophia is blind from birth, so unlike Faye, she does not feel a sense of loss for the sighted world. Luke is mute (but not deaf), and has unrequited feelings for Faye, which he feels can never be reciprocated, despite Sophia's encouragement.

Things take a turn for the deadly when a masked stranger begins to stalk Faye and murder the people around her.

== Cast ==
- Sarah French as Faye Dayne
- Caroline Williams as Sophia Lewis
- Tyler Gallant as Luke
- Jed Rowen as Pretty Boy
- Thomas Haley as Officer Jacobs
- Ben Kaplan as Sushi Boy
- Jessica Galetti as Lydia

== Production ==
Filming for Blind took place "almost a year before COVID". While filming Blind, Walz deliberately added colors and styles reminiscent of the giallo genre, as he wanted it to be "more of a horror/drama" than a "straight horror movie".

Actor Tyler Gallant was brought on to portray Luke, a mute trainer, and to prepare for the role he viewed documentaries, videos, and books that covered mute people and muteness.

== Release ==
Blind held a screening on July 10, 2019, in Beverly Hills, California for press and offered a limited amount of seating for general audience members. This was followed by an October 13, 2019, screening at the Festival of Fear and a digital screening the following year at FrightFest.

Blind was released to home video and VOD in the United States and United Kingdom on November 6, 2020.

== Sequel ==
In November 2020, Walz announced that there would be a sequel to Blind and that filming had been completed. He further stated that it would be a direct sequel, akin to the setup of Halloween and Halloween II, and would be called Pretty Boy.

== Reception ==
Critical reception has been negative, and Blind holds a rating of 43% on Rotten Tomatoes, based on 14 reviews. Horror website Dread Central and sci-fi magazine Starburst both rated the film favorably, with the latter remarking that the "creeping pace and that divisive, frustrating ending will piss a lot of people off, but this is easily, queasily, one of the most disturbing horror films this year."

JumpCut and Flickering Myth were more negative, both criticizing the script's dialogue and pacing.
