= Contracted (film) =

American horror film by Eric England

- Theatrical release poster
- Directed by: Eric England
- Written by: Eric England
- Produced by: Eric England; J.D. Lifshitz; Raphael Margules; Matt Mercer; Joshua Petrino
- Starring: Najarra Townsend; Caroline Williams; Alice Macdonald
- Cinematography: Mike Testin
- Edited by: Josh Ethier
- Music by: Kevin Riepl
- Production companies: BoulderLight Pictures; Southern Fried Films
- Distributed by: IFC Films
- Release date: July 7, 2013 (NIFFF)
- Running time: 84 minutes
- Country: United States
- Language: English
- Box office: $4,105

Contracted is a 2013 American zombie-body horror independent film written and directed by Eric England. It was first released on November 22, 2013, in the United States and stars Najarra Townsend as a young woman that finds herself suffering from a mysterious sexually transmitted disease after a rape. It has been compared to the 2012 film Thanatomorphose, with which it shares similarities. Twitch Film has criticized the movie for its marketing, in which England describes the character Samantha's rape as a "one night stand". Some of the cast from the first film reprise their roles in the 2015 sequel, Contracted: Phase II, written by Craig Walendziak and directed by Josh Forbes.

== Plot ==
In a morgue, a man named BJ with an Abaddon tattoo has sex with a corpse that has a biohazard symbol on the toe tag; afterward, he handles an empty test tube while washing up.

Samantha is trying to get over a recent break-up with her girlfriend, Nikki. The party's host, Alice, plies her with strong drinks, while Zain offers her drugs. After she becomes heavily inebriated, Samantha is approached by BJ, who offers her a drink. Even though she tells him that she is a lesbian, when she begins to black out, BJ takes her to his car and rapes her.

The following day, Samantha thinks she is suffering from a bad hangover. She bickers with her mother, who struggles to accept her daughter's lesbianism and is worried that she might have relapsed into hard drug use. Alice tells Samantha that the police are searching for BJ, whom Alice had never met. At the restaurant where she works, Samantha has trouble eating and is overly sensitive to noise. She can't hear her customers as they order their drinks. When she bleeds heavily from her vagina, she visits her doctor. Despite her protests that she is a lesbian who has not had sex with men for nearly a year, he is suspicious that she has contracted a sexually transmitted disease from heterosexual intercourse because of a rash that has developed in her groin. Samantha is also constantly vomiting and urinating copious amounts of blood. Eventually, a maggot falls out of her vagina in the bathroom without her noticing.

Samantha tries to repair her relationship with Nikki, who is rude to her. Samantha is hurt to learn that Nikki had not notified her that a scholarship offer had come in the mail. Meanwhile, her symptoms continue to worsen, with her eyes turning bloodshot and her hair falling out in clumps. On her way to her doctor, her work calls and says she needs to be at the restaurant until someone can come in for her. As she makes salad, her boss tells her to remove her sunglasses. Noticing her eyes, Samantha says she has pink eye. By this point, Samantha's condition had worsened to the point of her skin being pale, and she had developed dark blue veins on her face and a sore on the side of her lip. Returning to the kitchen, she notices something is wrong with her fingers. Samantha pulls a nail off. Then, a female customer screams after finding a fingernail in her salad. Samantha flees the restaurant and returns to her doctor, who advises her to avoid contact with other people until tests can determine the nature of her disease. Instead, Samantha visits Zain, who gives her heroin. When Alice arrives, she encourages Samantha to talk to the police about her encounter with BJ. Believing Alice wants to isolate her from her other friends, Samantha argues with her and storms off. Zain reveals to Alice that he sold Rohypnol to BJ at the party.

After a violent argument with her mother, Samantha turns to Nikki for consolation, but Nikki coldly rejects her and calls her sexually confused. Nikki tries to shut the door, but an enraged Samantha slams the door into Nikki's face before choking her to death. She then drives to Alice's in a rage, and Alice tells her to get out of her house and grabs a knife. Samantha says, "You finally have me," and they kiss. Samantha then vomits blood into her mouth. Alice runs away, but Samantha violently attacks her and murders her by biting into her throat and then hitting her with a blunt object. Losing her sanity, Samantha invites Riley, a man who had a crush on her, to Alice's house and seduces him. They engage in sexual intercourse, but Riley then comments feeling wet and tingly inside her, and then upon withdrawing his penis from her vagina, he sees an excessively abundant amount of bloody maggots fall out of Samantha's vagina and becomes repulsed. He then goes to the bathroom to vomit and inspect himself, including his groin and genitalia, which are covered in massive amounts of blood. While wiping himself, he opens the shower curtain and discovers Alice's body in the bathtub. Samantha flees the house. As she drives, she fades out of consciousness and is involved in a car crash. She emerges from the wreckage, transformed fully into a zombie. Her mother, who has arrived at the scene, begs the police not to shoot Samantha. As the police caution Samantha against moving, she lunges at her screaming mother.

== Cast ==
- Najarra Townsend as Samantha Williams
- Caroline Williams as Nancy Williams
- Alice Macdonald as Alice Patrick
- Katie Stegeman as Nikki
- Matt Mercer as Riley McCormick
- Charley Koontz as Zain
- Simon Barrett as Brent "B.J." Jaffe
- Ruben Pla as Doctor
- Dave Holmes as Therapist

== Production ==
England said that he began working on Contracted due to his wanting to "tell a story within the virus/infection subgenre like we've never seen before" and that he wanted to use sex as a plot device as it was something that "most people can understand and relate to". He wrote the film's script in March 2012 and shot Contracted during a 15-day period in Los Angeles in May of the same year, A plot has an inspiration for George A. Romero's 1978 film, Dawn of the Dead, and David Cronenberg's 1986 film, The Fly. England is a fan of Cronenberg's work, such as Rabid (1977). Casting for the film was difficult due to the limited funds, as well as some actors finding the film's content "too bold" or having scheduling conflicts. Veteran horror actress Caroline Williams was cast as the mother of the main character after England and film producer Matt Mercer approached her via her Facebook page.

England had initially planned to have the film center around the film's protagonist experiencing the loss of her virginity, but changed it to focus on a character that is uncertain of her sexuality and has a prior lifestyle different than the one she currently has. He had also initially planned to have the film set outside of the United States and focus slightly on xenophobia, but did not have the budget to accommodate this and as such, changed the movie's setting to Los Angeles.

== Release ==
Contracted at Neuchâtel International Fantastic Film Festival on July 7, 2013. IFC Films released it in the United States in theaters and video on demand on November 22, 2013, and on DVD on March 18, 2014.

== Reception ==
Rotten Tomatoes, a review aggregator, reports that 47% of 15 surveyed critics gave the film a positive review; the average rating was 4.8/10. Metacritic rated it 48/100 based on 5 reviews.

Rob Staeger of The Village Voice wrote the film moves from moralizing to under-explored themes while remaining full of stereotypical characters. Fangoria compared Contracted to the similarly plotted Thanatomorphose, saying that while both had a similar premise, Contracted's "visual palette is relatively conventional" in comparison. In a mixed review, Andy Webster of The New York Times wrote that the "ending to this fable misses the opportunity for broader metaphorical resonance, but getting there has its own unnerving rewards". In contrast, Martin Tsai of the Los Angeles Times stated that while the film was "absurd" it was also "compelling" and that it would play well off of the unrelated 2013 film Blue Is the Warmest Colour. Staci Layne Wilson of Dread Central rated it 2.5/5 stars and wrote the film is neither body horror nor a zombie film but simply a gross-out film. Dennis Harvey of Variety called it "a body horror opus" whose vague themes and unlikeable characters are not readily discernible as intentional.

Ben Croll of Twitch Film criticized the film's marketing, which depicts a one-night stand that is opposed by an unambiguous depiction of rape in the film. However, Croll states that the major themes of the film are denial and self-deception, which color Samantha's own perception of the incident.

== Sequel ==
A sequel titled Contracted: Phase II, written by Craig Walendziak and directed by Josh Forbes, was released in the United States on September 4, 2015.
