= M. Phil Senini =

American actor

- Born: April 23, 1953 (age 72); Burley, Idaho, United States
- Occupations: Actor screenwriter production associate
- Years active: 1977–1991
- Spouse: Gina L. Piellusch (m. 2007–2013; divorced)
- Children: 1

Madison Phil Senini (born April 23, 1953, in Burley, Idaho), professionally known as M. Phil Senini, is an American actor, screenwriter and production associate.

== Career ==
In 1977, Senini made his acting debut by playing the small role of a sharpshooter in the World War III threat film, Twilight's Last Gleaming. In 1979, Senini and Jerry-Mac Johnston co-wrote the lyrics to a song for the stage play, The Devil You Say, with music by Tom W. Cranson. There was a break in his Hollywood career until 1986, at which time he co-wrote the screenplay for the action movie, Getting Even, which starred Edward Albert. Again, there was a break in Senini's career until the early 1990s, when he was a production associate for the TV movies: A Mom for Christmas (1990) and Death Dreams (1991). Since May 2005, he has served as manager of sector communications for Northrop Grumman Integrated Systems.

== Personal life ==
On April 13, 2007, Senini married Gina L. Piellusch. They divorced in 2013. The couple had one child together. Senini currently resides in McLean, Virginia.

== Filmography ==
=== Film ===
Actor

Year	Title	Role	Notes
1977	Twilight's Last Gleaming	Sharpshooter	acting debut

Screenwriter

Year	Title	Credit	Notes
1986	Getting Even	screenwriter	co-wrote with Eddie Desmond, Michael J. Liddle & Dwight H. Little

=== Television ===
Production associate

Year	Title	Credit	Notes
1990	A Mom for Christmas	production associate	TV movie
1991	Death Dreams	production associate	TV movie
