= Getting Even (1986 film) =

1986 film by Dwight H. Little

- Directed by: Dwight H. Little
- Written by: Eddie Desmond; Michael J. Liddle; Dwight H. Little; M. Phil Senini
- Starring: Edward Albert; Audrey Landers; Joe Don Baker; Caroline Williams
- Cinematography: Peter Lyons Collister
- Edited by: Charles Bornstein
- Music by: Christopher Young
- Production company: AGH Productions
- Distributed by: American Distribution Group
- Release date: February 28, 1986 (U.S.)
- Running time: 90 minutes
- Country: United States
- Language: English
- Budget: $2.2–2.8 million

Getting Even is a 1986 American action thriller film directed by Dwight H. Little and starring Edward Albert, Audrey Landers, Joe Don Baker and Caroline Williams. The story concerns an extortion plot which threatens to engulf the city of Dallas in a cloud of corrosive military gas. It is also known as Hostage: Dallas in some international markets, which was its working title.

== Plot ==
A soldier-of-fortune, "Tag" Taggar, steals some Russian nerve gas from Afghanistan, and brings it to the U.S. to be analyzed. A greedy millionaire rancher, King Kenderson, finds out about it, steals it and uses it in an extortion scheme. Taggar teams up with Paige Starson, an FBI agent, to put an end to his plans.

== Cast ==
- Edward Albert as "Tag" Taggar
- Audrey Landers as Paige Starson
- Joe Don Baker as King R. Kenderson
- Rod Pilloud as Doc
- Billy Streater as Ryder
- Blue Deckard as Kurt
- Dan Shackleford as Roule
- Caroline Williams as Molly
- Woody Watson as Max
- Joe Asberry as Potts

== Production ==
=== Development ===
Producer Mike Liddle and oil heir Al Hill Jr. were tennis teammates in their youth. They reconnected in 1980, when Liddle was hired by Hill thanks to his qualifications as a pilot and plane broker. Hill had started investing in others' films and, in 1984, decided to create his own outfit AGH Productions, drafting Liddle to manage its operations. This was the company's first feature. Hill devised the basic premise, drawing inspiration from the Bhopal chemical disaster. Liddle then crafted a synopsis showcasing the various aircraft they had access to, before commissioning M. Phil Senini to turn it into a full script. Although Liddle said that the decision to use their own assets came down to cost cutting, director Dwight Little has described the film as a "vanity project." According to Albert and Baker, the script was originally very poor, but characters were beefed up through rewrites. Dwight Little was hired because he was not a union director. As the film was bigger than his previous ones, he storyboarded it entirely.

=== Casting ===
Edward Albert was recommended by the film's casting agent. In the script, his character had a boxing background, but he did not feel he could learn the sport so quickly, so his real-life kenjutsu experience was incorporated instead. Although Audrey Landers' European singing career was given as the reason for her casting, she was also Hill's girlfriend at the time. Texas-born Joe Don Baker was hired by Alan Belkin, another executive working for Hill, who had already held talks with the actor at his previous company, American Cinema Group. Supporting players were primarily local, which was more economical. Landers helped rounding up the cast thanks to connections stemming from her run on Dallas.

=== Filming ===
Film started on July 8, 1985, and extended into August. AGH used the legal entity Tyler Productions for the shoot. 84 percent of the crew hailed from Texas. Temperatures were frequently in the 100 to 115-degree range, even at night, and a rare brand of makeup had to be ordered to cope with the sweat. The opening scene was filmed at a sand pit dug for the occasion in Seagoville. Two weeks were spent at Twin Gates, a ranch owned by the Knapp family in Mansfield, which represented the villain's home base. The interior was partially refurbished for the picture. The crew also visited Dallas landmarks such as a rollercoaster at Fair Park, the Mary Kay headquarters, and Reunion Tower. The climactic helicopter chase was filmed above Trinity River.

While Landers received props for her on-set attitude, Baker was more difficult to work with. He balked at taking instructions from the weapons coordinator on the basis of his lengthy career, drank a lot, and did not like to work too early or too late, so most of his scenes were bunched up in the afternoon. Albert lost his mother, Margo, during production. The budget was reported as $2.2 million in the local press, and $2.8 million in trade magazine Variety. Early coverage suggested that some filming would take place in Austin and Marshall, but no further mention of this could be found.

=== Stunts ===
Belkin brought on veteran stunt coordinator Paul Baxley, whom Little credits with maximizing the film's limited resources. The Reunion Tower scene was made possible by Hill's relationship with the owners of the restaurant located on top of the building. Albert performed the entire climbing sequence himself, although other stunts, such as the helicopter finale, proved too dangerous. Landers was doubled by Texan former track and field athlete Jamie Bunch. The son of Twins Gates' owner, a young rodeo rider, was enlisted for the filming of the horseback takedown. The weapons coordinator was a local firearms importer. The machine gun wielded by the hero is a Belgian FN Minimi, which was not widely available in the U.S. at the time.

== Release ==
=== Pre-release ===
The film's sales were handled by The Samuel Goldwyn Company.

=== Theatrical ===
By the end of 1985, a new title was considered but not yet determined. The film's opening was then planned for February 21, 1986. Now renamed Getting Even, it was given a charity premiere at the Loews Anatole hotel in Dallas on February 25, 1986. It opened at select Texas locations on February 28, 1986. The poster for those early screenings boasted a more lighthearted artwork than the one seen during the rest of the film's run. It debuted in New York City on May 1, and in Los Angeles on May 16. It was the second release from American Distribution Group, which was also backed by Al Hill Jr.

The movie received a limited theatrical release in the U.K. No London dates could be found, but it opened at a Cannon Cinema in Manchester on September 12, 1986. The title Hostage: Dallas was retained in Europe.

=== Home media ===
Getting Even arrived on domestic videocassette in the third week of January 1987 through Vestron Video. Hill turned town at least two pre-sales before accepting Vestron's offer. In the U.K., the film was released on September 26, 1986, by Virgin Video.

== Reception ==
The film has received largely negative reviews. Michael Price of the Fort Worth Star-Telegram was supportive of the local movie. He deemed it proof that resource optimization "can add up to a greater-than-the-sum challenge to Hollywood," and found the film "on a more or less even keel with such recent entries as Remo Williams: The Adventure Begins, Black Moon Rising and F/X." He further praised "straight and earnest" acting, as well as Little's "fast and tight direction." Joe Kane, the New York Daily News' resident genre columnist, assessed: "Unlike so many flaccid contempo "action" pics, Getting Even really delivers the junk movie goods. It's an enjoyable dumb, fast-paced throwback to the pulp serials of yore." Gary Curtis of The Hamilton Spectator called the movie "bad" yet "wonderfully tacky", adding that "[e]verything — the casting, the dialogue, the smarmy special effects, the ultra low-tech feel — are so good-naturedly off-kilter that one just has to smile, if not guffaw."

Michael Wilmington of the Los Angeles Times wrote it felt like "the first multimillion-dollar 'R' movie written entirely by 10-year-olds", sunk by a "rotten" storyline, "deliberately [paced]" dialogue and "terrible, or indifferent, performances." Candice Russell of the South Florida Sun Sentinel wrote that "Getting Even is a B-movie, timely in theme, pathetic in credibility," and hampered by "deathless dialogue" and a story that "can't be credited with a lot of imagination." She did concede that "[d]irector Dwight Little does a workmanlike job, especially during the action scenes." Writing for The Miami Herald and Knight Ridder papers, Bill Cosford called the film a "slack and roughly made" effort, whose "sole relief comes from the performance by Baker." Jerry Roberts of the San Pedro News-Pilot lambeasted it as "hack work at its most pathetic and insulting," "with a stewing of themes and action scenes that badly rip-off bad television shows."
