= Thanatomorphose =

Canadian horror film by Éric Falardeau

- Directed by: Éric Falardeau
- Written by: Éric Falardeau
- Starring: Kayden Rose, Émile Beaudry, Eryka Cantieri, Roch-Denis Gagnon
- Cinematography: Benoît Lemire
- Edited by: Benoît Lemire
- Production companies: Black Flag Pictures, ThanatoFilms
- Distributed by: Bounty Films
- Release date: October 2, 2012
- Running time: 100 minutes
- Country: Canada
- Language: English

Thanatomorphose is a 2012 Canadian body horror film directed by Éric Falardeau, which is his directorial debut. It was first released on October 2, 2012, in Spain and has been shown at several film festivals since then, including the Fantasia Film Festival. Thanatomorphose stars Kayden Rose as a young woman that finds her body slowly rotting from a mysterious ailment.

== Plot ==
Laura is a depressed and introverted young woman who lives alone in her small apartment. After she has sex with her abusive boyfriend Antoine, Laura bandages his foot after he is injured by stepping on a sharp nail on the floor, revealing that she is a nurse. He is often distant from her and always leaves after they have sex. She is distracted unpacking several boxes and masturbates, after which a red spot appears on her groin. When she takes a shower, one of her fingernails falls off and a new purple stain appears on her back. She starts preparing for a party after leaving work and her friends arrive. Her cleaning mania is exposed when they dirty the floor and Laura ends up being mocked by her friends for it. Julian, one of their friends, seems sexually interested in Laura.

After Laura's friends leave, Antoine forces her into aggressive sex. Later that night, she falls ill in the middle of the night and vomits all over him. Laura staggers into the bathroom and ends up breaking a glass, scattering its shards on the floor. Laura wakes up naked without Antoine by her side. She goes to drink water from the sink and fails to notice that the drain is full of her blood. After she steps on shards of glass from last night, she slips and hits her head on the floor. She dreams of a rotting carcass in an advanced decomposition state. She wakes up at night with a pool of blood from the wound on the back of her head. After bandaging herself, she takes some medication and is visited by Julian, who notices the bruises all over her naked body. She performs oral sex on him, and after he leaves, Laura spends the rest of the day sleeping.

Laura wakes up in the morning with difficulty and defecates standing up before passing out again. She dreams that she is being operated on in a clandestine laboratory by a doctor who is cutting off her hand to feed Antoine and Julian, both naked in a cage. Laura wakes up even weaker and with her skin getting even more decomposed. She tries to take a shower and clean her open wounds, but it does not do much good. She performs a suture to close a rotten wound on her hand, covering it with a bandage as soon as more of her nails fall out. After noticing that her head injury is not improving, she covers all the windows and mirrors with black sheets.

Laura begins to collect the parts of her body that are falling off, along with tufts of hair and bits of her fingers, into jars. She photographs its evolution and starts using its body parts to make bloody sculptures. Laura masturbates while remembering that Antoine visited her and seeing her deplorable condition, tried to help her wash up. Antoine ends up being killed by her with several hammer blows to the head; as she recalls this while masturbating, she bleeds. Her apartment begins to display traces of black blood and flesh scattered throughout. She examines herself in the mirror and removes some maggots from her raw chest with tweezers without feeling pain.

The next day, she develops the photographs and orders the pots with her pieces. She calls Julian to visit her and when he does, he sees her rotting body on the mattress, begging him to have sex with her. Julian refuses and is stabbed to death by her. Her state of decomposition worsens and her skin turns black with maggots surrounding her flesh, and she has a psychedelic dream of being buried in a coffin. She makes one last sculpture with pieces of Julian and herself, ripping off parts of her skin to complete her artwork. She looks at herself in the mirror one last time and stabs her milky eyes with her fingers, blinding her, before crawling closer to Julian's and Antoine's rotting bodies. As she crawls, the final stages of rot take hold and rancid flesh oozes from her bones. Her remaining flesh slips off her bones and her movements become slower and more painful. She releases a final ghastly wail before her jaw detaches from her skull and she collapses and dies, leaving a lifeless bloody skeleton slumped on the floor.

== Cast ==
- Kayden Rose as Laura
- Davyd Tousignant as Antoine
- Émile Beaudry as Julian
- Karine Picard as Anne
- Roch-Denis Gagnon as Stephan
- Eryka Cantieri as Marie (as Eryka L. Cantieri)

== Reception ==
Critical reception for Thanatomorphose was mixed. The film has been compared to Contracted, a similarly plotted film released in 2013. Ain't It Cool News gave a mixed review that praised the film's special effects but warning that the film would not appeal to all audiences due to its content. Fearnet gave a similar review, saying that it was "not the kind of horror film I'd want to watch every week – and I may even find it difficult to recommend – but I'd be lying if I said Thanatomorphose didn't fascinate, aggravate, and impress me at the same time." Dread Central panned the movie, giving it one and a half blades and criticizing it as "all grue, little substance".

=== Awards ===
- Best Movie Award, XXX Festival de Cine de Terror de Molins de Rei (2012)
- Best Special Effects Award, A Night of Horror International Film Festival (2012)
- Best Film, Best Director, Best Actress, Most Repulsive Flick Awards, Housecore Horror Film Festival (2013)
- Best Horror Film, The Philip K. Dick Film Festival (2013)
- Best Special Effects Award, Horrorant Film Festival 'FRIGHT NIGHTS' (2014)

== See also ==
- Contracted
- Bite
