= Scanner Cop =

1994 film by Pierre David

- Official DVD cover
- Directed by: Pierre David
- Screenplay by: George Saunders; John Bryan
- Story by: Pierre David
- Based on: Characters by David Cronenberg
- Produced by: Pierre David
- Starring: Daniel Quinn; Darlanne Fluegel; Richard Lynch; Richard Grove; Mark Rolston
- Cinematography: Jacques Haitkin
- Edited by: Julian Semilian
- Music by: Louis Febre
- Production company: Image Organization; Malofilm; Republic Pictures; Starlight Film
- Distributed by: Malofilm (Canada); Cine Plus (Germany); Republic Pictures (US)
- Release date: July 27, 1994
- Running time: 95 minutes
- Country: Canada; Germany; United States
- Language: English

Scanner Cop is a 1994 science fiction action horror film. It is the fourth film in the Scanners series and the first of two films in the Scanner Cop sub-series. It is written, produced, and directed by longtime series producer Pierre David, and stars Daniel Quinn, Darlanne Fluegel, Mark Rolston and Richard Lynch. It was released direct-to-video in March 1994.

== Plot ==
A Scanner (a person with special telepathic and telekinetic abilities) goes crazy and is shot by officer Pete Harrigan (Richard Grove). Harrigan discovers the Scanner had a child and adopts him. 15 years later, Harrigan leads the Los Angeles Police Department. His adopted son, Sam Staziak (Daniel Quinn), is a rookie in the department. Staziak is also a Scanner, although he keeps the powers hidden.

Dr. Karl Glock (Richard Lynch) is a psychiatrist. He is also a cult leader, and he brainwashes individuals to kill police. As the string of murders begins to decimate the police department, Sam faces sensory overload and possible insanity as he reluctantly uses his powers to hunt the man responsible for the killings.

Sam scans the memories of a coroner (Gary Hudson) who committed suicide. This provides clues to find Glock. Police psychiatrist Dr. Arden discovers puncture marks, indicating those who have been killing officers were drugged. A scan by Sam of a wife who killed her police officer husband shows the drug makes the victim see a giant version of whatever phobia they have.

Glock traps Sam, but Sam escapes. Sam attempts to scan Glock, but he is blocked by a metal plate in Glock's head. Glock attempts to pose as Harrigan's surgeon, but Sam telekinetically removes the plate from Glock's head, killing him.

== Cast ==
- Daniel Quinn as Samuel Staziak
- Richard Grove as Commander Peter Harrigan
- Darlanne Fluegel as Dr. Joan Alden
- Mark Rolston as Lieutenant Harry Brown
- Richard Lynch as Karl Glock
- Hilary Shepard as Zena
- Luca Bercovici as Dr. Krench
- Gary Hudson as Damon Pratt
- Savannah Smith Boucher as Margaret Harrigan
- Cyndi Pass as Sarah Kopek
- Ben Reed as Rick Kopek
- Billy Williams as Eightball
- Wayne Grace as Officer Dooley
- Darren Dalton as Officer Longo
- Craig Hamann as Officer Gorman

== Production ==
The film was the directorial debut of Pierre David, who had produced the first three Scanners films as well as David Cronenberg's Videodrome.

Unlike the previous films, which were all shot in Canada, Scanner Cop was shot in the United States with an American cast. Filming occurred in Los Angeles.

== Release ==
The film was released on VHS and LaserDisc by Republic Pictures. A DVD has been released in Canada, along with the sequel Scanners: The Showdown (also known as Scanner Cop 2).

The film along with Scanners: The Showdown was released on 4K Ultra HD and Blu-ray from Vinegar Syndrome in a double feature set on May 28, 2021.

== Reception ==
Empire rated it 2/5 stars and described it as a "moderately enjoyable horror movie, that suffers for its cast and script". TV Guide rated it 2/4 stars and wrote that the film "works as a solid exploitation item", though it criticized the police procedural aspects. It noted that Glock should have been given more screen time. Glenn Kenny of Entertainment Weekly, in an article critiquing recent direct-to-video releases, rated it D+ and called the plot an excuse for "gruesome special effects".

Writing for Bloody Disgusting, Daniel Baldwin praised the film for taking the Scanners series in a new direction, describing it as "a tightly-written and paced cop thriller". Moria gave the film two stars, found it not a dire as the other films in the franchise, and it was competently made but otherwise found it pedestrian.

== Sequel ==
Scanner Cop II: Volkin's Revenge, also known as Scanners: The Showdown, was released in 1995.
