= Jon Garcia (director) =

American director, documentary filmmaker, screenwriter and musician

- Born: Jon Erich Garcia; July 18, 1979 (age 47); Corpus Christi, Texas
- Education: Our Lady of the Lake University; University of Texas; Portland State University
- Occupations: Filmmaker; Screenwriter; Musician
- Years active: 2005 - present
- Website: Official website

Jon Erich Garcia (born July 18, 1979) is an American director, documentary filmmaker, screenwriter and musician based in Portland, Oregon. He has released two full-length albums and produced ten feature films including The Falls trilogy, Sex Weather and Love in Dangerous Times. Garcia was nominated at the Emmy Awards in 2016, for his works for Oregon Public Broadcasting.

== Biography ==
=== Early life and education ===
Garcia was born to Alma Gloria and Domingo Serio Garcia, Jr., in 1979, in Corpus Christi, Texas. His mother was a school teacher and his father was a Vietnam veteran. He attended Gregory-Portland High School and graduated in 1998. Later, Garcia attended Our Lady of the Lake University and University of Texas where he studied psychology. He also attended Portland State University where he graduated in film studies, in 2009.

=== Career ===
In 2005, Garcia moved to Portland, Oregon where he began his professional music career by joining a regional band Slackjaw as a singer and guitar player. In 2006, he released his self-titled debut album Jon Garcia. The album received positive to mixed reviews from multiple news agencies including The Oregonian and AllMusic. After the release of the album, Garcia went on several international and national tours including a solo tour in the United Kingdom where he was interviewed by the BBC in 2007. A song from the album, "Heart Shaped Skeleton Keys", was placed in rotation nationally by BBC Radio. In 2008, Garcia released his second album The Lake.

In 2010 after graduating from Portland State University, Garcia wrote screenplay and produced his first indie film, Tandem Hearts. Stan Hall from The Oregonian called the film "[sic] a straightforward, very watchable if a bit overlong drama". Later that year, Garcia launched Lake Productions, an independent film production and distribution company.

While Tandem Hearts was in post-production, Garcia wrote the screenplay of his second film, The Falls which was also released in 2010. The Falls was part of Vancouver Queer Film & Video Festival and starred Nick Ferrucci and Benjamin Farmer. The film went on to appear in more than ten film festivals.

In 2012, Garcia moved to Seattle where he wrote and produced The Hours Till Daylight, a supernatural thriller featuring Vannessa Vasquez, Quinn Allan, Sarah Jannette Parish and the former MLB player Carlos Sepulveda. The next year, in 2013, Garcia produced the sequel to The Falls, titled The Falls: Testament of Love. The sequel received positive reviews in the alternative press.

Garcia collaborated with Rodney Moore and wrote the screenplay of The Falls: Covenant of Grace in 2016. This was the final installment of the trilogy featuring Nick Ferucci, Ben Farmer, Curtis Edward Jackson and Rebecca Karpovsky. The film premiered in the Seattle Queer Film Festival in October 2016.

In October 2018, Garcia collaborated with Matt Alber and co-directed a documentary film named Room To Grow. The film chronicles the stories of seven LGBTQ+ teens and families. Stephan Farber from The Hollywood Reporter called Room to Grow "[sic] fresh, compelling stories to tell in this rousing and eye-opening film".

In November 2018, Garcia directed and produced Sex Weather starring Amber Stonebraker and Al'Jaleel McGhee. The film received positive reviews from the Los Angeles Times.

In October 2020, Garcia produced and directed Luz, a crime film starring Ernesto Reyes and Jesse Tayeh. Later that year, he produced Love in Dangerous Times, a romantic drama revolving around the COVID-19 situation in Portland, Oregon. Love in Dangerous Times was shot during the lockdown in Portland. The film received positive reviews from several media outlets including The Mercury News, Film Threat and others.

Apart from directing and producing several feature films, Garcia has also produced Emmy nominated work for Oregon Art Beat (Oregon Public Broadcasting). He has also directed a national award winning video for Paste Magazine in 2016.

== Works ==
=== Filmography ===
- Tandem Hearts (2010)
- The Falls (2011)
- The Hours Till Daylight (2012)
- The Falls: Testament of Love (2013)
- The Falls: Covenant of Grace (2016)
- Sex Weather (2018)
- Room To Grow (2019)
- Strictly for the Birds (2020)
- Luz (2020)
- Love in Dangerous Times (2020)

=== Discography ===
- Jon Garcia (2006)
- The Lake (2008)
