= Luz (2020 film) =

2020 American LGBT romantic drama film

- Film poster
- Directed by: Jon Garcia
- Written by: Jon Garcia
- Produced by: Jon Garcia; Michael Repsch; Lacy Todd; Rodney Washington
- Starring: Ernesto Reyes; Jesse Tayeh; Jimmy Garcia; Alma Gloria Garcia; Lowell Deo
- Cinematography: Sarah Whelden
- Edited by: Matthew Gift
- Music by: Jim Brunberg; Benjamin Landsverk; Liz Vice; Edna Vazquez; Chispa y Los Complices; Skip vonKuske; Jon Garcia
- Production company: Lake Productions
- Distributed by: Dark Star Pictures
- Release date: August 24, 2020
- Running time: 118 minutes
- Country: United States
- Language: English

Luz – (/luːz/) (pronounced LOOZ) is a 2020 American LGBT romantic drama film written and directed by Jon Garcia, who also served as a producer. It stars Ernesto Reyes, Jesse Tayeh, Jimmy Garcia, Alma Gloria Garcia, and Lowell Deo. The film had its premiere at Miami's OUTshine LGBTQ+ Film Festival on August 24, 2020. It was then screened at Reeling: The Chicago LGBTQ+ International Film Festival, Out on Film, FilmOut San Diego, and Seattle Queer Film Festival. The movie had a limited theatrical release on March 19, 2021 and was then released to DVD and streaming services on April 6, 2021.

== Synopsis ==
Ruben has a job driving for his Mafiosa cousin. When he gets into a car accident while driving one of his cousin's "girls", killing her, he is sentenced to prison. Carlos is his cellmate in prison, and becomes his mentor and eventually his lover, and they end up developing real feelings for one another. Carlos is released from prison before Ruben and goes back to his life running an auto repair shop, and living with his mother and his girlfriend. A couple years later, Ruben is released and tracks him down. Carlos' girlfriend sees what is beginning to happen between the two men and leaves. Now Ruben and Carlos are left to figure out if what they had in prison was real, or just two people having a hook up in prison. In the end, they re-connect and determine what they had was genuine feelings for one another and now want to be together moving forward.

== Cast ==
- Ernesto Reyes as Ruben
- Jesse Tayeh as Carlos
- Jimmy Garcia as Sal
- Alma Gloria Garcia as Benilda
- Lowell Deo as Officer Dowden
- Rega Lupo as Julio
- Marian Mendez as Valerie
- Evie Riojas as Adriana

== Production notes ==
In an interview with Latino Review Media, Garcia revealed that initially the project was going to be a series with 30 minutes episodes, but when an opportunity came along to make it a feature film, he converted the script, combining the episodes to tell the story in a movie. Garcia said the inspiration for the production came from watching the 2016 film Moonlight. He also disclosed that Carlos' mother in the film was played by his own mother, Alma Gloria Garcia. The film was shot on location in Oregon.

== Critical reception ==
Josiah Teal wrote in his review for Film Threat that the film "tells a compelling story from start to finish...the love story is engaging and the prison framework adds tension to an already tense situation". He praised Reyes and Tayeh for giving "exceptional performances" and rated the movie 7/10. Roger Moore from Movie Nation was disappointed in the film, saying "if it was the least bit realistic and had even the tiniest hint of urgency about it, it could have amounted to something." Gary Kramer of Gay City News wasn't particularly impressed either, stating the film "is an amateur but watchable low-budget romance...Garcia shoehorns a few too many elements into his feature...but a slightly explicit sex scene will hold viewers' attention".

The New York Times said Garcia "treats the physicality of their romance in a frank way...but Garcia is less adept at finding passion in between scenes of sex". They went on to say that even though there is some earnestness to their relationship, it eventually becomes emotional draining and "the romance feels monotonous". Australia's Queer Screen said both Reyes and Tayeh are "incredibly attractive and both bring a gravity to the roles and the overall relationship...and the film is an appealing romantic escape from reality". The Geekiary said Garcia "knows how to handle human emotion when handling queer characters and their issues with sexuality...the acting is good across the board, with both actors impressively delivering during emotionally vulnerable scenes". Queer Guru liked the film and Garcia's directing, saying his "plots are never easy to predict and once again he ensures we are sitting on the edge of our seats to the very last frame...it is a beautiful emotional story...and Garcia always shows an exceptional psyche into queer relationships and with such authenticity for someone who is actually an ally of our community".

== See also ==
- List of LGBT-related films of 2020
