= List of LGBTQ-related films of 2020 =

This is a list of lesbian, gay, bisexual, transgender or queer-related films released in 2020. It contains theatrically released films that deal with important gay, lesbian, bisexual, transgender or queer characters or issues and may have same-sex romance or relationships as a plot device.

== Films ==
Title	Director	Country	Genre	Cast	Notes	Ref
Ahead of the Curve	Jen Rainin, Rivka Beth Medow	United States	Documentary			
Always Amber	Lia Hietala, Hannah Reinikainen	Sweden	Documentary			
Ammonite	Francis Lee	United Kingdom; Australia	Drama	Kate Winslet, Saoirse Ronan, Gemma Jones, James McArdle, Alec Secăreanu, Fiona Shaw		
Are We Lost Forever	David Färdmar	Sweden	Drama	Björn Elgerd, Jonathan Andersson, Micki Stoltt, Nemanja Stojanovic		
Automotive	Jonas Heldt	Germany	Documentary			
Babydyke (Babylebbe)	Tone Ottilie	Denmark	Short drama			
Ben Platt: Live from Radio City Music Hall	Alex Timbers; Sam Wrench	United States	Concert film	Ben Platt, Crystal Monee Hall, Kojo Littles, Allen René Louis	Live recording of Ben Platt's September 29, 2019 concert at Radio City Music Hall, as part of his Sing to Me Instead Tour	
Berlin Alexanderplatz	Burhan Qurbani	Germany	Drama	Welket Bunguê, Jella Haase	Adaptation of the 1929 novel by Alfred Döblin	
Bloodthirsty	Amelia Moses	Canada	Horror	Lauren Beatty, Greg Bryk, Katharine King So		
Bloody Nose, Empty Pockets	Bill Ross	United States	Documentary			
The Boys in the Band	Joe Mantello	United States	Drama	Jim Parsons, Zachary Quinto, Matt Bomer, Andrew Rannells, Charlie Carver, Robin de Jesús, Brian Hutchison, Michael Benjamin Washington, Tuc Watkins	Screenplay by Mart Crowley, based on his stage play of the same name	
Breaking Fast	Mike Mosallam	United States	Romantic comedy	Haaz Sleiman, Michael Cassidy, Veronica Cartwright		
Charlatan	Agnieszka Holland	Czech Republic	Drama	Ivan Trojan	Based on the life of healer Jan Mikolášek	
The Christmas Setup	Pat Mills	Canada; United States	Romantic comedy, Christmas	Ben Lewis, Blake Lee, Fran Drescher		
Cicada	Matthew Fifer	United States	Drama	Matthew Fifer, Sheldon D. Brown, Scott Adsit, Cobie Smulders		
Cowboys	Anna Kerrigan	United States	Drama	Steve Zahn, Jillian Bell, Sasha Knight, Ann Dowd		
Cured	Bennett Singer, Patrick Sammon	United States	Documentary			
Dance of the 41 (El baile de los 41)	David Pablos	Mexico	Drama	Alfonso Herrera, Mabel Cadena, Emiliano Zurita, Fernando Becerril, Paulina Álvarez Muñoz		
Dating Amber	David Freyne	Ireland	Drama	Fionn O'Shea, Lola Petticrew		
Days	Tsai Ming-liang	Taiwan	Drama	Lee Kang-sheng		
Dear Leo	Emma Rappold	United States	Drama			
Disclosure: Trans Lives on Screen	Sam Feder	United States	Documentary			
Divinely Evil (Vil, má)	Gustavo Vinagre	Brazil	Documentary			
Dry Wind (Vento Seco)	Daniel Nolasco	Brazil	Drama			
Dustin	Naïla Guiguet	France	Short drama	Dustin Muchwitz, Félix Maritaud		
Ellie & Abbie (& Ellie's Dead Aunt)	Monica Zanetti	Australia	Romantic comedy	Sophie Hawkshaw, Zoe Terakes, Julia Billington		
êmîcêtôcêt: Many Bloodlines	Theola Ross	Canada	Documentary			
Falling	Viggo Mortensen	United States; Canada; United Kingdom	Drama	Viggo Mortensen, Lance Henriksen, Laura Linney, Terry Chen, Sverrir Gudnason, Hannah Gross	Mortensen's directorial debut	
Flowers of the Field	Andrew Stanley	Canada	Drama	Alex Crowther, Ryan Hollyman, Kristopher Turner, Sharon McFarlane, Jesse LaVercombe		
Friend of the World	Brian Patrick Butler	United States	Sci-fi horror	Nick Young, Alexandra Slade, Michael C. Burgess, Kathryn Schott, Kevin Smith, Luke Pensabene, Neil Raymond Ricco	Two-character stage play-like drama with a gay protagonist	
Funny Boy	Deepa Mehta	Canada	Drama	Arush Nand, Brandon Ingram, Ali Kazmi, Agam Darshi, Seema Biswas	Adaptation of the 1994 novel by Shyam Selvadurai	
Girls Shouldn't Walk Alone at Night (Les filles ne marchent pas seules la nuit)	Katerine Martineau	Canada	Short drama	Amaryllis Tremblay, Nahéma Ricci		
Good Joe Bell	Reinaldo Marcus Green	United States	Drama	Mark Wahlberg, Reid Miller, Connie Britton	Based on the suicide of Jadin Bell	
Gossamer Folds	Lisa Donato	United States	Drama	Alexandra Grey		
Happiest Season	Clea DuVall	United States	Romantic comedy	Kristen Stewart, Mackenzie Davis, Alison Brie, Aubrey Plaza, Dan Levy, Mary Holland, Victor Garber, Mary Steenburgen		
The House of Love (La Casa Dell'Amore)	Luca Ferri	Italy	Documentary			
I Am Samuel	Peter Murimi	Kenya	Documentary			
If It Were Love (Si c'était de l'amour)	Patric Chiha	France	Documentary			
Jesse Jams	Trevor Anderson	Canada	Documentary	Jesse Jams		
Jump, Darling	Philip J. Connell	Canada	Comedy-drama	Thomas Duplessie, Cloris Leachman, Tynomi Banks		
Kajillionaire	Miranda July	United States	Comedy-drama	Evan Rachel Wood, Gina Rodriguez, Debra Winger, Richard Jenkins		
Kokon	Leonie Krippendorff	Germany	Drama			
The Last City (Die Letzte Stadt)	Heinz Emigholz	Germany	Drama			
Little Girl (Petite fille)	Sébastien Lifshitz	France	Documentary			
Luz	Jon Garcia	United States	Drama	Ernesto Reyes, Jesse Tayeh		
Milkwater	Morgan Ingari	United States	Comedy-drama	Molly Bernard		
Minyan	Eric Steel	United States	Drama			
My Best Part (Garçon chiffon)	Nicolas Maury	France	Comedy-drama	Nicolas Maury, Nathalie Baye, Arnaud Valois		
My Little Sister (Schwesterlein)	Véronique Reymond	Switzerland	Drama	Nina Hoss, Lars Eidinger		
My Name Is Baghdad (Meu nome é Bagda)	Caru Alves de Souza	Brazil	Drama			
My Tender Matador (Tengo miedo, torero)	Rodrigo Sepúlveda	Chile	Drama	Alfredo Castro, Leonardo Ortizgris, Amparo Noguera	based on the book	
The New Mutants	Josh Boone	United States	Superhero / Horror	Maisie Williams, Anya Taylor-Joy, Charlie Heaton, Alice Braga, Blu Hunt, Henry Zaga		
No Hard Feelings (Futur Drei)	Faraz Shariat	Germany	Drama	Benjamin Radjaipour, Eidin Jalali		
No Ordinary Man	Aisling Chin-Yee, Chase Joynt	Canada	Documentary		Documentary film about Billy Tipton	
One in a Thousand (Las mil y una)	Clarisa Navas	Argentina	Drama			
Out	Steven Hunter	United States	Animated short			
Panthers (Panteres)	Erica Sánchez	Spain	Short drama			
Passage	Sarah Baril Gaudet	Canada	Documentary	Gabrielle Goupil, Yoan Duchesne		
Playdurizm	Gem Deger	Czechia	sci-fi, fantasy, horror, romance, drama, comede	Austin Chunn, Gem Deger, Issy Stewart		
The Prom	Ryan Murphy	United States	Musical comedy	Meryl Streep, James Corden, Andrew Rannells, Nicole Kidman, Keegan-Michael Key, Ariana DeBose, Tracey Ullman, Kevin Chamberlin, Mary Kay Place, Kerry Washington, Jo Ellen Pellman	Based on the stage musical of the same name	
P.S. Burn This Letter Please	Michael Seligman, Jennifer Tiexiera	United States	Documentary		Correspondence among the 1950s New York City drag community	
Queen of the Andes	Jillian Acreman	Canada	Drama	Bhreagh MacNeil, Hailey Chown		
Rūrangi	Max Currie	New Zealand	Drama	Elz Carrad		
Saint-Narcisse	Bruce LaBruce	Canada	Drama	Félix-Antoine Duval, Tania Kontoyanni, Alexandra Petrachuck, Andreas Apergis		
A Secret Love	Chris Bolan	United States	Documentary	Terry Donahue, Pat Henschel, Diana Bolan		
Sheer Qorma	Faraz Arif Ansari	India	Drama	Shabana Azmi, Divya Dutta, Swara Bhaskar		
Shiva Baby	Emma Seligman	United States	Comedy	Rachel Sennott, Molly Gordon, Polly Draper, Fred Melamed, Dianna Agron	Based on Seligman's short film of the same name; the short film was not LGBT-related.	
Shubh Mangal Zyada Saavdhan	Hitesh Kewalya	India	Romantic comedy	Ayushmann Khurrana, Jitendra Kumar, Neena Gupta, Gajraj Rao	spin-off of the 2017 film Shubh Mangal Saavdhan	
Sometimes I Wish I Was on a Desert Island (Y’a des fois où j’aimerais me trouver sur une île déserte)	Eli Jean Tahchi	Canada	Short documentary			
Stage Mother	Thom Fitzgerald	Canada	Comedy	Jacki Weaver, Lucy Liu, Adrian Grenier		
Summer of 85 (Été 85)	François Ozon	France	Drama	Félix Lefebvre, Benjamin Voisin, Philippine Velge, Valeria Bruni Tedeschi, Melvil Poupaud, Isabelle Nanty	Adaptation of the 1982 novel Dance on My Grave by Aidan Chambers	
Summer of Mesa	Josh Cox	United States	Romance	Molly Miles, Andrea Granera		
The Surrogate	Jeremy Hersh	United States	Drama	Jasmine Batchelor, Chris Perfetti, Sullivan Jones		
The Thing About Harry	Peter Paige	United States	Romantic comedy	Jake Borelli, Niko Terho, Karamo Brown, Britt Baron		
Tove	Zaida Bergroth	Finland; Sweden	Drama	Alma Pöysti, Krista Kosonen, Shanti Roney, Joanna Haartti	Based on the life of Finnish author Tove Jansson	
Transhood	Sharon Liese	United States	Documentary			
Uncle Frank	Alan Ball	United States	Drama	Paul Bettany, Sophia Lillis, Peter Macdissi, Judy Greer, Steve Zahn, Lois Smith, Margo Martindale, Stephen Root, Colton Ryan		
Welcome to Chechnya	David France	United States	Documentary			
Wildland (Kød & Blod)	Jeanette Nordahl	Denmark	Drama			
Your Name Engraved Herein	Patrick Kuang-Hui Liu	Taiwan	Drama	Edward Chen, Jing-Hua Tseng, Leon Dai		
