= Daniel Quinn (actor) =

American actor (1956–2015)

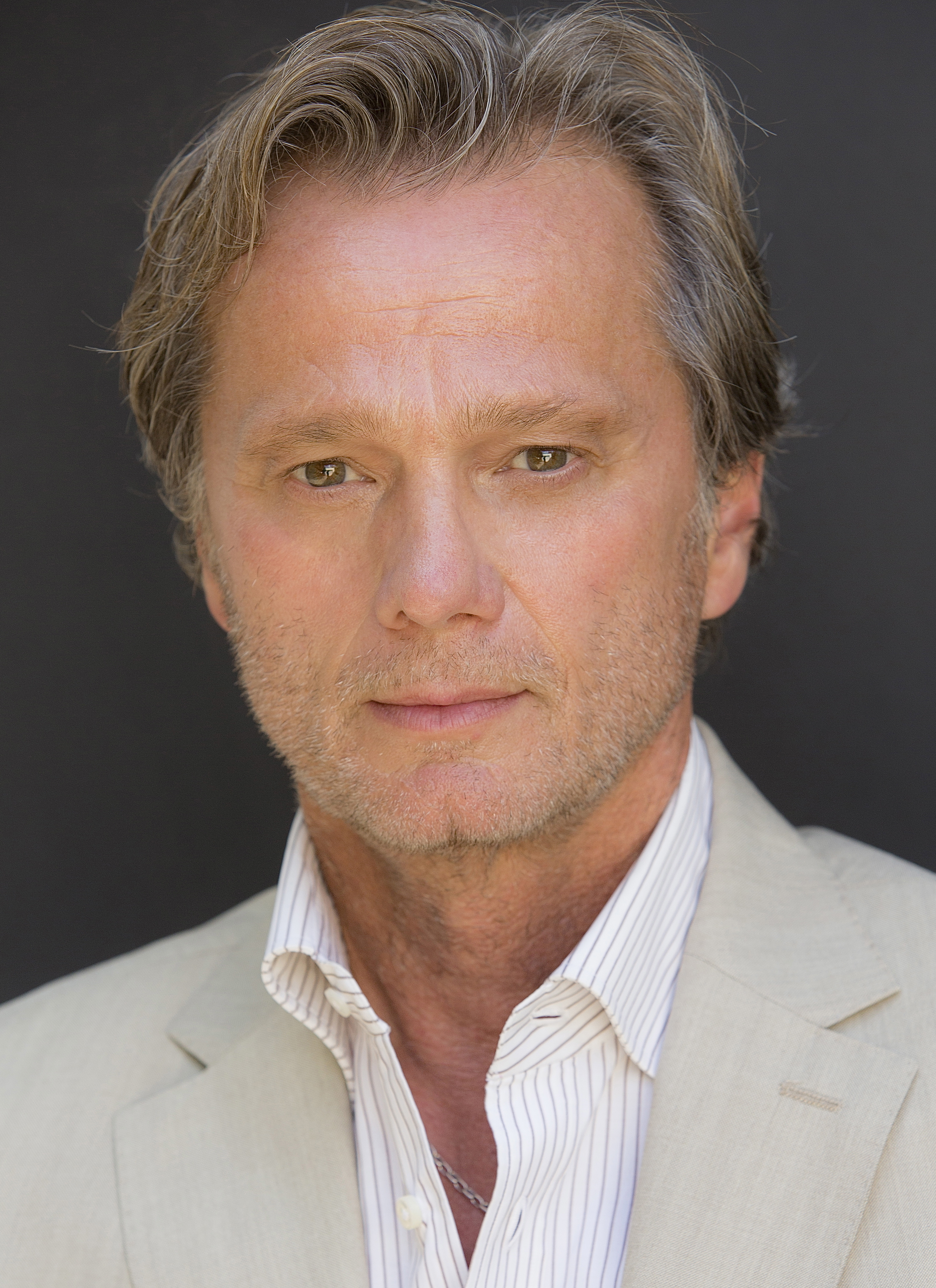
- Born: August 19, 1956; Milwaukee, Wisconsin, U.S.
- Died: July 4, 2015 (aged 58)
- Occupation: Actor
- Years active: 1987–2015

Daniel Quinn (August 19, 1956 – July 4, 2015) was an American actor from Milwaukee, Wisconsin.

== Career ==
Quinn moved to New York City at age 19, where he worked in theater and ballet before breaking into television and film. On television, he has appeared in the soap opera The Young and the Restless, police series Hunter, and independent drama twentysixmiles. He starred in the science fiction films Scanner Cop and Scanners: The Showdown.

== Death ==
Daniel died of a heart attack on July 4, 2015, at the age of 58.

== Filmography ==
=== Film ===
Year	Title	Role	Notes
1989	Dead Bang	James 'Hard Rock' Ellis	
1989	City Rhythms	Francis Picasso	
1990	Impulse	Ted Gates	
1990	Wild at Heart	Young Cowboy	
1991	Whore	Brutal Man	
1991	Motorama	Billy	
1993	Extreme Justice	Bobby Lewis	
1994	Scanner Cop	Samuel Staziak	
1995	Scanners: The Showdown	Samuel Staziak	
1997	Angry Dogs	Jason Reed	
1998	Back to Even	Russell	
2000	Slice & Dice	Mike	
2000	Little Pieces	Brad	
2001	Spiders II: Breeding Ground	Captain Bigelow	
2005	Heads N Tailz	Rabbit	
2005	Miracle at Sage Creek	Seth Keller	
2006	Raising Flagg	Travis Purdy	
2010	Rubber	Dad	
2012	The Sessions	E.R. Doctor	
2012	Karaoke Man	Ritter	
2013	Wrong Cops	Neighbor	
2015	Story of Eva	Dr. Cornelius	
2015	Flirting with Madness	Mr. Brixton	
2016	Psychophonia	Detective Alex Becker	
2016	Codex	Henry	
2017	Get the Girl	Officer Talley	
2017	Cabaret of the Dead	Footman	

=== Television ===
Year	Title	Role	Notes
1988	Crossbow	Terence the Novice	Episode: "Seekers of the Soul"
1989	Hunter	Billy Joe Powell	3 episodes
1989	Matlock	Art Spring	2 episodes
1989–1999	Baywatch	Various roles	5 episodes
1990	So Proudly We Hail	Dwayne	Television film
1990	China Beach	Medic	Episode: "F.N.G."
1991	The Chase	Julian	Television film
1991	Conagher	Johnny McGivern	Television film
1992	Dark Justice	Billy Stafford	Episode: "Instant Replay"
1993	Moon Over Miami	Eddie Grace	Episode: "A Missing Person"
1993	The Last Outlaw	Loomis	Television film
1994	Renegade	Gabe Wilson	Episode: "Sheriff Reno"
1995	The Avenging Angel	Alpheus Young	Television film
1995	Vanishing Son	Terry Hessling	Episode: "Single Flame"
1995	Marker	Jimmy	Episode: "The Pink Unicorn"
1995	American Cop	Franco	Television film
1995, 2004	NYPD Blue	Carter Dubinsky / Gallagher	2 episodes
1996	The X-Files	Lieutenant Jack Schaefer	Episode: "Jose Chung's From Outer Space"
1997	Pacific Blue	Sonny McCue	Episode: "Bad Company"
1997	ER	Casey	Episode: "Friendly Fire"
1999	L.A. Heat	Benjamin Baker	Episode: "Widow Maker"
2001	Diagnosis: Murder	Martin Peterson	Episode: "The Red's Shoes"
2001	Living in Fear	Art Sinnar	Television film
2001	Crossing Jordan	Steven Browning	Episode: "Sight Unseen"
2002	Project Viper	Alan Stanton	Television film
2002	The Young and the Restless	Ralph Hunnicutt	33 episodes
2003	She Spies	Daniel Kovak	Episode: "Rane of Terror"
2004	Without a Trace	Lance Carlson	Episode: "Bait"
2005	Monk	Raymond Novak	Episode: "Mr. Monk and the Kid"
2007	Criminal Minds	Bob Kelton	Episode: "Lucky"
2010	Twentysixmiles	Dirk Stillwell	5 episodes
