= Get the Girl (film) =

- Directed by: Eric England
- Written by: Eric England
- Story by: Eric England; Graham Denman
- Produced by: Eric England; Eric B. Fleischman; Sean Tabibian
- Starring: Noah Segan; Adi Shankar; Daniel Quinn; Scout Taylor-Compton
- Cinematography: Mike Testin
- Edited by: Michael Felker
- Music by: Kevin Riepl
- Production company: Diablo Entertainment
- Distributed by: Vertical Entertainment; Orion Pictures
- Release date: January 27, 2017
- Running time: 87 minutes
- Country: United States
- Language: English

Get the Girl is a 2017 American comedy crime thriller film directed by Eric England.

== Plot ==
Clarence is an awkward young man in love with a bartender named Alex. Despite frequenting the bar multiple times and enduring an awkward encounter, Alex doesn’t seem to notice him, partly because she is preoccupied with her ongoing divorce proceedings. To get her attention, Clarence enlists the help of Patrick, a patron at another bar known for his ability to charm any woman he wants. After Patrick defeats Clarence in an expensive game of pool, he becomes interested in helping when Clarence offers him even more money.

Clarence appears to be very wealthy—he drives a fancy car and mentions that his last name is Duffield, suggesting he comes from a prominent and affluent family. Patrick agrees to help Clarence win Alex over with a drastic plan: for $25,000, Patrick and his associates will kidnap Alex, allowing Clarence to stage a heroic rescue. The idea is that the experience will make Alex fall in love with Clarence.

After leaving the bar one night and walking through the parking garage, Alex gets a text from her husband saying he will agree to sign the divorce papers. After realizing the papers are not in her bag, Clarence nearly runs over her while backing out of his parking space. Just then, a black van pulls up. A group of people in masks, one of them Patrick, abducts Clarence and Alex.

The kidnappers go to Clarence’s residence, a large mansion. An alarm is set off when the kidnappers enter, but Clarence disarms it. Jade, Patrick’s girlfriend, and another kidnapper take Alex upstairs. While alone briefly, Clarence asks Patrick why he’s using a device to disguise his voice. Patrick says it’s for anonymity.

While Jade and another kidnapper are distracted, Alex runs and tries to escape. While trying to recapture her, one of the kidnappers is killed by Alex with a pair of scissors. After Alex is recaptured, Clarence and Patrick renegotiate, and Patrick raises his price to $75,000. Alex escapes from her room a second time and tries to climb down one of balconies of the mansion. She is startled by one of the kidnappers, falls to the ground, and is knocked out.

While the kidnapper takes Alex back inside the house, a police officer shows up at the mansion; the security company called about the alarm, but no one answered. Clarence, Patrick, Jade, and KJ try to play it cool with the police officer. At the same time, the kidnapper watching Alex (who has woken up) accidentally reveals his real name, Carl, to her. An argument ensues and Carl yells and becomes violent. Alex screams. The officer hears the commotion, but Patrick quickly pulls his gun on the officer. Clarence runs back inside and finds Carl smothering Alex. Outside, Patrick shoots and kills the officer. Inside the house, Clarence shoots and kills Carl. Alex is relieved that Clarence has saved her life, but Patrick comes in, beats up Clarence, and drags him downstairs. They argue, and Patrick shoots Clarence in the arm and raises his price to $100,000.

Patrick orders KJ, one of the kidnappers, to start cleaning up the around the house and move the bodies to the van. In order to calm Jade, who is disturbed by all the violence, Patrick gives her an engagement ring. Jade’s fear turns to happiness. KJ finds an AR-15 rifle in the trunk of the police car.

Tired and frustrated, Patrick demands the money. Clarence takes Patrick back behind the mansion where he shows him a locked briefcase at the bottom of the pool. When Clarence admits the briefcase has been there all night, Patrick realizes that there is only $25,000 in it. He pushes Clarence into the pool to retrieve the briefcase. At the same time, KJ goes to the kitchen to look for cleaning products, but finds all the drawers and cabinets empty. He goes to the garage and finds a Toyota car, and inside, a rental ad for the mansion and an insurance document listing Clarence’s last name as “Clark,” not “Duffield.”

Upstairs, Alex recognizes Jade’s engagement ring. Outside, Clarence gets the briefcase but pulls Patrick into the pool as he is getting out and runs around towards the front of the house. KJ comes out to the back yard and informs Patrick that Clarence isn’t who he says he is. Patrick instructs KJ to go to the front of the house to find Clarence.

Patrick goes back inside the house with the briefcase, without his mask on, and is confronted by Jade and Alex. Patrick is Alex’s husband; Alex realized that he was one of the kidnappers when she saw Jade’s ring, which is actually Alex’s wedding ring. KJ radios Patrick that the tires on their van have been slashed (Clarence slashed them). Patrick shoots and kills Jade, and Alex runs into the backyard. KJ tries to shoot her but misses. He goes back inside as Clarence, off screen, calls the police and cuts the power to the house. Patrick and Alex fight at the front of the house and Alex is shot in the leg. She runs back inside the house. KJ and Clarence find each other in the kitchen and struggle, but Clarence gets away, taking a knife with him. Clarence and Alex then find each other and kiss passionately. After he and Alex hide briefly, Clarence pushes KJ down a flight of stairs. KJ accidentally shoots and kills himself with the AR-15.

Now downstairs, Clarence takes the AR-15 from KJ, and Alex takes KJ’s handgun. Patrick finds them and a brief gunfight ensues. The AR-15 finally runs out of bullets, and the three of them are in a standoff: Patrick, holding a gun and the briefcase, Alex, holding a gun, and Clarence, holding only a knife. Patrick has realized not only that Clarence lied about who he is, but that he actually knew who Patrick was the entire time. Clarence reveals that he saw Patrick and Alex when they were happily married and saw their marriage crumble. He also figured out why Patrick would not divorce Alex – he wanted the money Alex inherited from her grandmother. Clarence knew that Patrick would jump at an opportunity to kill Alex and get her inheritance. Just as Patrick is about to shoot Alex, Alex shoots him. Patrick drops his gun. Clarence tells him to open the briefcase. Inside is not money, but Alex’s divorce papers. Clarence gives Patrick two choices: sign the divorce papers, or Alex will decide what happens to him. Patrick signs them.

Patrick walks out the front door as police start to arrive. Alex is both stunned and puzzled, as Clarence doesn’t really even know her, but Clarence tells her that he loves her. He explains that after her marriage went bad, he saw her guarding herself from ever being loved again. “So you almost killed me to show me that I’m alive?” she asks. Clarence responds, somewhat embarrassed “Yeah, something like that.” With the police outside Clarence gives Alex two options: shoot him, since he deserves it for everything that he put her through, or, let the police arrest him. But he tells her to promise him that she is going to live her life knowing that she deserves to be happy. Alex replies neither of those options are positive for him, but Clarence doesn’t feel he deserves a positive option. Alex then asks what option three would be; to her there must be an option three. Clarence replies “Well, if there’s an option three, I guess it’d have to be…” as the screen goes to black.

== Cast ==
- Justin Dobies as Clarence
- Elizabeth Whitson as Alex
- Noah Segan as Patrick
- Adi Shankar as KJ
- Daniel Quinn as Officer Talley
- Scout Taylor-Compton as Jade
- James Landry Hébert as Carl
- Jerry Purpdrank as Embry

== Reception ==
On the review aggregator website Rotten Tomatoes, 13% of 8 critics' reviews are positive, with an average rating of 5.8/10. Brian Tallerico of RogerEbert.com gave the film two stars.
