= Roadside (film) =

- Film poster
- Directed by: Eric England
- Written by: Eric England
- Produced by: Daniel F. Dunn; Eric England; Ace Marrero
- Starring: Eric England
- Cinematography: Dan Hertzog
- Edited by: Levi Blue
- Music by: Igor Nemirovsky
- Distributed by: Image Entertainment
- Release date: March 2, 2013 (CineMayhem Film Festival)
- Running time: 90 minutes
- Country: United States
- Language: English

Roadside is a 2013 American horror film written and directed by Eric England.

A husband and his pregnant wife fight for their lives when they are held hostage in their car by a concealed gunman at the side of a desolate road.

== Cast ==
- Ace Marrero as Dan Summers
- Katie Stegeman as Mindy Summers
- Jack E. Curenton as Attendant
- Lionel D. Carson as Park Ranger
- Marshall Yates as Man in the Truck
- Alan Pietruszewski as Jeff
- Brad Douglas as The Gunman (voice)
- Tupelo Honey of Angel as Buddy the Dog
- Alexis Raven Marrero as Davina
- Lawrence Jett as Kid at the Dinner Table
- Joseph Jett as the Kid at the Dinner Table
- Erin Stegeman as 911 Operator
- Eric England as Park Ranger #2
