= Body horror =

Subgenre of horror fiction

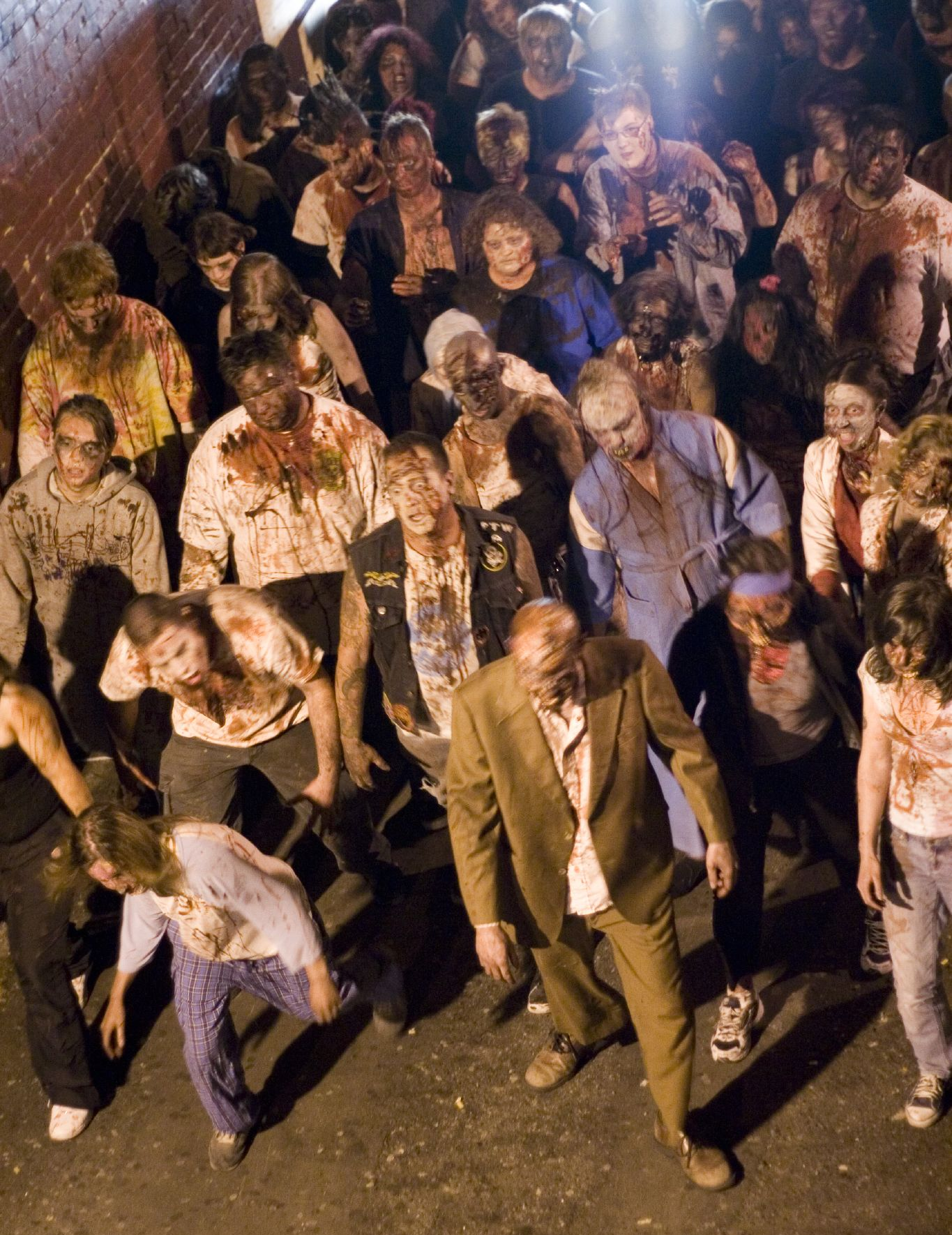
Group of zombies, during the shooting of the film Meat Market 3

Body horror, or biological horror, is a subgenre of horror fiction that intentionally showcases the grotesque or the visceral depiction of the human body or of another creature. These violations may manifest through aberrant sex, mutations, mutilation, zombification, gratuitous violence, disease, or unnatural movements of the body. Body horror was a description originally applied to an emerging subgenre of North American horror films, but has roots in early Gothic literature and has expanded to include other media.

== Characteristics ==
Body horror specifically focuses on the limits and transformative capabilities of the human body.

Body horror often overlaps with, but is distinct from, other horror subgenres. For example, while elements of mutilation may be present in body horror, other similar subgenres such as slasher, splatter, or monster horror may also share this trope, but differ in message and intent. A common difference in the body horror genre is that violations or distortions of the body are rarely the result of immediate or initial violence. Instead, they are generally marked by a loss of conscious control over the body through mutation, disease, or other tropes involving uncontrolled transformation. The genre can invoke intense feelings of physical and psychological disgust, or squick, and play upon anxieties of physical vulnerability. In addition to common tropes used within the broader horror genre, some tropes specific to the body horror subgenre may include invasion, contagion, mutation, transformation, disease, mutilation, or other unnatural or violent distortions of the human body.

Some body horror films, such as Crimes of the Future and Titane, have been likened to erotic horror.

== History ==
The term "Body-horror" was first used by Phillip Brophy in his 1983 article "Horrality: The Textuality of the Contemporary Horror Film". He coined this term to describe an emerging subgenre which occurred during a short golden period for contemporary horror film. Although Brophy coined the term to specifically describe a trend within cinema, film director Stuart Gordon notes that the body horror trope had existed before its adaptation to the screen, most notably within fictional writing.

=== Literature ===
Mary Shelley's Frankenstein (1818) is an early example of the body horror subgenre within fictional writing. The success of gothic horror in the 19th century, in combination with the birth of science fiction as a literary form, is thought to be the origin of body horror as a literary genre. According to Halberstam, "By focusing on the body as a locus of fear, Shelley's novel suggests that it is people (or at least bodies) who terrify people... the landscape of fear is replaced by sutured skin."

"I Have No Mouth, and I Must Scream" by Harlan Ellison (1967) prominently features elements of body horror. The story explores extreme bodily mutilation, forced transformation, and the stripping of autonomy, emphasizing the grotesque and unnatural manipulation of the human body.

Franz Kafka's The Metamorphosis is another early example of body horror literature. It shows Gregor Samsa transform into a large bug for unknown reasons. The work has influenced other body horrors like The Fly.

=== Film ===
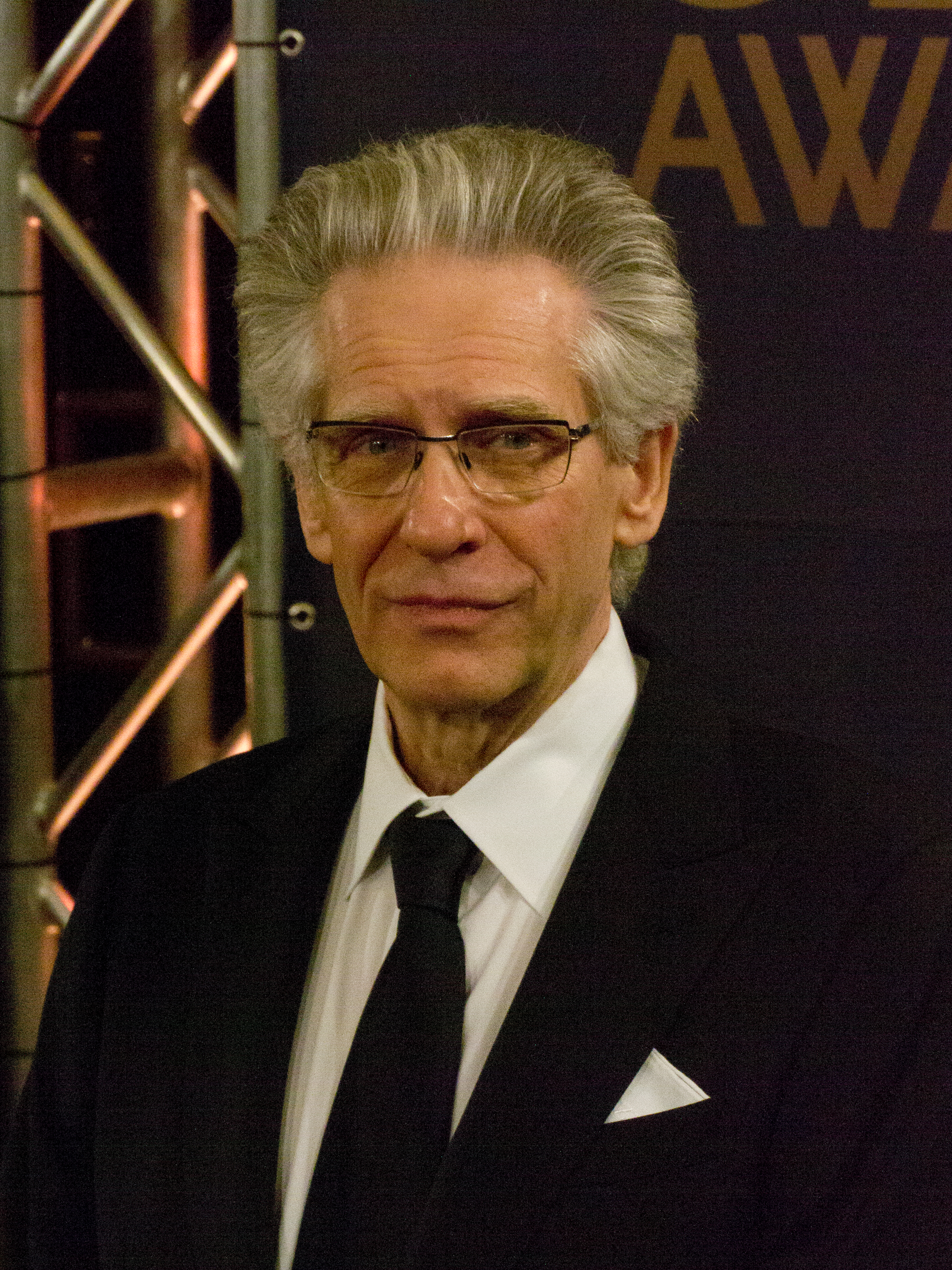
David Cronenberg, the principal originator of the genre

The Quatermass Xperiment (1955) is considered the earliest body horror film. Canadian filmmaker David Cronenberg is considered a principal originator of body horror through early films such as Shivers and Rabid, and his remake of The Fly.

Body horror tropes existed within film prior to wider recognition of the genre. Early examples of the body horror genre arose out of 1950s American horror cinema including The Blob and The Fly, both of which set the standard for the genre due to the films' primary focus on mutation and visceral special effects. Many contemporary films of the horror genre (those produced after 1968), including body horror, are considered to be postmodern in contrast to classical horror. However, postmodernism is concerned with blurring boundaries between categories, making delineations between genres difficult to define.

The body horror genre is widely represented throughout Japanese horror and within contemporary media, such as anime. Katsuhiro Otomo's 1988 film Akira is an early example of body horror within anime. The film uses the genre to explore the "notion of the adolescent body as a site of metamorphosis, a metamorphosis that can appear monstrous both to the figure undergoing it and to the outside world."

In the other films like Shinya Tsukamoto's 1989 film Tetsuo: The Iron Man is also an example of the body horror on the cyberpunk media, this is being an the allegory of the alienation of the Japanese society, where the people "start becoming iron."

Brian Yuzna's 1989 cult-classic film Society features visceral body-melting called "shunting" thanks to the special effects artist Screaming Mad George.

The Substance made history in 2025 when it was nominated in five categories at the 97th Academy Awards, including Best Picture, making it the first body horror film to be nominated in the category.

=== Comics and graphic novels ===
Many manga authors, such as Hideshi Hino, specialize in writing within the horror genre and use body horror tropes in combination with narrative storytelling devices of Japanese horror. Highly influenced by the literary works of H. P. Lovecraft, Junji Ito's manga depict obscene body horror through both aesthetic and narrative in order to invoke feelings of abject terror. In contrast, Canadian cartoonist Michael DeForge incorporates recurring body horror aspects within his work through less graphic aesthetic and narrative styles.

== Controversy and censorship ==
Since the eighteenth century, the horror genre has been popular among readers but dismissed as controversial by some critics who saw the genre and its thematic elements threatening or dangerous to society.

Because of the use of graphic violence or themes that may be considered taboo, horror media that fall within the body horror genre are often censored or banned across a variety of countries.

== See also ==
- Abjection
- Erotic horror
- New Extremity § The body
- Barbara Creed
- Grotesque body
- List of body horror media
- Psychological horror
- Splatterpunk
