= Lucille Lortel Award for Outstanding Lead Actress in a Play =

Annual Off-Broadway theatre award

- Awarded for: Outstanding Lead Actress in a Play
- Location: United States
- Presented by: The Off-Broadway League
- Status: Retired
- Currently held by: Emily Davis for Is This a Room (2020)
- Website: lortelaward.com

The Lucille Lortel Award for Outstanding Lead Actress in a Play was an award presented annually at the Lucille Lortel Awards to honor an actress for excellence in a leading role in an Off-Broadway production. The categories were split into Outstanding Lead Actress in a Play and Outstanding Lead Actress in a Musical in 2014. The acting categories were made gender-neutral in 2021.

Eileen Atkins, Cherry Jones, Mary-Louise Parker and Tonya Pinkins have won the award twice each (with Pinkins' wins including one for a combined musical/play category in 2004. Quincy Tyler Bernstine and Jayne Houdyshell hold the record for most nominations, with four each; Houdyshell has received the most nominations without a win.

Several musical performers won or received nominations in this category before the musical/play categories split, including:

- Tonya Pinkins - 2004 winner for Caroline, Or Change
- Elaine Stritch - 2002 nominee for Elaine Stritch: At Liberty
- Jayne Houdyshell - - 2010 nominee for Coraline
- Sherie Rene Scott - 2010 nominee for Everyday Rapture
- Molly Ranson - 2012 nominee for Carrie
- Mary Testa - 2012 nominee for Queen of the Mist

== Award winners ==
Key

and bold indicates the winner.

=== 1990s ===
Year	Actress	Play	Role	Ref.
1992	**Eileen Atkins**	A Room of One’s Own	Virginia Woolf	
1993	**Anna Deavere Smith**	Fires in the Mirror	All	
1994	**Myra Carter**	Three Tall Women	A	
1995	**Linda Lavin** (Tie)	Death Defying Acts	Dorothy/Carol	
1995	**Eileen Atkins** (Tie)	Vita & Virginia	Virginia Woolf	
1996	**Uta Hagen**	Mrs. Klein	Mrs. Klein	
1997	**Mary-Louise Parker**	How I Learned to Drive	Li'l Bit	
1998	**Cherry Jones**	Pride’s Crossing	Mabel Tidings/Bigelow	
1999	**Kathleen Chalfant**	Wit	Vivian Bearing, Ph.D.	

=== 2000s ===
Year	Actress	Play	Role	Ref.
2000	**Eileen Heckart**	**The Waverly Gallery**	**Gladys Green**	
2001	**Mary-Louise Parker**	**Proof**	**Catherine**	
2001	Eileen Atkins	The Unexpected Man	The Woman	
2001	Janie Dee	Comic Potential	Jacie Triplethree	
2001	Mary Beth Fisher	Boy Gets Girl	Theresa Bedell	
2001	Marian Seldes	The Play About the Baby	Woman	
2002	**Linda Emond**	**Homebody/Kabul**	**The Homebody**	
2002	Ruby Dee	Saint Lucy’s Eyes	N/A	
2002	Martha Plimpton	Hobson’s Choice	Maggie Hobson	
2002	Phylicia Rashad	Blue	Peggy Clark	
2002	Elaine Stritch	Elaine Stritch At Liberty	N/A	
2003	**Tovah Feldshuh**	**Golda's Balcony**	**Golda Meir**	
2003	S. Epatha Merkerson	Fucking A	Hester Smith	
2003	Kate Mulgrew	Tea at Five	Katharine Hepburn	
2003	Pamela Payton-Wright	Fifth of July	Sally Friedman	
2003	Parker Posey	Fifth of July	Gwen Landis	
2004	**Tonya Pinkins**	**Caroline, or Change**	**Caroline Thibodeaux**	
2004	Lisa Emery	Iron	Fay	
2004	Jayne Houdyshell	Well	Ensemble	
2004	Swoosie Kurtz	Frozen	Nancy	
2004	Zilah Mendoza	Living Out	Ana Hernandez	
2005	**Cherry Jones**	**Doubt**	**Sister Aloysius**	
2005	Ashlie Atkinson	Fat Pig	Helen	
2005	Viola Davis	Intimate Apparel	Esther	
2005	Judy Kaye	Souvenir	Florence Foster Jenkins	
2005	Elizabeth Marvel	Hedda Gabler	Hedda Gabler	
2006	**Lois Smith**	**The Trip to Bountiful**	**Carrie Watts**	
2006	Jennifer Jason Leigh	Abigail's Party	Beverly	
2006	S. Epatha Merkerson	Birdie Blue	Birdie	
2006	Julie White	The Little Dog Laughed	Diane	
2006	Dianne Wiest	Third	Laurie Jameson	
2007	**Gloria Reuben**	**Stuff Happens**	**Condoleezza Rice**	
2007	Rebecca Brooksher	Dying City	Kelly	
2007	Jill Clayburgh	The Busy World Is Hushed	Hannah	
2007	Patricia Heaton	The Scene	Stella	
2007	Laila Robins	Sore Throats	Judy	
2008	**Elizabeth Franz**	**The Piano Teacher**	**Mrs. K**	
2008	Lisa Gay Hamilton	Ohio State Murders	Suzanne Alexander	
2008	Jayne Houdyshell	The Receptionist	Beverly Wilkins	
2008	Alison Pill	Blackbird	Una	
2008	Lynn Redgrave	Grace	Grace	
2009	**Saidah Arrika Ekulona**	**Ruined**	**Mama Nadi**	
2009	Ellen Burstyn	The Little Flower of East Orange	Therese Marie	
2009	Carmen M. Herlihy	crooked	Maribel	
2009	Kellie Overbey	The Savannah Disputation	Melissa	
2009	Annie Parisse	Becky Shaw	Becky	

=== 2010s ===
Year	Actress	Play	Role	Ref.
2010	**Judith Ivey**	**The Glass Menagerie**	**Amanda Wingfield**	
2010	Nina Arianda	Venus in Fur	Vanda	
2010	Jayne Houdyshell	Coraline	Coraline	
2010	Cristin Milioti	Stunning	Lily Schwecky	
2010	Sherie Rene Scott	Everyday Rapture	Sherie Rene Scott	
2011	**Laurie Metcalf**	**The Other Place**	**Juliana**	
2011	Tracee Chimo	Bachelorette	Regan	
2011	Edie Falco	This Wide Night	Lorraine	
2011	Elizabeth Marvel	The Little Foxes	Regina Giddens	
2011	Michele Pawk	A Small Fire	Emily Bridges	
2012	**Sanaa Lathan**	**By the Way, Meet Vera Stark**	**Vera Stark**	
2012	Cristin Milioti	Once	Girl	
2012	Carey Mulligan	Through a Glass Darkly	Karin	
2012	Molly Ranson	Carrie	Carrie	
2012	Mary Testa	Queen of the Mist	Annie Edson Taylor	
2013	**Roslyn Ruff**	**The Piano Lesson**	**Berniece**	
2013	Quincy Tyler Bernstine	Neva	Masha	
2013	America Ferrera	Bethany	Crystal	
2013	Vanessa Redgrave	The Revisionist	Maria	
2013	Sharon Washington	Wild With Happy	Adelaide/Aunt Glo	
2014	**Tracee Chimo**	**Bad Jews**	**Daphna**	
2014	Diane Davis	The Model Apartment	Debby	
2014	Carolyn McCormick	The Open House	Mother	
2014	Laurie Metcalf	Domesticated	Judy	
2014	Andrus Nichols	Bedlam's Hamlet and Saint Joan	Actor #2/Gertrude/Ophelia/Joan/Others	
2015	**Tonya Pinkins**	**Rasheeda Speaking**	**Jaclyn**	
2015	Quincy Tyler Bernstine	Grand Concourse	Shelly	
2015	Anna Gunn	Sex With Strangers	Olivia	
2015	Jan Maxwell	The City of Conversation	Hester Ferris	
2015	S. Epatha Merkerson	While I Yet Live	Maxine	
2016	**Phylicia Rashad**	**Head of Passes**	**Shelah**	
2016	Ito Aghayere	Familiar	Nyasha	
2016	Georgia Engel	John	Mertis Katherine Graven	
2016	Jayne Houdyshell	The Humans	Deirdre	
2016	Chinasa Ogbuagu	Sojourners	Abasiama	
2017	**Jennifer Ehle**	**Oslo**	**Mona**	
2017	Johanna Day	Sweat	Tracey	
2017	Jennifer Kidwell	Underground Railroad Game	Teacher Caroline	
2017	Kecia Lewis	Marie and Rosetta	Sister Rosetta Tharpe	
2017	Maryann Plunkett	Women of a Certain Age	Mary	
2018	**Carrie Coon**	**Mary Jane**	**Mary Jane**	
2018	Quincy Tyler Bernstine	The Amateurs	Hollis	
2018	MaameYaa Boafo	School Girls; Or, the African Mean Girls Play	Paulina Sarpong	
2018	Cristin Milioti	After the Blast	Anna	
2018	Karen Pittman	Pipeline	Nya	
2019	**Quincy Tyler Bernstine**	**Marys Seacole**	**Mary**	
2019	Ako	God Said This	Masako	
2019	Marin Ireland	Blue Ridge	Alison	
2019	Zainab Jah	Boesman and Lena	Lena	
2019	Charlayne Woodard	Daddy	Zora	

=== 2020s ===
Year	Actress	Play	Character	Ref.
2020	**Emily Davis**	**Is This a Room**	**Reality Winner**	
2020	Liza Colón-Zayas	Halfway Bitches Go Straight to Heaven	Sarge	
2020	April Matthis	Toni Stone	Toni Stone	
2020	Zoë Winters	Heroes of the Fourth Turning	Teresa	
2020	Kara Young	All the Natalie Portmans	Keyonna	

== Multiple wins ==
2 wins

- Eileen Atkins
- Cherry Jones
- Mary-Louise Parker
- Tonya Pinkins

== Multiple nominations ==
4 nominations

- Jayne Houdyshell
- Quincy Tyler Bernstine

3 nominations

- Eileen Atkins
- S. Epatha Merkerson
- Cristin Milioti

2 nominations

- Mary-Louise Parker
- Cherry Jones
- Phylicia Rashad
- Tonya Pinkins
- Elizabeth Marvel
- Laurie Metcalf
- Tracee Chimo

== See also ==
- Obie Award for Distinguished Performance by an Actress (Off-Broadway and Off-Off-Broadway)
- Drama Desk Award for Outstanding Featured Actress in a Play (Broadway, Off-Broadway and Off-Off-Broadway)
