= Betsy Aidem =

American actress

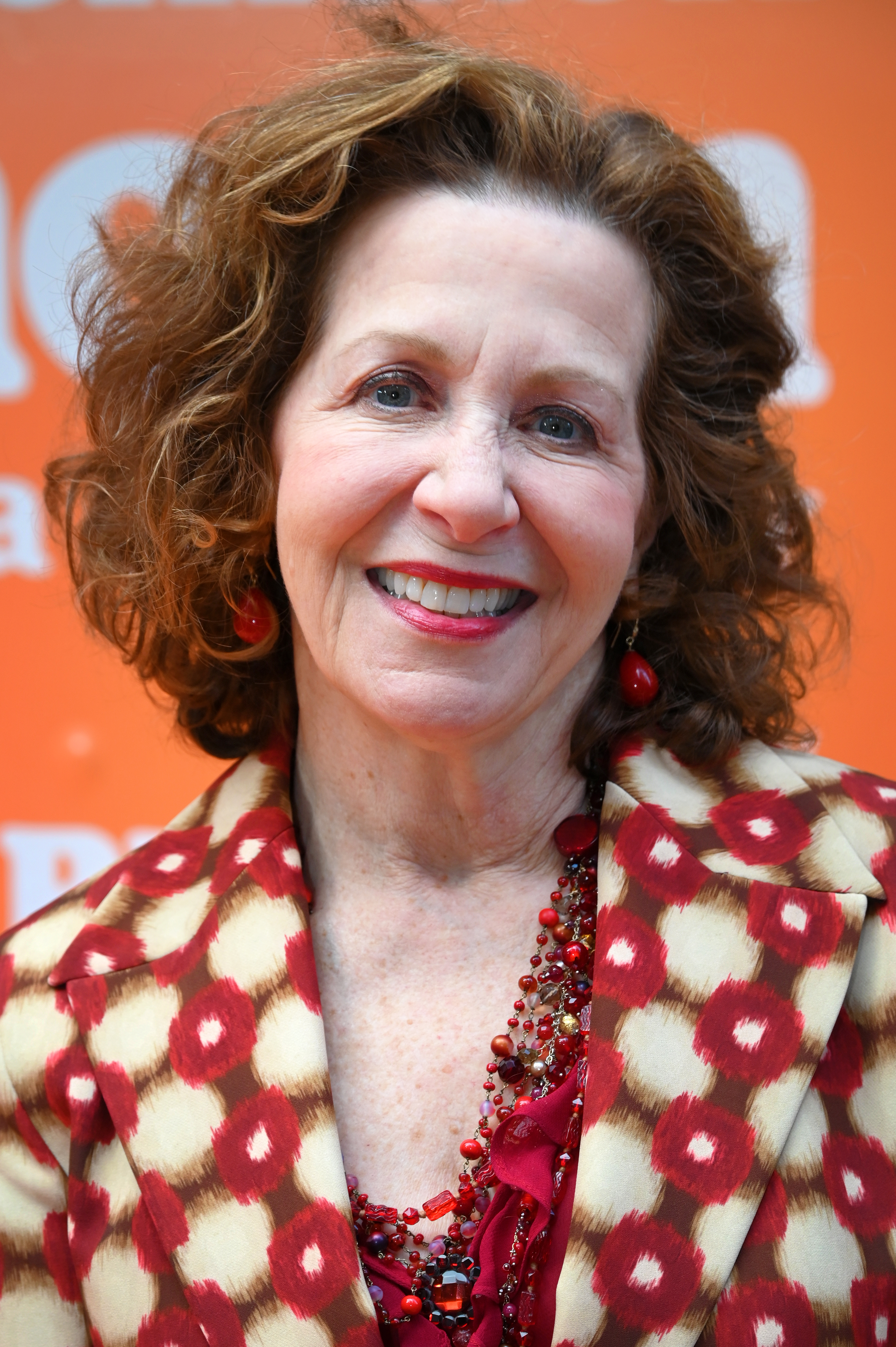
- Aidem in 2026
- Occupations: Actress, director
- Years active: 1982–present
- Spouse: William Fichtner (m. 1987; div. 1996)
- Children: 1

Betsy Aidem is an American actress.

Her film work includes The Bleeding House, See You in the Morning, A Vigilante, and Aeris. Her television work includes The High Life and The Americans, appearing in the latter in the episodes "Safe House" and "Covert War".

Her stage work includes Steel Magnolias and Five Women Wearing the Same Dress. She was nominated for the Tony Award for Best Actress in a Play for her performance in Prayer for the French Republic. In 2007, she was given an Obie Award for "sustained excellence of performance" for her work Off-Broadway.

== Background ==
Aidem first became interested in acting while she was in high school. Her debut was as a fairy in Shakespeare's A Midsummer Night's Dream. She was the first wife of William Fichtner and had a child with him.

== Career ==
=== Stage work ===
Midway through 2009, Aidem was in Nicki Bloom's Tender, a story about an act of violence that destroys a family. The play, directed by Daniela Topol, also starred Kerry Bishé, Michael Cullen, and Matt Dellapina. In October 2018, she appeared as the loony and flamboyant Professor Carroway in Love Course which was about two eccentric neurotics, Carroway and Professor Burgess, teaching a course in romantic literature and two students who attend the course and end up teaching it. She is also a stage play director and her first professional production as director was 2018's A Doll's House, Part 2, a George Street Playhouse production of the Lucas Hnath comedy.

=== Film work ===
Her earliest film work was in the 1982 film A Little Sex, where she played a passer-by. In 1985, she appeared in the television film Kojak: The Belarus File as Elissa Barak.

She appeared in Sarah Daggar-Nickson's 2018 film A Vigilante which starred Olivia Wilde, Morgan Spector and Kyle Catlett. Also that year she was in Aeris, a film about a couple adopting a sick kitten.

=== Television shows ===
Her work on television shows includes recurring roles on The High Life as Irene, and as Dr. Sloane on Law & Order: Special Victims Unit.

== Stage appearances ==
Title	Role	Playwright	Director	Year	Notes #
Balm in Gilead	Kay	Lanford Wilson	John Malkovich	1984	Off-Broadway
Crossing the Bar	Performer	Michael Zettler	Jerry Zaks	1985	Off-Broadway
A Lie of the Mind	Sally	Sam Shepard	Sam Shepard	1985	Off-Broadway
Steel Magnolias	Shelby	Robert Harling	Pamela Berlin	1987	Off-Broadway
Road	Carol	Jim Cartwright	Simon Curtis	1987	Off-Broadway
The Night Hank Williams Died	Nellie Bess Powers Clark	Larry L. King	Christopher Ashley	1989	Off-Broadway
Five Women Wearing the Same Dress	Georgeanne	Alan Ball	Melia Bensussen	1993	Off-Broadway
Teibele and Her Demon	Teibele	Isaac Bashevis Singer	Daniel Gerroll	1994	Off-Broadway
The Butterfly Collection	Performer	Theresa Rebeck	Bartlett Sher	2000	Off-Broadway
Good Thing	Nancy Roy	Jessica Goldberg	Jo Bonney	2001	Off-Broadway
Sea of Tranquility	Phyllis	Howard Korder	Neil Pepe	2004	Off-Broadway
Celebration and The Room	Julie	Harold Pinter	Neil Pepe	2005	Off-Broadway
Mary Rose	Mrs. Moreland	J. M. Barrie	Tina Landau	2007	Off-Broadway
Crooked	Elise	Catherine Trieschmann	Liz Diamond	2008	Off-Broadway
Tender		Nicki Bloom	Daniela Topol	2009	Off-Broadway
The Metal Children	Lynne / Roberta Cupp	Adam Rapp	Adam Rapp	2010	Off-Broadway
Dreams of Flying Dreams of Falling	Performer	Adam Rapp	Neil Pepe	2011	Off-Broadway
Nikolai and the Others	Lisa Sokoloff	Richard Nelson	David Cromer	2013	Off-Broadway
All the Way	Lady Bird Johnson / various	Robert Schenkkan	Bill Rauch	2014	Broadway
Mama's Boy	Marguerite Oswald	Rob Urbinati	Brian P. Allen	2015	Regional
Final Follies	Wilma Trumbo/Professor Carroway	A. R. Gurney	David Saint	2018	Off-Broadway
Prayer for the French Republic	Marcelle Salomon Benhamou	Joshua Harmon	David Cromer	2022	Off-Broadway
Leopoldstadt	Grandma Emilia	Tom Stoppard	Patrick Marber	2022	Original Broadway Production
Prayer for the French Republic	Marcelle Salomon Benhamou	Joshua Harmon	David Cromer	2023	Original Broadway Production
Liberation	Margie	Bess Wohl	Whitney White	2025	Off-Broadway World Premiere
Liberation	Margie	Bess Wohl	Whitney White	2025	Original Broadway production

== Partial filmography ==
Title	Role	Director	Year	Notes
A Little Sex	Passerby	Bruce Paltrow	1982	
Kojak: The Belarus File	Elissa Barak	Robert Markowitz	1985	
See You in the Morning	Larry's Sister-in-Law	Alan J. Pakula	1989	
Fool's Fire	Lady Angela	Julie Taymor	1992	
Nine Months	Gail's Nurse	Chris Columbus	1995	
Music of the Heart	Mrs Lamb	Wes Craven	1999	
You Can Count on Me	Minister	Kenneth Lonergan	2000	
Maze	Lydia	Rob Morrow	2000	
Far from Heaven	Pool Mother	Todd Haynes	2002	
People I Know	Talia Greene	Dan Algrant	2002	
Winter Passing	Nurse	Adam Rapp	2005	
Confess	Julie Bradford	Stefan Schaefer	2005	
The Attic	Ms. Kettering	Mary Lambert	2007	
Motherhood	Jordan's Mom	Katherine Dieckmann	2009	
The Bleeding	Marilyn	Philip Gelatt	2011	
Mr. Popper's Penguins	Tavern Hostess	Mark Waters	2011	
The Oranges	Anne Allen	Julian Farino	2011	
Margaret	Abigail	Kenneth Lonergan	2011	
Arbitrage	Vogler's Secretary	Nicholas Jarecki	2012	
The Greatest Showman	Mrs. Carlyle	Michael Gracey	2017	
A Vigilante	Andrea Shaund	Sarah Daggar-Nickson	2018	
Triumph of the Will	TBA	Gabriel Nussbaum	TBA	

== Awards and nominations ==
Year	Award	Category	Work	Result	Ref.
2022	Lucille Lortel Awards	Outstanding Featured Performer in a Play	Prayer for the French Republic	Nominated	
2022	Outer Critics Circle Award	Outstanding Actress in a Play	Prayer for the French Republic	Nominated	
2024	Drama League Award	Distinguished Performance	Prayer for the French Republic	Nominated	
2024	Tony Award	Best Actress in a Play	Prayer for the French Republic	Nominated	
2025	Drama Desk Award	Outstanding Lead Performance in a Play	The Ask	Nominated	
2025	Drama Desk Award	Outstanding Ensemble	Liberation	Won	
2025	New York Drama Critics' Circle	Best Ensemble	Liberation	Won	
2025	Outer Critics Circle Award	Outstanding Featured Performer in an Off-Broadway Play	Liberation	Nominated	
2025	Tony Awards	Best Featured Actress in a Play	Liberation	Nominated	
