= The Commissioner =

The Commissioner can refer to:

- Commissioner Gordon, a character from Batman, known as The Commissioner
- The Commissioner, or De Lunatico Inquirendo, an 1843 novel by G. P. R. James
- The Commissioner, a 1962 novel by Richard Dougherty, basis for the 1968 film Madigan
- The Commissioner, a 1987 novel by Stanley Johnson
- The Commissioner (film), a 1998 film based on the Johnson novel
