= Tell (2014 film) =

2014 film by J.M.R. Luna

- Film poster
- Directed by: J.M.R. Luna
- Written by: Timothy Williams
- Produced by: Christopher Boyd; Russ Cundiff; J.M.R. Luna; Kevin Mann; Matthew Perniciaro; Milo Ventimiglia
- Starring: Milo Ventimiglia; Katee Sackhoff; Jason Lee; Alan Tudyk; Faizon Love
- Cinematography: Yaron Levy
- Edited by: Michael P. Shawver
- Music by: Steve Davis
- Production companies: Haven Entertainment; American Film Productions; Divide Pictures; Bron Studios
- Distributed by: Orion Pictures
- Release date: December 4, 2014
- Running time: 88 minutes
- Country: United States
- Language: English

Tell is a 2014 crime thriller directed by J.M.R. Luna and starring Katee Sackhoff, Jason Lee and Milo Ventimiglia. Written by actor/screenwriter Timothy Williams, it was produced by Haven Entertainment, distributed by Orion Pictures, and was released on December 4.

== Plot ==
Ethan Tell is a small time crook who makes a big-time score when he steals 1 million dollars from a bank job that had been planned by his brother-in-law. Ironically, his life radically changes for the worse when he discovers that stealing the money was the easy part, as his wife shoots him after the police follow him home. Tell is subsequently arrested and sentenced to three years in prison when he continually claims that the money was destroyed in a fire.

== Cast ==
- Milo Ventimiglia as Tell
- Katee Sackhoff as Beverly
- Jason Lee as Ray
- Robert Patrick as Ashton
- Alan Tudyk as Morton
- John Michael Higgins as Huffman
- Faizon Love as Dwight Johnson
- Oscar Nunez as Father Jack
