= The Rainbow Experiment =

- Directed by: Christina Kallas
- Written by: Christina Kallas
- Produced by: Christina Kallas; Allison Vanore
- Starring: Connor Siemer; Richard Liriano; Patrick Bonck; Nina Mehta; Christine McLaughlin; Stratos Tzortzoglou; Lauren Sowa; Swann Gruen; Christian Coulson
- Cinematography: David Sharples
- Edited by: Natalie Reneau
- Music by: Joseph Conlan
- Production company: Alliecine
- Distributed by: Gravitas Ventures
- Release dates: 20 January 2018 (Slamdance Film Festival); 7 December 2018 (US)
- Running time: 130 minutes
- Country: United States
- Language: English

The Rainbow Experiment is a 2018 American drama film directed by Christina Kallas, starring Connor Siemer, Richard Liriano, Patrick Bonck, Nina Mehta, Christine McLaughlin, Stratos Tzortzoglou, Lauren Sowa, Swann Gruen and Christian Coulson.

== Cast ==
- Connor Siemer as Matty Fairchild
- Richard Liriano as JC Caraballo
- Patrick Bonck as Jess Williamson
- Nina Mehta as Lisa Dhawan
- Christine McLaughlin as Toni McKenna
- Stratos Tzortzoglou as Nicky Kazan
- Lauren Sowa as Allis Wilmore
- Swann Gruen as Ross Fairchild
- Christian Coulson as Adam Kazan
- Chris Beetem as Jamie Freeman
- Kevin Kane as David McKenna
- Francis Benhamou as Anna Guerrero

== Release ==
The film premiered at the Slamdance Film Festival on 20 January 2018. It was released in the United States on 7 December.

== Reception ==
On the review aggregator website Rotten Tomatoes, 56% of 9 critics' reviews are positive.

Shelagh Rowan-Legg of ScreenAnarchy wrote that "By recounting these stories of the private and public politics, the emotional and the professional, Kallas asks her audience to understand and question how easily we think we can know what happened in any terrible accident."

Bill Arceneaux of Film Threat gave the film a score of 3 out of 5 wrote that Kallas is "completely capable of guiding with a strong editorial hand, the improv-heavy cast to its emotionally resonant and truly tense moments."

The Hollywood Reporter called the film "a year's worth of soap opera, condensed to 130 minutes."
