= Five Women Wearing the Same Dress =

Play written by Alan Ball

- Written by: Alan Ball
- Characters: Meredith; Georgeanne; Trisha; Frances; Mindy; Tripp

Premiere
- Date: February 13, 1993
- Place: Manhattan Class Company; New York City

Five Women Wearing the Same Dress is a play written in 1993 by Alan Ball.

== Plot ==
The play is a comedy set at the home of the bride in Knoxville, Tennessee during the newly married couple's ostentatious wedding reception. The five bridesmaids have found refuge in the room of Meredith, the sister of the bride. The women come to realize that despite their differences, they have more in common with each other than any of them do with the bride.

== Characters ==
- Meredith Marlowe: The bride's rebellious, pot-smoking younger sister who is very sarcastic and much annoyed with the whole fiasco downstairs. Sporting an outwardly tough attitude, she has a lot of insecurity to hide. Bridesmaid.
- Georgeanne Darby: Tracy's "ugly sidekick" in high school and college. Has accepted the invitation to be a bridesmaid even though her relationship with Tracy is strained because Tracy's boyfriend once got her pregnant. Bridesmaid.
- Trisha: One of Tracy's former friends with a supposed bad reputation; a jaded beauty. Bridesmaid.
- Frances: The very naive and religious cousin of the bride. Bridesmaid.
- Mindy McClure: The groom's clumsy and outspoken lesbian sister. Bridesmaid.
- Tripp Davenport (Griffen Lyle Davenport the Third): An usher who falls for Trisha. The only male seen in the show.
- Tommy Valentine: Not seen in the play. However, he is Tracy's former fiance and has hit on or slept with all of her bridesmaids and many other unsuspecting women. He leaves the wedding reception with a woman in a backless dress.
- Tracy Marlowe-McClure: The bride, who is never seen in the play.
- Scott McClure: The groom, who is also never seen in the play.

== Cast and crew ==
Production	Manhattan Class Company Crew
Director	Melia Bensussen
Set Designer	Rob Odorisio
Lighting Designer	Howard Werner
Costume Designer	Karen Perry
Sound Designer	Bruce Ellman
Production Managers	Laura Kravets Gautier and Ira Mont
Stage Managers	Hazel Youngs and Katherine Lumb

Role	Manhattan Class Company Cast
Frances	Dina Spybey
Meredith	Amelia Campbell
Trisha	Ally Walker
Georgeanne	Betsy Aidem
Mindy	Allison Janney
Tripp	Thomas Gibson
Understudies	Orlagh Cassidy, Jack Gwaltney, and Linda Marie Larson
