= Souléymane Sy Savané =

Ivorian actor

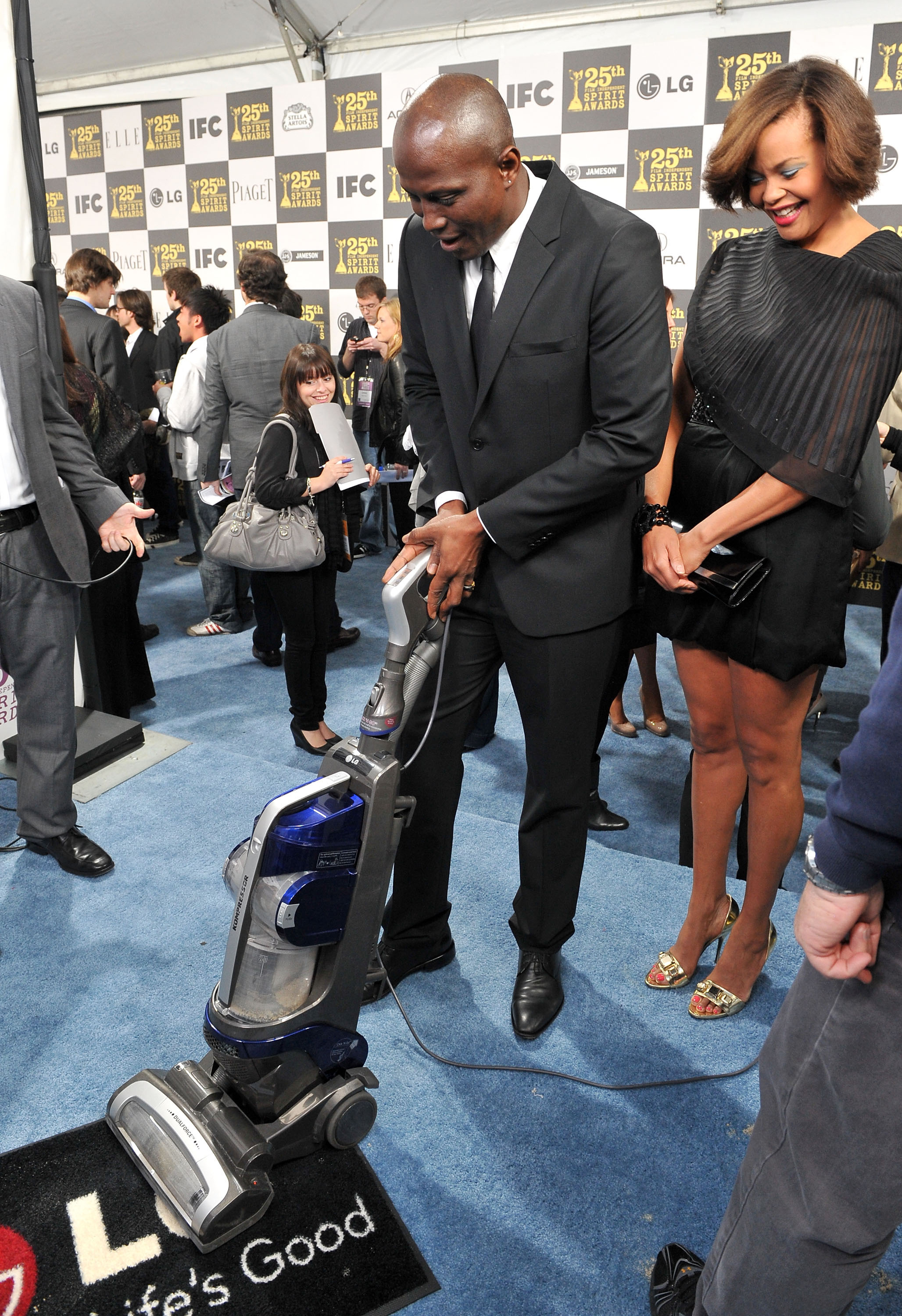
- Savané at the 25th Independent Spirit Awards in March 2010
- Born: Côte d'Ivoire
- Occupation: actor

Souléymane Sy Savané is an Ivorian actor. He is best known for his role in the drama film Goodbye Solo (2008).

== Life and career ==
Born in Côte d'Ivoire, Sy Savané moved to Paris and also worked as a flight attendant for Air Afrique. Air Afrique secured him a visa for travel to the US, and in 2000, Sy Savané settled in New York, where he studied acting before being cast in Goodbye Solo.

In 2008, he played the role of Solo in Ramin Bahrani's critically acclaimed independent film Goodbye Solo. He was nominated in 2009 for Independent Spirit Award for Best Male Lead and Gotham Independent Film Award for Breakthrough Actor.

He played his first stage role in 2009 when he appeared in the American premiere of Ian Bruce's South African political crime drama Groundswell, directed by Scott Eliott, at The New Group at Theatre Row in New York.

In 2011, Sy Savané also appeared in the film Machine Gun Preacher starring Gerard Butler, directed by Marc Forster. He plays the character of Deng, a Sudanese rebel.

Since Machine Gun Preacher, Sy Savané has appeared in numerous roles in television, which includes Master of None, The Detour, Madam Secretary, and Forever.

In 2019, Sy Savané starred in Suicide by Sunlight, a short film directed by Nikyatu Jusu and was also an Official Selection of the Sundance Film Festival. He also appeared in Killerman, starring Liam Hemsworth, directed by Malik Bader.

He is featured in the cast of the 2022 film Paris is in Harlem. He can next be seen in Ellie Foumbi's upcoming directorial debut, Our Father, the Devil, co-starring Babetida Sadjo. The film, which currently has a Rotten Tomatoes score of 100%, is set to be released in the USA on August 25, 2023.
