= Ingrid Jungermann =

American director, screenwriter, producer, and actor

- Occupations: Director, producer, screenwriter, actor
- Years active: 2004–present
- Known for: Women Who Kill

Ingrid Jungermann is an American director, producer, screenwriter, and actor. They are best known for Women Who Kill, their directorial film debut, and web series The Slope and F to 7th.

== Career ==
Jungermann graduated from New York University Tisch School of the Arts (NYU), with an MFA. Jungermann was selected one of the "25 New Faces of 2012" by Filmmaker magazine. In 2017, they were a recipient of the Sundance FilmTwo Fellowship.

Jungermann created their breakout web series The Slope with Desiree Akhavan while the two were postgraduate film students at NYU.

== Personal life ==
Jungermann is polyamorous, queer, and uses they/them pronouns. They publicly stated "I think you should demand to be called a queer filmmaker. It's a badge."

== Awards and nominations ==
- Independent Spirit Award for Best First Screenplay nomination for Women Who Kill
- Independent Spirit Someone to Watch Award nomination for Women Who Kill
- Tribeca Film Festival Jury Prize for Best Screenplay for Women Who Kill
- WGA Award nomination for F to 7th

== Filmography ==
=== Film ===
Year	Title	Actress	Director	Producer	Writer	Notes
2004	Viewpoint		Yes		Yes	Short film
2004	American Primitive	Brenda				
2008	Love Sucks		Yes	Yes	Yes	Short film
2010	Unring the Bell		Yes	Yes	Yes	Short film
2011	Sucker		Yes	Yes	Yes	Short film
2011	Back to the Dust		Yes	Yes	Yes	Short film
2012	Kyakä La Na			Yes		Short film
2013	See You Next Tuesday					
2014	Lyle	June				
2016	Women Who Kill	Morgan	Yes		Yes	
2020	Park View		Yes			Feature Film

=== Television ===
Year	Title	Actress	Director	Producer	Writer	Notes
2010–2012	The Slope	Ingrid	Yes	Yes	Yes	Web series
2013–2014	F to 7th	Ingrid	Yes	Yes	Yes	Web series
2015	Drama: The Web Series				Yes	Web mini-series; 5 episodes
2018	Take My Wife		Yes			7 episodes
2019-2020	In the Dark		Yes			2 episodes
2022	The Serpent Queen		Yes			2 episodes

== See also ==
- List of female film and television directors
- List of lesbian filmmakers
- List of LGBT-related films directed by women
