= Diane Crespo =

American film producer

Diane Crespo is a producer and director of feature films and documentaries. She co-founded Cicala Filmworks in 1997.

Her film credits include Arranged (director/producer), Clutter (director), My Last Day Without You (producer) and Contested Streets (producer).
