= Joshua Harmon (playwright) =

American playwright (born 1983)

- Born: 1983 (age 42–43); New York City, New York, U.S.
- Education: Northwestern University (BA); Carnegie Mellon University (MFA); Juilliard School (GrDip)
- Occupation: Playwright
- Writing career
- Genres: Comedy, autobiography
- Notable works: Bad Jews; Admissions

Joshua Harmon (born 1983) is a New York City-based playwright, whose works include Bad Jews and Significant Other, both produced Off-Broadway by Roundabout Theatre Company.

Harmon is the recipient of two Drama Desk Awards for Outstanding Play and two Outer Critics Circle Awards for Outstanding Off-Broadway Play. His plays have been produced on Broadway, off-Broadway, on the West End, and internationally in a dozen countries.

== Early life and education ==
Harmon was born in Manhattan and was raised in Brooklyn and the suburbs (of New York). He is a graduate of Northwestern University, Carnegie Mellon University, and Juilliard where he worked with playwrights Christopher Durang and Marsha Norman.

== Work ==
Christopher Wallenberg, in The Boston Globe, wrote that a "penchant for biting commentary suffuses Harmon’s fiercely funny yet poignant plays." Harmon said "I think I became really engaged by plays that are character-driven and that are grappling with some kind of moral question.”

=== Bad Jews (2012) ===
Bad Jews was the first play of Harmon's to be performed for longer than three nights.

After its success in 2012 in Roundabout Theatre Company's 63-seat black box theatre, Bad Jews transferred to the company's 420-seat theatre the next year. Bad Jews went on to be the third most-produced play in America in the 2014–2015 season, and earned nominations for best play from the Outer Critics Circle and the Lucille Lortel awards. It also ran for five months on the West End in London at the Arts Theatre, after sold-out runs at London's St. James and Theatre Royal Bath, and has had productions in Australia, Canada, Germany, Israel, Poland and South Africa.

=== Significant Other (2015) ===
The Roundabout Theatre Company produced Significant Other Off-Broadway at the Laura Pels Theatre. The play premiered on May 16, 2015 in previews, officially on June 18, and closed on August 16, 2015. Directed by Trip Cullman, the cast featured Sas Goldberg, Gideon Glick, Carra Paterson, Lindsay Mendez, Luke Smith, John Behlmann and Barbara Barrie. The play involves the lives of four college friends and their search for relationships. It was included in the New York Times Top Ten Productions of 2015. Significant Other is forthcoming from Samuel French. The play was produced by the SpeakEasy Stage Company, Boston Massachusetts, in September to October 2016. Harmon explained the premise: “How do you make life work for yourself when you feel that you’re not living the life you’re supposed to be living or want to be living? And how do you deal with that when the changes that you need to make are in some ways outside of your control?” Harmon further noted that he did not intend to write a comedy. “I honestly thought that I’d written the saddest play... I don’t write thinking about the comedy. I am genuinely always surprised when something winds up being funny.”

The play began previews on Broadway on February 14, 2017 at the Booth Theatre. Directed by Trip Cullman, the Off-Broadway cast reprised their roles for the Broadway production, with the exception of Patterson, who was replaced by Rebecca Naomi Jones.

=== Ivanka: A Medea for Right Now (2016) ===
On the eve of the 2016 presidential election, four theaters held staged readings of Ivanka: A Medea for Right Now a reimagining of the Greek tragedy Medea inspired by the daughter of presidential candidate Donald Trump.

=== Admissions (2018) ===
Admissions opened Off-Broadway at the Lincoln Center Theater, Mitzi E. Newhouse Theater on February 15, 2018, in previews, officially on March 12. Directed by Daniel Aukin, the cast includes Ben Edelman, Andrew Garman, Jessica Hecht, Ann McDonough and Sally Murphy. The play involves the values and ambitions of a couple who work in an exclusive school and their son. The play received an Edgerton Foundation New Play Award. The play won the 2018 Outer Critics Circle Award, Outstanding New Off-Broadway Play, and the 2018 Drama Desk Award, Outstanding Play.

=== Skintight (2018) ===
Skintight is a play commissioned by the Roundabout Theatre Company. It premiered Off-Broadway at the Laura Pels Theatre from May 31, 2018 in previews, officially on June 21, 2018 to August 26, 2018. The play revolves around Jodi and her father, and "the nature of love." The play received the Edgerton Foundation New Play Award for 2017. The play starred Idina Menzel as Jodi Isaac, and was directed by Daniel Aukin.

=== Prayer for the French Republic (2022) ===
Prayer for the French Republic opened Off-Broadway at New York City Center Stage I on February 1, 2022 in a production by Manhattan Theatre Club. Directed by David Cromer, the cast starred Betsy Aidem, Yair Ben-Dor, Francis Benhamou, Ari Brand, Pierre Epstein, Peyton Lusk, Molly Ranson, Nancy Robinette, Jeff Seymour, Kenneth Tigar, and Richard Topol. The show follows five generations of a Jewish family living in France as they deal with anti-Semitism and the repeated question of "Are we safe?" The play won the 2022 Drama Desk Award for Outstanding Play, the 2022 Outer Critics Circle Award for Outstanding Off-Broadway Play, and the inaugural Theater J Trish Vradenburg Jewish Play Prize.

On June 1, 2023, it was announced that the Manhattan Theatre Club would be producing the play on Broadway at its Samuel J. Friedman Theatre, with Cromer returning to direct and performances set to begin December 19, with an opening night of January 9, 2024. The play was nominated for 3 Tony Awards, for Best Play, Best Actress and Best Lighting Design.

=== We Had a World (2025) ===
We Had a World began performances Off-Broadway at New York City Center Stage II on February 25, 2025, in previews, and officially on March 19, closing on May 11, 2025 in a production by Manhattan Theatre Club. Directed by Trip Cullman, the three-person cast included Joanna Gleason, Andrew Barth Feldman, and Jeanine Serallis.

The play is had its regional premiere at the Huntington Theatre Company in Boston, Massachusetts, beginning on February 12, 2026.

Hampstead Theatre's Downstairs is currently hosting the European premiere, directed by Josh Seymour, starring Suzanne Bertish, Anna Francolini and Ryan Kopel. Previews began 29 May, with the production running until 4 July 2026.

== Honors ==
He received a 2024 Guggenheim fellowship.

He was Playwright in Residence at the 2013 National Playwrights Conference of the Eugene O'Neill Theater Center (Waterford, Connecticut).

He was in residence at SPACE at Ryder Farm in Brewster, New York.

While at the MacDowell Colony (Peterborough, New Hampshire) he started writing Bad Jews. He was the 2010–2011 National New Play Network Playwright-in-Residence at Actor's Express, Atlanta, Georgia. He also worked on Bad Jews while in residence.

== Awards ==
- 2025 Lucille Lortel Award Nomination for Best Play for We Had A World
- 2024 Tony Award Nomination for Best Play for Prayer for the French Republic
- 2022 Outer Critics Circle Award for Outstanding New Off-Broadway Play for Prayer for the French Republic - winner
- 2022 Drama Desk Award for Outstanding Play for Prayer for the French Republic - winner
- 2022 Lucille Lortel Award Nomination for Best Play for Prayer for the French Republic
- 2022 Drama League Award Nomination for Best Play for Prayer for the French Republic
- 2018 Outer Critics Circle Award for Outstanding New Off-Broadway Play for Admissions - winner
- 2018 Drama Desk Award for Outstanding Play for Admissions - winner
- 2014 Lucille Lortel Award Nomination for Best Play for Bad Jews
- 2013 Outer Critics Circle Award Nomination for John Gassner Award for Bad Jews
- 2013 Outer Critics Circle Award Nomination for Outstanding New Off-Broadway Play for Bad Jews
