= Tracee Chimo =

American stage and film actress (born 1979)

Tracee Chimo Pallero
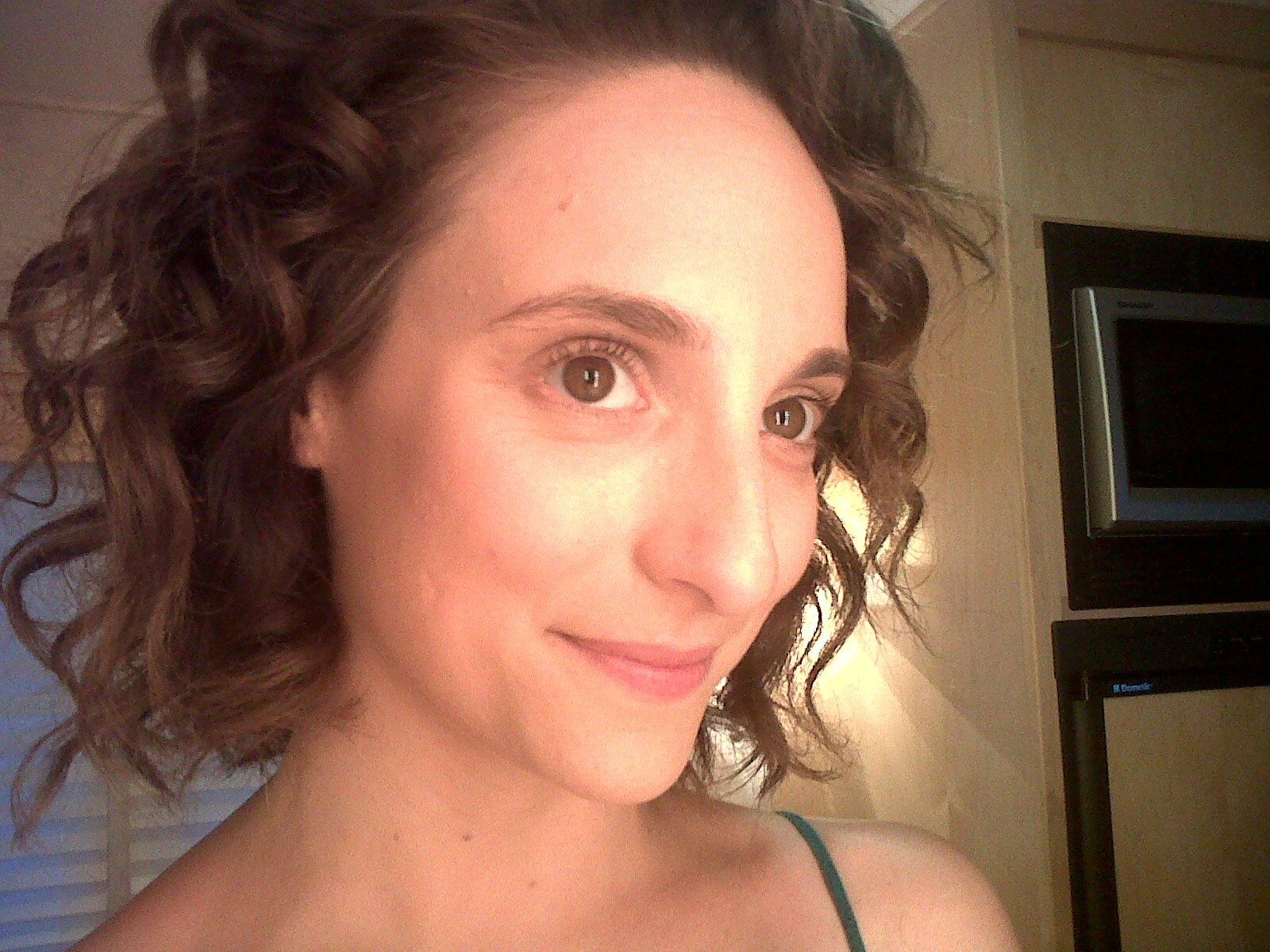
- Tracee Chimo Pallero
- Born: May 23, 1979 (age 47); Saugus, Massachusetts, U.S.
- Occupation: Actress
- Years active: 2006–present

Tracee Chimo Pallero (born 1979) is an American stage, television and film actress who became an arts critic favorite after her 2012 breakout role as Daphna Feygenbaum, the antagonist in Joshua Harmon’s hit dark comedy Bad Jews.

In 2018 she married Canadian cameraman Richard Joseph Pallero, after meeting and falling in love on the set of her first television series, TBS’ cult comedy People of Earth.

== Early life ==
Chimo was born in Saugus, Massachusetts. Her father is of Albanian descent and her mother is of Irish and Italian ancestry (her father is an Albanian Orthodox Christian, and her mother is Catholic). She splits her time between living in Los Angeles and New York City.

== Career ==
Chimo's 2010 work in the plays Bachelorette and Circle Mirror Transformation was praised by Erik Piepenburg of The New York Times, who lauded Chimo for transforming herself into two characters so distinct from one another, commenting, "If, at the same time, you could meet the shy, expressionless Lauren, mumbling into the wall of her red hoodie, and the glittering, claws-extended Regan, the meanest predator on the hunt, it would be hard to believe that they are the same person underneath. And maybe they aren’t — even if the actress Tracee Chimo channeled those characters to critical acclaim in two Off-Broadway plays this season." Chimo's performance in Mirror was also singled out by Elisabeth Vincentelli of the New York Post, who called her "a master of the comic silent reaction."

In 2012, Charles Isherwood of The New York Times, who also noted Chimo's performances in these two productions, called her work in the Broadway revival of Harvey "excellent". Echoing other critic's, Isherwood stated, "What's most startling about this actress is her versatility: she seems to be almost physically transformed from performance to performance, so deeply does she burrow into her characters’ identities. I didn’t recognize her at all, with her hair a frizzy nimbus of angry-looking dark curls and her face scrubbed free of makeup, in keeping with Daphna’s righteous self-seriousness."

In 2016, TBS premiered the TV comedy series People of Earth, on which Chimo plays Chelsea Healey.

== Awards and nominations ==
2014 Lucille Lortel Win for "Outstanding Lead Actress in a Play" for Bad Jews

2013 Outer Critics Circle Award nomination for "Outstanding Lead Actress - Bad Jews

2013 Drama League Award nomination for "Distinguished Performance - Bad Jews

2013 Rising Star Award - Winner from the Salem State University Alumni Association

2011 Stage Scene Award LA for "Best Performance by a Featured Actress in a Drama" for her work in Neil LaBute's The Break of Noon

2011 Clarence Derwent Award on June 14 for "Most Promising Actress in New York City"

2011 Lucille Lortel Nomination for "Outstanding Lead Actress" in Bachelorette

2010 Drama Desk Award for "Outstanding Ensemble Performance" in Circle Mirror Transformation

2010 Obie Award for Circle Mirror Transformation

2010 Lucille Lortel Nomination for "Outstanding Featured Actress" in Circle Mirror Transformation

== Filmography ==
=== Film ===
Year	Title	Role
2012	The Five-Year Engagement	Margaret
2013	He's Way More Famous Than You	Tracee
2013	Gods Behaving Badly	River Styx
2013	Concussion	Woman #2
2013	Side Effects	Receptionist
2013	Take Care	Rachel
2014	Cyber	Secretary
2016	Sully	Evelyn May

=== Television ===
Year	Title	Role	Notes
2010	Guiding Light	Jamie Collick	
2010	Louie	Dog Pound Volunteer	Episode: "Dogpound"
2011	Inside the Actor’s Studio Apartment	Actress	
2012	First Dates with Toby Harris	Michelle	Episode: "Movies"
2012	I Just Want My Pants Back	Dylan	
2013–2019	Orange Is the New Black	Neri Feldman	recurring role
2013	The Good Wife	Chrissy Quinn	Episode: "Outside the Bubble"
2014	The Money	Jane Mulvaney	Pilot
2013	Black Box	Mackenzie Teller	5 episodes
2014	Royal Pains	Lauren	Episode: "Oh, M.G."
2015	High Maintenance	Orly	Episode: "Esme"
2015–2017	Difficult People	Gaby	6 episodes
2016–2017	People of Earth	Chelsea Healey	10 episodes
2018–2019	Madam Secretary	Nina Cummings	
2018	Genius	Gertrude Stein	
2020	The Undoing	Rebecca Harkness	

=== Theatre ===
Year	Play	Role	Theatre	Notes
2006	After Ashley	Julie Bell	Philadelphia Theatre Company, Regional	
2007	Guilty	Lindsey	Acorn Theater, Off-Broadway	
2008	All Hail Hurricane Gordo	India	Actors Theatre of Louisville, Regional	
2008	Vendetta Chrome	Tallulah	Clubbed Thumb, Off-Off-Broadway	
2008	Irena’s Vow	Fanka Silberman	Rose Nagelberg Theatre, Off-Broadway	
2009	Irena’s Vow	Fanka Silberman	Walter Kerr Theatre, Broadway	
2009	Circle Mirror Transformation	Lauren	Playwrights Horizons, Off-Broadway	
2010	Bachelorette	Regan	Second Stage Theatre, Off-Broadway	
2010	The Break of Noon	Jenny/Gigi	Lucille Lortel Theatre, Off-Broadway	
2011	The Break of Noon	Jenny/Gigi	Geffen Playhouse, Regional	
2012	Harvey	Myrtle Mae Simmons	Studio 54, Broadway	
2012	Bad Jews	Daphna	Roundabout Underground, Off-Broadway	
2013	Bad Jews	Daphna	Laura Pels Theatre, Off-Broadway	
2014	Lips Together, Teeth Apart	Chloe Haddock	Second Stage Theater, Off-Broadway	
2015	The Heidi Chronicles	Fran/Molly/Betsy/April	Music Box Theatre, Broadway	
2016	Noises Off	Poppy Norton-Taylor	American Airlines Theatre, Broadway	
2016–2017	Fingersmith	Sue Trinder	American Repertory Theater, Regional	
