= Ilan Goodman =

British actor

Ilan Goodman is an English actor who trained at RADA. He is the son of English actor Henry Goodman. He has appeared extensively on stage in the UK including the UK premieres of Adam Rapp's Red Light Winter Lynn Nottage's Intimate Apparel, and Joshua Harmon's Bad Jews.

He is also the producer and host of the podcast NOUS, where he interviews philosophers, neuroscientists and psychiatrists.

== Filmography ==
=== Television ===
| Year | Film | Role | Notes |
|---|---|---|---|
| 2009 | Broadside | Pepys | TV movie |
| 2014 | Call the Midwife | Charlie Moss | Episode #3.4 |
| 2014 | A Long Way Down | Sam Hothead | Episode #3.2 |
| 2015 | Holby City | Spike | Series 17 Episode 35 |

=== Films ===
| Year | Film | Role | Notes |
|---|---|---|---|
| 2009 | Echelon Conspiracy | Dennis | |
| 2013 | Diana | Diana Assistant 1 | |
| 2014 | The Imitation Game | Keith Furman | |
