= Paris Is in Harlem =

Paris is in Harlem
- Directed by: Christina Kallas
- Written by: Christina Kallas
- Produced by: Christina Kallas; Josh Mandel
- Starring: Vandit Bhatt
- Release date: 2022 (Slamdance)
- Running time: 111 minutes
- Country: United States
- Language: English

Paris is in Harlem is a 2022 American drama film written and directed by Christina Kallas and starring Vandit Bhatt.

== Cast ==
- Chris Veteri as Ike
- Vandit Bhatt as Ben
- Leon Addison Brown as Sam
- Ellie Foumbi as Michelle
- Kojo Roney as Job
- Tim Eliot as Jason
- Laura Pruden as Sila
- Lauren Sowa as Alis
- Souléymane Sy Savané as Serenity
- Steve Vause as Arthur
- Marlon Martinez as Marlon
- Spaceman Patterson as Space
- Antoine Roney as Antoine
- Tomoki Sanders as Tomoki
- Camille Thurman as Camille

== Release ==
The film premiered at the 2022 Slamdance Film Festival.

== Reception ==
On the review aggregator website Rotten Tomatoes, 100% of 6 critics' reviews are positive.

Alexandra Heller-Nicholas of the Alliance of Women Film Journalists gave the film a positive review and wrote, "a joyful, loving, euphoric snapshot of a city and its people at a key historical moment, Paris is in Harlem delights in letting the jazz flow."

Kyle Bain of Film Threat rated the film a 7 out of 10, and wrote, "a visual masterpiece (...) seems skewed to only want to reach specific audience members and not everyone as a whole."
