= Faizon Love =

Cuban-American actor and comedian

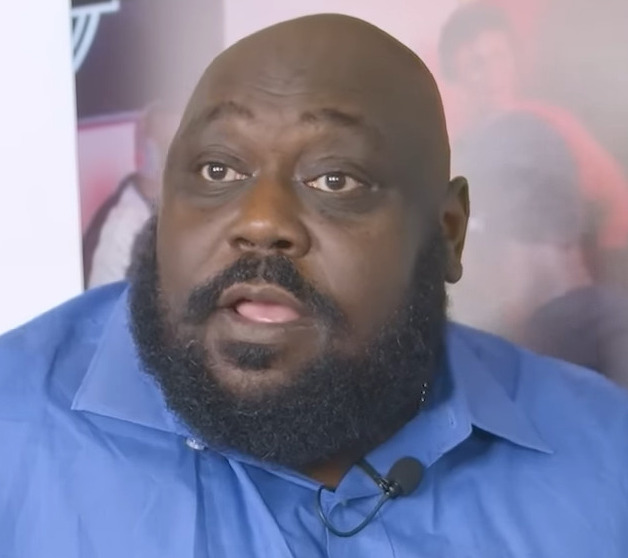
- Love in 2025
- Born: Langston Faizon Santisima; June 14, 1968 (age 58); Santiago de Cuba, Cuba
- Citizenship: US
- Occupations: Actor; comedian
- Years active: 1983–present

Langston Faizon Santisima (born June 14, 1968), better known by the stage name Faizon Andre Love, is a Cuban-American actor and comedian. He is best known for roles in the comedy films The Meteor Man (1993), Friday (1995), Don't Be a Menace to South Central While Drinking Your Juice in the Hood (1996), B.A.P.S. (1997), The Replacements (2000), Made, Mr Bones (both 2001), Blue Crush (2002), Elf (2003) and Couples Retreat (2009). As a voice actor, he portrayed Sean "Sweet" Johnson in the action-adventure game Grand Theft Auto: San Andreas (2004) and on television played Wendell Wilcox on the sitcom The Parent 'Hood (1995–1999).

== Early life ==
Love says he was born in Santiago de Cuba on June 14, 1968. In a 2026 podcast appearance with Barry Katz, Love said he felt the need to be vague in discussions about how he and his family departed Cuba during his infancy, and he declined to say if anyone defected, but he implied money was paid to expedite the process.

He described himself as a military brat who was raised in Southeast San Diego, California, and Newark, New Jersey, because of his father's career in the United States Navy. He graduated from Morse High School in San Diego.

== Career ==
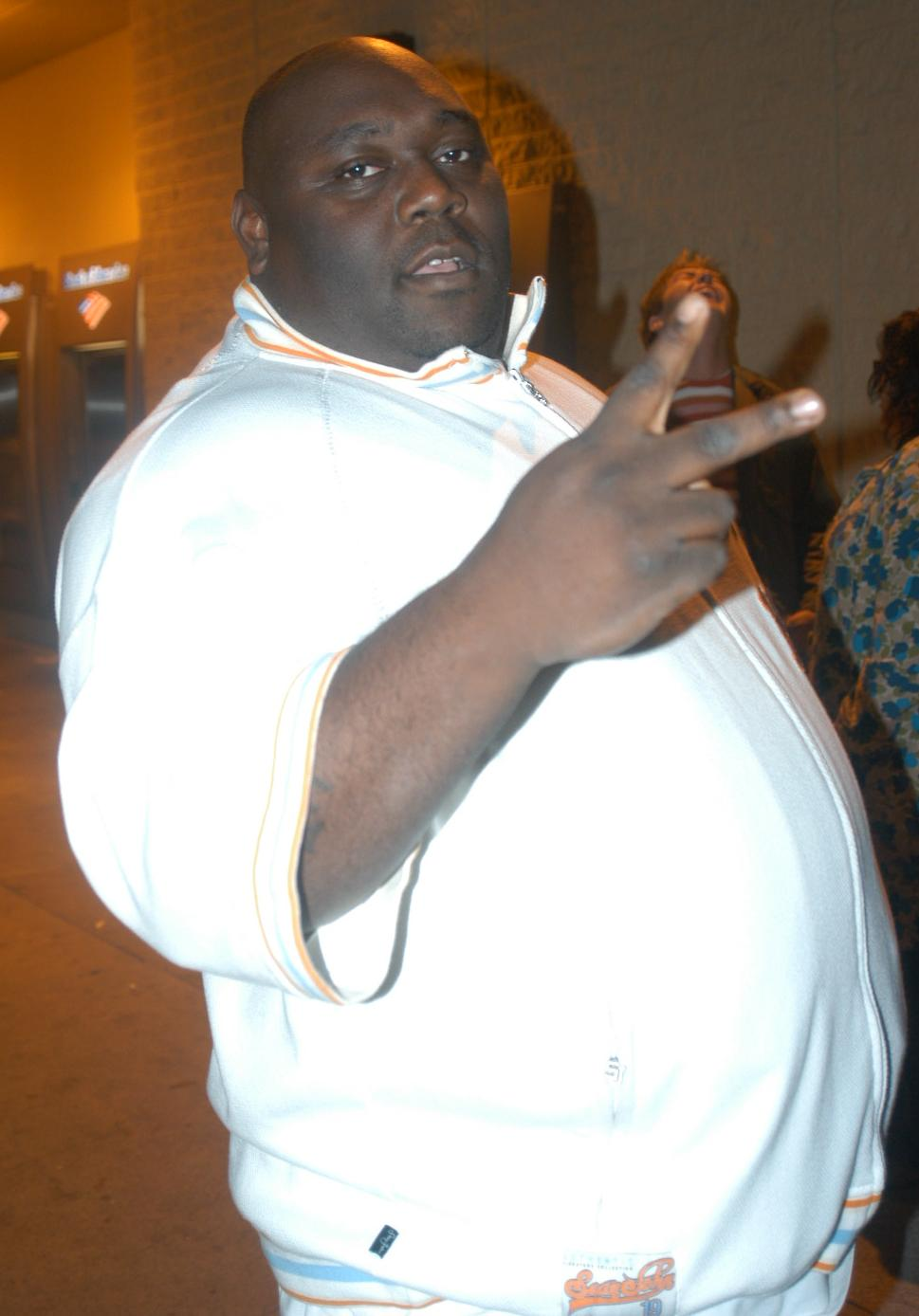
Love in 2005

Love got his start as a stand-up comedian at age 15, and made his acting debut in an off-Broadway play at the age of 19. His film debut was the animated comedy Bebe's Kids, for which he provided the voice of Robin Harris whose concept was used to create the film but who died before production began. Love offered a close vocal impression of Harris, and was credited under the Faizon Love name.

Love's live-action debut was a supporting role in The Meteor Man, starring Robert Townsend. Townsend then cast Love in a co-starring role on his sitcom The Parent 'Hood. Love's breakout performance was as drug supplier Big Worm in the 1995 film Friday.

Follow-up films have included 3 Strikes, Elf, Don't Be a Menace to South Central While Drinking Your Juice in the Hood, Money Talks, Wonderland, The Fighting Temptations, and Idlewild. In 2001, Love guest-starred in the Ludacris single "Freaky Thangs" from the album Word of Mouf. The same year, he made a cameo appearance as a bus driver, in the music video for Lil Jon & The East Side Boys' single "Put Yo Hood Up".

Love lent his voice to the video game Grand Theft Auto: San Andreas (2004), portraying Sean "Sweet" Johnson, the leader of the Grove Street Families and the older brother of the game's protagonist. He co-starred in Couples Retreat (2009), a comedy film chronicling four couples who partake in therapy sessions at a tropical island resort.

In 2012, he played Stringer Bell in a satirical trailer for The Wire: The Musical. In June of that year, he started to appear in a series of commercials for Boost Mobile, promoting its new 4G phones.

== Controversy, lawsuits, and arrests ==
In 2014, Love posted a series of controversial tweets in the wake of the sexual assault cases against Bill Cosby. Defending Cosby against the charges, he used profanity and racial slurs against Cosby's accusers as well as comedian Hannibal Buress, who had been credited with bringing wider attention to the allegations in a stand-up routine. In 2015, Love once again posted tweets in defense of Cosby, dismissing his fellow African-Americans who believed the allegations as "spineless monkeys".

On March 7, 2017, Love was arrested on a charge of misdemeanor assault in Columbus, Ohio. An altercation with a valet had occurred at John Glenn Columbus International Airport, with video evidence showing Love grabbing the valet behind the neck in the baggage claim area and throwing him onto the ground and into a desk. Love pleaded not guilty, but he later pleaded no contest and received a $500 fine and a 180-day suspended jail sentence.

In 2017, Love terminated his contract with talent management firm The Gersh Agency. He subsequently did not pay agreed commissions to Gersh for its role in negotiating his appearances on Step Up: High Water, saying their oral agreement did not amount to a binding contract. This led to Gersh filing a complaint with the California Department of Industrial Relations. A 2021 ruling came down in Gersh's favor, saying Love was free to end his relationship with Gersh, but also noting that emails Love exchanged with Gersh on the Step Up negotiations amounted to a binding contract which he was obligated to fulfill as originally agreed.

In 2018, a personal assistant to Love sued him for sexual harassment; the case was later settled.

In 2022, a personal assistant to Love, Hevekiah Walker, sued him and his company, Assembly Robot Inc., alleging that Love sexually harassed her during her five-month tenure as Love's personal assistant in Love's Gwinnett County home. Neither Love nor his company responded to the complaint leading to a default judgment against them in 2023, the court awarding Walker $500,000 plus approximately $43,000 in interest and costs. In June 2024, Walker filed a garnishment against NBCUniversal to recover any residual payments due Love that NBCUniversal held. NBCUniversal failed to respond to the garnishment, and a $543,652 default judgment was rendered against it. Then NBCUniversal missed another deadline in failing to seek to modify the judgment within 90 more days. After finally attempting to void the default judgment, which attempt was unsuccessful, on August 26, 2025, NBCUniversal appealed the judgment to the Georgia Supreme Court claiming it was arbitrary to be responsible for the entire judgment, as it claimed it had just $652 in residual payments due to Love that could be originally garnished.

In February 2025, Love was accused of attacking a female hotel clerk with a credit card machine after she told him she could not give him the room he booked through a third party. In July 2025, a San Diego County California judge said there was enough evidence to move the felony case forward. Love has pleaded not guilty. On June 16, 2026, he was arrested in Tampa, Florida, after failing to appear in court in connection to a paternity suit filed against him by Tiffany Lee, the mother of his child. He was held without bond and served 16 days for contempt of court.

== Filmography ==
=== Film ===
Year	Title	Role	Notes
1992	Bebe's Kids	Robin Harris (voice)	
1993	The Meteor Man	Husband	
1994	Fear of a Black Hat	"Jam Boy"	
1995	Friday	"Big Worm"	
1996	Don't Be a Menace	Rufus	
1996	A Thin Line Between Love and Hate	Manny	
1997	B*A*P*S	"Tiger J"	
1997	Money Talks	Cellmate	
1998	The Players Club	Officer Peters	
2000	3 Strikes	"Tone"	
2000	The Replacements	Jahmal Abdul Jackson	
2001	Inhumanity	Unknown Role	Video
2001	Made	Horrace	
2001	Mr Bones	"Fats" Pudbedder	
2002	Play'd: A Hip Hop Story	"Domino" Breed	TV movie
2002	Blue Crush	Leslie	
2003	Wonderland	Greg Diles	
2003	The Fighting Temptations	Luther Washington	
2003	Elf	Wanda	
2003	Ride or Die	David Rabinawitz	Video
2004	Torque	Sonny	
2005	The Luau	"Hustle"	
2005	Animal	"Double T"	Video
2006	Just My Luck	Damon Phillips	
2006	All You've Got	Coach Harlan	TV movie
2006	Idlewild	"Sunshine Ace"	
2007	Who's Your Caddy?	"Big Large"	
2007	The Perfect Holiday	Jamal	
2008	Of Boys and Men	Roman	
2008	Days of Wrath	"Cash Flow"	
2009	A Day in the Life	Ike "Black Ike" Smith	
2009	Steppin: The Movie	Unknown Role	
2009	Couples Retreat	Shane	
2010	Life as We Know It	Cab Driver	
2011	Big Mommas: Like Father, Like Son	Kurtis Kool	
2011	King of the Underground	Faizon	
2011	Zookeeper	Bruce The Bear (voice)	
2011	The Cookout 2	David Turner	TV movie
2011	Budz House	"Big Shitty"	
2012	The Wire: The Musical	Russell "Stringer" Bell	Short
2012	The Paperboy	Comedian	
2013	White T	Anthony	
2014	Matthew 18	Lifton Tyler	
2014	Tell	Dwight Johnson	
2015	November Rule	Theo	
2015	Brotherly Love	Uncle Ron	
2016	She's Got a Plan	Dr. Funkman	
2017	Grow House	Reg "Rollin Reg"	
2017	Ripped	Reeves	
2018	Bad Paramedics	Craig	Short
2020	Bulletproof 2	Jack Carter	
2020	She Ball	Big Meat Tuna	
2020	The War with Grandpa	David	
2021	Fuck Child Support the Animated Movie	Mr. Mack	Short
2022	Block Party	Gus	
2022	Santa Games	Santa Charles	
2023	The Sandlerverse 2	Bruce The Bear	Short
2023	Prince of Detroit	Teddy Hall	
2023	Back on the Strip	Desmond "Da Body" Day	
2023	The Last Stop in Yuma County	Vernon	

=== Television ===
Year	Title	Role	Notes
1992	An Evening at the Improv	Himself	Episode: "Episode #10.14"
1993	Def Comedy Jam	Himself	Episode: "Episode #3.5"
1995	What a Cartoon!	Sledgehammer O' Possum (voice)	Episode: "Sledgehammer O'Possum: Out and About"
1995-1998	The Parent 'Hood	Wendell Wilcox	Recurring cast: Season 1, Main cast: Season 2–4
1996	The Wayans Bros.	Nigel Lovejoy	Episode: "Mama, I Wanna Act"
2002	Dinner for Five	Himself	Episode: "Episode #1.7"
2004	The Big House	Warren Cleveland	Main cast
2004	Dinner for Five	Himself	Episode: "Episode #3.1"
2004	That's So Raven	Cyrus	Episode: "Radio Heads"
2005	Dinner for Five	Himself	Episode: "Episode #4.6"
2007	It's Always Sunny in Philadelphia	Coach	Episode: "The Gang Gets Invincible"
2008	Black Poker Stars Invitational	Himself	Main guest
2009	My Name Is Earl	Reverend Greene	Episode: "Gospel"
2013	Big Morning Buzz Live	Himself / Panelist	Episode: "Maggie Q/Joan & Melissa Rivers/Cast of '21 & Over'"
2013	Mr. Box Office	"Big" Whane	Episode: "There Goes the Neighborhood"
2013-2016	Real Husbands of Hollywood	Himself	Recurring cast: Season 1 & 4–5, Guest: Season 2
2015-2017	Black-ish	Sha	Guest cast: Season 2–3
2017	Wild 'N Out	Himself / Team Captain	Episode: "Faizon Love/2 Milly"
2017	Hip Hop Squares	Himself / Panelist	Recurring Panelist
2017	The New Edition Story	Maurice Starr	Episode: "Part 1"
2018	Detroiters	Farmer Zack	Episode: "Farmer Zack"
2018-2022	Step Up: High Water	Al Baker	Main cast
2023	Diners, Drive-ins and Dives	Himself	Episode: "Smokin' Southern Decadence"
2023	The Upshaws	Terry	Episode: "Thera Please"

=== Music Videos ===
Year	Song	Artist	Role
1995	"Keep Their Heads Ringin'"	Dr. Dre	Thief
2003	"Gossip Folks"	Missy Elliott featuring Ludacris	Teacher
2004	"Roses"	Outkast	Himself
2005	"We Belong Together"	Mariah Carey	Minister
2012	"Ring Finger"	Lil Playy	Father
2016	"Drum Machine"	Big Grams featuring Skrillex	Bike Cop

=== Video Game ===
Year	Title	Role	Notes
2004	Grand Theft Auto: San Andreas	Sean "Sweet" Johnson	Voice role
2021	Grand Theft Auto: The Trilogy – The Definitive Edition	Sean "Sweet" Johnson	Archival recordings Remaster of Grand Theft Auto: San Andreas only

=== Documentary ===
Year	Title
2009	Why We Laugh: Black Comedians on Black Comedy

== See also ==
- List of Afro-Latinos
