= Ripped (film) =

2001 film by Bob Spiers

- Directed by: Brad Epstein
- Produced by: Jorge Bared; Paul Canterna; Peggy Chen; Sanjan Dhody; Brad Epstein; James Wiley Fowler; Matthew Helderman; Steven Marmalstein; Marvin J Miller; Jason Moring; Mark Padilla; Stanley Preschutti; Ike Suri; Jaclyn Ann Suri
- Starring: Faizon Love; Russell Peters; Alex Meneses
- Cinematography: Philip Roy
- Edited by: Amy Colla; Mitch Rosin
- Music by: Aaron Kaplan
- Release date: 23 June 2017
- Running time: 97 minutes
- Country: United States
- Language: English

Ripped is a 2017 American stoner comedy film starring Faizon Love, Russell Peters and Alex Meneses. Two stoners find themselves in the future after they smoke marijuana developed by the CIA. However, chaos erupt when they struggle to adapt to the lifestyle change.

== Plot ==
Two friends smoke some marijuana produced by the CIA in 1986 and time travel to 2016.

== Cast ==
- Faizon Love as Reeves
- Russell Peters as Harris
- Alex Meneses as Debbie
- Kyle Massey as Young Reeves
- Vandit Bhatt as Young Harris
- Stephanie Drapeau as Dr. Gales
- Mary Skaggs as Joe
- Farah White as Julie
- Carlos Gómez as Mr. Sanchez
- Bridger Zadina as Brad
- Tom Booker as Caswell
- Michael Jastroch as Grower
- Jessica Banuelos as Young Debbie
- Michael Ferstenfeld as Bollinger

== Reception ==
On the review aggregator website Rotten Tomatoes, 0% of 9 critics' reviews are positive. Metacritic, which uses a weighted average, assigned the film a score of 22 out of 100, based on 5 critics, indicating "generally unfavorable" reviews.

Adam Graham of The Detroit Press opined, "Stoner comedies serve a very specific audience, but that designation doesn’t mean they have to be slapdash, lazy films. They work best when they’re comedies first, stoner movies second — “Half Baked” knew that, but “Ripped” doesn’t." Tom Keogh of The Seattle Times said, "While there are jokes about a pair of 1980s slackers trying to make sense of the internet and cellphones, the time-travel conceit doesn’t really mean much. “Ripped” works best as a middling series of gags about being far too many tokes over the line."
