= NASSIM =

Play by Nassim Soleimanpour

NASSIM is a seventy five minute play by Nassim Soleimanpour that features new actors with no rehearsals performing each day, a format similar to Soleimanpour's prior play, White Rabbit Red Rabbit. When the actor opens the sealed envelope, it reveals the first page of the script, which eventually reunites them with the playwright, the one constant in each performance. Guest actor and playwright must navigate the boundaries, including the Persian language, throughout the performance's duration.

The show premiered in London, won the 2017 Fringe First Award at Edinburgh Fringe Festival and was performed in 20 countries in a 200-day span in 2018. It was produced Off-Broadway by Barrow Street Productions at New York City Center from December 12, 2018 – April 20, 2019. Among the actors who took a turn in the role were: Jelani Alladin, Guillermo Diaz, Will Eno, Marin Ireland, Tracy Letts, Alison Fraser, Michael Shannon, Phillipa Soo and Michael Urie.
