= Orson's Shadow =

- Poster art from the off-Broadway production
- Original language: English
- Written by: Austin Pendleton

Premiere
- Date: January 2000
- Place: Steppenwolf Theatre Company

Orson's Shadow is a play by Austin Pendleton. The play received a Lucille Lortel Award nomination for Outstanding Play and won the Drama League Award for Distinguished Performance.

== Plot ==
The play, based on true events, is set in 1960 London. In his declining years, Orson Welles is directing a production of Eugène Ionesco's Rhinoceros, starring Laurence Olivier and Joan Plowright. Olivier is fresh from his triumphant theatrical portrayal of vaudevillian Archie Rice in John Osborne's The Entertainer and is about to reprise the role in the film adaptation. He and Plowright are in the early stages of a romantic liaison; Olivier's tumultuous marriage to Vivien Leigh is all but ended. Critic Kenneth Tynan also figures in the plot, which debates the merits of stage versus screen, the internal struggle that theatrical performers endure when contemplating a leap to films, and the ways that the studio system frustrated the careers of individual artists.

It is a study of theatrical egos, each of the protagonists living more on the stage than in real life, each one feeling insecure while jockeying for power.

== Production history ==
=== United States ===
The play debuted at the Steppenwolf Theatre in Chicago in January 2000 and was performed at the Westport Country Playhouse that summer and the Old Globe Theatre in San Diego in September of that year.

The off-Broadway production, directed by David Cromer, opened on March 13, 2005 at the Barrow Street Theatre, where it ran for 349 performances. The cast included Jeff Still as Orson Welles, John Judd as Laurence Olivier, Susan Bennett as Joan Plowright, Lee Roy Rogers as Vivien Leigh, Tracy Letts as Ken Tynan, and Ian Westerfer as the stagehand Sean.

Since its New York City staging, Orson's Shadow has been mounted by a number of regional theatres, including Marin Theatre Company in Mill Valley, California, Round House Theatre in Bethesda, Maryland, Unicorn Theatre in Kansas City, Missouri, and the Gorilla Theatre in Tampa, Florida.

=== United Kingdom ===
In 2006 it received a rehearsed reading at London's Old Vic Theatre, and in July 2015 received its European premiere directed by Alice Hamilton at London's Southwark Playhouse, as part of the Orson Welles centenary. The cast included John Hodgkinson as Orson Welles, Adrian Lukis as Laurence Olivier, Louise Ford as Joan Plowright, Gina Bellman as Vivien Leigh, Edward Bennett as Kenneth Tynan, and Ciaran O'Brien as the stagehand Sean.
