= Vandit Bhatt =

American actor (born 1984)

- Born: Vandit Bhatt; August 4, 1984 (age 41); Hyderabad, India
- Occupation: Actor
- Years active: 2010–present
- Website: vanditbhatt.com

Vandit Bhatt (born August 4, 1984) is an American actor, best known for his portrayal of Kevin in the NBC sitcom The Michael J. Fox Show and as Jagdeep Patel in the third season of the ABC thriller Quantico.

== Life and career ==
Bhatt was born in Hyderabad, India and later moved to Fort Myers, Florida, when he was young. During his formative years, he attended Fort Myers Senior High School. After graduation, he commenced his studies at the University of Central Florida. Later, he obtained an undergraduate degree and started touring with multiple theatre companies.

In 2010, Bhatt made his acting debut in the NBC drama series Mercy. Following on from his first role, Bhatt won other roles on a variety of TV shows including Madam Secretary, Younger and The Michael J. Fox Show. In 2017, Bhatt starred as Young Harris in the comedy drama film Ripped, which was released in theaters on June 23, 2017.

On January 17, 2018, it was announced by Deadline that Bhatt would star in a recurring role as Jagdeep Patel in the third season of the ABC thriller Quantico.

From 2018 to 2019, Vandit starred as Rohan Kapoor in the NBC medical drama New Amsterdam.

== Filmography ==
=== Film ===
Year	Title	Role	Notes
2011	Winter Wrist	Veeru	Short film
2012	The Perfect Fix	Dev Patel	Short film
2016	42 Seconds of Happiness	Ben	
2017	Sure-Fire	Paranoid Screenwriter	Short film
2017	Ripped	Young Harris	
2018	Untitled Mad Dog		Short film
2018	The Rainbow Experiment	Ben	Post production
2022	Paris is in Harlem	Ben	

=== Television ===
Year	Title	Role	Notes
2010	Mercy	Middle Eastern Guy	Episode: "I Did Kill You, Didn't I?"
2012–2013	42 Short Films on 42 Seconds of Happiness	Ben	Recurring role
2013	The Michael J. Fox Show	Kevin	Episode: "Christmas"
2014	Token: The Web Series	Raj	Recurring role
2016	Younger	Male OB GYN	Episode: "P Is for Pancake"
2017	Madam Secretary	Tech	Episode: "Minefield"
2018	Seven Seconds	Male Jogger	Episode: "Pilot"
2018	Quantico	Jagdeep Patel	Recurring role
2018–2019, 2022	New Amsterdam	Rohan	Recurring role
2020	God Friended Me	Jai Patel	Episode: " 7. Instant Karma" (Season 2)
2020	FBI: Most Wanted	Atul	Episode: " Ironbound"
