= Women Who Kill =

2016 film by Ingrid Jungermann

- Theatrical release poster
- Directed by: Ingrid Jungermann
- Written by: Ingrid Jungermann
- Produced by: Ingrid Jungermann; Alex Scharfman
- Starring: Annette O'Toole; Sheila Vand; Tami Sagher; Deborah Rush; Grace Rex; Shannon Patricia O'Neill; Ann Carr
- Cinematography: Rob Leitzell
- Edited by: Ron Dulin
- Distributed by: FilmRise
- Release dates: April 15, 2016 (Tribeca Film Festival); July 26, 2017 (United States)
- Running time: 91 minutes
- Country: United States
- Language: English

Women Who Kill is a 2016 American comedy thriller film written and directed by Ingrid Jungermann and starring Annette O'Toole, Sheila Vand, Tami Sagher, Deborah Rush, Grace Rex, Shannon Patricia O'Neill, and Ann Carr. The film was released on July 26, 2017, by FilmRise.

Ingrid Jungermann plays Morgan, a serial killer-obsessed podcast host who begins to suspect her new girlfriend might be a killer herself.

== Plot ==
Exes Morgan and Jean, who are extremely popular locally for their true crime podcast that focuses on female killers, continue to live and work together despite having ended their relationship.

While volunteering at a food co-op, Morgan meets Simone, a mysterious dark haired woman who gives her number to Morgan. Morgan begins dating Simone. Shortly after, the lead organizer of the food co-op, Grace, is found dead with Simone being one of the last people to see her alive. Morgan's ex Jean, who has always been suspicious of Simone, begins to suspect that Simone might be involved in Grace's death. She begins researching Simone's background, discovering her real name is Allison Walker. Jean confronts Morgan with this information and has her listen to one of their old podcasts which includes an interview of the serial killer Josephine "The Clipper" Walker and her regret for the effect her murders had on her daughter Ally.

Though initially dismissive of Jean's suspicions, Morgan begins to become frightened of Simone and her odd behaviour. She wakes up one night to Simone setting the fire alarm off in the kitchen and Morgan finds a burnt piece of a passport photo the next day. Morgan finds Simone in an anxious state rapidly clipping her fingernails on the bed and she then attempts to clip Morgan's nails. Morgan reports this to Jean who now tells her that she has done more research on Simone and does not believe that she is a murderer anymore.

After attending her best friend Alex's bachelorette party, Morgan tucks Alex into bed as she is extremely drunk from the nights festivities. Simone spends the night at Alex's partner Kim's bachelorette party. Morgan pries open a mysterious box Simone keeps in her house and discovers an elaborate nail grooming kit and boxes containing nail clippings with the six names of the girls who were killed by "The Clipper." Scared for her own life, Morgan returns to Jean's apartment and informs her of what she found. The next morning Kim arrives at the apartment to tell them that Alex is missing. Jean and Morgan fear that she has been murdered by Simone.

Jean and Morgan begin stalking Simone, hoping she will lead them to Alex's body. Instead they accidentally run into Alex who is very much alive. Alex accuses Jean and Morgan of concocting an elaborate fantasy that Simone is a killer in order to come up with an excuse to spend time together as they have unresolved feelings for one another. The two deny the accusation and angrily part from each other.

Later on, Morgan goes to see Jean whose new boyfriend tells her that Jean went to the co-op to check up on her and Simone who were supposed to have shift there. At the co-op, Morgan finds an unconscious Jean on the ground. Simone claims Jean fell on her own. Morgan assumes that Simone hurt Jean and picks up a knife off of the ground next to the nail grooming kit to defend herself. Simone asks Morgan "What if I told you I did kill those people?" and asks Morgan if she just wants a way out of their relationship. Simone suggests that she and Morgan could have a happy and fulfilled life together, reaching forward to embrace Morgan. However she ends up accidentally impaling herself on Morgan's knife. Jean regains consciousness in time to witness the stabbing, revealing that she did accidentally hurt herself and Simone was innocent.

Leaving the co-op Morgan runs into another co-op member and explains her blood-soaked sweater by revealing she "hurt some people."

As Morgan walks down the street, the audience hears Morgan and Jean's podcast as they argue over whether or not an act of murder was done in self-defense. This dialogue of Morgan defending the murderer mirrors her own belief that she killed Simone in self-defense. Jean disagrees and claims that there was no reason to murder out of self-preservation. The two decide to poll their listeners on their thoughts.

The ending of the film comments on the fact that Morgan and Jean spend all their time studying these cases but are able to disassociate from the horrendous acts without considering how it feels to be the people they profit off of in their podcast.

== Cast ==
- Ingrid Jungermann as Morgan
- Ann Carr as Jean
- Sheila Vand as Simone
- Annette O'Toole as Lila
- Tami Sagher as Celia
- Deborah Rush as Grace
- Grace Rex as Kim
- Shannon Patricia O'Neill as Alex
- Francis Benhamou as Candice
- Doug Moe as Tailor
- Rodrigo Lopresti as Jackson
- Terence Nance as Darren
- Jacqueline Antaramian as Josephine Walker
- Keisha Zollar as Ginger
- Ngozi Jane Anyanwu as Officer Matthews
- Anna Orlova as Officer Pratt
- Kim Blanck as Alicia
- Jeremy Paschall as Officer Henderson

== Release ==
The film premiered at the Tribeca Film Festival on April 15, 2016. The film was released on July 26, 2017, by FilmRise.

== Production ==
Women Who Kill is A Parts and Labor presentation.

- Producers: Alex Scharfman, Ingrid Jungermann
- Executive producers: Cliff Chenfeld, Craig Balsam, Jim Rosenthal, Rick Milenthal, Victor Zaraya, Stacie Passon, Jay Van Hoy, Lars Knudsen
- Co-producers: Lauren Brady, Eric LaFranchi"

== Critical response ==
Rotten Tomatoes lists Women Who Kill as having a score of 100% based on reviews from 13 critics. Based on reviews from six critics such as Variety and The New York Times, Metacritic gives Women Who Kill a 78 out of 100.

== Awards ==
Year	Award	Category	Nominee	Result	Title of Award
2016	Tribeca Film Festival	Best Screenplay for a US Feature	Ingrid Jungermann	Won	Jury Award
2016	Tribeca Film Festival	Best U.S. Narrative Feature	Ingrid Jungermann	Nominated	Jury Award
2016	L.A. Outfest	Outstanding Screenwriting in a U.S. Feature	Ingrid Jungermann	Won	Grand Jury Award
2016	Indie Street Film Festival	Best Narrative Feature		Won	
2016	Frameline San Francisco International LGBTQ Film Festival	Outstanding First Feature	Ingrid Jungermann	Honorable Mention	
2016	Oslo Fusion International Film Festival	Best Feature Film	Ingrid Jungermann	Won	Jury Prize
2016	MiFo LGBT Ft. Lauderdale	Best Narrative Feature		Won	
2016	Seattle TWIST Queer Film Festival	Best Narrative Feature		Won	
2016	Melbourne Queer Film Festival	Best Narrative Feature		Won	
2016	Lost Weekend Film Festival	Best Screenplay	Ingrid Jungermann	Won	
2017	Cleveland International Film Festival	Best American Independent Feature Film	Ingrid Jungermann	Nominated	
2017	Film Independent Spirit Awards	Someone to Watch Award	Ingrid Jungermann	Nominated	Someone to Watch
2018	Film Independent Spirit Awards	Best First Screenplay	Ingrid Jungermann	Nominated	
