= Lyle (film) =

2014 film by Stewart Thorndike

- Directed by: Stewart Thorndike
- Written by: Stewart Thorndike
- Starring: Gaby Hoffmann; Ingrid Jungermann
- Cinematography: Grant Greenberg
- Edited by: Jennifer Ruff
- Music by: Jason Falkner
- Production company: Tacoma Films
- Distributed by: Breaking Glass Pictures
- Release date: July 12, 2014
- Running time: 62 minutes
- Country: United States
- Language: English

Lyle is a 2014 American psychological thriller drama film written and directed by Stewart Thorndike. The film tells the dramatic story of a mother grieving over the death of her toddler. The film stars actress Gaby Hoffmann in the lead role. Lyle was billed as "a lesbian Rosemary's Baby."

== Plot summary ==
A young couple moving into a new home suffers a guilt and grief-filled journey to losing their child. Soon mysterious feelings abound as those around them seem to harbor plans for the couple's next newborn child.

== Cast ==
- Gaby Hoffmann as Leah
- Ingrid Jungermann as June
- Eleanor Hopkins as Lyle
- Rebecca Street as Karen
- Michael Che as Threes
- Kim Allen as Taylor
- Ashlie Atkinson as Therapist

== Reception ==
Sheri Linden of The Hollywood Reporter said "Gaby Hoffmann's ferocious unraveling is the main attraction in this well-done but slightly new-millennium riff on Rosemary's Baby."
