= Christina Kallas =

Greek film director and screenwriter

- Born: Thessaloniki, Greece
- Education: Free University of Berlin (BA), (MA), (PhD)
- Occupations: Film director, writer, producer
- Years active: 1998–present

Christina Kallas is a Greek-American film director, screenwriter, and producer whose films include 42 Seconds of Happiness, The Rainbow Experiment, and Paris is in Harlem.

== Life and career ==
Kallas was born in Thessaloniki, Greece. She received a B.A., M.A, and PhD in Communication and Media Studies from Free University of Berlin. She began her career in Germany, as a co-producer on the feature films White King, Red Queen (1993), directed by Sergei Bodrov and ID (1995), directed by Phil Davis; and as a producer on Love Lies (1997) and The Commissioner (1998). She co-wrote the latter film, which was directed by George Sluizer and starred John Hurt. This led to further work as a screenwriter. Kallas wrote on several series for German television, including Edel & Starck (2001-2003) and Danni Lowinski (2010-2013). She produced the feature film Mothers (2010), written and directed by Milcho Manchevski.

During this time, Kallas spent eight years as president of the Federation of Screenwriters in Europe (FSE). In 2007, under her aegis, the FSE released the European Screenwriters Manifesto, which asserted that “The screenwriter is an author of the film, a primary creator of the audiovisual work; the indiscriminate use of the possessory credit is unacceptable; and the moral rights of the screenwriter, especially the right to maintain the integrity of a work and to protect it from any distortion or misuse, should be inalienable and should be fully honored in practice.” As Kallas told the Los Angeles Times, “What we tried to do by naming it the ‘manifesto’ is to challenge the international film community and to start a discussion about what has gone wrong and how we could set it right.”

Relocating to New York City, Kallas began teaching at a number of universities and colleges, including Barnard College, Columbia University, The New School, and Brooklyn College. During this time, she also wrote two books: Creative Screenwriting: Understanding Emotional Structure, published by Red Globe Press in 2010; and Inside The Writers' Room: Conversations with American TV Writers, published by Palgrave Macmillan in 2013,.

== Directorial career ==
Kallas made her directorial debut with the feature film 42 Seconds of Happiness (2016). Writing in Eye For Film, critic Jennie Kermode called it “a film possessed of a rare emotional intelligence. It doesn't wrap everything up neatly but finds hope in the acceptance of loose ends. It's a brave piece of work, skilfully crafted and brimming over with talent, a fantastic calling card for all involved.”

Her next feature was The Rainbow Experiment (2018), which follows the events after a teenager dies during a high school chemistry experiment. The film premiered at the Slamdance Film Festival. Reviewing the film for Film Threat, Bill Arcineau praised Kallas's handling of the film's multiple storylines and ensemble cast, as well as its editing and transitions, and described her as "someone to watch".

In 2022, Kallas released Paris is in Harlem, set on the day in 2017 when the notorious New York City Cabaret Law was finally repealed. As Lisa Nystrom wrote in FilmInk, “Kallas weaves together a captivating narrative using a complex spiderweb of different viewpoints, the camera seamlessly switching focus as background characters become protagonists, stepping forward when the time comes for their story to be told … The film brings together a diverse cacophony of voices touched by racism, sexism, and oppression, finding a harmony through shared experience.”

All of Kallas' feature films to date have been developed through a specific method, not unlike the one used by UK director Mike Leigh. Kallas wrote in Filmmaker in 2017 that her approach “aims at merging the character with the actor … I workshop a screenplay as one would a play for the theater — only I walk the actors through the characters’ past, future and possible lives in weekly rehearsals. This allows me to shoot in fewer days and with smaller budgets, while at the same time delivering the emotional authenticity that people mention in relation to my films. In these 15 months I orchestrate the experience of each character in such a way that the tension rises constantly and continuously. When the characters are about to explode, I start shooting.”

== Filmography ==
Film

Year	Title	Director	Writer	Producer
1993	White King, Red Queen (co-producer)	No	No	Yes
1995	I.D. (co-producer)	No	No	Yes
1997	Love Lies	No	No	Yes
1998	The Commissioner	No	Yes	Yes
2010	Mothers	No	No	Yes
2016	42 Seconds of Happiness (also Executive Producer)	Yes	Yes	Yes
2018	The Rainbow Experiment	Yes	Yes	Yes
2022	Paris is in Harlem	Yes	Yes	Yes

Television

Year	Title	Notes
1999	Männer sind wie Schokolade (TV movie)	Co-writer
2002-2003	Edel & Starck	Two episodes
2005	Honey and the Pig (TV movie)	Co-writer
2010	Danni Lowinski	Three episodes

== Accolades ==
Year	Film	Award	Category	Result	Ref.
2016	42 Seconds of Happiness	Women Texas Film Festival	Best Feature Film Award	Won	
2017	42 Seconds of Happiness	Jaipur International Film Festival	Best Film From American Continent	Won	
2018	The Rainbow Experiment	Harlem International Film Festival	Audience Award	Won	
2022	Paris is in Harlem	Mystic Film Festival	Best Ensemble Cast	Won	
