= Goodbye Solo (film) =

- Film poster
- Directed by: Ramin Bahrani
- Written by: Bahareh Azimi; Ramin Bahrani
- Produced by: Jason Orans; Ramin Bahrani
- Starring: Souléymane Sy Savané; Red West
- Cinematography: Michael Simmonds
- Edited by: Ramin Bahrani
- Music by: M. Lo
- Production companies: Gigantic Pictures; Noruz Films; Lucky Hat Entertainment; ITVS
- Distributed by: Roadside Attractions
- Release dates: August 31, 2008 (Venice); March 27, 2009 (United States)
- Running time: 91 minutes
- Country: United States
- Language: English
- Box office: $826,763

Goodbye Solo is a 2008 American drama film written and directed by Ramin Bahrani. It premiered as an official selection of the 2008 Venice Film Festival where it won the international film critic's FIPRESCI award for best film, and later had its North American premiere at the 2008 Toronto International Film Festival. The film was distributed by Roadside Attractions. The film exhibits significant thematic and plot similarities to Abbas Kiarostami's 1997 film Taste of Cherry.

== Plot ==
Solo, a Senegalese cab driver, is working to provide a better life for his young family in Winston-Salem, North Carolina. William, an old man with a lifetime of regrets, hires Solo to take him to Blowing Rock, a peak in which updrafts cause objects that are dropped from it to fly upwards. William does not ask for a ride back from the rock and is obviously depressed, so Solo assumes that the old man intends to commit suicide there. Solo befriends William, in hopes of talking him out of ending his life. He introduces William to his wife and his stepdaughter Alex, hoping to inspire the old man with the joys of life. Solo takes William in his taxi to Blowing Rock, and returns without him.

== Cast ==
- Souléymane Sy Savané as Solo
- Red West as William
- Diana Franco Galindo as Alex

== Reception ==
On review aggregator Rotten Tomatoes, 94% of 108 critics gave the film a positive review. The site’s consensus reads, "An original and thoughtful human drama, Goodbye Solo looks at relationships and loneliness while proving director Ramin Bahrani's is an important American voice."

The film was hailed as "A force of nature" by critic Roger Ebert, who awarded it four out of four stars. The New York Times' A.O. Scott said it has "...an uncanny ability to enlarge your perception of the world."

== Awards ==
In 2008, Goodbye Solo won the Venice Film Festival’s FIPRESCI International Critics Prize. It was also named one of the Top Ten Independent Films of 2009 by the National Board of Review.

Souléymane Sy Savané was nominated for Best Male Lead for the 2010 Independent Spirit Awards.
