= David Cromer =

American actor & director (born 1964)

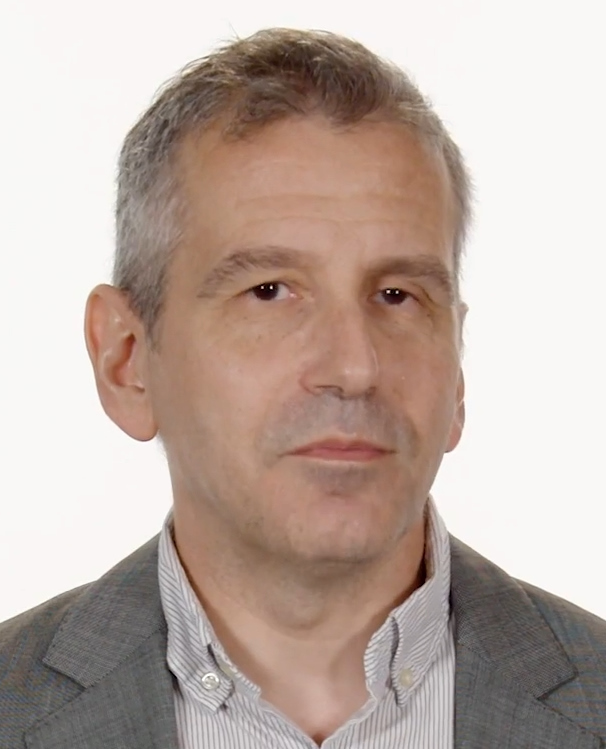
- Cromer in 2018
- Born: October 17, 1964 (age 62); United States
- Occupation: Theatrical director
- Awards: Lucille Lortel Award, Obie Award, Tony Award, MacArthur Fellow

David Cromer (born October 17, 1964) is an American theatre director, and stage, film, and TV actor. He has received recognition for his work on Broadway, Off-Broadway, and in his native Chicago. Cromer has won or been nominated for numerous awards, including winning the Lucille Lortel Award and Obie Award for his direction of Our Town. He was nominated for the Drama Desk Award and the Outer Critics Circle Award for his direction of The Adding Machine. In 2018, Cromer won the Tony Award for Best Direction of a Musical for The Band's Visit.

== Biography and education ==
Born the third of four sons to Richard and Louise Cromer, he was raised in Skokie, Illinois. Cromer dropped out of high school in his junior year, later acquired a GED, and attended Columbia College Chicago.

== Career ==
Cromer has been nominated for or won the Joseph Jefferson Award for his work in Chicago productions, winning for Angels in America Parts I and II in 1998, The Price in 2002, and The Cider House Rules in 2003. In 2005, Cromer made his Off-Broadway debut directing Austin Pendleton's Orson's Shadow at the Barrow Street Theatre. The production originated at the Steppenwolf Theatre Company in Chicago. His 2008 production of a musical adaptation of The Adding Machine also moved to Off-Broadway from Chicago and received wide critical acclaim, receiving six Lucille Lortel Award nominations in the 2008 season, more than any other show. Cromer received a nomination for the 2008 Drama Desk Award, Outstanding Director of a Musical, for The Adding Machine. It is now being produced in regional theaters around the country.

In 2009, Cromer performed the role of the Stage Manager in an Off-Broadway revival of Our Town, which he also directed, at The Barrow Street Theatre. The production, which began in Chicago in 2008, has been acclaimed for its non-traditional elements. Cromer won the Lucille Lortel Award for Outstanding Director and the Obie Award, Directing for Our Town. In the wake of his Our Town success, The New York Times profiled Cromer, referring to "his suddenly thriving career [which] has etched him as a visionary wunderkind, a genius in a black cape with secrets up his billowing sleeves."

In October 2009, Cromer directed a short-lived Broadway revival of Brighton Beach Memoirs starring Noah Robbins, Santino Fontana, Laurie Metcalf, and Dennis Boutsikaris. (The planned production of Broadway Bound was cancelled.) He directed the Broadway revival of The House of Blue Leaves, which starred Ben Stiller and Edie Falco and played a limited run from April 2011 to August 2011. In 2010, he was announced to direct the Broadway production of the musical Yank! by Joseph and David Zellnik. In 2010, he said of Yank!, "I'm hungrier to work on this than anything in recent memory." However, the production was postponed, according to The New York Times article of September 2010.

In June to July 2011, he directed A Streetcar Named Desire, with Jessica Hecht as Blanche, at the Williamstown Theater Festival. He was announced to direct a Broadway revival of Tennessee Williams' Sweet Bird of Youth starring Nicole Kidman and James Franco and set for Fall 2011, but in August 2011 the production was delayed and Franco dropped out. Cromer said it was "still on the drawing board." He directed the play in Chicago in 2012 with Diane Lane. He directed Tribes by Nina Raine at the Off-Broadway Barrow Street Theatre, which ran from February 2012 to September 2012.

Cromer also has worked as a character actor. In 2012, he appeared in a small role in the pilot of the television show The Newsroom. In 2015, he played a character in the show Billions.

In October to December 2013, he returned to Chicago to star as Ned Weeks in TimeLine Theatre Company's production of The Normal Heart by Larry Kramer. In 2016 he directed The Effect and The Band's Visit, the latter of which won him the 2017 Obie Award for Directing. In 2017, The Band's Visit transferred to Broadway, where it won 10 Tony Awards, including Best Musical and Best Direction of a Musical.

In 2017 he directed The Treasurer at Playwrights' Horizons. In 2019, he directed The Sound Inside at Studio 54 for which Cromer received a nomination for the Tony Award for Best Direction of a Play, one of the six Tony nominations the production received. In 2022, he directed Camp Siegfried at the Tony Kiser Theatre and A Case for the Existence of God Off-Broadway. In 2023, he appeared in the title role in Uncle Vanya Off-Broadway.

Cromer directed the Broadway production of the play Prayer for the French Republic by Joshua Harmon in 2024. In 2024, it was announced that Cromer was set to direct the stage adaptation of Good Night, and Good Luck co-written and starring George Clooney. Cromer directed the musical Dead Outlaw on Broadway in 2025.

== Personal life ==
He was named a 2010 MacArthur Fellows Program; the foundation cited his efforts in reviving classic theater such as his work on The Adding Machine and Our Town in their announcement.

He taught directing at Columbia College Chicago, the same school he attended years prior.

Cromer is gay.

== Stage credits ==
Year	Title	Role	Venue
1995	Oscar Remembered	Director	Regional, Writers Theatre
1996	Golden Boy	Director	Regional, Steppenwolf Theatre
1998	Angels in America	Louis Ironson	Also director; Regional, The Journeymen
1999	Translations	Director	Regional, Seanachi Theatre Company
2000	Orson's Shadow	Director	Regional, Steppenwolf Theatre
2000	Orson's Shadow	Director	Regional, Williamstown Theatre Festival
2000	Booth	Director	Regional, Writers Theatre
2001	Betty's Summer Vacation	Director	Regional, Roadworks Productions
2002	The Price	Director	Regional, Writers Theatre
2002	The Dazzle	Director	Regional, Steppenwolf Theatre
2002	The Hot l Baltimore	Director	Regional, Marry-Arrchie Theatre Company
2003	The Cider House Rules	Director	Regional, Famous Door Theater
2003	Journey's End	Director	Regional, Seanachi Theatre Company
2003	The Grapes of Wrath	Director	Regional, Ford's Theatre Company
2004	Blue/Orange	Director	Regional, Northlight Theatre
2004	Mojo	Director	Regional, Marry-Arrchie Theatre Company
2005	Orson's Shadow	Director	Regional, Marry-Arrchie Theatre Company
2006	Come Back, Little Sheba	Director	Regional, Shattered Globe Theatre
2007	The Adding Machine: A Chamber Musical	Director	Regional, Next Theatre Company
2008	Adding Machine	Director	Regional, Minetta Lane Theatre
2008	Our Town	Stage Manager	Also director; Regional, Chopin Studio Theatre
2008	Picnic	Director	Regional, Writers Theatre
2008	Celebrity Row	Director	Regional, American Theater Company
2009	Our Town	Stage Manager	Also director; Off-Broadway, Barrow Street Theatre
2009	The Farnsworth Invention	Director	Regional, Alley Theatre
2009	Brighton Beach Memoirs	Director	Broadway, Nederlander Theatre
2009	Broadway Bound	Director	Broadway, Nederlander Theatre
2009	The Santaland Diaries	Director	Regional, Alley Theatre
2010	When the Rain Stops Falling	Director	Off-Broadway, Lincoln Center Theatre
2010	A Streetcar Named Desire	Director	Regional, Writers Theatre
2010	Cherrywood: The Modern Comparable	Director	Regional, Marry-Arrchie Theatre Company
2011	The House of Blue Leaves	Director	Broadway, Walter Kerr Theatre
2011	A Streetcar Named Desire	Director	Regional, Williamstown Theatre Festival
2012	Tribes	Director	Off-Broadway, Barrow Street Theatre
2012	Rent	Director	Regional, American Theater Company
2012	Sweet Bird of Youth	Director	Regional, Goodman Theatre
2012	Our Town	Stage Manager	Also director; Regional, Huntington Theatre Company
2013	Really Really	Director	Off-Broadway, MCC Theater
2013	Nikolai and the Others	Director	Off-Broadway, Lincoln Center Theatre
2013	Tribes	Director	Regional, La Jolla Playhouse
2013	Women or Nothing	Director	Off-Broadway, Atlantic Theatre Company
2014	A Raisin in the Sun	Karl Lindner	Broadway, Ethel Barrymore Theatre
2014	Our Town	Stage Manager	Also director; Regional, Kansas City Repertory Theatre
2014	Our Town	Stage Manager	Also director; West End, Almeida Theatre
2015	Angels in America	Director	Regional, Kansas City Repertory Theatre
2015	Come Back, Little Sheba	Director	Regional, Huntington Theatre Company
2016	The Effect	Director	Off-Broadway, Barrow Street Theatre
2016	The Band's Visit	Director	Off-Broadway, Atlantic Theatre Company
2017	Man from Nebraska	Director	Off-Broadway, Second Stage Theatre
2017	The Treasurer	Director	Off-Broadway, Playwrights Horizons
2017	The Band's Visit	Director	Broadway, Ethel Barrymore Theatre
2018	The Sound Inside	Director	Regional, Williamstown Theatre Festival
2018	The Waverly Gallery	Howard Fine	Broadway, John Golden Theatre
2019	The Sound Inside	Director	Broadway, Studio 54
2019	Next to Normal	Director	Regional, Writers Theatre
2020	Bug	Director	Regional, Steppenwolf Theatre
2021	Bug	Director	Regional, Steppenwolf Theatre
2022	A Case for the Existence of God	Director	Off-Broadway, Signature Theatre Company
2022	Camp Siegfried	Director	Off-Broadway, Second Stage Theatre
2024	Prayer for the French Republic	Director	Broadway, Samuel J. Friedman Theatre
2024	Dead Outlaw	Director	Off-Broadway, Minetta Lane Theatre
2024	The Counter	Director	Off-Broadway, Roundabout Theatre Company
2024	I'm Almost There	Director	Off-Broadway, Minetta Lane Theatre
2025	The Antiquities	Director	Off-Broadway, Playwrights Horizons
2025	The Antiquities	Director	Regional, Goodman Theatre
2025	Good Night, and Good Luck	Director	Broadway, Winter Garden Theatre
2025	Dead Outlaw	Director	Broadway, Longacre Theatre
2025	Caroline	Director	Off-Broadway, MCC Theater
2025	Meet the Cartozians	Director	Off-Broadway, Second Stage Theatre
2026	Bug	Director	Broadway, Samuel Friedman Theatre
2026	The Fear of 13	Director	Broadway, James Earl Jones Theatre

== Awards and nominations ==
Year	Award	Category	Work	Result	Ref.
2008	Drama Desk Awards	Outstanding Director of a Musical	Adding Machine	Nominated	
2008	Outer Critics Circle Awards	Outstanding Director of a Musical	Adding Machine	Nominated	
2012	Drama Desk Awards	Outstanding Director of a Play	Tribes	Nominated	
2012	Outer Critics Circle Awards	Outstanding Director of a Play	Tribes	Nominated	
2017	Drama Desk Awards	Outstanding Director of a Musical	The Band's Visit	Won	
2017	Outer Critics Circle Awards	Outstanding Director of a Musical	The Band's Visit	Nominated	
2018	Tony Awards	Best Direction of a Musical	The Band's Visit	Won	
2018	Drama League Awards	Outstanding Production of a Broadway or Off-Broadway Musical	The Band's Visit	Won	
2020	Tony Awards	Best Direction of a Play	The Sound Inside	Nominated	
2022	Lucille Lortel Awards	Outstanding Director	Prayer for the French Republic	Nominated	
2023	Lucille Lortel Awards	Outstanding Director	A Case for the Existence of God	Nominated	
2024	Lucille Lortel Awards	Outstanding Director	Dead Outlaw	Nominated	
2024	Drama League Awards	Outstanding Direction of a Musical	Dead Outlaw	Nominated	
2024	Drama Desk Awards	Outstanding Direction of a Musical	Dead Outlaw	Nominated	
2025	Tony Awards	Best Direction of a Musical	Dead Outlaw	Nominated	
2025	Drama League Awards	Outstanding Direction of a Play	Good Night, and Good Luck	Nominated	
2025	Drama Desk Awards	Outstanding Director of a Play	The Antiquities	Nominated	
2026	Drama League Award	Founders Award for Excellence in Directing		Honored	
