= Arranged (film) =

- DVD cover
- Directed by: Diane Crespo; Stefan Schaefer
- Written by: Stefan Schaefer; Yuta Silverman
- Produced by: Diane Crespo; Stefan Schaefer
- Starring: Zoe Lister-Jones; Francis Benhamou
- Cinematography: Dan Hersey
- Edited by: Erin Greenwall
- Music by: Sohrab Habibion; Michael Hampton
- Distributed by: Cicala Filmworks
- Release date: March 11, 2007
- Running time: 90 minutes
- Country: United States
- Languages: English; Hebrew; Arabic

Arranged is a 2007 American independent buddy film, produced by Cicala Filmworks, directed by Diane Crespo and Stefan Schaefer, and starring Zoe Lister-Jones and Francis Benhamou. It tells the story of the friendship between an Orthodox Jewish woman (Rochel) and a Muslim woman (Nasira), both of whom are teachers in New York City.

== Plot ==
Rochel, an Orthodox Jew, and Nasira, a Muslim originally from Syria, are young women who are just beginning as teachers in New York's public school system. As Rochel is a teacher for the visually impaired, she meets Nasira, who teaches the fourth grade, as the aid for Eddie, one of Nasira's students. They bond while working together on Eddie's assignments, realizing that they share a lot in common. They also both fight against the stereotypes directed towards them, particularly from Principal Jacoby and Rochel's family.

Both Nasira and Rochel are going through the process of an arranged marriage. Nasira is initially introduced to an older man, a friend of her father’s, whom she rejects. Her parents then introduce her to a young man her own age whom she likes. The system is different for Rochel, however, who is introduced to young men through the local Shadchan. While Nasira's parents ultimately listened to her frustrations and interests, Rochel's Shadchan only introduces Rochel to young men who fit the Shadchan's set of expectations, while ignoring what Rochel wants. After a few disastrous introductions, Rochel announces that she is stopping the process. She then temporarily leaves home to discuss the matter with her cousin, who has left the Orthodox tradition.

Ultimately, through an accidental meeting with friends of her brother, including an Orthodox Jewish young man, it is Nasira who helps Rochel find someone she likes. The film ends with Nasira and Rochel both married, sitting in the park with their babies in their strollers, talking about their husbands and married life.

== Cast ==
- Zoe Lister-Jones as Rochel Meshenberg
- Francis Benhamou as Nasira Khaldi
- Mimi Lieber as Sheli Meshenberg
- John Rothman as Matan Meshenberg
- Sarah Lord as Naomi Meshenberg
- Trevor Braun as Avi Meshenberg
- Doris Belack as Elona
- Laith Nakli as Abdul-Halim Khaldi
- Jason Liebman as Gideon
- Marcia Jean Kurtz as Principal Jacoby
- Peggy Gormley as Miriam
- David Castro as Eddie
- Sanjit De Silva as Jamil
- Daniel London as Elliot
- Arian Moayed as Ahmed Khaldi
- Alysia Reiner as Leah
- Patricia Crespo as Woman with Child
- Nicholas Crespo as Schoolboy

== Release ==
=== Accolades ===
Arranged was the winner of Best Feature Film at the Brooklyn Film Festival and won the Audience Award at the Washington Jewish Film Festival.

== Reception ==
On the review aggregator website Rotten Tomatoes, 64% of 14 critics' reviews are positive, with an average rating of 6.3/10.
