= Prayer for the French Republic =

2022 play

- Written by: Joshua Harmon
- Original language: English
- Subject: Generational trauma
- Genre: Drama

Premiere
- Date premiered: 2022
- Place premiered: Manhattan Theatre Club

Prayer for the French Republic is a 2022 dramatic stage play by American playwright Joshua Harmon. It centers on a Jewish family living in France as they struggle with their identity due to rising tensions from antisemitic attacks. The play won the 2022 Drama Desk Award for Outstanding Play.

== Plot ==
In 2016, an American student Molly decides to visit her family in France to find her roots and tries to connect with her distant cousin Marcelle. Marcelle's son is the victim of an anti-Semitic attack, causing Marcelle's husband Charles who immigrated from Algeria to decide to move to Israel. This earns the dismay of Marcelle's brother Patrick, as Marine Le Pen's rise in mainstream French politics continues. The play's second story explores how Marcelle and Patrick's great-grandparents suffered loss during the Holocaust in the 1940s.

== Cast ==
Character	Off-Broadway	Broadway
Character	2022	2024
2016–2017
Marcelle Salomon Benhamou	Betsy Aidem	Betsy Aidem
Charles Benhamou	Jeff Seymour	Nael Nacer
Elodie Benhamou	Francis Benhamou	Francis Benhamou
Daniel Benhamou	Yair Ben-Dor	Aria Shahghasemi
Patrick Salomon	Richard Topol	Anthony Edwards
Molly	Molly Ranson	Molly Ranson
Pierre Salomon	Pierre Epstein	Richard Masur
1944–1946
Irma Salomon	Nancy Robinette	Nancy Robinette
Adolphe Salomon	Kenneth Tigar	Daniel Oreskes
Lucien Salomon	Ari Brand	Ari Brand
Young Pierre Salomon	Peyton Lusk	Ethan Haberfield

== Production history ==
The first production premiered at the Manhattan Theatre Club in New York City on January 11, 2022, and extended for two weeks. The cast featured Betsy Aidem, Yair Ben-Dor, Francis Benhamou, Ari Brand, Pierre Epstein, Peyton Lusk, Molly Ranson, Nancy Robinette, Jeff Seymour, Kenneth Tigar, and Richard Topol.

The Broadway production began previews on December 19, 2023 and officially opened on January 9, 2024. It starred much of the off-Broadway cast alongside Anthony Edwards as Patrick. The Off-Broadway and Broadway productions were directed by David Cromer.

== Awards and nominations ==
=== 2022 Off-Broadway production ===
Year	Award	Category	Nominee	Result
2022	Lucille Lortel Awards	Outstanding Play		Nominated
2022	Lucille Lortel Awards	Outstanding Director	David Cromer	Nominated
2022	Lucille Lortel Awards	Outstanding Featured Performer in a Play	Betsy Aidem	Nominated
2022	Lucille Lortel Awards	Outstanding Featured Performer in a Play	Francis Benhamou	Won
2022	Drama League Awards	Outstanding Production of a Play		Nominated
2022	Outer Critics Circle Awards	Outstanding New Off-Broadway Play		Won
2022	Outer Critics Circle Awards	Outstanding Actress in a Play	Betsy Aidem	Nominated
2022	Outer Critics Circle Awards	Outstanding Featured Actress in a Play	Francis Benhamou	Nominated
2022	Outer Critics Circle Awards	Outstanding Featured Actress in a Play	Nancy Robinette	Nominated
2022	Drama Desk Awards	Outstanding Play		Won
2022	Drama Desk Awards	Outstanding Featured Actress in a Play	Francis Benhamou	Won
2022	Drama Desk Awards	Outstanding Lighting Design for a Play	Amith Chandrashaker	Won
2022	Artios Awards	New York Theatre - Comedy or Drama	Kelly Gillespie	Nominated
2022	Off Broadway Alliance Awards	Outstanding New Play		Nominated
2022	Theatre World Awards	Outstanding Broadway or Off-Broadway Debut Performance	Yair Ben-Dor	Honoree

=== 2024 Broadway production ===
Year	Award	Category	Nominee	Result
2024	Drama League Awards	Outstanding Production of a Play		Nominated
2024	Drama League Awards	Distinguished Performance	Betsy Aidem	Nominated
2024	Tony Awards	Best Play		Nominated
2024	Tony Awards	Best Actress in a Play	Betsy Aidem	Nominated
2024	Tony Awards	Best Lighting Design in a Play	Amith Chandrashaker	Nominated
