= Adding Machine (musical) =

- World Premiere Recording
- Music: Joshua Schmidt
- Lyrics: Jason Loewith; Joshua Schmidt
- Book: Jason Loewith; Joshua Schmidt
- Basis: Play The Adding Machine by Elmer Rice
- Productions: 2007 Illinois; 2008 Off-Broadway; 2009 Washington D.C. 2010 Boston; 2011 Los Angeles; 2011 Vancouver (Canadian Premiere)

Adding Machine is a musical with music by Joshua Schmidt, and book and lyrics by Schmidt and Jason Loewith. It is an adaptation of Elmer Rice's 1923 play of the same name.

The show opened in 2007 in Illinois before moving off-Broadway in 2008. The show was nominated for numerous Lucille Lortel and Drama Desk awards.

== Background ==
Adding Machine is a musical adaptation of Elmer Rice's 1923 play The Adding Machine. The original play has been called the "gimlet-eyed Expressionist classic about the soul rot of conventionality;" it relates the story of an "antihero," Mr. Zero, who murders his boss after he has been replaced by an adding machine after 25 years on the job. Loewith conceived a musical adaptation after learning of the Kurt Weill musical based on a second Rice play Street Scene. After some years, Loewith was able to attract composer Joshua Schmidt to the project; Schmidt composed the music, and wrote the libretto and book together with Loewith. Schmidt met Loewith because he was the artistic director of company at Next Theater. Schmidt explained why his show had such a small band: "At Next Theater, we had a 15-by-5 space for the orchestra — a shoebox with a very low ceiling. My experience had taught me how to get a lot out of a little. I approached it with this combination in mind from the moment of conception. I didn’t cut it back to make it fit our space. I created a full blown, challenging score for three instruments. It’s not a matter of compensating for instruments that aren’t there."

== Productions ==
The musical premiered in 2007 at the Next Theater in Illinois in a production directed by David Cromer and starring Joel Hatch, Cyrilla Baer, and Amy Warren. The Chicago production was recognized with a Jeff Award for Best Musical.

It opened Off Broadway at the Minetta Lane Theatre on February 25, 2008; it was again directed by David Cromer, with many of the original cast members. The New York-based critic Adam Feldman reviewed the musical enthusiastically, noting that "Schmidt and Loewith’s adaptation cleaves to the bones of Rice’s play but also fleshes it out in a superbly varied score" and "Adding Machine does what Zero literally cannot imagine: It alchemizes mediocrity into excellence." The production received six Lucille Lortel Award nominations, more than any other show in the 2008 season, and won for Outstanding Musical (among others).

The show was produced in Washington, DC in 2009 at The Studio Theatre with Jason Loewith directing. It then was produced by the SpeakEasy Stage Company in Boston in March and April 2010, at the Calderwood Pavilion at the Boston Center for the Arts. Cincinnati's Know Theatre produced it in their 2009–2010 season. In Los Angeles, it was produced by the Odyssey Theater Ensemble in early 2011. The production was directed by Ron Sossi; Clifford Morts and Kelly Lester played Mr. and Mrs. Zero. In Milwaukee, it was produced by the Skylight Music Theatre in 2011.

A new production was staged as the Australasian Premiere by Underground Productions based in Brisbane, Queensland, Australia. The production was staged for a limited season at the Schonell Theatre at the University of Queensland, St Lucia campus. The production opened in September 2014 for a 3-week season. The cast featured Chris Kellett as Mr. Zero, Gabriella Flowers (Mrs Zero) and Taylor Davidson (Daisy Devore), with Music Direction by Benedict Braxton-Smith.

== Song list ==
Listing based on the compilation at CastAlbum.com.

- Prelude
- Something to Be Proud Of
- Harmony, Not Discord
- Office Reverie
- Moving Up
- In Numbers
- In Numbers (Reprise)
- I'd Rather Watch You
- The Party
- Zero's Confession
- Ham and Eggs
- Didn't We?
- I Was A Fool
- The Gospel According to Shrdlu
- Death March
- A Pleasant Place
- Shrdlu's Blues
- Daisy's Confession
- I'd Rather Watch You (Reprise)
- Freedom!
- Freedom! (Reprise)
- The Music of the Machine

== Cast (New York) ==
- Cyrilla Baer as Mrs Zero
- Joel Hatch as Mr Zero
- Amy Warren as Daisy Devore
- Joe Farrell as Shrdlu
- Jeff Still as Boss/Fixer/Charles
- Adinah Alexander as Mrs Two
- Niffer Clarke as Mrs One
- Roger E. DeWitt as Mr Two
- Daniel Marcus as Mr One
- Swings: Randy Blair and Ariela Morgenstern

== Awards and nominations ==
2008 Lucille Lortel Awards

- Outstanding Musical (winner)
- Outstanding Director, David Cromer (winner)
- Outstanding Lead Actor, Joel Hatch (winner)
- Outstanding Featured Actress, Amy Warren
- Outstanding Costume Design, Kristine Knanishu
- Outstanding Lighting Design, Keith Parham (winner)

Drama Desk Awards (nominations)

- Outstanding Musical
- Outstanding Featured Actress in a Musical, Amy Warren
- Outstanding Director of a Musical
- Outstanding Music (Schmidt)
- Outstanding Lyrics (Loewith and Schmidt)
- Outstanding Book of a Musical
- Outstanding Set Design of a Musical (Takeshi Kata)
- Outstanding Lighting Design (Keith Parham)
- Outstanding Sound Design (Tony Smolenski IV)

Outer Critics Circle Awards

- Outstanding New Off-Broadway Musical (winner)
- Outstanding New Score (winner)
- Outstanding Director Of A Musical (nominee)
- Outstanding Featured Actress In A Musical (Amy Warren) (nominee)

New York Drama Critics' Circle Awards

- Best Musical (runner-up)
