= Steel Magnolias (play) =

1987 play by Robert Harling

- Original language: English
- Written by: Robert Harling
- Characters: Shelby; M'Lynn; Ouiser; Clairee; Truvy; Annelle
- Genre: Tragicomedy
- Setting: Truvy's Beauty Spot, Northwest Louisiana, Chinquapin Parish

Premiere
- Date: 1987
- Place: WPA Theatre; New York City

Steel Magnolias is a 1987 stage play by American writer Robert Harling, based on his experience with his sister's death. The play is a tragicomedy about the bond among a group of Southern women in northwest Louisiana.

The title suggests the "female characters are as delicate as magnolias but as tough as steel". The magnolia specifically references a magnolia tree they are arguing about at the beginning.

== Synopsis ==
The entire play takes place in the late 1980s, at Truvy's in-home beauty parlor in the fictional northwestern Louisiana parish of Chinquapin, where a group of women regularly gather.

Act 1, Scene 1

Truvy Jones hires a young new stylist, Annelle Dupuy, who won't talk much about herself. Truvy and Annelle do the hair of Shelby Eatenton, a young nurse who is to be married that day, and her mother, M'Lynn Eatenton, a mental health counselor. They are joined by Clairee Belcher, the widow of the town's former mayor, and local grouch Ouiser Boudreaux. Shelby and M'Lynn bicker over the wedding preparations. Shelby, who has Type 1 diabetes, talks of how disappointed she is that she should not have children due to her health, and that she and her husband, Jackson, plan to adopt. Ouiser rails against M'Lynn's husband, Drum, and their disputes over their property line. Annelle breaks down and admits that her common law husband has abandoned her, taking most of her possessions. Truvy offers to rent out her garage apartment, as her twin sons will soon be leaving home.

Act 1, Scene 2

It's Christmastime, and Shelby returns home for a visit. She informs M'Lynn that she is pregnant. M'Lynn can't bring herself to be joyful as she knows a pregnancy could be devastating to Shelby's health. She accuses Shelby of ignoring her doctor's advice and Jackson of caring more about having a son than his wife's well-being. Shelby insists everything will be fine. Meanwhile, Clairee has purchased the local radio station; Annelle, after a brief period as a party girl, has started attending church and making gaudy arts and crafts; and Shelby attempts to set Ouiser up with Owen Jenkins, an old flame.

Act 2, Scene 1

Shelby's son, Jackson Jr., was born three months premature, but is thriving. Clairee relates how her brother has become estranged from her nephew after he came out as gay. Ouiser is seeing Owen, but insists that they are only friends. Annelle has become a fundamentalist Christian, much to the consternation of her new boyfriend, Sammy DeSoto. Shelby and M'Lynn, to the horror of the other ladies, relate how the stress of pregnancy has caused Shelby's kidneys to shut down and she is now on dialysis. M'Lynn will be donating a kidney to her daughter the next day.

Act 2, Scene 2

The organ transplant failed and Shelby fell into a coma during reparative surgery. M'Lynn relates how they were forced to disconnect Shelby's life support, and how Jackson and Drum couldn't stand to be in the room as she passed, even though 'men are supposed to be made of steel.' M'Lynn becomes furious at Annelle’s religious explanation. She breaks down screaming and crying for her daughter, wishing she had something to hit. Clairee grabs Ouiser, instructing M'Lynn to 'slap her!' This causes everyone to start laughing and breaks the tension. Annelle, who is pregnant, asks permission to name her child Shelby.

== Historical casting ==
Character	1987 WPA Theatre cast	1987 Lortel Theatre cast	1st National Tour cast	1989 West End cast	1989 film cast	2005 Broadway cast	2012 television film cast
Shelby Eatenton-Latcherie	Blanche Baker	Betsy Aidem	Tracy Shaffer	Joely Richardson	Julia Roberts	Rebecca Gayheart	Condola Rashad
M'Lynn Eatenton	Rosemary Prinz	Rosemary Prinz	Barbara Rush	Rosemary Harris	Sally Field	Christine Ebersole	Queen Latifah
Ouiser Boudreaux	Mary Fogarty	Mary Fogarty	Carole Cook	Jean Boht	Shirley MacLaine	Marsha Mason	Alfre Woodard
Clairee Belcher	Kate Wilkinson	Kate Wilkinson	June Lockhart	Stephanie Cole	Olympia Dukakis	Frances Sternhagen	Phylicia Rashad
Truvy Jones	Margo Martindale	Margo Martindale	Margo Martindale	Maggie Steed	Dolly Parton	Delta Burke	Jill Scott
Annelle Dupuy-DeSoto	Constance Shulman	Constance Shulman	Dawn Hopper	Janine Duvitski	Daryl Hannah	Lily Rabe	Adepero Oduye

== Background ==
The play is based on the family experience of the death of author Robert Harling's sister, Susan Harling-Robinson, in 1985 from diabetic complications after the birth of his namesake nephew and the failure of a family-member-donated kidney. Following the death, a writer friend advised him to write it down to come to terms with the experience. He did but originally as a short story to give his nephew an understanding of the child's deceased mother. It evolved in ten days to a play performed Off-Broadway before being adapted into Steel Magnolias (1989).

Harling, maybe based on his short, dry experience in the field of law ("not many laughs in Brown v. Board of Education"), felt it important to include the way the characters used humor and lighthearted conversations to cope with the seriousness of the underlying situations. Harling wanted the audience to have a true representation of what his family endured.

== Production history ==
=== US productions ===
The play originally opened Off-Broadway (with one set and an all-female cast although the voice of a male DJ on the radio is intermittent during the play with all male "characters" referenced only through dialogue) at the WPA Theatre, in New York City, on March 28, 1987, with Pamela Berlin as director.

The production transferred to the Lucille Lortel Theatre on June 19, 1987, and closed on February 25, 1990 after 1,126 performances. Replacements during the original Off-Broadway run included Anne Pitoniak, Bette Henritze, Rita Gardner, Maeve McGuire, and Stacy Ray.

A U.S. national tour was launched in 1989. Marion Ross joined the tour as Clairee late in the run.

The play made its Broadway debut in 2005 and opened at the Lyceum Theatre, in previews starting on March 15, and officially opened April 4, and closed on July 31, 2005, after 23 previews and 136 performances, directed by Jason Moore.

=== UK productions ===
The premiere UK production opened in the West End in March 1989 at the Lyric Theatre, directed by Julia McKenzie.

It returned to the West End for a limited engagement at the Westminster Theatre March 30-April 9, 1990, in a production mounted by Rose Bruford College.

A tour of the show opened at the Theatre Royal Bath on April 2, 2012, and was scheduled to play at ten theatres including the Richmond Theatre in London during an eleven-week run. It was directed by David Gilmore.

=== International productions ===
Australia: Nicole Kidman made her professional stage debut in the first Australian production as Shelby. The show opened 18 May 1988 in the York Theatre at Sydney's Seymour Centre and went on to play Melbourne's Athenaeum Theatre. The cast also included Nancye Hayes, Maggie Dence, Melissa Jaffer, Genevieve Lemon, Pat McDonald, and Peter Snook.

In late 2023, the Malanda Theatre Company in Far North Queensland ran the show with huge success, with Marky Baker directing and Felicity Huston producing, and again in August 2024 with Marky Baker directing again and Chris Davey Producing. It featured: M'Lynn Eatenton - Jean Thomas, Shelby Eatenton - Buckley Watson, Truvy Jones - Nicola Salisbury-Faulkner, Annelle Dupuy Desoto - Kaitlen Adams, Clairee Belcher - Jennifer Musetti, Ouiser Boudreaux - Louisa Crossle.

In 2026, a production toured Australia featuring Lisa McCune, Mandy Bishop, Belinda Giblin, Debra Lawrence, Jessica Redmayne and Lotte Beckett.

Ireland: Staged at the Gaiety Theatre, Dublin on September 11–22, 2012, directed by Ben Barnes, and on country-wide tour until October 19 the same year. The cast included Mischa Barton and Anne Charleston.

France: Coiffure et Confidences, the French-language adaptation by Didier Caron directed by Dominique Guillo, premiered in Paris at the Théâtre Michel in October 2014. After three successful runs in Paris and multiple nationwide tours, its final performance, attended by Robert Harling, was filmed on June 12, 2017 and released on the French channel C8 a few months later.

Cast:

- Thérèse (Truvy) - Marie-Hélène Lentini / Isabelle Ferron
- Jeanne (M'Lynn) - Astrid Veillon / Élisabeth Vitali / Anne Richard
- Magalie (Shelby) - Léa François
- Agnès (Annelle) - Sandrine Le Berre
- Claire (Clairee) - Isabelle Tanakil / Isabelle Ferron / Élisabeth Buffet
- Odette (Ouiser) - Brigitte Faure

Japan: Staged by the Haiyuza Theatre Company on November 14–25, 2007, in Tokyo, translated and directed by Hajime Mori. Cast: Mayuko Aoyama as Truvy, Kaoru Inoue as Annelle, Mayumi Katayam as Clairee, Midori Ando as Shelby, Atsuko Kawaguchi as M'Lynn and Minae as Ouiser.

Poland: It premiered at the Aleksandra Wegierki Dramatic Theatre in Białystok on April 14, 1992. Jean Korf was the director and the play was translated by Catherine Peebles and Andrzej Jakimiec. It was organized with help from the Embassy of the United States, Warsaw, especially the Cultural Attache, Bruce Byers.

On March 29, 2017, the U.S. Embassy Warsaw held two English-language staged readings at Teatr Polski Arnold Szyfman Theatre in Warsaw as the capstone to its Women's History Month Programming. The production was directed by Deputy Press Attache Stephen E. Dreikorn and featured an all-embassy employee cast consisting of both American and Polish employees. Polish director and actor Andrzej Seweryn spoke before one of the performances and called the Embassy's production a "great initiative".

Sweden: Premiered on November 16, 2008 at Vasateatern in Stockholm (with Robert Harling in attendance) titled "Blommor av Stål", it was directed by Emma Bucht and translated by Klas Östergren and Edward af Sillén. The cast: Cecilia Nilsson as Truvy, Pernilla August as M'Lynn, Melinda Kinnaman as Shelby, Suzanne Reuter as Ouiser, Linda Ulvaeus as Annelle and Gunilla Nyroos as Clairee.

== Screen adaptations ==
=== Film ===
The play was adapted as a film in 1988 and released in 1989, with a screenplay also by Harling and directed by Herbert Ross. The film was able to expand the story of the play with additional background stories and characters. Julia Roberts was nominated for the Academy Award for Best Supporting Actress for her performance as Shelby.

=== Television ===
CBS-TV produced the two-hour Steel Magnolias sitcom pilot in April 1990 in Robert Harling's childhood hometown of Natchitoches, Louisiana. Harling was screenwriter with his script being a continuation of the play and 1989 film following the death of Shelby. Thomas Schlamme directed and cast included: Cindy Williams as M’Lynn, Sally Kirkland as Truvy, Elaine Stritch as Ouiser, Polly Bergen as Clairee, and Sheila McCarthy as Annelle. Ultimately, CBS passed on the series giving the pilot a single airing on August 17, 1990.

=== 2012 television film ===
The play was adapted as a television film in 2012 with an African-American cast for a Lifetime TV production filmed in Atlanta, April 2012 (aired October 2012): directed by Kenny Leon and scripted by Sally Robinson.

- Cast: Queen Latifah as M'Lynn, Jill Scott as Truvy, Alfre Woodard as Ouiser, Phylicia Rashad as Clairee, Adepero Oduye as Annelle, and Condola Rashad as Shelby.
