= The Commissioner (film) =

1998 film

- Directed by: George Sluizer
- Written by: Stanley Johnson (novel); Christina Kallas; George Sluizer
- Produced by: Luciano Gloor; Christina Kallas
- Starring: John Hurt
- Music by: Loek Dikker
- Release date: 22 February 1998
- Running time: 108 minutes
- Countries: Belgium; France; Germany
- Language: English

The Commissioner is a 1998 internationally co-produced drama film directed by George Sluizer and written by Christina Kallas based on the novel of same name by Stanley Johnson. It was entered into the 48th Berlin International Film Festival.

== Cast ==
- John Hurt as James Morton
- Rosana Pastor as Helena Moguentes
- Alice Krige as Isabelle Morton
- Armin Mueller-Stahl as Hans Koenig
- Johan Leysen as Horst Kramer
- Simon Chandler as Peter Simpson
- David Morrissey as Murray Lomax
- James Faulkner as Gordon Cartwright
- Alan MacNaughtan as Karl Ritter
- Bill Bolender as Arthur Groom
- Julian Wadham as Prime Minister

== Release ==
In Australia, the film was released onto DVD by Payless Entertainment as a double feature together with Tender Loving Care also starring John Hurt.
