= Pamela Berlin =

American theatre director

Pamela Berlin (born 1952) is an American theatre director.

A native of Newport News, Virginia, Berlin planned to pursue a medical career, and attended Radcliffe College with that goal in mind, but she soon transferred her interest to the arts. She gained her MFA in directing from Southern Methodist University in 1977 and moved to New York City two years later, where she took work as a stage manager before joining the Ensemble Studio Theatre, of which organization she eventually became literary manager. She directed numerous plays for the company, beginning with The Self-Begotten in 1982; most notable among these was Steel Magnolias. On Broadway, she directed The Cemetery Club in 1990; she has continued to work off-Broadway. From 2001 until 2007 she was president of the Society of Stage Directors and Choreographers. Berlin continues to be active directing many regional theatrical productions. She has taught directing at the Mason Gross School of the Arts and acting at Brooklyn College, and has directed productions at the Juilliard School and the New York University Graduate Acting Program. She has also directed opera, working with such companies as the Vancouver Opera, Utah Opera, Lyric Opera of Kansas City, and Opera Omaha. She remains based in New York.
