= Francis Benhamou =

American actress

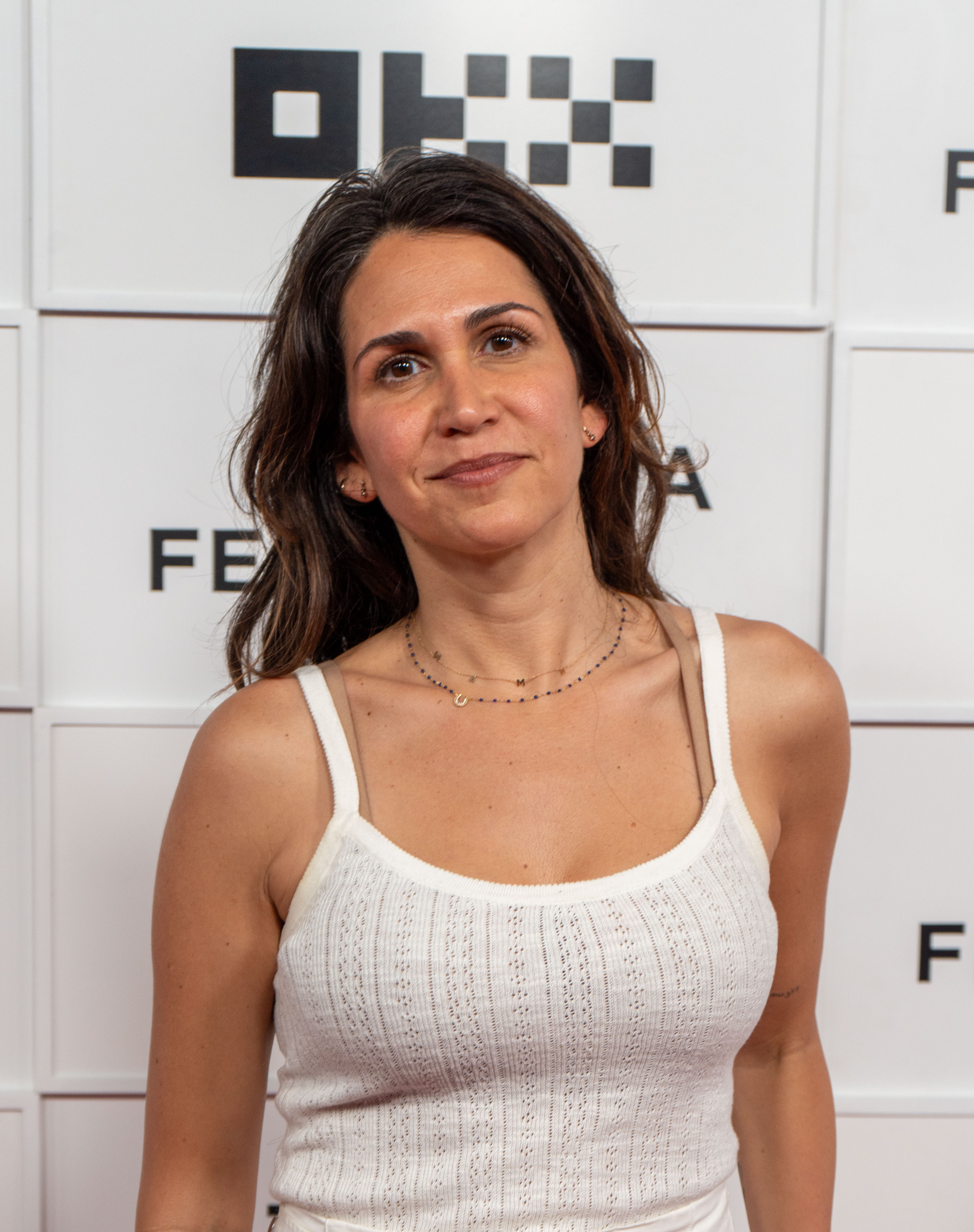
- Benhamou in 2026
- Born: Montevideo, Uruguay
- Occupation: Actress
- Years active: 2002–present
- Spouse: Kevin Kane (m. 2017)

Francis Benhamou is an American actress. She received Lucille Lortel Award and Drama Desk Award for Outstanding Featured Actress in a Play for her performance in the 2022 off-Broadway play Prayer for the French Republic.

== Life and career ==
Benhamou was born in Montevideo, Uruguay, and grew up in Miami. From her mother's side, she is Ashkenazi, Polish and Russian, and from her father's side is North African Sephardi. She graduated from the New York University. She began her career starring in short films and had minor role in the 2004 drama film, Imaginary Heroes. In 2007, Benhamou played the leading role alongside Zoe Lister-Jones in the independent drama film, Arranged. She later appeared in films Neal Cassady (2007), Breaking Upwards (2009), My Last Day Without You (2011), Big Words (2013), Listen Up Philip (2014), Women Who Kill (2016), and The Rainbow Experiment (2018). On television, Benhamou made guest starring appearances on Inside Amy Schumer, Daredevil and Life & Beth.

Benhamou has appeared in a number of stage productions, including notable off-Broadway productions Selling Kabul, The Profane, Invasion!; I Call My Brothers, and Motel Cherry. She starred in the 2022 off-Broadway production of Prayer for the French Republic, for which she received Lucille Lortel Award and Drama Desk Award for Outstanding Featured Actress in a Play and Outer Critics Circle Award nomination. She reprised her role in the 2024 Broadway production. She later was cast in the Netflix comedy film Kinda Pregnant and the drama series Black Rabbit.

== Filmography ==
=== Film ===
Year	Title	Role	Notes
2002	Hope Springs Eternal	Rosie	Short film
2004	Imaginary Heroes	Monica	Uncredited
2006	Lucia	Lucia	Short film
2007	Arranged	Nasira Khaldi	
2007	Singularity	Girl at Pool Hall	
2007	Neal Cassady	Rita	
2009	Breaking Upwards	Lindsay	
2011	My Last Day Without You	Joelle	
2011	I'm Not Me	Sam Benoit	
2013	Big Words	Sam	
2014	Listen Up Philip	Woman at Reception	
2016	Women Who Kill	Candice	
2017	Snatched	Colombian Army Commander	Uncredited
2018	Uncle Silas	Friend	Short film
2018	The Rainbow Experiment	Anna Guerrero	
2025	Kinda Pregnant	Jane	
2026	The Last Day	Dr. Haddad	

=== Television ===
Year	Title	Role	Notes
2007	The Bronx Is Burning	Judy Placido	Episode: "Time for a Change?"
2016–2022	Inside Amy Schumer	Various	3 episodes
2018	Daredevil	Andrea Morales	Episode: "Upstairs/Downstairs"
2022	Life & Beth		Episode: "Leonard"
2023	Dear Edward	Besa	Episode: "Food"
2025	Black Rabbit	Lisa Klein	2 episodes
