= Molly Ranson =

American actress and singer

Molly Ranson is an American actress and singer. She was born in New York City.

== Stage career ==
Ranson made her Broadway debut in the Tony Award-winning production of August: Osage County in 2007. She joined the cast of Jerusalem on Broadway in 2011, as Pea. The show started in 2009 at the Royal Court Theatre in London and moved to the Apollo Theatre in the West End in 2010, and starred Mark Rylance both in the UK and on Broadway.

She originated the role of Melody in the play Bad Jews in 2013.

Ranson took part as Carrie White in the 2009 reading of the revival of the musical Carrie, alongside Sutton Foster and Marin Mazzie. The hope was to make the show ready for Broadway, after its flop in 1988, when it closed after only 5 performances. After the new reading the show finally opened Off Broadway at the Lucille Lortel Theatre in 2010.

In 2015 Ranson was cast as Natalie Drexel in the comedy Fish in the Dark, with Larry David playing Norman Drexel. When the show was extended, the role was taken over for six weeks by Jason Alexander.

In 2022 Ranson starred as the character Molly in Prayer for the French Republic, while rehearsing for Plaza Suite, which opened right after the first closed. She was asked to take part in Prayer back when in grad school by playwright Joshua Harmon, who had just started writing the play at the time. The show is a family drama, presenting various aspects of the life of the Jewish Benhamous in contemporary Paris (2016-2017) as well as the earlier generation of the Salomons, using the same apartment space during WWII. Ranson reprised this role when MTC mounted the play again in 2024 on Broadway.

== Theatre ==
Year	Title	Role	Theatre
2007	August: Osage County	Jean Fordham (understudy and replacement)	Imperial Theater
2010	The Burnt Part Boys	Frances Boggs	Playwrights Horizons
2011	Jerusalem	Pea	Music Box Theatre
2009–2012	Carrie	Carrie White	Lucille Lortel Theatre
2012–2013	Bad Jews	Melody	Roundabout Theatre
2015	Fish in the Dark	Natalie Drexel	Cort Theatre
2017	Linda	Bridget	Manhattan Theatre Club
2020	Plaza Suite	Jean McCormick and Mimsey Hubley	Colonial Theatre
2022	Prayer for the French Republic	Molly	Manhattan Theatre Club
2022	Plaza Suite	Jean McCormick and Mimsey Hubley	Hudson Theatre, Broadway.
2023-2024	Prayer for the French Republic	Molly	Samuel J. Friedman Theatre, Broadway.
2025	The Honey Trap	Emily	Irish Repertory Theatre
2026	Birthright	Alona	MCC Theater, Off-Broadway.

== Television ==
Year	Title	Role	
2012	Submissions Only	Dawn Iris	1 episode
2016	Horace & Pete	Brenda	1 episode
2020	New Amsterdam	Melissa Singer	1 episode

== Awards and nominations ==
Year	Award	Category	Nominated work	Result
2012	Drama Desk Award	Outstanding Actress in a Musical	Carrie	Nominated
2012	Lucille Lortel Award	Outstanding Lead Actress	Carrie	Nominated
2012	Drama League Award	Distinguished Performance	Carrie	Nominated
2014	Lucille Lortel Award	Outstanding Lead Actress	Bad Jews	Nominated
