= Greenwich House Theatre =

Theater in New York City

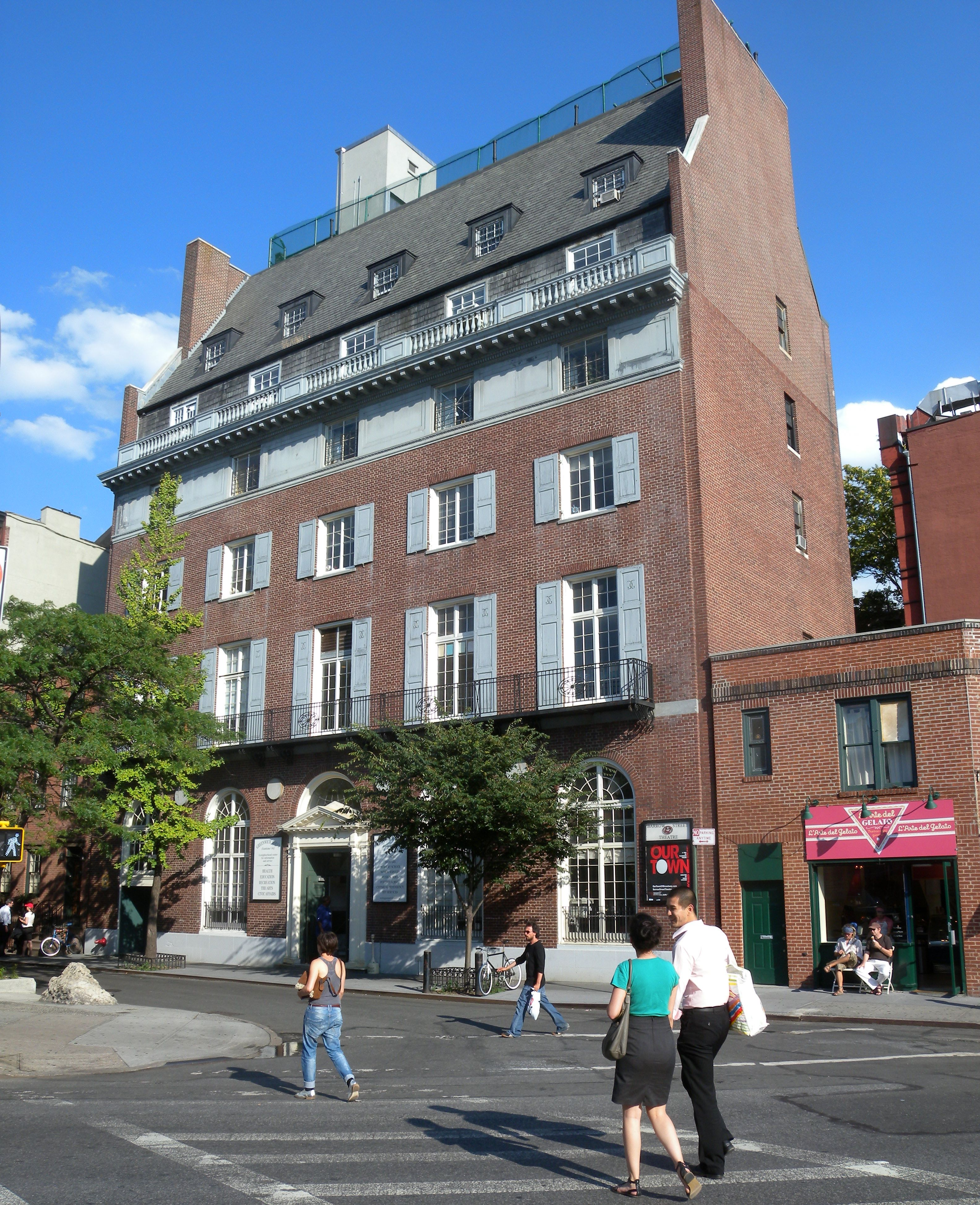
- 27 Barrow Street
- Interactive map of Greenwich House Theatre
- Address: 27 Barrow Street; New York City; United States
- Coordinates: 40°43′56.56″N 74°0′11.34″W
- Owner: Greenwich House
- Capacity: 199
- Type: Off-Broadway

Greenwich House Theatre is the name of both a 199-seat Off-Broadway theatre located in New York City's historic Greenwich House at 27 Barrow Street. The theater space has been operated by Ars Nova since September 1, 2018 under the names Ars Nova at Greenwich House and the Greenwich House Theatre. The theater space, which opened in 1917, has also been home to SoHo Rep.

While under the jurisdiction of the theatre company, the theater was home to a number of Off-Broadway hits, including Bug by Tracy Letts, Buyer and Cellar, Sweeney Todd and Orson's Shadow by Austin Pendleton.

Following their departure from the Greenwich House theatre, Barrow rebranded as Barrow Street Theatricals and produced a number of Off Broadway shows including Nassim Soleimanpour's NASSIM at New York City Center.
