= Bad Jews =

Play written by Joshua Harmon

- Written by: Joshua Harmon
- Original language: English
- Genre: Comedy

Premiere
- Date premiered: 2013
- Place premiered: Black Box Theatre

Bad Jews is a dark comedy play by Joshua Harmon. After a beloved grandfather dies in New York, leaving a treasured piece of religious jewelry that he succeeded in hiding even from the Nazis during the Holocaust, cousins fight over not only the family heirloom, but their "religious faith, cultural assimilation, and even the validity of each other's romances."

== Background ==
Harmon had the idea for the play "after attending a service in which grandchildren of Holocaust survivors were invited to speak." He won a fellowship from the National New Play Network, which provided his playwright-in-residence at the Actor's Express in Atlanta, Georgia, where he developed the play. He finished the first draft of the play in April 2011, and the play was then given a reading at The Lark in New York City, sponsored by the National New Play Network.

== Productions ==
The play premiered Off-Broadway in October 2012 at the Roundabout Theatre Company's Black Box Theatre and then transferred to the Roundabout's Laura Pels Theatre. The play opened at the Laura Pels Theatre on October 3, 2013, and closed on December 29, 2013. Directed by Daniel Aukin, the cast for both productions featured Tracee Chimo as Daphna, Michael Zegen as Liam, Molly Ranson as Melody, and Philip Ettinger as Jonah. Writer Harmon commented: "This is a private fight within the family, and you're somehow intruding, which is an exciting, dangerous place for an audience to be. You're seeing something that is not meant to be seen."

The UK premiere, directed by Michael Longhurst, was at Bath's Ustinov Studio in August 2014 before transferring in 2015 to the West End at the St. James Theatre and in 2015 at the Arts Theatre, in London. The UK cast included Ilan Goodman as Liam, Jenna Augen as Daphna, Gina Bramhill as Melody and Joe Coen as Jonah.

Among regional productions, it played in 2014 and was revived in 2015 at the Studio Theatre in Washington, D.C., and ran at the Geffen Playhouse in Los Angeles. It was revived in 2016 at the Haymarket Theatre. Canada's Koffler Centre of the Arts staged the Toronto premiere of Bad Jews in 2017.

A revival of the original production is announced for an 11-week run at the Arts Theatre in London from July to September 2022. This revival UK cast includes Ashley Margolis as Liam, Rosie Yadid as Daphna, Olivia Le Andersen as Melody and Charlie Beaven as Jonah.

== Awards and nominations ==
The play won the 2014 Lucille Lortel Award, Outstanding Lead Actress in a Play, Tracee Chimo. Jenna Augen also won the UK Theatre Award for Best Actress in a Supporting Role in 2014 for the UK premiere.

- 2014 Lucille Lortel Award nominations:

Outstanding Featured Actor in a Play, Philip Ettinger
Outstanding Featured Actress in a Play, Molly Ranson
Outstanding Play

- 2012–2013 Outer Critics Circle Award nominations:

Outstanding New Off-Broadway Play
Outstanding Actress in a Play, Tracee Chimo
John Gassner Award, Joshua Harmon

- 2014 Off Broadway Alliance Awards nomination, Best New Play
