= Carrie White =

Main character from Stephen King's Carrie

- Sissy Spacek as Carrie White in the 1976 film adaptation.
- First appearance: Carrie (1974)
- Created by: Stephen King
- Portrayed by: Young: Sissy Spacek (1976 film); Linzi Hateley (1988 musical); Angela Bettis (2002 film); Molly Ranson (2012 musical); Chloë Grace Moretz (2013 film); Summer H. Howell (2026 television series); Child: Jodelle Ferland (2002 film); Skyler Wexler (2013 film); Juliet Rose Foley (2026 television series)

In-universe information
- Full name: Carietta Nadine White
- Nickname: Carrie
- Gender: Female
- Occupation: Student
- Family: Margaret White (mother); Ralph White (father); Rachel Lang (half-sister; film sequel only)
- Relatives: John Brigham (maternal grandfather); Judith Brigham (maternal grandmother); Sadie Cochran (maternal great-grandmother)
- Status: Deceased: (1974 novel), (1976 film); Alive: (2002 film), (2026–present; television series); Unknown: (2013 film)

Carietta Nadine "Carrie" White is the title character and protagonist of author Stephen King's first published novel, Carrie.

In every adaption and portrayal of Carrie, she is portrayed as a high school outcast, bullied and abused by students and even her own mother Margaret, an unstable religious fanatic. She also has telekinetic powers that confuse and frighten her, and fuel Margaret's conviction that her daughter is possessed by the Devil.

Since the novel's release, Carrie has appeared in a variety of other media, including four films, a television series and multiple music videos.

== Novel ==
In the novel, Carrie's full name is Carietta N. White, whereas many film adaptations spell her full name as Carrietta. She is depicted as a "frog among swans"; a white girl who has skin often peppered with pimples on her face, shoulders, and buttocks, blonde hair that at times appears completely without color, and incredibly dark brown eyes that appear to cast shadows beneath them. She is also slightly overweight, shy, lonely, and isolated. She is severely bullied at school. Her widowed mother, Margaret, is a mentally unstable religious fanatic who beats her daughter and throws her into a "prayer closet" whenever she does something that her mother thinks is sinful.

When Carrie gets her first period on the floor in the girls' locker room, Carrie panics; she does not know what is happening as Margaret never taught her about menstruation. The terrified Carrie seeks help in the other girls, believing that she is dying. The other girls, led by the popular Chris Hargensen and her friend Sue Snell, shout 'period' over and over and stare at Carrie as she showers. The school gym teacher Rita Desjardin – who pities rather than likes Carrie – punishes the girls who were involved with a week of detention, and bans Chris from the prom when she refuses to comply. Chris schemes for revenge against Carrie with the help of her boyfriend, Billy Nolan.

Meanwhile, Carrie is thrilled when Sue's boyfriend Tommy Ross asks her to the prom, unaware that Sue had asked him to do it in order to atone for bullying her. When Margaret learns about the prom, she is furious, and forbids her to go. Finally fed up with her mother's abuse, Carrie uses her powers to knock Margaret to the floor, and proceeds to go to prom with Tommy.

At the prom, Tommy and Carrie are voted Prom King and Queen – unaware that Chris had engineered Carrie's victory as part of a plan to get revenge for being banned from the prom due to bullying Carrie earlier. As an elated Carrie accepts her crown, Chris and Billy dump a bucket of pig's blood over her head, provoking the entire school, even Desjardin, to start laughing at her. Humiliated and enraged, Carrie loses control of her powers and lets loose a torrent of telekinetic energy that demolishes the school and kills several students. As she walks home, she unleashes her powers on the town as well, destroying several buildings and killing hundreds of people.

When she returns home, she tells Margaret what happened, and Margaret tells her that she has been possessed by Satan and must be destroyed. Margaret attacks Carrie with a carving knife, and reveals that she became pregnant with her after her husband, Carrie's father, raped her. She stabs Carrie in the shoulder, but Carrie murders her by telekinetically stopping her heart.

Mortally wounded, Carrie makes her way to the roadhouse where she was conceived. She sees Chris and Billy leaving, having been informed of the destruction by one of Billy's friends. After Billy attempts to run Carrie over, she telekinetically takes control of his car and sends it racing into the tavern wall, killing both Billy and Chris. Sue finds Carrie collapsed in the parking lot, bleeding out from the knife wound. The two have a brief telepathic conversation thanks to Carrie's abilities in which Carrie realizes that Sue was not involved in the prank. Carrie then dies, crying out for her mother.

== Performers ==
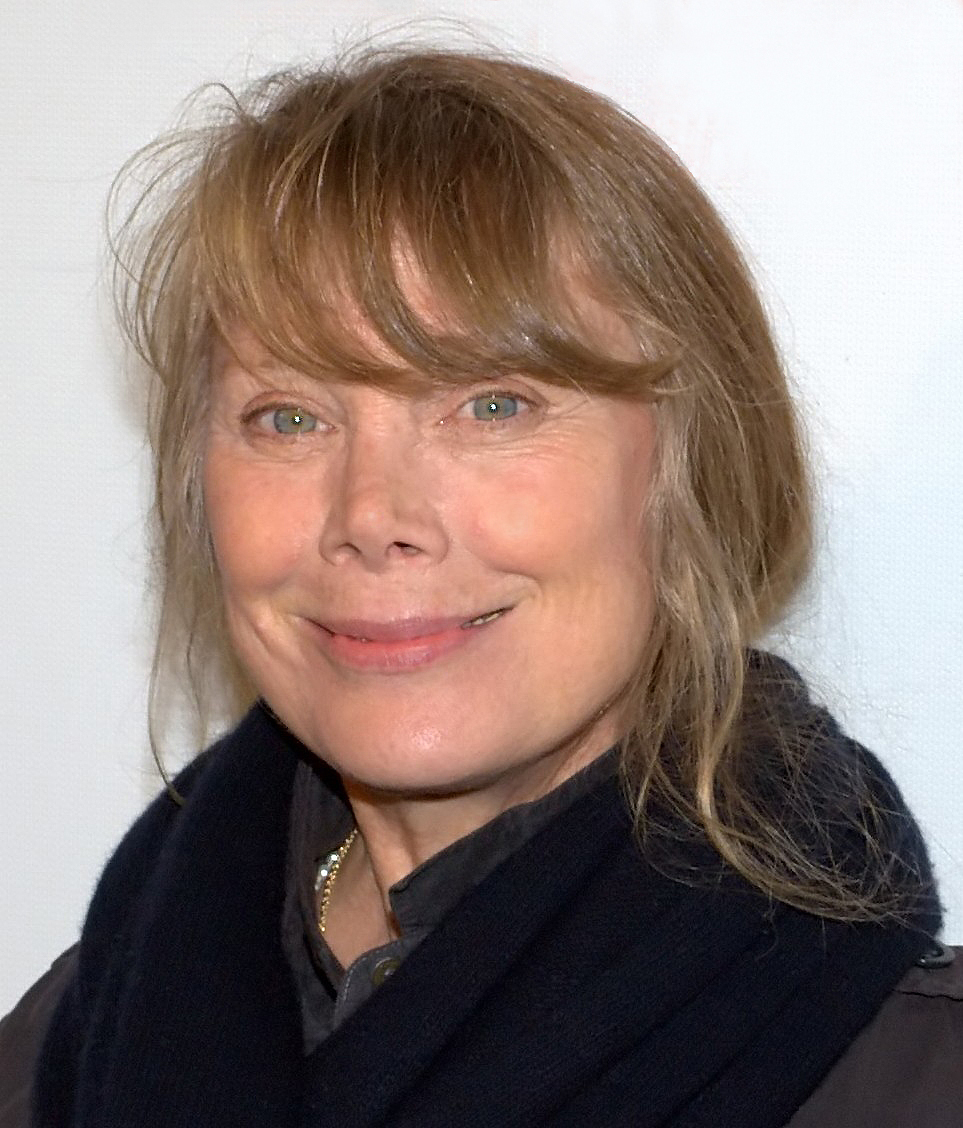
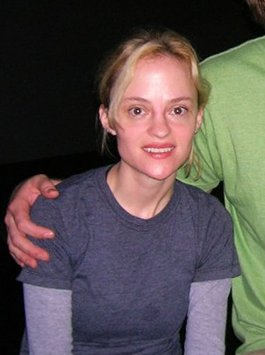
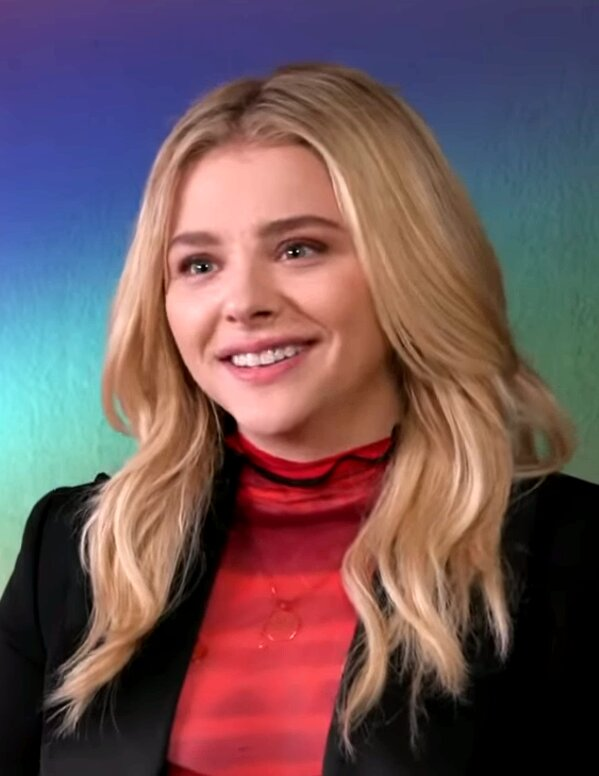
Carrie White has been portrayed by Sissy Spacek in the 1976 film adaptation, Angela Bettis in the 2002 television film, Chloë Grace Moretz in the 2013 adaptation, and Summer H. Howell in the 2026 television series.

Appearances
Carrie (1976)	The Rage: Carrie 2 (1999)	Carrie (2002)	Carrie (2013)	Carrie (2026–present)
Confirmed dead	Archive	Alive	Unknown	Alive

- Sissy Spacek (1976; theatrical film)
- Linzi Hateley (1988; musical)
- Angela Bettis (2002; television film)
- Jodelle Ferland (2002; television film (young Carrie in a flashback sequence))
- Molly Ranson (2012; musical)
- Chloë Grace Moretz (2013; theatrical film)
- Skyler Wexler (2013; theatrical film (young Carrie in a flashback sequence))
- Madelaine Petsch (2018; Riverdale: A Night to Remember (as Cheryl Blossom))
- Emilija Baranac (2018; Riverdale: A Night to Remember (as Midge Klump))
- Summer H. Howell (2026–present; television series)
- Juliet Rose Foley (2026; television miniseries) (young Carrie in a flashback sequence)
- Isabel McGinty (Ice Nine Kills music video)
- Whitney Jones (Common Shiner music videos)

== Musical ==
In 1988, Carrie was adapted into a musical co-produced by the Royal Shakespeare Company. Carrie was portrayed by Linzi Hateley in both the London production and the Broadway transfer. Her songs include "And Eve Was Weak", "Evening Prayers", and "I Remember How Those Boys Could Dance" (duets with Betty Buckley, who also played teacher Miss Collins in the 1976 film, as her mother) and the solos "I'm Not Alone" and "Carrie".

Linzi Hateley won a Theatre World Award for Best Newcomer for this, her first starring role. She recorded the song "Carrie" for her album Sooner or Later.

The pig's blood scene and the ensuing massacre are depicted in the musical number "The Destruction". Carrie seals off the exits, kills everyone present (staged through pyrotechnics and lasers), and brings down the ceiling, burying the promgoers. Carrie sinks to the floor and begins to cry. Margaret arrives in an evening dress, and comforts her. She then stabs Carrie on the school stairs (a "white-on-white staircase to heaven") during the song "Carrie (reprise)" in a moment described by one scholar as "the sort of moment Florenz Ziegfeld might have come up with had a lunatic asked him to stage a Grand Guignol version of his Follies". Carrie uses her powers to stop Margaret's heart before dying herself, comforted by Sue.

=== 2012 revival ===
The 2012 revival of the show portrays a different version of events. The blood is dumped onto Carrie (portrayed by Molly Ranson) from above, as in the book. She slams the doors shut and turns off the lights, creating a blackout. The lights struggle back on in a strobe effect as Carrie forces everyone else to the ground. The students writhe in desperation as Carrie sets the gym on fire, and telekinetically forces Chris Hargensen to break her own neck. Several try to escape but are pinned to the walls. Carrie then leaves, blowing up the gym as she does so. Sue narrates how Carrie cuts a trail of destruction across town on her way home, as Sue herself follows her. At the White home, Carrie finds Margaret reciting prayers. She takes Carrie in her arms and sings softly to her before revealing the kitchen knife and stabbing her. Carrie uses her powers to force the knife out of Margaret's hands before stopping her heart. Sue enters, and cradles Carrie as she dies of her wounds.

== Other media ==
In the 1988 film Friday the 13th Part VII: The New Blood, the character Tina Shepard (played by Lar Park Lincoln) is loosely based on Carrie. This character is much like Carrie with telekinetic abilities she uses to take down Jason Voorhees in the film.

The television series Riverdale featured an episode based on the musical, "Chapter Thirty-One: A Night to Remember", with series stars Madelaine Petsch and Emilija Baranac, who played the characters Cheryl Blossom and Midge Klump as different versions of Carrie, respectively. In this story, Cheryl is a participant for the role of Carrie in the musical. However, the musical's director Kevin Keller (portrayed by Casey Cott) had offered the role to Midge, until she was killed by the Black Hood at the end of the episode.

The music video for "Hell in the Hallways" by the American metal band Ice Nine Kills is based on the story with Isabel McGinity as Carrie. The music videos for Chicago band Common Shiner's "Social Mediasochist" and "On and On" also parody the story with Carrie being played by Whitney Jones. These videos also serve as crossovers with other horror film characters, with the first video depicting Carrie as a student of "Wes Craven's Slasher High School" and being caught in a love triangle between Jason Voorhees and Michael Myers, and the second video being a sequel following Jason and Carrie in their marriage. The music video for "Fantasy", by the British singer Jade Thirlwall, released in 2024, features a sequence based on the prom scene.

The 2011 film Gingerdead Man 3: Saturday Night Cleaver features the telekinetic character Cherry, which parodies Carrie.

The Cartoon Network show The Amazing World of Gumball features a ghost character named Carrie Krueger who is named after both Carrie and Freddy Krueger.
