= Rita Desjardin =

- Betty Buckley as "Miss Collins" in the original 1976 film.
- First appearance: Carrie (1974)
- Created by: Stephen King
- Portrayed by: Betty Buckley (1976 film); Darlene Love (1988 musical); Rena Sofer (2002 film); Carmen Cusack (2012 musical); Judy Greer (2013 film); Amber Midthunder (2026 television series)

In-universe information
- Gender: Female
- Occupation: PE teacher
- Status: Alive: (1974 novel), (2002 & 2013 films); Deceased: (1976 film), "AP Physics" (2026; episode 8)

Miss Rita L. Desjardin is a fictional character created by American author Stephen King in his first published 1974 horror novel Carrie. In the 1976 film adaptation, the character was renamed Miss Collins and portrayed by Betty Buckley. In the 2002, 2013 and 2026 versions, she was played by Rena Sofer, Judy Greer, and Amber Midthunder, respectively. She was renamed Miss Lynn Gardner in the 1988 musical, portrayed by Darlene Love (1988, Broadway) and Carmen Cusack (2012, Off-Broadway), amongst other productions.

== Novel ==
As the story begins, Miss Desjardin secretly feels the same disgust everyone at Ewen High School feels for Carrie White, believing Carrie to be a religious fanatic like Carrie's mother Margaret. However, when she sees Carrie being humiliated by the other girls in the locker room after gym class for her reaction to her first period, she realizes that Carrie is oblivious to what is happening to her; Desjardin feels sorry for Carrie and wonders why Margaret never taught her about menstruation.

Desjardin wants to punish the girls who taunted Carrie by having them suspended for three days and banned from the upcoming senior prom, but the principal settles on a lesser punishment: a week of boot-camp style detention in the gym. In Desjardin's view, the only reason the administrators did not go along with her proposed punishment is that they are all men (unaware that they are all intimidated by lead bully Christine "Chris" Hargensen's father, a prominent lawyer), and thus did not really understand how nasty the girls' behavior had been. Chris defiantly skips the detention and thus is banned from attending the prom. The principal reprimands Desjardin for cursing at Chris, but stands by her when Chris's father threatens to sue the school unless Chris is allowed to attend the prom. He also refuses to fire Desjardin. Meanwhile, Sue Snell, another girl who participated in the locker room incident, feels remorse for her actions and asks her boyfriend Tommy Ross to take Carrie to the prom to make amends.

At the prom, Desjardin talks with Carrie about her own prom night and later, congratulates her for being voted prom queen. As revenge for being banned from prom, Chris secretly has rigged a cord connected to two buckets hidden above the stage where Carrie and Tommy will sit on the thrones. When Chris pulls the cord, both of the buckets tip over, drenching them both with pigs' blood. Desjardin reflexively responds to the prank by laughing. However, she later tries to help Carrie, who pushes her aside with her telekinesis because she saw that Desjardin was laughing and telepathically sees that she is still laughing at her deep down inside. Once outside, although Carrie uses her telekinetic abilities to wreak havoc on the school and destroys the entire town on the way home, Desjardin is one of the few survivors of the "Black Prom".

Two weeks after the disaster, and with 440 people dead, Desjardin retires from teaching, saying she is consumed with guilt for not doing more to help Carrie and that she would rather commit suicide than teach again. She also implies in her resignation letter that she feels guilty for laughing at Carrie like everyone else instead of helping or comforting her.

== Adaptations ==
=== 1976 film ===
In the 1976 film version of the novel, the character is named Miss Collins and portrayed by Betty Buckley. Unlike the character in the book, Miss Collins does not first experience revulsion toward Carrie. After the locker room incident, she punishes the girls, and when Chris argues with her during detention, Miss Collins slaps her. An infuriated Chris storms out of detention, thus locking her out of prom. She becomes more sympathetic and attempts to help Carrie overcome her awkwardness. When she realizes Tommy asked Carrie to prom, Miss Collins reprimands him and Sue for trying to do so.

After Carrie uses her powers to wreak havoc on the school, Miss Collins is seen trying to move the unconscious Tommy, along with another teacher and three students. Carrie, who mistakens Collins as one of the laughing spectators in her vision after being dumped with pig blood by Chris, pulls her across the floor and pins her against the wall as a means to sacrifice her. Carrie then smashes a basketball rafter into Collins' waist, killing her seconds later.

=== 2002 television film ===
In the 2002 version, Rita Desjarden [sic] is portrayed by Rena Sofer. After finding out that Chris and Tina Blake compounded Carrie's locker-room humiliation by vandalizing her locker and filling it with tampons, an angry Desjarden hurls a bag full of tampons at them the next day. She then announces that they have been sentenced to a week of detention, telling them that skipping the punishment will result in three days' suspension and banishment from the prom. Chris, refusing to take her punishment, storms out. The principal reprimands Desjarden, but stands by her when Chris's father threatens a lawsuit unless Desjarden is fired.

At the prom, she talks to Carrie about her own prom date. In this version, she says her date carried a fake gun to imitate James Bond but he ended up arrested. As a result, she remained alone at the prom until her father came and took her home. She also tells Carrie that things change, and not always for the best: The pretty, popular girls will be fat, cute boys will be bald, and the miserable ones might have a happy life. When Carrie begins destroying the gym telekinetically in revenge for being drenched in pigs' blood, Miss Desjarden sends two students to carry the dead Tommy and leads an escape through an air vent (rather than the fire doors, as in the book). She is the last one to leave the gym and is nearly electrocuted, but survives and reports the events to Detective John Mulcahey (David Keith), ultimately denouncing Carrie for wiping the school and the rest of the town out of existence with her powers.

=== 2013 film ===
In the 2013 version, Desjardin is played by Judy Greer. As in previous film portrayals, she sympathizes with Carrie and tries to help her. Desjardin is spared from Carrie's wrath during the prom as she was the only one who was not laughing at Carrie and tried to help clean her up. She uses her telekinesis to throw Desjardin out of the way of falling electrical wires. Desjardin is last seen with her arm in a sling, telling Sue that Tommy is dead.

=== 2026 series ===
In the 2026 series, Desjardin is played by Amber Midthunder. Desjardin is portrayed as a 28-year-old in her first year as a teacher who is disrespected by her students. In the second episode "Foreign Language", Desjardin acknowledges her own history of animosity when she says that "Not long ago, I would've been one of those girls in that locker room tormenting Carrie White" and reflects on how she has changed as a person. Midthunder said that the character sees "a young, vulnerable, hopeful person who is in danger from the world" in Carrie White. Desjardin engages in a romantic relationship with Seth Peist, another teacher at the school.

== Performers ==
- Betty Buckley (1976; theatrical film as Miss Collins)
- Darlene Love (1988; musical)
- Rena Sofer (2002; television film as Miss Desjarden)
- Carmen Cusack (2012; musical)
- Judy Greer (2013; theatrical film)
- Ashleigh Murray (2018; Riverdale: A Night to Remember as Josie McCoy and Miss Gardner)
- Amber Midthunder (2026; television series)

== Musical ==
In Carrie: The Musical, Miss Desjardin becomes Miss Gardner, a composite of the gym teacher and the principal. She opens the show with the song "In" where she orders the girl PE students to "Work, work, work, work!" After the "Shower Scene" Miss Gardner becomes much more sympathetic toward Carrie and even sings "Unsuspecting Hearts" with her to get her to accept Tommy's prom invitation. Miss Gardner was a chaperone at the prom, and (in most productions) is tragically killed in Carrie's onslaught. She was portrayed by Darlene Love in the Stratford-on-Avon and Broadway production of the musical.

In the 2012 revival, she was portrayed by Carmen Cusack.

=== Other media ===
The television series Riverdale, featured an episode based on the musical "Chapter Thirty-One: A Night to Remember", with series star Ashleigh Murray, who played Josie McCoy as Gardner.
