= Sue Snell =

- Amy Irving as Sue Snell in the 1976 film.
- First appearance: Carrie (1974)
- Created by: Stephen King
- Portrayed by: Amy Irving (1976 film, The Rage); Sally Ann Triplett (1988 musical); Kandyse McClure (2002 film); Christy Altomare (2012 musical); Gabriella Wilde (2013 film); Siena Agudong (2026 television series)

In-universe information
- Full name: Susan D. Snell
- Gender: Female
- Occupation: Student; Autobiographer (at the end of the novel); School counselor (film sequel only)
- Family: Eleanor Snell (mother; name in 1976 film)
- Status: Alive: (1974 novel), (2002 & 2013 films), (2026–present; television series); Deceased: (The Rage)

Susan D. "Sue" Snell is a fictional character created by American author Stephen King in his first published 1974 horror novel, Carrie.

This character is portrayed as a popular teenage girl who torments Carrie White in the locker room but then begins to feel remorse for her actions. In the novel, she asks her boyfriend to take Carrie to the prom in an attempt to make Carrie feel accepted and to ease her own conscience. In this, she has been described as the "godmother" in King's "dark modernization of Cinderella". The disaster that takes place at the high school prom is set in place when Tommy accepts.

The character of Sue also appears in the 1999 film sequel, The Rage: Carrie 2, played by Amy Irving reprising her role from the 1976 film version of King's novel.

== Novel ==
In the novel, King uses commentaries by Sue Snell as one of his innovative narrative techniques to tell Carrie's history. Sue is a popular student at Ewen High School. When Carrie breaks down emotionally after having her first period in the shower, unaware of what menstruation is, Sue joins her classmates in gleefully taunting her and pelting her with tampons, repeatedly chanting, "Plug it up!" Their gym teacher, Rita Desjardin, who broke up the incident and calmed the panicking Carrie down, says that Sue is not a bully by nature and therefore her participation in the shower incident is out of character. It is implied that Sue only acted under peer pressure, being one of popular girl Chris Hargensen's friends, and, therefore, under the pressure of Chris to avoid becoming a potential victim herself. When the prank happened, Sue had been dating Tommy Ross for six months. While preparing for the prom, purchasing a gown and accepting Tommy's invitation, Sue begins to plan for Carrie to go to the prom in her place.

Staying home on prom night, she begins to doubt her own motives: worry about her late period – she both fears and hopes she is pregnant – and the possibility of Tommy falling for Carrie. When the town whistle begins blowing, Sue looks out her window, sees the fire at the school and rushes to her mother's car. Speeding towards the school, Sue is horrified when the school explodes. She slams on the brakes, and the car screeches to a stop, throwing her against the steering wheel. She gets out of the car, and is knocked down by the explosion of a gas station nearby. She later flags down a deputy sheriff, who interrogates her. The deputy later recalls Sue stating "They've hurt Carrie for the last time", indicating that she had no part in what happened.

Three hours later, Sue finds Carrie lying by a wrecked car driven by Billy Nolan and Chris Hargensen, near death from being stabbed by her mother Margaret. Sue and Carrie have a brief telepathic conversation as Carrie uses her telepathy to communicate with Sue, in which she convinces Carrie she had no part in Chris's plan. Carrie cries out for her mother and dies, every detail of her death witnessed by a horrified Sue, who later identifies Carrie's body for the official records. As Sue flees the scene, her period begins, insinuating that if she had been pregnant with Tommy's child, the trauma of the night had caused her to miscarry.

Sue is soon targeted by a blue-ribbon panel investigating the "Black Prom" as a partial instigator of the setup to humiliate Carrie at the prom. Sue accuses the commission of wanting a scapegoat, admitting that she only wanted to help Carrie have a normal life and that schools should do more to prevent bullying. In 1986, she publishes a fictional book, My Name is Susan Snell, which details the events of the prom from her perspective, reminding readers that "we were kids" and apt to make faulty choices even while trying to do right.

== Adaptations ==
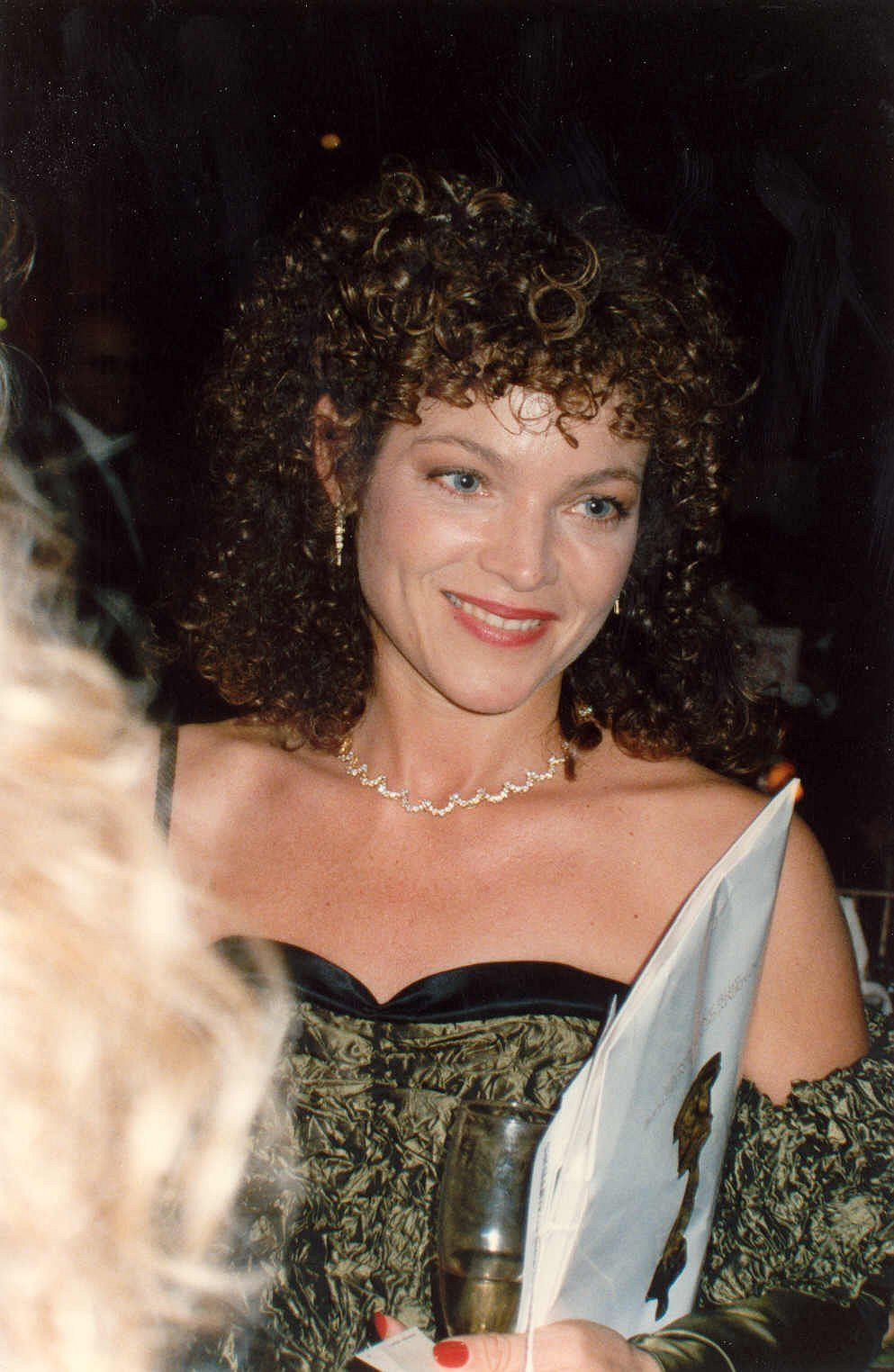
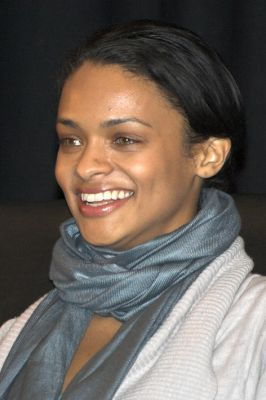
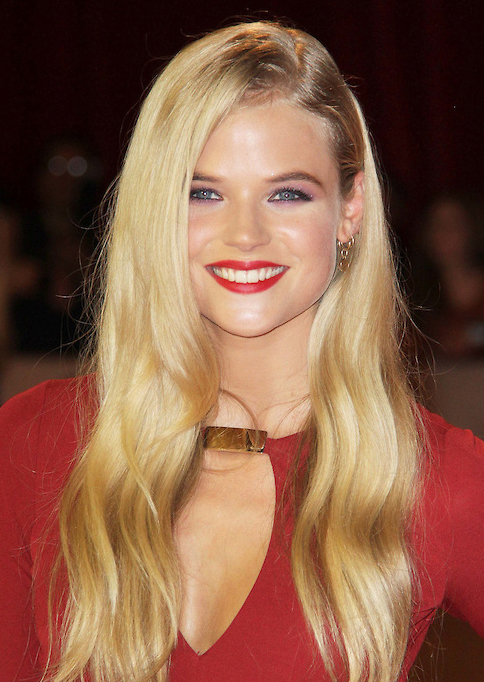
Sue Snell has been portrayed by Amy Irving in the 1976 film adaptation and the sequel The Rage: Carrie 2 (1999), Kandyse McClure in the 2002 television film and Gabriella Wilde in the 2013 adaptation.

=== 1976 film ===
In the original film adaptation by Brian De Palma, Sue is portrayed by Amy Irving.

Sue helps lead Carrie's locker room humiliation; she even opens a counter where pads and tampons are stored and starts throwing them at Carrie while starting the chant of "Plug it up! Plug it up!" However, feeling guilty about it, she eventually asks her boyfriend, Tommy Ross (William Katt), to take Carrie to the prom. Unlike the novel, Sue doesn’t seem to feel worried over the possibilities of Tommy falling in love with Carrie. She instead heads over to the school and sneaks into the prom to check on them, and is happy to see Carrie smiling and being elected prom queen. Sue then notices the cord running along the stage, leading up to the bucket of pig blood above Carrie. When Sue investigates the inside of the stage, she catches Chris briefly, but is forced out of the auditorium by Miss Collins (Betty Buckley) (who erroneously believes her to be interrupting the ceremony out of jealousy and does not listen to her protestations), seconds before the cord is pulled and Carrie is splattered with the blood. Before Sue can get back in, Carrie mentally closes all of the gym doors, locking Sue out while the chaos begins inside, with her presumedly escaping the building before it burned down.

Following the death of all of her classmates, Sue is seen in her bedroom some time later after seeming to have had some sort of mental breakdown. Her mother did not let her attend any of the funerals and is seen talking to a friend about the aftermath, saying the family will leave town to avoid the media circus. Sue has a dream in which she lays flowers on the burnt lot of Carrie's house, only to have Carrie suddenly reach her bloody arm through the rubble to grab Sue. She wakes up in hysterics and is quickly comforted by her mother Eleanor (Priscilla Pointer, who is also Irving's mother in real life).

=== Sequel ===
In the 1999 film The Rage: Carrie 2, set over twenty years later, Snell (again portrayed by Irving) is a guidance counselor at the new high school. It is revealed that the events of the first film traumatized her to the point that she spent time at a mental institution. However, after she was released, she became a school counselor and also did some studies on telekinesis. She begins to notice a telekinetic spark in an awkward student named Rachel Lang, following the suicide of Rachel's best friend Lisa. While talking to Rachel in her office, Sue upsets her, causing Rachel to shatter Sue's globe, scaring the both of them before Sue realized that she was right – Rachel has the same powers that Carrie did.

Sue visits the mental institution housing Rachel's mother, Barbara. Knowing that telekinesis is a trait passed on through the father, she tries to find out the identity of Rachel's father. Barbara reveals that Rachel's father was Ralph White – Carrie's father.

Sue tries to first get Rachel to admit to her abilities before trying to help her in an attempt to prevent another meltdown, even bringing Rachel to the site of the original high school that Carrie destroyed in the first film. This only distresses Rachel further, even more so when Sue tells her that she is Carrie's half-sister.

Desperate to prevent a repeat of Carrie's experience, Sue sneaks Barbara out of the asylum. Sue rushes to an after-game party at Mark Bing's mansion, but Rachel has already been humiliated and is in a rage. She closes off the mansion doors and launches a fire poker at a boy, unaware that Sue and Barbara are trying to get inside. The poker tears through the front door and through Sue's head, killing her.

One critic wrote that the audience had a "considerable amount invested" in Snell by this point in the film and although her sudden death was "certainly powerful in terms of shock effect", it "also makes the rest of the film seem incomplete".

=== 2002 television film ===
In the 2002 television film, Sue is portrayed by South African-born Canadian actress Kandyse McClure. This version of Sue is African-American. She and her best friend, Helen Shyres, are both popular students at Ewen High School, and are members of the popular clique led by Chris Hargensen, however, neither Sue nor Helen appear to really like Chris at all. After Ms. Desjarden forces the girls involved in the prank against Carrie to attend boot-camp style detention if they want to attend the prom, Chris tries to rally the girls, but Sue silences Chris.

Sue feels sorry about how she treated Carrie, especially after learning that Chris and her top henchwoman, Tina Blake, vandalized Carrie's locker and filled it with tampons. She asked her boyfriend, Tommy Ross, to take Carrie to the prom instead of her. Once Carrie accepts, Sue helps her get ready for the prom, something she did not do in any other portrayal. She assists Carrie with her make-up, helping her choose a good shade of lipstick.

Following the destruction at the prom and the death of Carrie's religious fanatic mother Margaret, Sue eventually finds Carrie, unconscious in a bathtub full of bloody water. Sue pulls her out and successfully revives her; Carrie telepathically links with Sue's mind and Sue sees Carrie's entire life (in the book, Carrie sees Sue's entire life, proving her innocence and a little later Carrie later shows Sue her entire life, too). Sue is interrogated by the police, and claims to have found Carrie dead and left her. In truth, she hid Carrie in the ruins of the school until things calmed down. The police initially suspect that Sue was somehow in on Chris and Billy's scheme to humiliate Carrie, but are convinced of her innocence when Jackie Talbot reveals Sue had no knowledge of it. Later, Sue drives Carrie to Florida to help her start a new life.

=== 2013 film ===
Gabriella Wilde was cast as Sue in 2013 version of Carrie. In concordance to the novel, Sue is pregnant at the end of the film. When she enters the White house, Carrie at first contemplates killing her but lets her go. When she begins bringing the house down Sue attempts to get her out of it. Carrie is able to sense that Sue is pregnant with a girl and saves her life by telekinetically sending her out of the house. After the events of the prom, she is summoned to court to help uncover what role Carrie played. In the following voice-over, she admits that Carrie caused the disaster, and blames everyone else, including herself, for instigating it. After that, she visits Carrie's vandalized grave and puts a white rose on it and leaves. Later, the headstone cracks and Carrie's enraged scream is heard.

In an alternate ending, Sue is seen in the hospital giving birth, when suddenly a bloody hand comes out of the birth canal and grabs her. Sue then wakes up screaming in her mother's arms, still visibly pregnant.

=== 2026 television series ===
Siena Agudong was cast as Sue in the 2026 television series adaptation of Carrie. She is shown to have been an active achiever in extracurricular activities, and is the incumbent Class President. Unlike the novel, she is not pregnant at the end of the series. Sue's pregnancy scare leads her and Tommy Ross to break up amicably after she did not imagine a future with him, leading Tommy to invite Carrie to the prom as a friend (instead of being asked by Sue to ask her as a favor as in the novel and prior adaptations). Sue helps get Chris suspended and ultimately expelled from Ewen High School for operating a cyberbullying sockpuppet Instragram account under the handle 'Carrie Red' by secretly recording her admission; in retaliation, Chris posts a picture of Sue buying a pregnancy test. Arriving at the prom too late to prevent Carrie being drenched in pig's blood, Sue witnesses the carnage Carrie unleashes in the hall but survives. Sue provides witness testimony of the prom including the presence of members of an 'Others' cult, an "exploding shadow" (Emaline West in astral form) and Amanda West (an anti-Others vigilante); however, as she unwittingly gives her testimony to the cultists posing as investigators, they erase her (and Tina Blake's) memory of their involvement in it.

== Performers ==
- Amy Irving (1976, 1999; theatrical film and The Rage)
- Sally Ann Triplett (1988; musical)
- Kandyse McClure (2002; television film)
- Christy Altomare (2012; musical)
- Gabriella Wilde (2013; theatrical film)
- Lili Reinhart (2018; Riverdale: A Night to Remember (as Betty Cooper))
- Siena Agudong (2026; television series)

== Musical ==
In 1988, the property was adapted for a musical. Sue was portrayed by Sally Ann Triplett in both the London and the Broadway productions. As in other adaptations, she is dating Tommy and does not attend the prom. Sue is shown as being much more sorrowful for Carrie than in the other versions. She has one solo song, "It Hurts to be Strong", which she sings when challenged by her friends as to why she is being kind to Carrie. The musical closes as the book does, with Sue comforting the dying Carrie.

In a reading in November 2009, Sue was played by Tony nominee Jennifer Damiano.

In the 2012 Off-Broadway revival at the Lucille Lortel Theater, Sue was played by Christy Altomare. In this adaption, Sue is telling the story of the night of May 28 while she is interrogated from the beginning to the end of the show.

=== Other media ===
The episode "Chapter Thirty-One: A Night to Remember" of the television series Riverdale shows the Riverdale characters putting on Carrie: The Musical. In the episode, the character Betty Cooper (played by Lili Reinhart) plays Sue.
