= Carrie (2002 film) =

2002 film by David Carson

- Promotional poster
- Genre: Supernatural horror; Teen drama
- Based on: Carrie by Stephen King
- Teleplay by: Bryan Fuller
- Directed by: David Carson
- Starring: Angela Bettis; Patricia Clarkson; Rena Sofer; Kandyse McClure; Emilie de Ravin
- Music by: Laura Karpman
- Countries of origin: Canada; United States
- Original language: English

Production
- Executive producers: Bryan Fuller; Mark Stern; Pen Densham; John Watson
- Producers: David Carson; Stephen Geaghan
- Production locations: Vancouver, British Columbia, Canada
- Cinematography: Victor Goss
- Editor: Jeremy Presner
- Running time: 132 minutes
- Production companies: Trilogy Entertainment Group; MGM Television

Original release
- Network: NBC
- Release: November 4, 2002

Carrie is a 2002 supernatural horror television film based on the 1974 novel by Stephen King. As the second film adaptation and third film in the Carrie franchise, it sticks closely to the original story. The film was written by Bryan Fuller, directed by David Carson, and stars Angela Bettis in the leading role. In the story, Carrie White, a shy girl who was harassed by her schoolmates, is declared dead after a horrific event at her high school, and a series of flashbacks reveal what has happened to her.

An international co-production between Canada and the United States, Carrie was produced by Trilogy Entertainment Group and MGM Television at the request of television network NBC. Filmed in Vancouver, it was commissioned as a stand-alone feature by the network, but the studios intended it as a backdoor pilot for a potential television series. The ending had to be changed accordingly, but no follow-up series was ever produced.

The film premiered on NBC on November 4, 2002, when it was viewed by 12.21 million people. Despite receiving award nominations for Best Television Presentation at the 29th Saturn Awards and Outstanding Achievement in Cinematography at the 2002 American Society of Cinematographers Awards, the film was panned by critics. It was criticized for poor special effects, lack of a horror atmosphere, and long runtime; however, the performances from the cast, particularly Bettis and Patricia Clarkson (as the mother), were acclaimed.

== Plot ==
Police interview several people, including high-school student Sue Snell and gym teacher Rita Desjarden. Detective John Mulcahey is investigating the disappearance of a high-school student and suspect of arson, Carrie White. These interviews reveal the preceding events through flashbacks.

One week before the prom at Ewen High School, Carrie White is a lonely, shy girl who is bullied by the popular girls, most notably Chris Hargensen and Tina Blake. After gym class, when Carrie has her first period while taking a shower, the girls assault and humiliate her until Ms. Desjarden intervenes and comforts Carrie. Principal Morton decides to send Carrie home but addresses her by the wrong name. An infuriated Carrie yells out, causing Morton's desk to move several inches. Making her way home, Carrie is accosted by a boy on a bicycle, whose joke goes wrong when he inexplicably flies off his bike and crashes into a tree. On arrival at her house, Carrie has a flashback of her childhood. Her fanatically religious mother, Margaret White, who considers menstruation a sign of sexual sin, locks Carrie in her "prayer closet" as punishment.

On Monday, Ms. Desjarden gives the girls a week's detention for their bullying of Carrie. If any of them skips detention, they will be suspended and therefore banned from the prom. Chris is the only one who refuses to comply, so she is banned from prom. After Chris's father John Hargensen, a lawyer, unsuccessfully attempts to rescind the ban, she enlists her boyfriend Billy Nolan to get revenge on Carrie. Meanwhile, Carrie discovers she has telekinesis, the ability to move objects with her mind. After a telekinetic episode in class, Carrie goes home and practices her talent. Sue, who feels sorry for tormenting Carrie, asks her boyfriend Tommy Ross to take Carrie to the prom. With some trepidation, Carrie agrees. When she tells her mother about the prom invitation, Margaret forbids her to go. At last, Carrie is provoked into using her powers to confront her mother and Margaret seemingly gives in.

On prom night, Tina switches the prom ballots with fake ones so that Carrie and Tommy are elected the Prom Queen and King. As Tommy and Carrie take their place onstage, Chris, who has been hiding in the rafters with Billy, pulls a rope, causing a bucket of pig blood to fall onto Carrie. Chris releases the rope and the bucket falls on Tommy's head, killing him.

Carrie goes into a shock-induced trance and locks everyone inside the gym to begin her revenge on the school. In the trance, Carrie makes the whole room shake, causing lights to fall and spark, crushing and electrocuting people as they try to flee, whilst one light crashes and starts a fire. The sprinkler system gets activated, and when Carrie brings down an electronic scoreboard to hit the wet floor, it sends an electric shock to everyone else in the gymnasium, killing them all, except for a few students who escape through a vent with Ms. Desjarden.

Carrie then leaves the burning school to walk home, unleashing a wave of destruction throughout the town. When Chris and Billy see Carrie walking towards them, Billy tries to run her down, but Carrie tosses their truck into a pole, killing them.

When Carrie arrives home, she gets into a bathtub, where she finally snaps back to herself but with no recollection of what has just happened. Margaret comes into the bathroom and deems her daughter a witch for destroying the town and then attempts to drown her in the tub. With her last ounce of strength, Carrie stops her mother's heart. Sue finds Carrie and manages to revive her by administering mouth-to-mouth resuscitation. At Sue's suggestion, Carrie fakes her own death and Sue sneaks her out of town to Florida. As the two drive off, Carrie has a nightmarish vision of her mother. When she wakes up, she hallucinates Chris lunging at her. Noticing this, Sue asks her if she wants to stop for a moment, but Carrie tells her to keep driving.

== Cast ==
- Angela Bettis as Carrie White
  - Jodelle Ferland as Little Carrie White
- Patricia Clarkson as Margaret White
- Rena Sofer as Miss Desjarden
- Kandyse McClure as Sue Snell
- Emilie de Ravin as Chris Hargensen
- Tobias Mehler as Tommy Ross
- Jesse Cadotte as Billy Nolan
- Meghan Black as Norma Watson
- Chelan Simmons as Helen Shyres
- Katharine Isabelle as Tina Blake
- David Keith as Detective John Mulcahey
- Miles Meadows as Kenny Garson
- Tyler Foley as Lou Garson
- Laurie Murdoch as Principal Morton
- Michael Kopsa as John Hargensen
- Michaela Mann as Estelle Horan
- Deborah DeMille as Mrs. Horan
- Malcolm Scott as Jackie Talbot
- Steve Byers as Roy Evarts
- Erin Karpluk as Madeline
- Bill Dow as Mr. Scharnhorst
- Andrew Robb as Danny Erbter
- David Neale as Officer Plessy
- Savannah Walker as Rachel Spies
- Laura Boddington as Female Student in Locker Room
- Paul Dzenkiw as Male Student in Library
- Michael J. Tomaso as Male Student/Promgoer
- Nicole Watson as Female Student/Promgoer

== Production ==
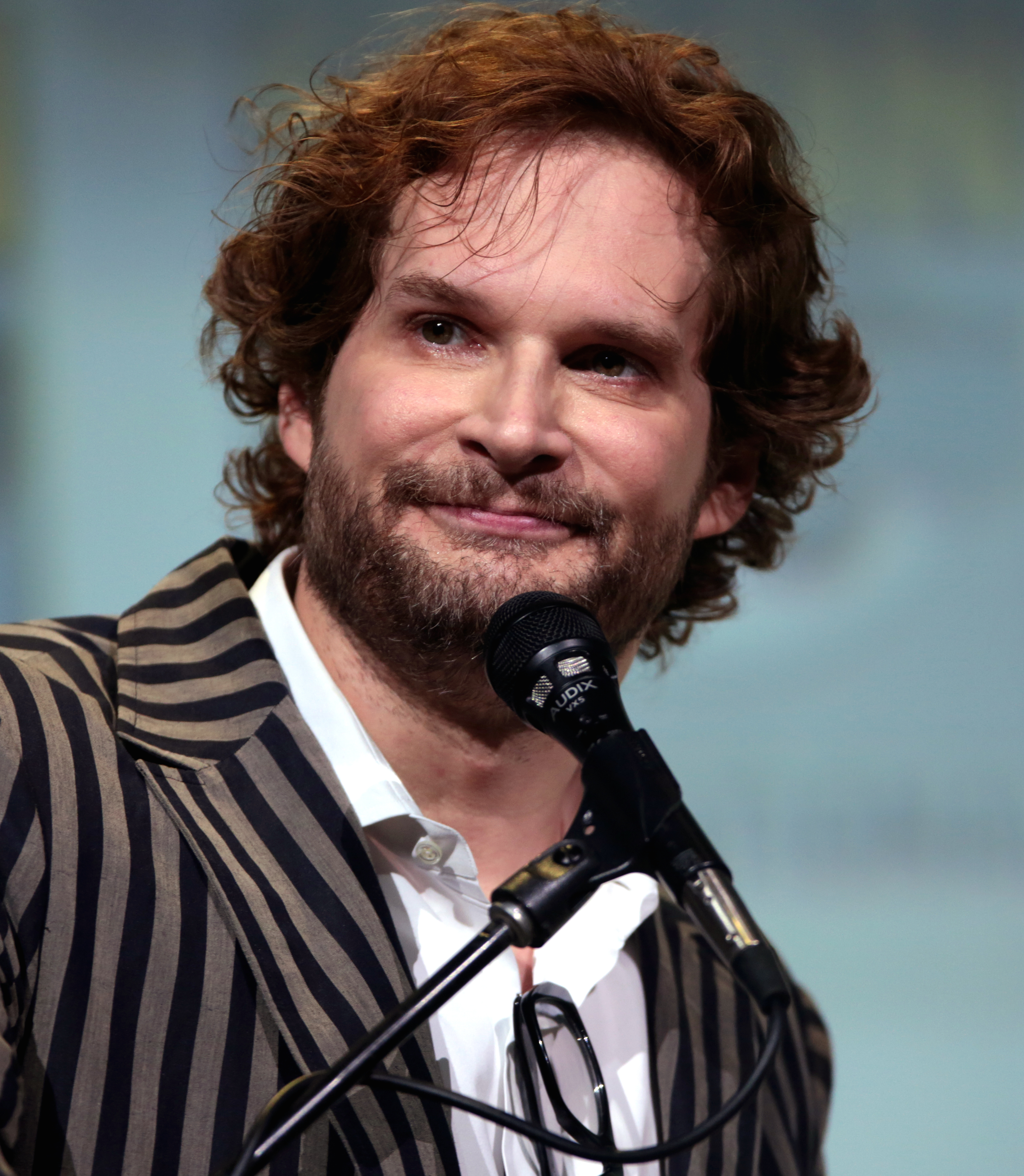
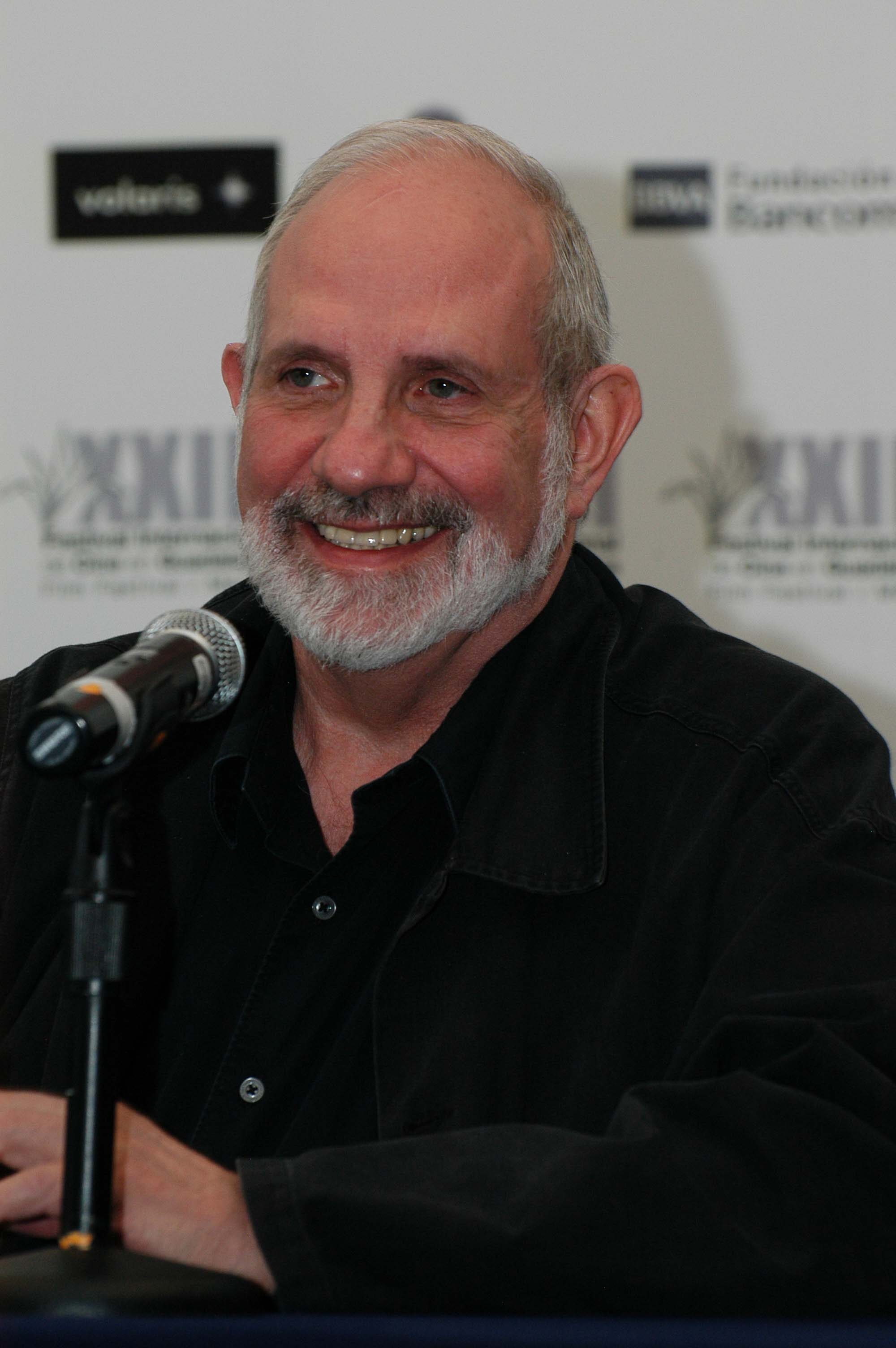
Bryan Fuller (left) wrote the teleplay for the 2002 Carrie adaptation, based on the 1976 film by Brian De Palma (right).

In May 2002, television network NBC commissioned a film adaptation of Stephen King's novel Carrie. Filming started the following month in Vancouver, British Columbia, Canada, on June 12, and took at least twenty days. (Note: No source informs when the filming was concluded or how much time it took. However, by July 2, 2002, Variety reported it was still underway.) King had no involvement in this version after another film adaptation, The Rage: Carrie 2 (1999), disappointed him. It was produced by MGM Television and Trilogy Entertainment Group based on a teleplay by Bryan Fuller.

The network originally wanted a "movie-of-the-week", but the studio wanted to capitalize on the production so it was planned as a backdoor pilot for a potential television series. Although the producers tried to be faithful to King's novel, in order to allow for a continuation of the story, the ending was changed so that Carrie White remained alive. Fuller had earlier considered the idea of giving Carrie's abilities to Sue Snell or the creation of "another Carrie", but he deemed killing a character "who is victimized her entire life" as "really cruel". The adaptation was developed with the intention of creating a sub-plot for the series, featuring Jasmine Guy as Ruby Moore, a paranormal investigator, but these scenes were ultimately cut.

Envisaged as a remake of Brian De Palma's 1976 film, Fuller aimed to "give it [...] a little more of an epic feel" rather than the fairy tale-feeling Fuller ascribed to the original. He also thought his version could add "a little more depth" with "some scope to the characters and the situation", which was not present in the original. The writer said Angela Bettis' portrayal of the role was meant to give Carrie a "more edgy" characterization instead of the "victim" feeling he believed Sissy Spacek gave to her in De Palma's film. In his words:

[Carrie] is not a murderer, and, especially the way Angela portrays her, she is a sympathetic, sweet soul who is a bit more edgy than Sissy Spacek's Carrie. Sissy portrayed her as—I don't want to say pathetic, but just really as a victim. Angela give[s] the character such a strong core, and we felt that we couldn't turn this character who was so sweet into a murderer and then kill her. We wanted to give her another chance. We wanted to see her blossom and triumph over this instead of losing again.

Fuller sought to update the film's 1970s setting to a contemporary one, aware that high-school violence, in particular, has changed since then. Because Fuller felt the Columbine High School massacre was still on people's recent memory, he was careful in addressing the film's "teenage vigilante" theme.

== Release ==
Carrie was first broadcast in the United States on NBC at 8 pm EST on November 4, 2002. According to Nielsen Media Research, the film was viewed by an estimated 12.21 million people. It had a 5.0/12 household rating among males aged 18–49, making it the third most-watched airing for this demographic. Among women aged 18–34, it was the most-watched program with a 6.3/16 rating. Carrie also obtained the best 18–49 score for a single-part made-for-TV broadcast since ABC's broadcast of Brian's Song in December 2001.

The film was later released in VHS and DVD formats by MGM Home Entertainment on August 12, 2003. Scream Factory released it in Blu-ray format as double feature along with The Rage: Carrie 2 on April 14, 2015; a Region A disc, it featured English-only subtitles and contained a new audio commentary with director David Carson and cinematographer Victor Goss.

== Reception ==
The film was poorly received by film critics; it currently has an approval rating of 32% on Rotten Tomatoes based on 41 reviews, with an average rating of 5.4 out of 10. The site's critics consensus reads: "This made-for-TV adaptation of Stephen King's classic fails to impress or bring anything new to the table, - or to the prom - paling even more in comparison to the 1970's memorable version".

Several critics questioned the necessity of a new Carrie, considering a remake of the original classic to be unneeded. (Note: Examples: Stasi: "I could never figure out why anyone would bother to remake a great movie"; Guthmann: "There's no good reason why 'Carrie' ... needed to be remade"; Johnson: "There is, first of all, no reason ... to remake 'Carrie' ") People's Tom Gliatto summarized it as a "pointless remake". Some reviewers considered it to be excessively derivative of De Palma's film, (Note: Examples: Guthmann: "'Carrie' often feels directly lifted from the DePalma film"; Hanley: "the scripts ... are too slow and derivative of the original novel and film to really make an impact"; Arrigo: "there are still many aspects to this production that simply rehash what De Palma did before".) and others assessed it unfavorably in comparison to the 1976 film. (Note: Guthmann labeled it as a "sorry impostor", while Gliatto affirmed it "can't hold a Roman candle to Brian DePalma's 1976 film".) Steve Johnson from the Chicago Tribune disagreed, arguing that the flashback structure "make[s] it more than just a rehash of the first film". It also elicited praise from Ron Wertheimer, who wrote for The New York Times that the flashbacks and the new ending were creative ideas. John Levesque of Seattle Post-Intelligencer and Anthony Arrigo of Dread Central, however, felt the former alteration was not an improvement, calling the conclusion "so undramatic" and "undeniably weak", respectively.

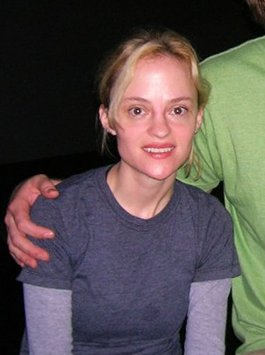
While the film was generally poorly received by critics, Angela Bettis's performance was highly lauded.

While Johnson considered the film "a respectable piece of work", owing to an intelligent script that developed all of King's themes, Wertheimer classified it negatively within "the generic made-for-television standard". Ian Jane of DVD Talk opined Carrie was "decent enough" for the limitations of a TV film, and Arrigo said "the lack of cinematic quality" reflected the television standards of the 2000s. Although Wertheimer claimed that the film's drawbacks were not simply caused by the medium, he did make the criticism that the prom scenes were sapped by the commercial breaks: the filmmakers, he argued, should have opted for a shorter sequence. SF Gate's Edward Guthmann also criticized the film's overall length, especially in regard to the prom scene, as he considered the "dramatic impact" was not enhanced. Phil Gallo of Variety likewise felt some scenes were extended just to fit the time needed for the next break. Randy Miller III of DVD Talk said that the home media release evidenced "gaps in the action" caused by the commercials.

The film's special effects were heavily criticized. (Note: Gallo considered them to be "a fizzle"; Wertheimer called them "passable", and Jane declared, "some of the effects work is just plain bad to the point where it can be unintentionally funny". Arrigo said about a specific scene that "the effect is not dissimilar to something an app on my smart phone can produce".) Fuller himself called the effects "cheap". Levesque and Gallo found their usage to be excessive, and the former said the film suddenly "shifts into a special effects bonanza". Another common complaint was that the film was not scary, which led Levesque to write that "the new Carrie doesn't even fit the category [of scary-movie genre]". Gallo found that it deviated from horror in favor of "prurient side routes", mentioning Rena Sofer's acting, as well as locker-room and post-coital scenes. Johnson made a similar remark on the sexual content.

Most of the praise the film received was directed towards its cast, (Note: Examples: Stasi: "Everything works – starting with the cast"; Hanley: "Each film has their high points, with Carrie (2002) sporting a solid cast"; Jane: "Where this version succeeds ... is ... in its performances") although Wertheimer and Arrigo were critical about the acting. While Patricia Clarkson, Kandyse McClure, and David Keith were praised by more than one reviewer, (Note: Hanley considered "strong performances" were delivered by Keith, Clarkson and Bettis. Stasi praised the "well-cast" Clarkson, while declared, "Even David Keith as the detective investigating the horror is perfect in the role". Gallo considered Sue was "played smartly" by McClure, while Levesque said "McClure creates a Sue far more mysterious than Amy Irving's original". Jane wrote, "Rena Sofer is decent as Miss Desjarden and Kandyse McClure plays the 'queen bitch' of the high school [sic] really well but it's Patricia Clarkson and Angela Bettis who do most of the heavy lifting here".) Bettis's performance was especially praised. (Note: Examples: Gallo: "Angela Bettis does an admirable job as Carrie"; Wertheimer: "Better than passable is the performance of tonight's Carrie, Angela Bettis ... Ms. Bettis manages to breathe some life into Mr. King's allegorical character"; Stasi: "Bettis ... does such a bang up job that if she doesn't win an Emmy for this role, she should spontaneously combust"; Hanley: "Angela Bettis is incredibly spectacular"; Johnson: "Bettis ... makes a very convincing Carrie White"; The Telegraph's Anne Billson retrospectively called it an "unremarkable save for a terrific central performance by Angela Bettis".) Linda Stasi of the New York Post was one of those who thought a remake was unnecessary, so she had low expectations for the film. Stasi, however, concluded she had been "completely mistaken"; she was positively surprised by the acting and went so far as to state that Bettis should win an Emmy Award for her performance. Wertheimer remarked that Bettis expressed the character's emotions well, and lamented that the film "affords Ms. Bettis few opportunities for such genuine acting".

At the 29th Saturn Awards, Carrie was nominated for Best Single Television Presentation, but the winner was Taken. It was also nominated for the 2003 American Society of Cinematographers Awards in the Movie of the Week or Pilot (Network) category; CSI: Miami's "Cross Jurisdictions" won it.

== Television series ==
Although it obtained "strong numbers", according to Variety, the series was never produced. Fuller and Bettis were expected to reprise their roles, and the writer had a concept in mind: he hoped to create a series in which Carrie had to deal with the remorse and the responsibility for killing several (234) people. The series would also feature Carrie and Sue on a journey to help other people with telekinetic powers. Fuller wrote the outline for a second episode, but NBC had no interest in it, so MGM ended their deal. In Fuller's opinion, "the network [n]ever intended to do a series, they were just playing the studio".

Another remake based on the Carrie novel and the 1976 film was released in 2013. Directed by Kimberly Peirce and starring Chloë Grace Moretz, it was created after producers felt the 2002 version did not capture modern bullying. However, David Rooney of The Hollywood Reporter has described the 2002 film as a faithful adaptation of the novel.

A reboot television series adaptation of the novel was developed by Mike Flanagan and starring Summer H. Howell in the titular role. The series premiered on Amazon Prime Video in October 2026. Fuller makes a cameo in its penultimate episode "Romantic Literature".
