= Carrie (musical) =

1988 musical

- The Musical
- Official poster for the original Stratford-upon-Avon production.
- Music: Michael Gore
- Lyrics: Dean Pitchford
- Book: Lawrence D. Cohen
- Basis: Carrie by Stephen King
- Premiere: February 13, 1988: Royal Shakespeare Theatre, Stratford-upon-Avon
- Productions: 1988 Stratford-upon-Avon (tryout); 1988 Broadway

Carrie (also known as Carrie: The Musical) is a musical with a book by Lawrence D. Cohen, lyrics by Dean Pitchford, and music by Michael Gore. It is based on Stephen King's novel, and integrates elements from the 1976 film.

The musical focuses on Carrie White, an awkward teenage girl with telekinetic powers, whose lonely life is dominated by her oppressive religious fanatic mother, Margaret. When she is humiliated by her classmates at the high school prom, she unleashes chaos on everyone and everything in her path out of vengeance.

Co-produced with the Royal Shakespeare Company, with direction by Terry Hands and choreography by Debbie Allen, the original production of Carrie premiered on Broadway at the Virginia Theatre in April 1988, after completing pre-Broadway tryouts in the United Kingdom at Stratford-upon-Avon's Royal Shakespeare Theatre in February and March of that year. Its original stars included Linzi Hateley as the title character, Sally Ann Triplett as Sue Snell, Charlotte d'Amboise as Chris Hargensen, Gene Anthony Ray as Billy Nolan, and Darlene Love as Miss Lynn Gardner. Barbara Cook played Margaret during the tryouts, but was replaced by Betty Buckley for the Broadway run following Cook's resignation after a technical accident.

The show received mostly negative reviews and closed after 16 previews and five regular performances in Broadway. With a budget of $8 million, it is considered one of the most notable and expensive failures in Broadway theatre history. Its reputation, the story behind its difficult production, and its limited run created a passionate response from fans, with the show gaining a cult following. The original production's legacy continued in several unofficial productions at Emerson College, Gammel Hellerup Gymnasium, and Stagedoor Manor. A 1991 book written by Ken Mandelbaum, which chronicled the history of flop Broadway musicals, was entitled Not Since Carrie, and a 2021 podcast and subsequent 2023 book, Out for Blood, documented its creation and development.

An Off-Broadway revival premiered in 2012 at the Lucille Lortel Theatre, with the book and score almost entirely revised by Cohen, Pitchford, and Gore. The show removed most of the exaggerated and playful style from the original and focused on transforming the musical into a psychological-drama. The revival received better reviews than the original production, although some described it as dull. It became the official version of the show, and opened the rights for licensing the following year. The 2015 Off-West End and Los Angeles production followed after the 2012 revival, both receiving positive reviews. "Chapter Thirty-One: A Night to Remember", a second season musical episode of Riverdale centered around the musical and using the revival versions of the songs, aired on The CW in 2018.

== Characters ==
Character	Description
Carrie White	The main character, Carrie White is a shy outcast often bullied by her classmates. While showering after gym class, Carrie has her first period, for which the other girls tease her. This event sparks the emergence of Carrie's telekinetic powers, which she ultimately uses for revenge after being cruelly pranked at the prom. Suffering a breakdown after being doused in pig's blood, Carrie sets the school ablaze, killing her entire class and teachers, only to come home to be fatally stabbed by her mother Margaret. Carrie uses her powers to kill Margaret, dying shortly afterwards and comforted by Sue.
Margaret White	One of the main antagonists. Carrie's overprotective and abusive mother, Margaret is a religious zealot. Although she loves Carrie and wants to protect her from the world, especially from the school, her fanaticism often drives her to isolate and abuse her daughter. After Carrie develops telekinesis and goes to the prom against her wishes, Margaret comes to believe that killing Carrie is a sacrifice and that is the only way to save her from damnation. Carrie uses her powers to stop Margaret's heart in retaliation after being stabbed by her.
Sue Snell	One of the most popular girls at school, Sue initially teases Carrie like the other girls, but later feels remorse. In an attempt for redemption, she asks her boyfriend, Tommy Ross, to take Carrie to prom instead of her. Sue goes to the prom to see how things go, but when she realizes that Carrie is in trouble, she goes to Miss Lynn Gardner for help. However, Miss Gardner ejects Sue, thinking that she is trying to humiliate Carrie, and she is thus spared from Carrie's subsequent massacre. Sue witnesses Carrie's breakdown and, when she finally finds Carrie, comforts her during her last moments, having forgiven her.
Tommy Ross	Carrie's version of Prince Charming. At first, Tommy takes no interest in Carrie but takes her to the prom after his girlfriend, Sue, asks him to. Tommy is apprehensive but soon finds himself wanting to become friends with Carrie. Although ignorant of the prank Chris has planned for Carrie, he dies alongside the rest of the students when Carrie takes her revenge at the prom.
Chris Hargensen	One of the main antagonists. Chris hates Carrie, bullying her at every opportunity. She leads the other girls in throwing tampons at Carrie after she has her first period, and feels no remorse after the fact. After Chris is banned from the prom as punishment for bullying Carrie, she vows revenge. She comes up with the idea of dumping a bucket of pig's blood on Carrie at the prom. Chris dies during Carrie's revenge; in the 2012 off-Broadway revival, she is forced to choke herself to death.
Billy Nolan	The "not-so-smart" boyfriend of Chris. Although not a student, he plans to take Chris to prom until Chris is forbidden from attending the event. He kills a pig for Chris and harvests its blood in order to prank Carrie. He is killed during Carrie's breakdown.
Miss Lynn Gardner	Carrie's "Fairy Godmother". She is initially disgusted by the shower incident but soon realizes that Carrie is completely oblivious to her body's changing. She explains menstruation and helps Carrie develop her self-esteem, giving her the courage to accept Tommy's invitation to prom. While pleased to see Carrie happy at the prom, she is still killed in Carrie's destructive rampage.
Mr. Stephens	Late-30s, this well-intentioned English teacher and guidance counselor struggles to help his students realize their potential. A dedicated educator, he's stretched thin in his duties, woefully underpaid, and a bit overwhelmed as to how to handle the Billy Nolans of the classroom zone. He dies at the hands of Carrie's wrath.

== Plot ==
=== 1988 production ===
Act I

Opening in a high school gym, the gym teacher, Miss Lynn Gardner, is leading her girls' gym class in a strenuous workout ("In"). After class, the girls head to the locker room and have fun teasing a less attractive, plump girl named Carrie White.

The girls start to shower while talking about boys and their plans for the upcoming prom ("Dream On"). Carrie has her first period in the shower and, not understanding what is happening, thinks she is bleeding to death. The other girls taunt her mercilessly until Miss Gardner hears the commotion, and slaps Carrie to end the frenzy, causing her to break a lightbulb overhead with telekinesis. Miss Gardner sends the girls away, and explains menstruation to Carrie before sending her home.

On the way out of the gym, Sue Snell and Chris Hargensen talk about what just happened in the locker room. Sue expresses guilt for tormenting Carrie, but Chris mocks her and continues to insult Carrie. Carrie is hurt by their name-calling and teasing, but dreams of being vindicated and gaining respect from her peers ("Carrie"). Carrie's mother Margaret is fervently praying ("Open Your Heart") when Carrie arrives home. As she recounts the incident, Margaret, believing it to be a sign of sin, condemns Carrie and forces her into the cellar to pray for forgiveness ("And Eve Was Weak").

That night, many of the high school students are at the drive-in theater, including Sue and her boyfriend Tommy Ross and Chris and her boyfriend Billy Nolan. Sue tells Tommy that she is still upset about what she and the other girls did to Carrie in the locker room, while Chris complains about Carrie to Billy ("Don't Waste the Moon"). At home, Carrie and Margaret pray separately, with Carrie seeking comfort and Margaret strength to protect her daughter. Margaret apologizes for hurting Carrie and assures that she loves her unconditionally ("Evening Prayers").

The next day, Miss Gardner orders the girls to apologize to Carrie. Sue complies, but Chris refuses, resulting in her prom ban. Enraged, Chris vows revenge. Miss Gardner encourages Carrie to believe she deserves happiness ("Unsuspecting Hearts").

Feeling remorse, Sue asks Tommy to take Carrie to prom instead of her, and he reluctantly agrees ("Do Me a Favor"). At the same time, Chris asks Billy to help her get revenge on Carrie. Tommy later surprises Carrie at her home, asking her to the prom. After initial hesitation, she accepts. When she tells Margaret ("Invited"), Margaret forbids her to go, insisting men only seek to take advantage of girls, including her own father ("I Remember How Those Boys Could Dance"). Carrie reveals her supernatural powers, declaring to her mother that she is determined to attend the prom.

Act II

While at a pig farm during a storm, Chris, Billy, and several of his friends slaughter a pig to collect its blood for their prank, while Billy warns Chris to think about her actions ("Out for Blood"). Back at the high school, preparations are underway for prom night. Sue is faced with resentment from her peers over Carrie attending the prom, but resolves to do what she feels is right ("It Hurts to be Strong").

Carrie joyfully prepares for prom, using her powers to animate her belongings ("I'm Not Alone"). Margaret tries one more time to convince Carrie not to go to the prom ("Carrie II"), but Carrie doesn't listen and leaves for the prom with Tommy. Alone, Margaret laments her past and plans to save Carrie from damnation by sacrificing her ("When There's No One").

At the gym, prom night begins ("Wotta Night"). The students are impressed by Carrie’s transformation. Miss Gardner, serving as chaperone, encourages her to enjoy the evening ("Unsuspecting Hearts (Reprise)"). Carrie hesitates to dance, but Tommy persuades her ("Heaven"). As the votes for Prom King and Queen are cast, the main cast reflects on the night's emotions. Tommy and Carrie are crowned and celebrated as the students salute them ("Alma Mater").

Billy and Chris reveal their prank, dumping a bucket of pig's blood on Carrie. Shocked and humiliated, Carrie rages and unleashes her telekinetic power, closing off the gym exit and killing everyone present, while sparing a horrified Sue ("The Destruction"). Outside, Carrie is greeted by her mother, as Margaret lures Carrie in and sings her to sleep before stabbing her fatally, believing her daughter will be saved from God's wrath. Carrie retaliates with her powers, killing Margaret, then mourns her actions. Sue, the sole survivor and witness, goes to Carrie and comforts her as she dies. As the show ends, Carrie reaches her hand out to the audience, as the lights fade to black ("Carrie III (Finale)").

=== 2012 production ===
Act I

Sue Snell, haunted by the events of her high school years, recalls the night of May 28 as she and her classmates appear in her memory — her boyfriend Tommy Ross, spoiled bully Chris Hargensen, Chris' delinquent boyfriend Billy Nolan, and social outcast Carrie White — each struggling with insecurity and a longing to belong ("In").

After gym class, Carrie experiences her first period in the shower. Frightened and unaware of what’s happening, she cries for help, while the other girls, led by Chris, cruelly taunt her until Miss Lynn Gardner intervenes. At the height of Carrie’s hysteria, an overhead light bulb bursts. Dismissed early, she leaves school humiliated, her classmates mocking her as she goes ("Carrie").

At home, Margaret White listens to an evangelical broadcast while sewing ("Open Your Heart"). When Carrie tells her about the incident, Margaret insists it is a sign of sin and locks her in a closet to pray for forgiveness ("And Eve Was Weak"). Meanwhile at a party, Chris brags about the locker room incident and mocks Carrie, but Sue begins to feel remorse. Chris insists that cruelty is part of life, while Billy supports her behavior ("The World According to Chris"). Disgusted, Sue leaves. At home, Carrie begins to sense strange powers within her and accidentally moves objects with her mind, hinting at her telekinetic power. Margaret releases her from the closet, and the two share a rare moment of tenderness ("Evening Prayers").

In English class, Mr. Stephens praises a poem Tommy has written, and has him recite his work ("Dreamer in Disguise"). When the teacher asks the unruly students for reactions, Carrie volunteers, but is met with ridicule. When Sue later tries to apologize, Carrie mistakes it for mockery and storms off ("Once You See"). Miss Gardner punishes the girls for their cruelty, demanding apologies to Carrie. Chris refuses, hurling insults until she’s suspended and banned from prom, while Sue ends their friendship as she defends Carrie. Despite Carrie's plea to let Chris go to prom, Miss Gardner insists Chris face the consequences, encouraging Carrie to believe that her life can change ("Unsuspecting Hearts").

Guilty and wanting to make amends, Sue convinces Tommy to invite Carrie to prom as an act of kindness. At the same time, Chris plots revenge and enlists Billy’s help ("Do Me a Favor"). Alone in the library, Carrie tests her abilities and learns she can move objects with her mind. Later, Tommy visits Carrie’s home to invite her to prom. When she tells Margaret, her mother forbids it, recalling her own experiences with men ("I Remember How Those Boys Could Dance"). Their argument escalates, and Carrie’s powers close the windows away from the storm outside, terrifying Margaret as Carrie insists she will go to prom and will not be stopped.

Act II

As prom preparations begin, excitement fills the school. Chris and Billy sneak into the gym to set up their cruel prank with a bucket of pig’s blood ("A Night We’ll Never Forget"). Miss Gardner warns Sue and Tommy not to harm Carrie, but Tommy reassures Sue that he understands her intentions, and the two share a moment alone in the gym ("You Shine").

Carrie readies herself for the prom, filled with hope that her life will finally change ("Why Not Me?"). Margaret tries to dissuade her, believing she must protect her daughter from sin ("Stay Here Instead"). When Tommy arrives, Carrie departs, radiant in her prom gown. Left alone, Margaret turns to scripture, convinced that her daughter must be sacrificed ("When There’s No One").

At the gym, students arrive in their finest clothes, buzzing with excitement ("Prom Arrival"). Miss Gardner praises Carrie’s transformation, reminiscing about her own prom ("Unsuspecting Hearts – Reprise"). Tommy convinces Carrie to dance, and the crowd warms up to her as the night unfolds ("Dreamer in Disguise – Reprise"). Hidden above, Chris and Billy prepare their trap while Sue sneaks in and notices Chris' partner-in-crime Norma swapping prom ballots ("Prom Climax").

Tommy and Carrie are crowned Prom King and Queen as the school salutes them ("Alma Mater"). Sue realizes what’s about to happen and tries to warn Miss Gardner, but is pushed out, having been wary of her forgoing her attendance to prom in favor of Carrie. Chris gives the signal, and Billy releases the bucket, drenching Carrie in blood. Laughter erupts, and Carrie’s humiliation ignites her rage. Using her powers, she seals the exits and destroys everything in the gym, killing everyone inside ("The Destruction"). Sue watches helplessly as her classmates die while the school burns down.

Carrie returns home, still covered in blood, and collapses into her mother’s arms ("Carrie – Reprise"). Margaret soothes her, then stabs her, believing she is saving Carrie’s soul. In pain, Carrie stops her mother’s heart with her powers. Sue arrives too late to save her and cradles Carrie as she dies. The fallen students reappear in memory, and they, alongside Sue, offer a final reflection on guilt and forgiveness as the show completes its circle in an "ever repeating nightmare loop" ("Epilogue").

== Musical numbers ==
=== Stratford-upon-Avon ===
Act I

- Prelude – Orchestra
- "In" – Miss Gardner and Girls
- "Dear Lord" – Carrie
- "Dream On" – Sue, Chris, Carrie, and Girls
- "Her Mother Should Have Told Her" – Miss Gardner, Sue
- "Carrie" – Carrie
- "Open Your Heart" – Margaret, Carrie
- "And Eve Was Weak" – Margaret, Carrie
- "Don't Waste the Moon" – Sue, Tommy, Chris, Billy, Boys and Girls
- "Evening Prayers" – Margaret and Carrie
- "Unsuspecting Hearts" – Miss Gardner and Carrie
- "Do Me a Favor" – Sue, Tommy, Chris, Billy, Boys and Girls
- "I Remember How Those Boys Could Dance" – Margaret, Carrie

Act II

- "Crackerjack" – Chris, Billy, Boys
- "Dream On Reprise (The Prom)" – Girls
- "White Star" – Sue
- "I'm Not Alone" – Carrie
- "Carrie II" – Margaret, Carrie
- "When There's No One" – Margaret
- "Wotta Night" – Boys and Girls
- "Unsuspecting Hearts" (Reprise) – Miss Gardner, Carrie
- "Heaven" – Miss Gardner, Sue, Tommy, Chris, Billy, Carrie, Margaret, Boys and Girls
- "Alma Mater" – Boys and Girls
- "The Destruction" – Carrie
- "Carrie III (Finale)" – Margaret

=== Broadway ===
Act I

- Overture – Orchestra
- "In" – Miss Gardner, Girls
- "Dear Lord" – Carrie
- "Dream On" – Sue, Chris, Carrie, Girls
- "Carrie" – Carrie
- "Open Your Heart" – Margaret, Carrie
- "And Eve Was Weak" – Margaret, Carrie
- "Don't Waste the Moon" – Sue, Tommy, Chris, Billy, Boys and Girls
- "Evening Prayers" – Carrie, Margaret
- "Unsuspecting Hearts" – Miss Gardner, Carrie
- "Do Me a Favor" – Sue, Tommy, Chris, Billy, Boys and Girls
- "I Remember How Those Boys Could Dance" – Carrie, Margaret

Act II

- "Out for Blood" – Chris, Billy, Boys
- "It Hurts to Be Strong" – Sue
- "I'm Not Alone" – Carrie
- "Carrie II" - Margaret, Carrie
- "When There's No One" – Margaret
- "Wotta Night!" – Boys and Girls
- "Unsuspecting Hearts (Reprise)" – Miss Gardner, Carrie
- "Heaven" – Tommy, Sue, Miss Gardner, Carrie, Margaret, Boys and Girls
- "Alma Mater" – Miss Gardner, Boys and Girls
- "The Destruction" – Carrie
- "Carrie III (Finale)" – Margaret

=== Off-Broadway revival ===
Act I

- "In" – Ensemble
- "Carrie" – Carrie White
- "Open Your Heart" – Reverend Bliss, Margaret, Carrie, Choir
- "And Eve Was Weak" – Margaret, Carrie
- "The World According to Chris" – Chris, Billy, Sue, Tommy, Kids
- "Evening Prayers" – Carrie, Margaret
- "Dreamer in Disguise" – Tommy
- "Once You See" – Sue
- "Unsuspecting Hearts" – Miss Gardner, Carrie
- "Do Me a Favor" – Sue, Chris, Tommy, Billy, Kids
- "I Remember How Those Boys Could Dance" – Carrie, Margaret

Act II

- "A Night We'll Never Forget" – Carrie, Chris, Billy, Sue, Ensemble
- "You Shine" – Tommy, Sue
- "Why Not Me?" – Carrie, Kids
- "Stay Here Instead" – Margaret, Carrie
- "When There's No One" – Margaret
- "Prom Arrival" – Ensemble
- "Unsuspecting Hearts (Reprise)" – Carrie, Miss Gardner
- "Dreamer in Disguise (Reprise)" — Tommy, Carrie, Ensemble
- "Prom Climax" – Chris, Billy, Carrie, Tommy, Ensemble
- "Alma Mater" – Ensemble
- "The Destruction" – Carrie, Ensemble
- "Carrie (Reprise)" – Margaret
- "Epilogue" – Sue, Ensemble

== Casts ==
Character	Workshop (1984)	Stratford (1988)	Broadway (1988)	Reading (2009)	Off-Broadway Revival (2012)	Seattle (2013)	Los Angeles Revival (2015)	Off-West End (2015)
Carrie White	Annie Golden	Linzi Hateley	Linzi Hateley	Molly Ranson	Molly Ranson	Keaton Whittaker	Emily Lopez	Evelyn Hoskins
Margaret White	Maureen McGovern	Barbara Cook	Betty Buckley	Marin Mazzie	Marin Mazzie	Alice Ripley	Misty Cotton	Kim Criswell
Sue Snell	Laura Dean	Sally Ann Triplett	Sally Ann Triplett	Jennifer Damiano	Christy Altomare	Larissa Schmitz	Kayla Parker	Sarah McNicholas
Tommy Ross	Todd Graff	Paul Gyngell	Paul Gyngell	Matt Doyle	Derek Klena	Kody Bringman	Jon Robert Hall	Greg Miller Burns
Chris Hargensen	Liz Callaway	Charlotte d'Amboise	Charlotte d'Amboise	Diana DeGarmo	Jeanna de Waal	Tessa Archer	Valerie Rose Curiel	Gabriella Williams
Billy Nolan	Peter Neptune	Gene Anthony Ray	Gene Anthony Ray	John Arthur Greene	Ben Thompson	Andrew Brewer	Garrett Marshall	Dex Lee
Miss Gardner	Laurie Beechman	Darlene Love	Darlene Love	Sutton Foster	Carmen Cusack	Kendra Kassebaum	Jenelle Lynn Randall	Jodie Jacobs
Mr. Stephens	does not appear	does not appear	does not appear	Philip Hoffman	Wayne Alan Wilcox	Brian Lange	Bryan Dobson	David Habbin

== Production history ==
Inspired by a 1981 performance of Alban Berg's opera Lulu at the Metropolitan Opera House, Lawrence D. Cohen, who wrote the script for the 1976 film version of Carrie, and Michael Gore began work on a musical based on the Stephen King novel. Gore's Fame collaborator, Dean Pitchford, was brought in to work on the project, which underwent numerous rewrites. In August 1984, a workshop of the first act was staged at 890 Broadway in New York City, with Annie Golden as Carrie White, Maureen McGovern as Margaret White, Laurie Beechman as Miss Lynn Gardner, and Liz Callaway as Chris Hargensen. It was soon announced that Carrie would be produced on Broadway in 1986. Funding was not raised until late 1987.

=== Early productions ===
==== Stratford try-out ====
The show was produced by Friedrich Kurz and the Royal Shakespeare Company and had its first four-week run beginning on February 13, 1988, in Stratford-upon-Avon, England, where it received mixed reviews. Directed by Terry Hands and choreographed by Debbie Allen, the cast included Broadway veteran and cabaret singer Barbara Cook, Charlotte d'Amboise, Gene Anthony Ray, Darlene Love, and Linzi Hateley, in her stage debut, as Carrie. The massive, technically complex production, which was made with the help of designer Ralph Koltai, featured pyrotechnics, lasers, automated scenery, and a gigantic white staircase that would lower from the ceiling for the final scene of the show (with a completely automated lighting rig underneath, which would lower for the final scene to make room for the staircase).

The production was plagued with script and technical problems. The crew was unable to douse Hateley with fake blood without causing her microphone to malfunction. Rewrites continued following each show, and the program cited a song, "Once I Loved a Boy", which had been rewritten and retitled "When There's No One" prior to the first performance. Cook resigned when she was nearly decapitated by an elaborate set piece — the Whites' Living Room, during "Open Your Heart" — on opening night, but she agreed to stay on until a replacement could be cast, which turned out to be the remainder of the show's Stratford run. A musical section of the "Locker Room Scene" (which has come to be known as "Her Mother Should Have Told Her") was removed during the run, then re-added for the 3rd preview performance, and then was dropped permanently. Another song, "White Star", was excised after the Stratford run.

==== 1988 Broadway production ====
The show transferred to Broadway at an expense of $8 million (at the time an exorbitant amount). Hateley (who ultimately won a Theatre World Award) and other members of the UK cast remained with the show, but Cook was replaced by Betty Buckley (who had played the teacher Miss Collins in the 1976 film version).

The show started previews on April 28 at the Virginia Theatre. After the final song, boos were heard mixed in with applause. Ken Mandelbaum is quoted by Wollman, MacDermot, and Trask: "Ken Mandelbaum writes of an audience divided during early previews, the curtain calls of which were greeted with a raucous mix of cheers and boos. However, in an instant, when Linzi Hateley and Betty Buckley rose to take their bows, the entire theatre turned to a standing ovation". According to The New York Times, "the show had received standing ovations at some previews, as well as on opening night..."

The show officially opened on May 12. Hampered by mostly negative reviews, the financial backers pulled their money out of the show, and it closed on May 15 after only 16 previews and 5 performances, guaranteeing its place in Broadway history as one of the most expensive disasters ever. According to The New York Times, the "more-than-$7 million show...was the most expensive quick flop in Broadway history". It is often erroneously reported that the show sold out every night, however this is not true. For the week ending May 1, 1988, capacity was at 78%; for the week ending May 8, 1988, capacity dipped to 74%; and, finally, for the week ending May 15, 1988, capacity was only at 62%. Rocco Landesman of Jujamcyn Theaters, which supported the show, considered it the biggest flop in theatre. Terry Hands claimed Carrie failed due to the lack of preparation and fixing issues within the production.

Frank Rich in his review for The New York Times wrote: "What burning passion is to be found in this Carrie has little to do with teen-age eroticism or Gothic horror." The horror element from the novel and film did not translate to the Broadway stage, where the musical numbers was dubbed as "bubble-gum pop." Stephen King was among the people who enjoyed the performance.

=== 2012 Off-Broadway revival ===
Theater producers and critics were skeptical when the news of Carrie's revival surfaced and considered the production was "unfixable." The creators reworked the musical's book to a psychological-drama and focused on bullying, Margaret and Carrie's relationship, and coming-of-age themes. A reading was held on November 20, 2009, in New York City. The score and book were revised by original composers Michael Gore and Dean Pitchford, and writer Lawrence D. Cohen. The songs "Dream On", "It Hurts to Be Strong", "Don't Waste the Moon", "Heaven", "I'm Not Alone", "Wotta Night" and "Out for Blood" were removed and replaced with new songs. The reading was directed by Stafford Arima and starred Sutton Foster, Marin Mazzie and Molly Ranson.

In October 2010, Carrie was confirmed to be produced Off-Broadway at the Lucille Lortel Theatre by MCC Theater. The director is Stafford Arima with the original creators working on revisions of the show. From May 25 through June 7, a developmental lab was held at MCC, directed by Arima and choreographed by Matt Williams. The initial cast for the revival was announced in May 2011. From the reading held in 2009, Marin Mazzie starred as Margaret White and Molly Ranson as Carrie. Additional cast was announced on November 21. On August 1, a benefit preview of the revival was presented at the Lucille Lortel Theatre. Titled "Revisiting Carrie", the event gave a behind-the-scenes look at the upcoming production with Cohen, Gore and Pitchford. Arima was also present as well. Throughout the evening, Mazzie, Ranson and other cast members, performed song selections from the show.

The Off-Broadway revival received mostly positive reviews. Richard Zoglin in his review for Time wrote: "Carrie tries to turn ordinary, all-too-familiar high school angst into the stuff of tragedy. The show has guts." Other reviewers criticize that the revival lacked the unique qualities that made the original special, such as the decision to use lighting and projection to depict blood splatter instead of splashing red liquid over Carrie.

=== 2015 Off-West End production ===
In early 2015, Paul Taylor-Mills (producer) and Gary Lloyd (director) announced that they were bringing the revamped Carrie to London's Off-West End theatre, the Southwark Playhouse running for a limited season from 1 to 30 May. Casting for this production included Evelyn Hoskins in the title role, Kim Criswell as Margaret White, Sarah McNicholas as Sue Snell, Gabriella Williams as Chris Hargensen, Jodie Jacobs as Miss Gardner, Greg Miller-Burns as Tommy Ross and Dex Lee as Billy Nolan. The production opened to mostly positive reviews, mostly congratulating Hoskins on her performance as Carrie and Criswell as her terrifying mother Margaret.

=== 2015 Los Angeles production ===
On March 18, a new environmental-immersive version of Carrie received its Los Angeles premiere at the La Mirada Theatre for the Performing Arts. Directed by Brady Schwind and choreographed by Lee Martino, the cast for the Los Angeles premiere included Emily Lopez as Carrie White, Misty Cotton as Margaret White, Kayla Parker as Sue Snell, Jon Robert Hall as Tommy Ross, Valerie Rose Curiel as Chris Hargensen, Garrett Marshall as Billy Nolan and Jenelle Lynn Randall as Miss Gardner. The production also featured Tiana Okoye as an alternate for Carrie. She is the first African-American actress to play the part in a mainstream production.

The immersive production featured a further revised book and score and was renamed Carrie the Killer Musical Experience. The lobby of the theater was decorated like a high school building, and the seating area was arranged like bleachers surrounding a school gym. For certain scenes, including the one where Carrie is bullied in the girls’ locker room, the first few rows of the audience are swung into place, creating a "boxed-in", intimate effect on the action.

The production received largely positive reviews, especially for its cast and unique staging concept. Producers Jack W. Batman and Bruce Robert Harris planned a future productions of the staging for additional cities nationwide and internationally. The La Mirada production of Carrie received five 2015 Ovation Award nominations from the L.A. Stage Alliance: Best Production of a Musical, Best Actress: Emily Lopez, Best Actress: Misty Cotton, Best Director: Brady Schwind and Best Scenic Design: Stephen Gifford.

The immersive production of Carrie would return to Los Angeles in October for a limited six-week engagement. The show began performances at the historic Los Angeles Theatre in Downtown Los Angeles on October 1 in advance of an October 8 opening. The majority of the La Mirada cast returned, including all leading and supporting actors.

== Legacy ==
The Broadway show was a flop and even inspired the title of Ken Mandelbaum's 1992 book Not Since Carrie: Forty Years of Broadway Musical Flops. However, it eventually grew in popularity.

Following the original production, there were two unauthorized productions at Emerson College and at Gammel Hellerup Gymnasium in Copenhagen, Denmark in 2001.

There was a performance at Stagedoor Manor in 1999; it was unauthorized at the start. Once the creators of the musical found out, they were horrified, but rather than shutting it down, they embraced it and even came to see the production.

Although there is no official cast recording of the original 1988 production, several bootleg audio tapes were surreptitiously made during live performances in both Stratford and New York, along with video footage shot from the audience, in addition to the professionally made review tape sent to various journalists to promote the show. These recordings began to circulate soon after the show closed, and it was rumored in the early 1990s that there were plans to record an official cast album, though it never happened. However, a cast album of the 2012 Off-Broadway revival was released on September 25.

Carrie received its first licensed US high school production at Albuquerque, Sandia Preparatory School in New Mexico in February 2013. Following this, it received its licensed US collegiate premiere with Macabre Theatre Ensemble in Ithaca, NY in March 2013 directed by Sean Pollock.

Buckley recorded the song "When There's No One" for her 1993 album Children Will Listen (the song also appeared on her 1999 album Betty Buckley's Broadway), and Hateley released the title song on her album Sooner or Later. In 1999, "Unsuspecting Hearts" was recorded by Emily Skinner and Alice Ripley and released on their album of the same name.

Early in the 21st century, playwright Erik Jackson attempted to secure the rights to stage another production of the musical, but his request was denied. Jackson eventually earned the consent of Stephen King to mount a new, officially sanctioned, non-musical production of Carrie, which debuted Off-Broadway in 2006 with drag queen Sherry Vine in the lead role.

Similarly, other unofficial spoofs have been staged over the years, most notably Scarrie! The Musical, Carrie White the Musical and Carrie's Facts of Life, which was a hybrid of Carrie and the American sitcom The Facts of Life.

In 2018, a high school production of the musical is the focus of "Chapter Thirty-One: A Night to Remember" episode of Riverdale's second season. The episode drew inspiration from the 1988 Broadway production and 2012 Off-Broadway production. The Riverdale cast album of the musical was produced via WaterTower Music.

In 2021, a podcast called Out for Blood: The Story of Carrie the Musical examined the show's tumultuous history and legacy in detail, interviewing original cast members and members of the creative team. The podcast was expanded into a book of the same name, published by Methuen Drama in 2023.

== Awards and nominations ==
=== Original Broadway production ===
Year	Award	Category	Nominee	Result
1988	Theatre World Award	Best Broadway Debut	Linzi Hateley	Won
1988	Outer Critics Circle Award	Outstanding Actress in a Musical	Betty Buckley	Nominated

=== 2012 Off-Broadway revival ===
Year	Award	Category	Nominee	Result
2012	Drama Desk Award	Outstanding Revival of a Musical		Nominated
2012	Drama Desk Award	Outstanding Actress in a Musical	Molly Ranson	Nominated
2012	Drama Desk Award	Outstanding Featured Actress in a Musical	Marin Mazzie	Nominated
2012	Drama Desk Award	Outstanding Lighting Design	Kevin Adams	Nominated
2012	Drama Desk Award	Outstanding Sound Design	Jonathan Deans	Nominated
2012	Drama League Award	Distinguished Revival of a Musical		Nominated
2012	Drama League Award	Distinguished Performance	Marin Mazzie	Nominated
2012	Drama League Award	Distinguished Performance	Molly Ranson	Nominated
2012	Outer Critics Circle Award	Best Revival of a Musical (Broadway or Off-Broadway)		Nominated
2012	Outer Critics Circle Award	Outstanding Actress in a Musical	Marin Mazzie	Nominated
2012	Lucille Lortel Award	Outstanding Lead Actress	Molly Ranson	Nominated
2012	Lucille Lortel Award	Outstanding Featured Actress	Marin Mazzie	Nominated
2012	Off-Broadway Alliance Awards	Best Musical Revival		Won

=== 2015 Off-West End production ===
Year	Award	Category	Nominee	Result
2016	WhatsOnStage Awards	Best Off-West End Production		Won
