= The Rage: Carrie 2 =

1999 film by Katt Shea

- Theatrical release poster
- Directed by: Katt Shea
- Written by: Rafael Moreu
- Based on: Characters by Stephen King
- Produced by: Paul Monash
- Starring: Emily Bergl; Jason London; Dylan Bruno; J. Smith-Cameron; Amy Irving
- Cinematography: Donald M. Morgan
- Edited by: Richard Nord
- Music by: Danny B. Harvey
- Production companies: United Artists; Red Bank Films
- Distributed by: United Artists
- Release date: March 12, 1999
- Running time: 105 minutes
- Country: United States
- Language: English
- Budget: $21 million
- Box office: $17.8 million

The Rage: Carrie 2 is a 1999 American supernatural horror film directed by Katt Shea, and starring Emily Bergl in her film debut, along with Jason London, Dylan Bruno, J. Smith-Cameron, and Amy Irving. It is a sequel to the 1976 film Carrie based on the 1974 novel by Stephen King, and serves as the second film in the Carrie franchise. Its plot follows Rachel Lang, the younger half-sister of Carrie White, also suffering with telekinesis, who finds that her best friend Lisa Parker's suicide was spurred by a group of popular male classmates who exploited her for sexual gain.

The film was originally titled The Curse and did not have connections to the Carrie novel or film, but was eventually rewritten to be a direct sequel to the 1976 film. It was shot on location in and around Charlotte, North Carolina in the spring of 1998.

The Rage: Carrie 2 was released on March 12, 1999, and was a box office bomb, grossing $17 million against a $21 million production budget. It received generally negative reviews, which criticized the routine recycling of the original film's story and themes. However, they widely praised the performance of Bergl, who was nominated for a Saturn Award for Best Performance by a Younger Actor for her work on the film at the 26th Saturn Awards. The film has received some retrospective commentary for its themes of rape culture and bullying in high schools.

== Plot ==
In 1989, Barbara Lang claims that her daughter Rachel is possessed, having seen her display telekinesis. Barbara is diagnosed with schizophrenia and institutionalized, while six-year-old Rachel is placed in foster care.

Ten years later, Rachel, now an outcast high school student, lives with her unsympathetic foster parents Boyd and Emilyn. Her only friend Lisa Parker commits suicide by leaping from the school's roof after popular football star Eric Stark dumps her, having exploited her for sex.

While developing Lisa's film, Rachel finds a photograph of her and Eric together. She turns the photo in to the police, explaining Lisa confessed to her that she had recently lost her virginity. Sheriff Kelton and the school's guidance counselor, Sue Snell, pursue statutory rape charges against Eric, who is 18, while Lisa was 16.

Eric and many of his teammates, including Mark Bing and Chuck Potter, are competing to see who can seduce the most girls. Rachel's Basset Hound, Walter, is hit by a car and she flags down a driver, Jesse Ryan, another player on the team. Jesse takes an interest in Rachel, to the chagrin of cheerleader Tracy Campbell, who is pursuing him. Having discovered that Rachel implicated them in Lisa's death, Eric and Mark attempt to scare her into silence by harassing her, but her telekinetic powers frighten them away. Pressured by the players' families, the district attorney covers up the charges against Eric.

Sue begins to suspect Rachel may possess telekinetic powers through their counseling sessions. Sue tracks down Barbara, whose schizophrenia has stabilized over the years, and learns from her that Rachel's father was Ralph White, who was Carrie White’s father. Sue brings Rachel to the ruins of the high school which Carrie destroyed in a telekinetic rage in 1976 after being humiliated at her senior prom. (Note: As depicted in Carrie (1976)) Sue, a peer of Carrie's, is the only survivor of that incident. When Sue discloses that Carrie is Rachel's half-sister, Rachel dismisses her as a liar. Sue later sneaks Barbara out of the institution so that she can inform Rachel of her father's identity.

Mark covertly films a date between Rachel and Jesse, and plans to throw a party at his family's mansion. Monica Jones, a girl in the clique, befriends Rachel and invites her to the party. Rachel goes to the party with Monica, while Tracy takes Jesse, having arranged for his car to be sabotaged. Tracy attempts to seduce Jesse but he rejects her.

At the party, Mark and Chuck humiliate Rachel by projecting the footage of her and Jesse having sex for all the partygoers to see, and saying she is just a name in Jesse's "list of conquests". This triggers Rachel's telekinesis, and she seals the mansion, then causes a large window to explode, killing Chuck and maiming most of the partygoers, and also starting a fire. Sue and Barbara arrive at the party, but a fire-poker impales the front door, which kills Sue.

Monica, Eric, and Mark arm themselves as Rachel pursues them. Rachel makes Monica's glasses implode into her eyes, killing her and causing her to inadvertently castrate Eric with a harpoon, killing him. Mark shoots Rachel with a flare gun and she falls into the swimming pool. When Mark approaches the pool, Rachel pulls him in, triggers the sensor to the automatic pool cover, and leaves him to drown.

Barbara accuses Rachel of being possessed and flees. Jesse and Tracy arrive at the party. Rachel kills Tracy by causing a piece of ceiling to collapse on her. On a balcony, Rachel confronts Jesse about his list, but he denies it. Rachel then notices that the videotape of her and Jesse still playing in the living room captured Jesse saying "I love you" while she slept. As Rachel realizes Jesse's feelings for her are genuine, an awning collapses on her. She throws Jesse off the balcony onto the pool as the fire closes in.

One year later, Jesse, now a student at King's University, cares for Walter. He is visited by a still-living Rachel, but after kissing her, she shatters into pieces, revealing that she died in the fire.

== Cast ==
- Emily Bergl as Rachel Lang, a girl with psychokinetic powers.
  - Kayla Campbell as Young Rachel
- Jason London as Jesse Ryan, a popular and friendly jock with whom Rachel falls in love.
- Dylan Bruno as Mark Bing, the captain of the football team who owns the mansion where the football game after-party takes place.
- J. Smith-Cameron as Barbara Lang, Rachel's biological mother.
- Amy Irving as Sue Snell, the sole survivor of Carrie's rage in the original film, now a guidance counselor.
- Zachery Ty Bryan as Eric Stark, a football player who seduces and then dumps Lisa, resulting in her suicide.
- John Doe as Boyd, Rachel's foster father
- Charlotte Ayanna as Tracy Campbell, a popular cheerleader who is interested in Jesse.
- Rachel Blanchard as Monica Jones, Tracy's best friend.
- Justin Urich as Brad Winter, a football player and Monica's boyfriend.
- Mena Suvari as Lisa Parker, Rachel's best friend who commits suicide.
- Elijah Craig as Chuck Potter, a football player.
- Eddie Kaye Thomas as Arnold, Rachel's friend.
- Clint Jordan as Sheriff Kelton
- Kate Skinner as Emilyn, Rachel's foster mother
- Gordon Clapp as Mr. Stark, Eric's father
- Steven Ford as Coach Walsh
- Deborah Meschan as Deborah, one of Monica's friends who takes part in setting Rachel up
- Katt Shea as the deputy D.A.
- Robert D.Raiford as the senior D.A.
- Rhoda Griffis as Mrs. Porter, a saleswoman
- Sissy Spacek as Carrie White (archival flashbacks): Rachel's deceased older half-sister, and the protagonist of the original film. Spacek turned down an offer to cameo in the film but gave permission to have her scenes used in the form of flashbacks.

== Production ==
=== Development ===
Originally titled The Curse, the film was not developed as a sequel to the 1976 film adaptation and began as an original story. Production was initially scheduled to start in 1996 with Emily Bergl in the lead role; however, production stalled for two years, and the plot was retooled as a Carrie sequel. The plot involving the high school jocks who use a point system to rate their sexual conquests is inspired from a real-life 1993 sex scandal involving a group known as the Spur Posse. The film went into production in 1998 under the title Carrie 2: Say You're Sorry.

A few weeks into production, director Robert Mandel quit over creative differences and Katt Shea took over the reins with less than a week to prepare to start filming, and two weeks' worth of footage to reshoot. Shea was initially hesitant to take over, but was told everyone would be fired and the film would be shelved if she did not.

=== Casting ===
Amy Irving reprised the role of Sue Snell, which she originated in the first Carrie, though she was initially wary of taking the role and asked Brian De Palma, director of the original film, for his blessing. In a 2024 interview, Irving said she and De Palma liked the original director, factoring into her agreement to perform in it. She said "I'm sorry I ever made that film. ... Except they paid me a shitload of money." Director Shea was told that she would not be able to use footage of Sissy Spacek from the original Carrie, but she edited several scenes into the film and presented the film to Spacek, who granted permission for her likeness to be used.

=== Filming ===
The Rage: Carrie 2 was mainly filmed in the Charlotte, North Carolina area, including in a house designed by the iconic architect Gene Leedy. Principal photography began in the spring of 1998.

== Soundtrack ==
The Rage: Carrie 2

Soundtrack album by Various artists
- Released: March 23, 1999
- Length: 55:14
- Label: Edel Records

The accompanying soundtrack album was released on March 23, 1999, by Edel Records.

=== Track listing ===
No.	Title	Performer(s)	Length
1.	"Crazy Little Voices" (Theme from The Rage: Carrie 2)	Ra	4:38
2.	"Quick, Painless and Easy"	Ivy	4:12
3.	"Resurrection"	Fear Factory	6:31
4.	"Year of Summer"	Paradise Lost	4:15
5.	"Low Down"	Mary Watt	4:17
6.	"Looking Down the Barrel"	Five Times Down	3:35
7.	"Die with Me"	Type O Negative	7:13
8.	"Keep Sleeping"	16Volt	3:14
9.	"Dark Love"	Kate Shrock	3:59
10.	"Laughter Lines"	Sack	4:20
11.	"The Slower I Go"	L.A.X.	2:47
12.	"Sleep"	Trailer Park Pam	2:26
13.	"Spark Somebody Up"	Buddha Monk	3:47
Total length:			55:14

== Release ==
The Rage: Carrie 2 was released by United Artists on March 12, 1999 in 2,286 theaters.

=== Home media ===
The film was released on VHS and DVD on October 12, 1999, and Laserdisc on November 9. A Blu-ray version of the film was released on April 14, 2015, in a double feature with the 2002 TV version of Carrie from Scream Factory. This edition went out of print in October 2019. Vinegar Syndrome released the film on 4K UHD Blu-ray through their online web store in July 2025.

== Reception ==
=== Box office ===
The Rage: Carrie 2 opened in second place at the U.S. box office, grossing $7,065,123 that weekend. It grossed a total of $17,762,705 domestically against a $21 million budget, making the film a box office disappointment.

=== Critical response ===
==== Contemporary ====
The film received mostly negative reviews upon its release. Rotten Tomatoes reported the film had a 25% approval rating based on 40 reviews with the consensus: "As disposable as its predecessor is indispensable, The Rage: Carrie 2 mimics the arc of Stephen King's classic story without adding anything of value." On Metacritic, it had a rating of 42 on a scale from 0–100 based on 21 reviews, indicating mixed or average reviews.

Roger Ebert gave the film two out of four stars, deriding its recycling of the plot of the original Carrie and the contrivances employed to make the same plot happen over again, though he briefly credited Bergl for delivering a good performance considering the weakness of the material. Anita Gates of The New York Times characterized it as "an uninspired update" and "typical B-movie making. The actors are attractive and do credible jobs, and in the tradition of the original film, there's one really good scare at the end." Both Ebert and Gates commented on the absurdity of the scene at the high school's ruins, which had not been cleared away despite two decades having passed. Dennis Harvey of Variety panned the film, noting that it "uses the original as a blueprint, but leaves out all the wit, sympathy and bravado." He criticized the recycling of ideas and even footage from the original film, and found the characters all lifeless, particularly compared to their counterparts from the original film.

Ty Burr of Entertainment Weekly gave the film a more favorable B-minus rating. He wrote, "The most satisfying change writer Rafael Moreu (Hackers) and director Katt Shea (Poison Ivy) have made is to their heroine. Where the original Carrie White was a sheltered, cringing wallflower, Rachel Lang (whose relationship to Carrie is a mid-film secret I won’t spoil) is a foster-home Goth grrrl: pale, defiant, seething with surface-level cynicism. She’s the antithesis of the glamorous faux nerd played by Rachael Leigh Cook in She's All That, and newcomer Emily Bergl portrays her with a nicely sulky empathy, equal parts hurt and hope." Kevin Thomas of the Los Angeles Times championed the film as a "well-directed sequel" that treats the supernatural elements as simply obligatory devices while focusing instead on the deep and realistic social drama. He also praised Bergl as demonstrating "exceptional presence and range".

John Kenneth Muir wrote that the abrupt death of Sue Snell was "certainly powerful in terms of shock effect, but it also makes the rest of the film seem incomplete. All the time we invested in Sue goes exactly nowhere and amounts to nothing."

==== Retrospective ====
In retrospective reviews, critics praised the film's depiction of toxic masculinity, with some commenting that the focus on the sexual misconduct committed by the male characters makes the film surprisingly timely, particularly in the wake of the MeToo movement.

Chad Collins, writing for Dread Central praised the film as "eerily, effectively prescient, a grunge-core interrogation of teen bullying, gender roles, and violent masculinity with the resolve to say something of note. While it’s framed by genre expectations—the climactic massacre is appropriately gory, accomplishing everything from severed genitals to CD-ROMs as projectiles—the movie more broadly exploits the rage of an entire generation."

=== Accolades ===
Institution	Year	Category	Recipient(s)	Result	Ref.
Csapnivalo Awards	2000	Golden Slate Award	The Rage: Carrie 2	Nominated	
Fangoria Chainsaw Awards	2000	Best Actress	Emily Bergl	Nominated	
Saturn Awards	2000	Best Performance by a Younger Actor	Emily Bergl	Nominated	
Stinkers Bad Movie Awards	2000	Worst Sequel or Prequel	The Rage: Carrie 2	Won	

== Sources ==
- Jones, Stephen (2001). Creepshows: The Illustrated Stephen King Movie Guide. London, England: Titan Books. ISBN 978-1-840-23309-4.
- Muir, John Kenneth (2011). Horror Films of the 1990s. Jefferson, North Carolina: McFarland & Company. ISBN 978-0-786-44012-2.
- West, Alexandra (2018). The 1990s Teen Horror Cycle: Final Girls and a New Hollywood Formula. Jefferson, North Carolina: McFarland & Company. ISBN 978-1-476-63128-8.
