= Chapter Thirty-One: A Night to Remember =

- Riverdale episode
- Promotional poster
- Episode no.: Season 2 Episode 18
- Directed by: Jason Stone
- Written by: Arabella Anderson; Tessa Leigh Williams
- Based on: Characters by; Archie Comics and; Stephen King; Carrie: The Musical by; Lawrence D. Cohen; Michael Gore
- Cinematography by: Brendan Uegama
- Production code: T13.20818
- Original air date: April 18, 2018
- Running time: 42 minutes

Episode chronology
← Previous "Chapter Thirty: The Noose Tightens"	Next → "Chapter Thirty-Two: Prisoners"

"Chapter Thirty-One: A Night to Remember" is the eighteenth episode of the second season of the American television series Riverdale and the thirty-first episode of the series overall. The episode was directed by Jason Stone and written by Arabella Anderson and Tessa Leigh Williams and choreographed by Heather Laura Gray. It centered around the stage musical Carrie by Lawrence D. Cohen and Michael Gore, which is based on the 1974 book by Stephen King.

The episode was first screened at the PaleyFest LA Spring Season in March 2018. It originally aired on The CW on April 18, 2018, and according to Nielsen Media Research, was watched by 1.10 million viewers.

It is also the first musical episode in the series. It is followed by six other musical episodes in the series, with some of them also based on stage musical: "Chapter Fifty-One: Big Fun" (season 3; on Heathers: The Musical), "Chapter Seventy-Four: Wicked Little Town" (season 4; on Hedwig and the Angry Inch), "Chapter Ninety-One: The Return of the Pussycats" (season 5; on Josie and the Pussycats), "Chapter Ninety-Four: Next to Normal" (season 5; on Next to Normal), "Chapter One Hundred and Twelve: American Psychos" (season 6; on American Psycho: The Musical) and "Chapter One Hundred Thirty-One: Archie the Musical" (season 7; on Archie the Musical).

== Plot ==
Kevin asks Jughead to make a behind the scenes documentary for the school's production of Carrie: The Musical, the students come to school and start to rehearse ("In"), before introducing themselves to the fellow cast members. Betty is still at odds with Veronica and angry that she lied to her. Cheryl then tries to prove that she deserves the role of Carrie ("Carrie"). Afterwards, it is revealed that Kevin got a letter asking for the role of Carrie be recast, but believes it's too small a threat to be the Black Hood. Betty, Veronica, Archie, and Chuck later rehearse ("Do Me a Favor"), and afterwards, Archie asks if he can keep the Firebird at her house as his father is still unaware of it.

Jughead tells Betty about the letter and they believe it might be Ethel, who disputes their claim. Alice visits FP at work, but he seems disinterested in her. Cheryl and Josie rehearse, which causes Cheryl to apologize for her actions ("Unsuspecting Hearts"). During rehearsal ("The World According to Chris"), Betty accuses Veronica of being an embodiment of her character, but later apologizes to her ("You Shine"). Archie and Fred are working on sets for the play when Hiram mentions the Firebird, which upsets Fred. Betty discovers her mother blames herself for kicking Chic out.

Kevin receives another letter telling them to recast Cheryl, which he is about to do when Cheryl's mother tells Cheryl she doesn't have permission, nor the personality to play Carrie. Kevin informs everyone that Carrie was recast, with Midge taking over. Toni goes to comfort Cheryl and encourages her to stand up to her mother. Alice and Midge rehearse ("Stay Here Instead"), but Alice becomes upset and runs off stage, with Betty running after her and comforting her. Archie realizes how much he's hurt his dad and goes to Hiram, telling him not to get in between him and his dad before returning the keys to the Firebird.

On opening night, Betty arranges for Hal to come to the house and he and Alice reunite. Archie buys a beat up car from the junkyard so he and his dad could work on it together, touching Fred. The cast is in the dressing room ("A Night We'll Never Forget") getting ready, while Cheryl goes over to Thistlehouse. Cheryl confronts her mother and threatens to burn the house down, wanting emancipation, the house, and for her and Claudius to leave. FP arrives at the play but leaves after seeing that Alice and Hal made up.

Veronica notes to Chuck how she's noticed his behavior has changed while he's been in the play. Chic enters the dressing room, surprising Betty. As the play starts, Alice begins her part ("Evening Prayers") and cues Midge, who doesn't appear. When the curtain lifts, she's revealed to be pinned against the walls by knives and with a message from the Black Hood. The crowd bursts into screams upon realizing this was not part of the play.

== Cast and characters ==
=== Starring ===
- KJ Apa as Archie Andrews / Tommy Ross
- Lili Reinhart as Betty Cooper / Sue Snell
- Camila Mendes as Veronica Lodge / Chris Hargensen
- Cole Sprouse as Jughead Jones / The Beak
- Marisol Nichols as Hermione Lodge
- Madelaine Petsch as Cheryl Blossom / Carrie White
- Ashleigh Murray as Josie McCoy / Miss Gardner
- Mark Consuelos as Hiram Lodge
- Casey Cott as Kevin Keller
- Skeet Ulrich as F.P. Jones
- Mädchen Amick as Alice Cooper / Margaret White
- Luke Perry as Fred Andrews

=== Guest starring ===
- Nathalie Boltt as Penelope Blossom
- Jordan Calloway as Chuck Clayton / Billy Nolan
- Martin Cummins as Tom Keller
- Hart Denton as Chic
- Vanessa Morgan as Toni Topaz / Norma
- Lochlyn Munro as Hal Cooper
- Shannon Purser as Ethel Muggs / Helen

=== Co-starring ===
- Drew Ray Tanner as Fangs Fogarty
- Emilija Baranac as Midge Klump / Carrie White
- Cody Kearsley as Moose Mason

== Music ==
Riverdale: Special Episode – Carrie: The Musical (Original Television Soundtrack)

Soundtrack album by Riverdale Cast
- Released: April 19, 2018
- Recorded: 2018
- Genre: Soundtrack
- Length: 26:38
- Label: WaterTower Music
- Producers: Leonard Jay Jackson; Ryan Petersen

Riverdale Cast chronology
Season 1 (Original Television Soundtrack) (2017)	''Riverdale: Special Episode – Carrie: The Musical (Original Television Soundtrack)'' (2018)	Season 2 (Original Television Soundtrack) (2018)

Riverdale soundtracks chronology
Season 1 (Original Television Score) (2017)	Carrie: The Musical (2018)	Season 2 (Original Television Soundtrack) (2018)

Carrie soundtracks chronology
Carrie (2013)	Riverdale – Carrie: The Musical (2018)	Carrie (2026–present)

On April 19, 2018, WaterTower Music released the musical soundtrack from "A Night to Remember" episode performed by cast members. A vinyl edition was released at Urban Outfitters stores on July 13. The episode features music from a score of Pino Donaggio's "Bucket of Blood" on the Carrie (1976) soundtrack and Dan Auerbach's "Up on a Mountain of Love" are heard, but not included in the soundtrack.

All tracks from Carrie: The Musical were written by Michael Gore and Dean Pitchford, respectively.

Track listing
No.	Title	Performer(s)	Length
1.	"In"	Riverdale cast	3:18
2.	"Carrie"	Madelaine Petsch	3:18
3.	"Do Me a Favor"	KJ Apa, Lili Reinhart, Camila Mendes and Jordan Calloway	2:52
4.	"Unsuspecting Hearts"	Ashleigh Murray and Madelaine Petsch	2:55
5.	"The World According to Chris"	Camila Mendes, Vanessa Morgan, Shannon Purser and Lili Reinhart	2:07
6.	"The World According to Chris (Reprise)"	Camila Mendes	0:38
7.	"You Shine"	KJ Apa, Lili Reinhart and Camila Mendes	1:55
8.	"You Shine (Reprise)" (Bonus Track)	Vanessa Morgan and Madelaine Petsch	1:46
9.	"Stay Here Instead"	Mädchen Amick and Emilija Baranac	2:08
10.	"A Night We'll Never Forget"	Riverdale cast	2:51
11.	"Evening Prayers"	Mädchen Amick	2:48
Total length:			26:38

== Reception ==
=== Ratings ===
In the United States, the episode received a 0.4/2 percent share among adults between the ages of 18 and 49, meaning that it was seen by 0.4 percent of all households, and 2 percent of all of those watching television at the time of the broadcast. It was watched by 1.10 million viewers.

=== Critical response ===
The review aggregator website Rotten Tomatoes reported a 100% approval rating for the episode, based on 14 reviews, with an average rating of 9.23/10. The website's critical consensus reads: "In "A Night to Remember", an uneven second season comes to a head as Riverdale's first—and hopefully not last—musical episode gloriously weaves the show's many wandering threads back into its central murder-mystery yarn".
