= Rafael Moreu =

American screenwriter

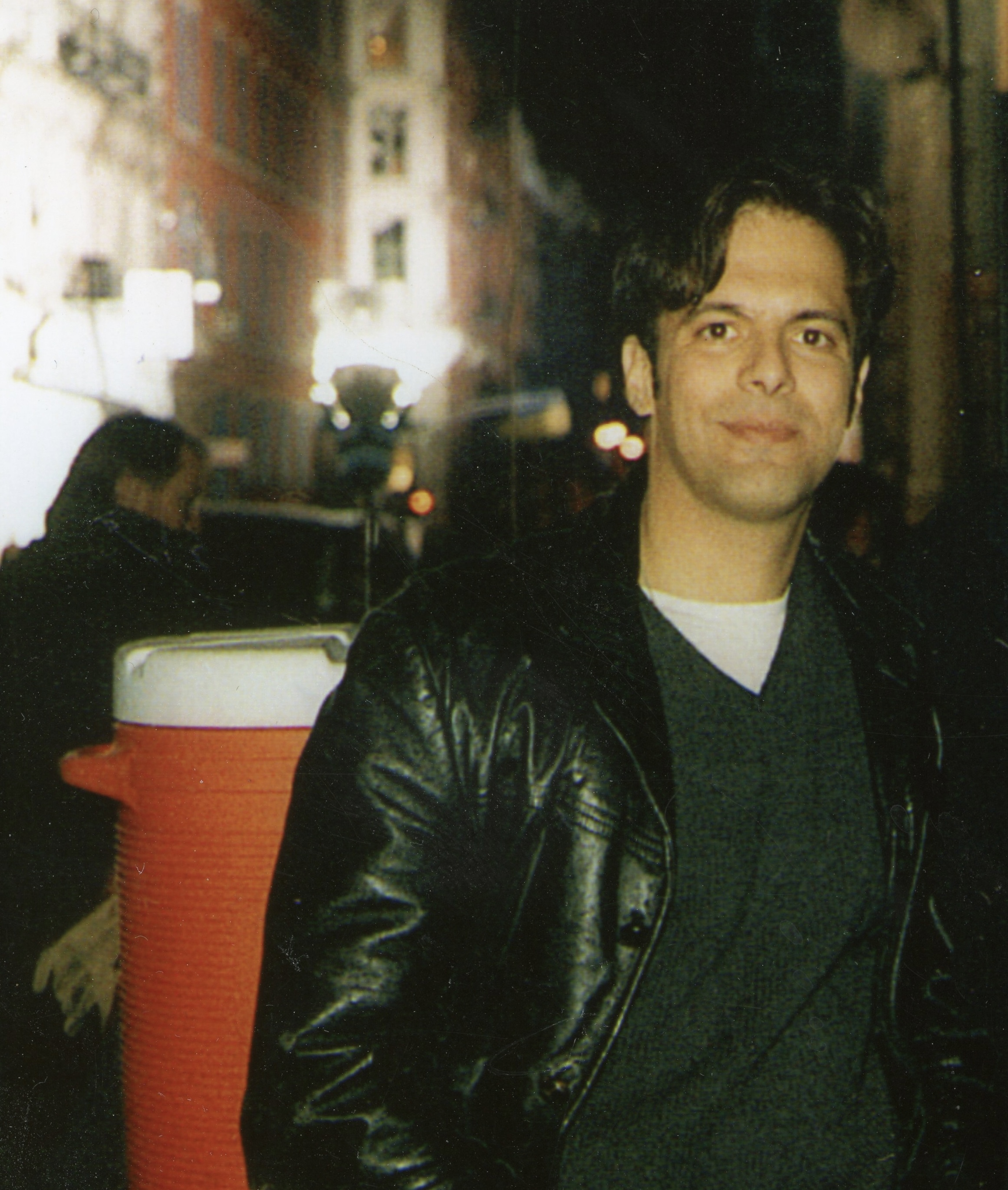
- Moreu in 1994
- Born: 1961 or 1962; Miami, Florida, U.S.
- Died: 2021 (age 58–60)
- Education: New York University
- Occupation: Screenwriter
- Spouse: Kristin Ellingson (m. 1989)

Rafael Moreu (1961 or 1962 – 2021) was an American screenwriter, best known for his work in horror and thrillers.

== Early life ==
Moreu was born in Miami, Florida, to a family who had fled Cuba in the early 1960s. He was a graduate of New York University, where he studied film and met his future wife Kristin Ellingson, whom he married in 1989.

== Career ==
Moreu wrote the movies Hackers (1995) and The Rage: Carrie 2 (1999). For Hackers, he saw the film as more than just about computer hacking but something much larger: "In fact, to call hackers a counterculture makes it sound like they're a transitory thing; I think they're the next step in human evolution." He had been interested in hacking since the early 1980s. After the crackdown in the United States during 1989 and 1990, he decided to write a script about the subculture. For research, Moreu went to a meeting organized by the New York-based hacker magazine 2600: The Hacker Quarterly. There, he met Phiber Optik, a.k.a. Mark Abene, a 22-year-old hacker who spent most of 1994 in prison on hacking charges. Moreu also hung out with other young hackers being harassed by the government and began to figure out how it would translate into a film. He remembered, "One guy was talking about how he'd done some really interesting stuff with a laptop and payphones and that cracked it for me, because it made it cinematic".

The Rage: Carrie 2, which was originally titled The Curse, was initially scheduled to start production in 1996 with Emily Bergl in the lead, but production stalled for two years. The film eventually went into production in 1998 under the title Carrie 2: Say You're Sorry.

== Death ==
Moreu died of COVID-19 in 2021. The CyberHub Trust, a British charity, established a cybersecurity scholarship in his honor. The Academy of Motion Picture Arts and Sciences included Moreu on its list of industry professionals who died in 2021–2022.
