= Margaret White (Carrie) =

Character in the 1974 novel Carrie by Stephen King (Carrie's mom)

- Piper Laurie as Margaret White, with Sissy Spacek as Carrie in the 1976 film adaptation.
- First appearance: Carrie (1974)
- Created by: Stephen King
- Portrayed by: Adult: Piper Laurie (1976 film); Barbara Cook and Betty Buckley (1988 musical); Patricia Clarkson (2002 film); Marin Mazzie (2012 musical); Julianne Moore (2013 film); Samantha Sloyan (2026 television series); Young: Theo Flanagan (2026 television series)

In-universe information
- Gender: Female
- Occupation: Laundromat worker
- Family: Carrie White (daughter); Ralph White (husband); John Brigham (father); Judith Brigham (mother); Harold Allison (stepfather); Sadie Cochran (maternal grandmother)
- Religion: Christianity

Margaret White (née Brigham) is a fictional character created by American author Stephen King in his first published horror novel, Carrie (1974), where she is the main antagonist.

Margaret is an abusive mother to her daughter Carrie, who eventually pushes Carrie beyond her limits. She is a delusional and mentally unstable religious fanatic, who believes everything is a sin to God, especially when related to female anatomy or sexual intercourse, and, more importantly, existence itself.

== Novel ==
In the novel, Margaret is an overweight, unattractive Christian woman who always dresses in shapeless black clothing. She works full-time at a laundromat and has held her job for many years. She often maims herself, or uses various other ways to harm herself, during times of great stress. Once, her daughter Carrie dreamed that Margaret had given herself a hysterectomy after battling the Devil.

She was born Margaret Brigham. Her father was killed in a gun battle and she began attending a fundamentalist church group to deal with the loss, quickly becoming a religious fanatic. Her mother remarried a man named Harold Allison, but Margaret denounced them, believing that they were living in sin.

In 1960, she met her soon-to-be husband, Ralph White. Margaret later tells Carrie she had sex with Ralph before marriage. She wanted to kill herself afterwards and fell down the stairs to induce a miscarriage. After they married, Ralph vowed that their indiscretions would never recur, but one night Ralph tried to seduce Margaret before she threw him out of the house. He returned drunk and had sex with her in a bizarre form of marital rape that Margaret both hated and enjoyed. This resulted in the conception of Carrie. In February 1963, seven months before Carrie's birth, Ralph was killed while working on a construction site (though it is mentioned in the novel that Ralph stopped Margaret from killing the infant Carrie when she started exhibiting her powers early in her life, implying that he died later on. Given Margaret's evident mental health issues, this could also be read as her simply hallucinating Ralph's intervention).

Margaret gave birth to Carrie while in her house without medical assistance, causing Margaret to lose some blood. Her relationship with her daughter was extremely abusive from the time Carrie was a baby. This deeply affected Carrie throughout the years, putting great strain on her by homeschooling her into becoming a part of her fundamentalist community. Whenever Margaret believed that Carrie had sinned at school, she would throw her in a specially decorated closet to pray for forgiveness (out of no fault of her own), usually leaving her there for several hours or even days as a punishment.

Margaret believes that anything or everything can be a sin and harbors extremely restrictive views on sexuality. She feels that only "loose women" develop breasts, or "dirty pillows" as she calls them; she feels that she herself developed breasts due to the way Carrie was conceived. When Carrie has her first menstrual cycle at the age of 16, Margaret refers to it as the 'Curse of Blood' and claims that it was brought on by some sort of sexual sin on Carrie's part. After berating Carrie, Margaret locks her in the "prayer closet" until it is time for bed.

When Carrie is asked to the prom by Tommy Ross, Margaret initially forbids it, but Carrie insists on this last opportunity to fit in and reinforces her demand with her telekinetic power. Once Carrie makes her own dress, Margaret insists that they burn it and pray for forgiveness, disapproving of the fact that it shows cleavage. Carrie then uses her powers to push her mother out of the room.

While waiting for Carrie to come home from the prom, Margaret decides to "kill the sin". She goes so far as to hide a butcher knife beneath the folds of her dress. Once Carrie arrives home, having telekinetically destroyed the high school and everything else in the town after falling victim to a cruel prank, both are surprised to find out that they each intend to kill the other. Margaret stabs Carrie in her shoulder. Carrie kills her mother by telekinetically slowing down her heart to a stop; Margaret recites the Lord's Prayer as she dies.

== Adaptations ==
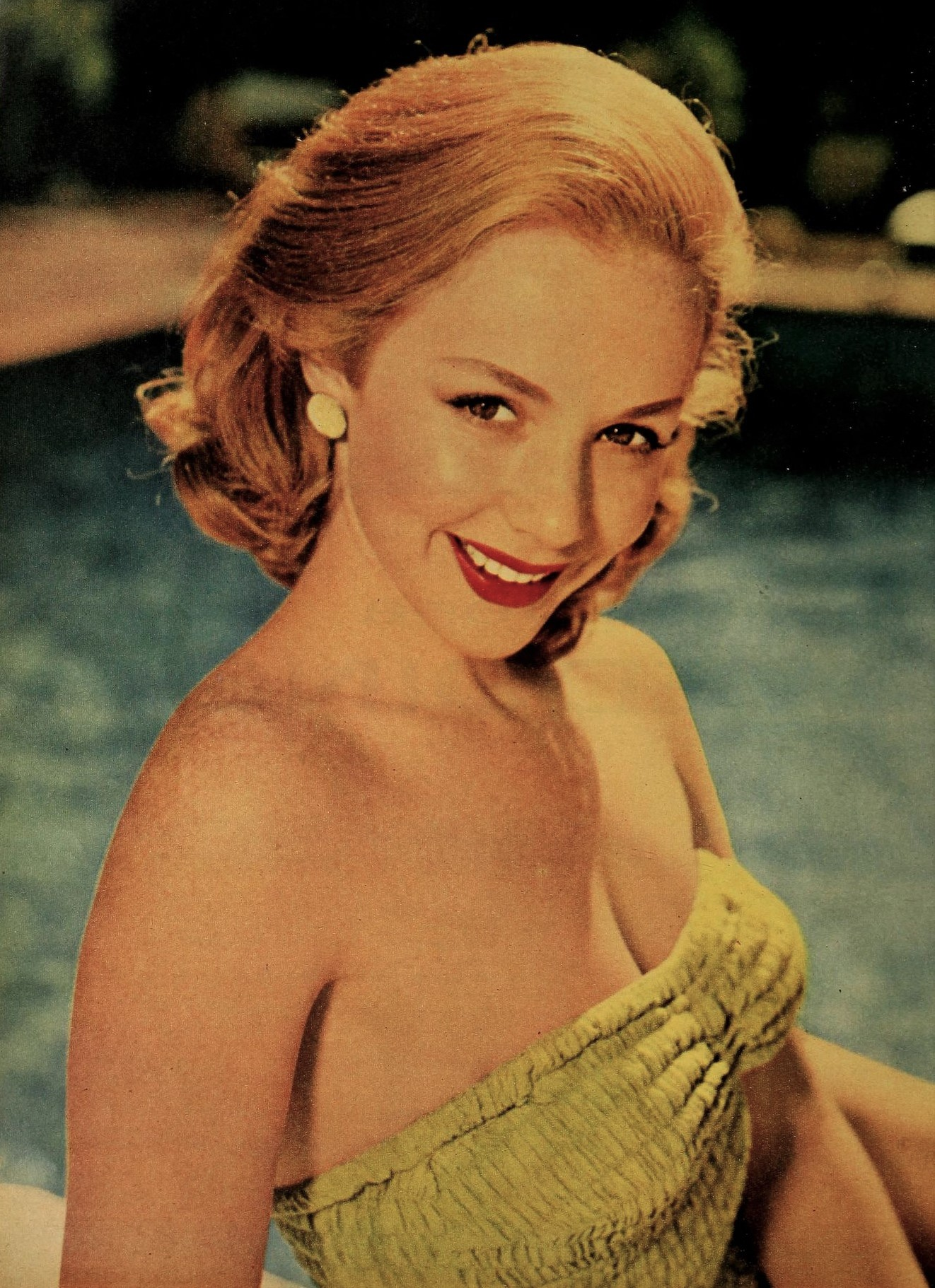
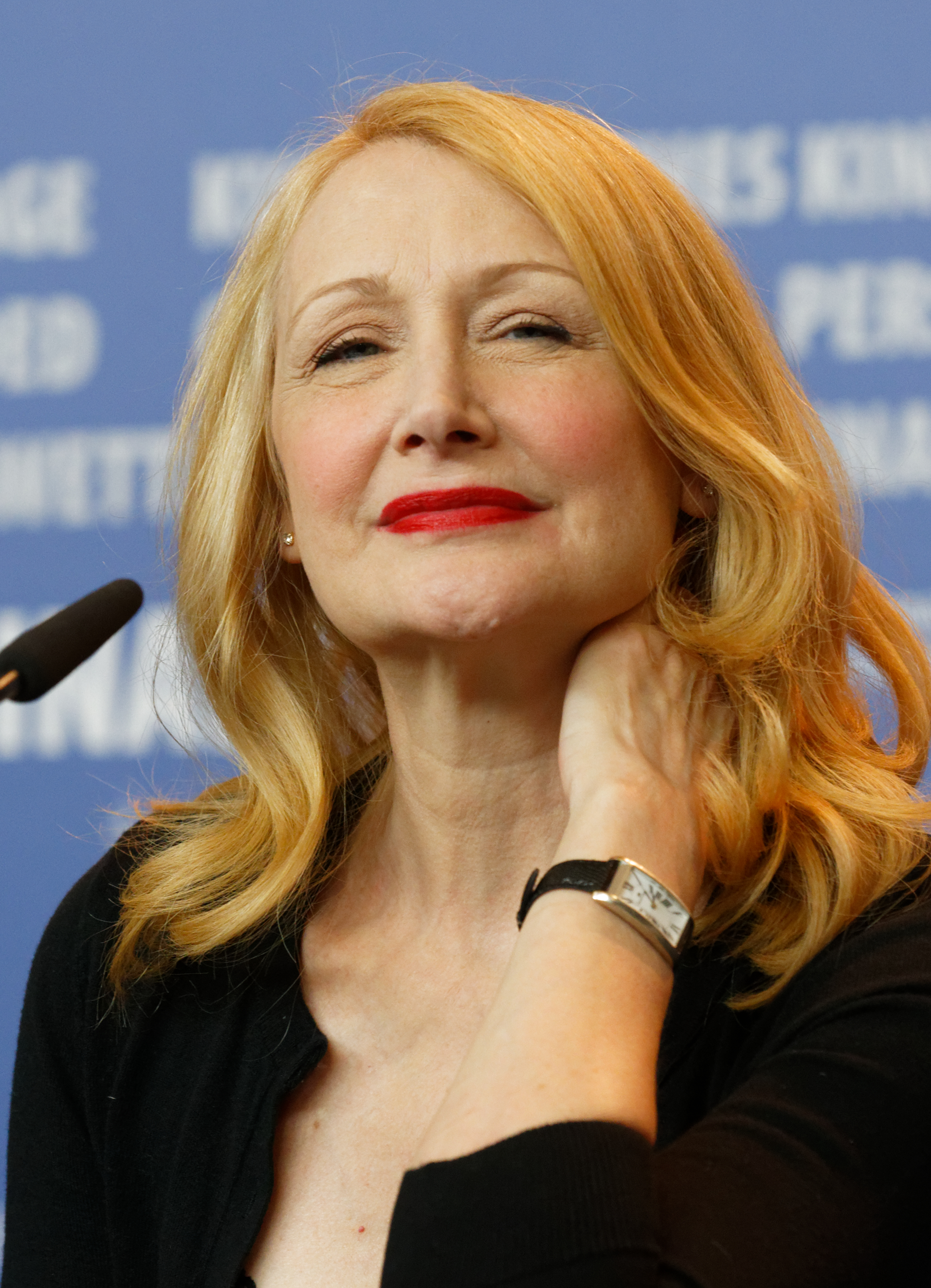
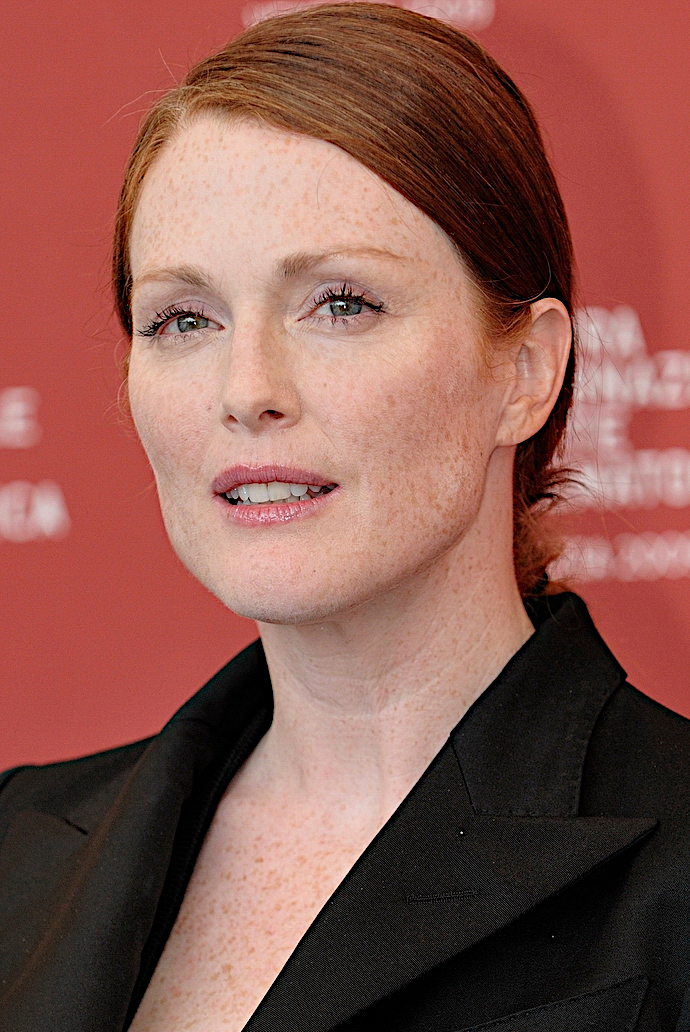
Margaret White was portrayed by Piper Laurie in the 1976 film adaptation, Patricia Clarkson in the 2002 television film, Julianne Moore in the 2013 film adaptation, and Samantha Sloyan in the 2026 television series.

=== 1976 film ===
In the original film adaptation by Brian De Palma, Margaret is portrayed by Piper Laurie. She is portrayed as being more attractive than her character in the novel. She is not overweight, like in the novel, and has wavy auburn hair and fair skin and talks with a slightly southern accent.

Margaret claims that Ralph was carried away by the Devil, but Carrie says that he actually left her for another woman. As in the novel, Margaret reveals that she had sex with Ralph twice: once prior to marriage (after which she wanted to kill herself), and once more after they were married, when he was drunk and raped her, leading to the conception of Carrie.

Upon learning of her daughter's telekinetic abilities, Margaret becomes convinced that Carrie is a witch, and recalls Exodus 22:18 ("Thou shalt not suffer a witch to live"), which she interprets as charging her to purify Carrie by killing her. While Carrie is at the prom, Margaret snaps mentally; she is seen pacing in the kitchen, then beginning to chop a carrot with a butcher knife, and continuing to chop the cutting board even after the carrot rolls away. After Carrie returns home after unleashing her powers at the prom (killing almost everyone there), Margaret, who has lit thousands of candles all over the house, tells her about the night she was conceived by marital rape, then stabs her in the back with the butcher knife while leading her in the Lord's Prayer convincing that Satan has taken control of Carrie. As Carrie tries to crawl away, Margaret makes a cross motion with the knife and stalks her through the house with a delirious look in her eyes. She corners Carrie and raises the knife to strike again, but Carrie telekinetically flings various kitchen elements from the drawers at her, impaling her. Margaret dies in the same pose as the statue of Saint Sebastian in Carrie's "prayer closet".

Laurie's performance in the original film earned her nominations for both the 1976 Academy Award for Best Supporting Actress and the Golden Globe Award for Best Supporting Actress – Motion Picture.

=== Musical ===
In 1988, the property was adapted into a musical co-produced by the Royal Shakespeare Company. Margaret was initially portrayed by Broadway star Barbara Cook. Cook withdrew after three weeks of performances and was replaced when the show transferred to Broadway by Betty Buckley, who had appeared in the original film as Carrie's gym teacher.

In the musical, the character is portrayed as a much more complex and sympathetic character who genuinely loves and wants to "save" her daughter. Margaret even shows remorse after beating and locking Carrie in the prayer closet (cellar in the musical) after the shower incident. Her songs include "Open Your Heart", "And Eve Was Weak", "Evening Prayers", and "I Remember How Those Boys Could Dance" (duets with Linzi Hateley as Carrie) and the solo "When There's No One". The lyrics of the first act finale imply the marital rape described in the novel, as Margaret recalls Carrie's father attempting to seduce her while they were dating, culminating on a night when "he took me and touched me; I tried to fight".

In the finale, Margaret meets Carrie on a shining white staircase descending from above, where she first comforts and then stabs her. Carrie then uses her powers to kill Margaret before crawling to the bottom of the staircase and dying herself.

Buckley recorded the song "When There's No One" for her 1999 album Betty Buckley's Broadway.

Marin Mazzie portrayed Margaret in the revised 2012 Off-Broadway revival of the show, where Margaret's death scene was restaged to be more in line with the original novel's version of events.

=== 2002 television film ===
In the 2002 made-for-TV adaptation, Margaret is portrayed by Patricia Clarkson. She has a calmer disposition than the 1976 version, and is portrayed as a passive-aggressive tyrant. Her past is only briefly hinted at; the film begins with her giving birth to Carrie in bed at home. Her husband isn't mentioned. On prom night, Margaret tries once again to persuade Carrie not to attend, but is sent sliding out the door by Carrie's powers; Carrie warns her to "watch your fingers", preventing her from being harmed physically when the door slams shut. Margaret sneaks out of the closet and spies on her daughter as she leaves in a limo with Tommy, heading for the prom. Following Carrie's return from the massacre, Margaret steps into the bathroom while Carrie is still in the bathtub washing off the pigs' blood. She calls Carrie a witch for destroying the town and tries to drown her in the bathtub while reciting the "bedtime prayer". Carrie then kills Margaret by causing her heart to stop.

=== 2013 film ===
Julianne Moore played Margaret in the 2013 adaptation of the novel. This version of the character is a mix of the 1976, 1988, and 2002 portrayals on account of being extremely abusive, complex and sympathetic, and having a calm demeanor respectively. While it closely resembles Piper Laurie's interpretation in evidence of the character dressing in black, Moore's portrayal of Margaret has her showing genuine love for Carrie and being the proprietor of a tailoring business. The 2013 Margaret also takes her self-harm to a new extreme, breaking her skin using sharp objects and scratching herself until she bleeds. As in the 1976 film, Margaret is pinned to the wall with various objects after she attempts to kill her daughter.

=== 2026 series ===
In June 2025, Deadline Hollywood announced that Samantha Sloyan had been cast to play Margaret in the Amazon Prime Video television adaptation, produced by Mike Flanagan.

== Performers ==
- Piper Laurie (1976; theatrical film)
- Barbara Cook (1988; musical)
- Betty Buckley (1988; musical)
- Patricia Clarkson (2002; television film)
- Marin Mazzie (2012; musical)
- Julianne Moore (2013; theatrical film)
- Mädchen Amick (2018; Riverdale: A Night to Remember (as Alice Cooper)
- Samantha Sloyan (2026; television series)
- Theo Flanagan (young 2026; television series)

== Other media ==
The television series Riverdale, featured an episode based on the musical "Chapter Thirty-One: A Night to Remember", with series star Mädchen Amick, who played Alice Cooper as Margaret.
