= Linzi Hateley =

English stage actress

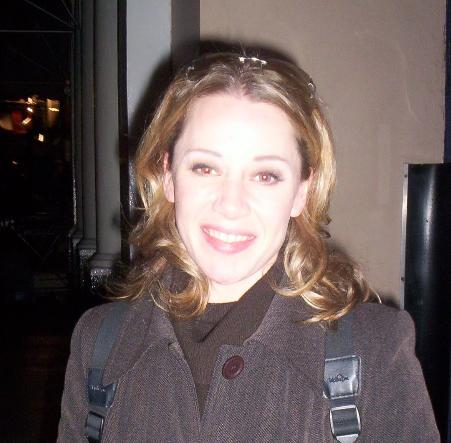
- Hateley in 2005
- Born: Linzi Hateley; 23 October 1970 (age 55); Birmingham, Warwickshire, England
- Education: Italia Conti Academy of Theatre Arts
- Occupations: Actress, singer
- Years active: 1988–present

Linzi Hateley (born 23 October 1970) is an English stage actress. At the age of 21, in 1992, she became one of the youngest nominees for a Laurence Olivier Award for Best Actress in a Musical for her performance as the Narrator in the West End revival of Joseph and the Amazing Technicolor Dreamcoat.

== Early life and acting background ==
Hateley was born in Birmingham. As a child Hateley attended Italia Conti Academy. She appeared as one of the orphans in the stage musical Annie and on television in several episodes of the BBC children's series Grange Hill.

== Acting career ==
Hateley's first starring role, at 17, was as the title character in the ill-fated Carrie - The Musical (1988) in both its Stratford-Upon-Avon and Broadway runs. The musical closed after sixteen previews and five performances with Hateley saying 'It was like a baptism of fire trying to deal with it...trying to be big and brave enough to cope with something that was a flop, ultimately'. Carrie secured its place as one of the most unsuccessful commercial musicals in Broadway history.

Hateley starred in the original London revival production of Joseph and the Amazing Technicolor Dreamcoat as The Narrator (for which she, aged 21 was nominated for a Laurence Olivier Award for Best Actress in a Leading Role in a Musical, becoming one of the youngest nominees for the award).

Hateley was Nancy in Oliver!, Éponine and Madame Thenardier in Les Misérables, Roxie Hart in Chicago, Martha in the original production of The Secret Garden, and Winifred Banks in the original production of Mary Poppins. She also played Donna in Mamma Mia! in the Prince of Wales Theatre, from 2007–2009 and 2010. She reprised this role from on 13 June 2016 in the Novello Theatre.

Hateley has released three solo albums: For The First Time (1992), Sooner or Later (1994), and True Colours (2001).

In 2008 Hateley recorded a song for the CD Act One - Songs From The Musicals Of Alexander S. Bermange - an album of 20 brand new recordings by 26 West End stars, released in November 2008 on Dress Circle Records. In 2012, Hateley appeared in the revival of the National Theatre's production of London Road, as the character Helen. Hateley also had a small role in the Les Misérables film as one of the women in "Turning".

In 2021 Hateley returned to her role as the Narrator in Joseph and the Amazing Technicolor Dreamcoat at the London Palladium followed by a UK tour of the show in 2022. From September 2023 to March 2024 she played Fran Fraser in the world premiere of The Little Big Things at @sohoplace.

In late 2024 and early 2025, she reprised the role of Madame Thenardier in Les Misérables as a part of the Arena Concert World Tour.

In September 2026 it was announced that Hateley will play Mrs Bird in Paddington The Musical. She will perform the part from the 28th of October 2026.
