= Carrie (franchise) =

Franchise of horror novel by Stephen King

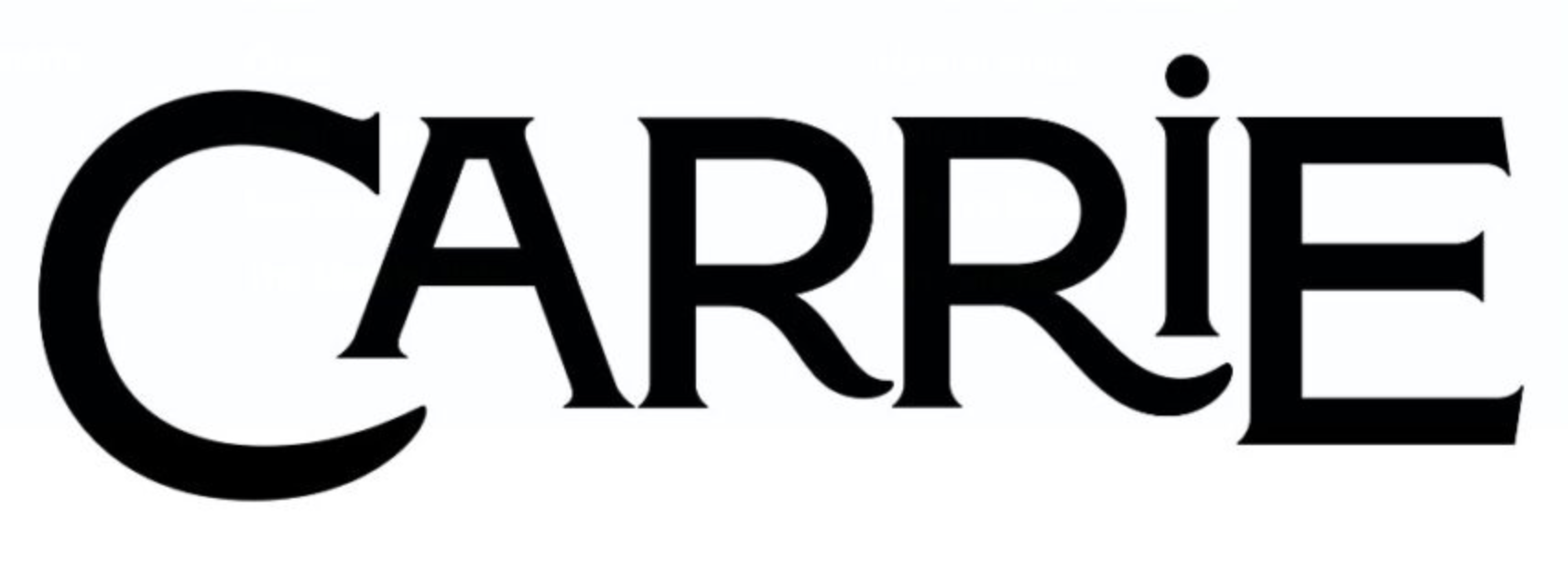
- Logo from the 2026 TV series
- Created by: Stephen King
- Original work: Carrie by Stephen King
- Owner: Metro-Goldwyn-Mayer (Amazon MGM Studios)
- Years: 1974–present

Print publications
- Novel: Carrie (1974)

Films and television
- Films: Carrie (1976); The Rage: Carrie 2 (1999); Carrie (2013)
- Television series: Carrie (2026–present)
- Television film: Carrie (2002)

Theatrical presentations
- Musical: Carrie (1988)

Audio
- Soundtracks: List of soundtracks

Carrie is an American horror media franchise, based on the 1974 novel of the same name by author Stephen King, and owned by Amazon MGM Studios through Metro-Goldwyn-Mayer. It mainly follows Carrie White, a high school girl from an abusive household who has telekinetic powers.

The franchise includes four films and a television series. It also spawned a stage musical adaptation, which in turn, inspired an unofficial parody show, and was the focus of a musical episode of the American television series Riverdale.

The 1976 film and the first season of the television series received positive reviews from critics, while the two other film adaptations received mixed reviews, and the 1999 sequel received negative reviews but later received some retrospective positive commentary for its themes. At the box office, the franchise has generated over $136 million.

== Novel ==
In the novel, which was King's first work, a slightly overweight, shy, and usually bullied girl named Carietta Nadine "Carrie" White is being raised by Margaret, an unstable religious fanatic who thinks almost everything could be sinful. The book describes an odd incident of her exhibiting signs of telekinesis as a child, before focusing on her as a teen in high school; when she gets her first period in the shower, she panics as Margaret never taught her to prepare for having a period. Popular girls Christine "Chris" Hargensen and Susan "Sue" Snell ringlead the other girls to chant "period" and taunt Carrie. A few of the girls even throw tampons, further confusing Carrie, who believes she is dying. The gym teacher, Rita Desjardin, punishes the girls with a week of detention and suspends Chris when she refuses to comply. Desjardin also sends Carrie home with Margaret, believing Carrie should confront her mother about never being taught about a period. Margaret locks Carrie in the "praying closet," as Margaret believes that periods are a symbol of a sexual sin on Carrie's part. However, she lets Carrie out much earlier than she does normally, and Carrie believes it is because her mother knows that Carrie has become aware of her own powers.

Meanwhile, Chris is furious at her suspension and decides to take revenge on Carrie. Sue, however, feels bad about her part in the incident and wants to apologize, but is too nervous to do so. She tells her boyfriend Thomas "Tommy" Ross to ask Carrie to prom, noting that Carrie has a crush on him “like half the girls in the school.” Carrie originally thinks that the invitation was a means of tricking her, but Tommy pleads, and Carrie realizes that his invitation is genuine and accepts. She then sews herself a beautiful white dress to wear to the prom. Meanwhile, Chris and her boyfriend Billy Nolan collect pigs’ blood in a bucket and hang it over the auditorium stage. Chris employs her friend Tina Blake to make fake Prom Queen ballots with Carrie's name on them so that she will be called onstage, where the blood will dump on Carrie and humiliate her. On prom night, Margaret initially forbids Carrie to attend prom, claiming that Tommy and the others will laugh at her, but Carrie is tired of her mother controlling her life and uses her powers to shove her mother into the "praying closet." At prom, the blood is dumped on Carrie, but in the process the bucket falls and hits Tommy on the head, killing him.

Carrie at first flees in sadness, but is soon overtaken by rage and locks the gymnasium doors with her powers and sets the room on fire. She continues to wreak havoc on the scene, killing multiple students and teachers. Leaving a path of destruction in her wake, Carrie returns home, where Margaret tells Carrie that she was conceived in a bizarre instance of marital rape. Margaret then comes to the conclusion that Carrie's powers come from Satan and stabs her with a knife. Carrie telekinetically stops Margaret's heart in an attempt to save herself, but is immediately regretful of this and of all she has done. Carrie attempts to flee, but she is bleeding so heavily from the stab wound that she can barely walk. Sue finds Carrie, and after a brief telepathic conversation, Carrie forgives Sue. Soon after, Carrie dies crying out to her mother.

== Films ==
Carrie films
Film	U.S. release date	Directed by	Screenplay by	Produced by
Carrie	November 3, 1976	Brian De Palma	Lawrence D. Cohen	Paul Monash
The Rage: Carrie 2	March 12, 1999	Katt Shea	Rafael Moreu	Paul Monash
Carrie	October 18, 2013	Kimberly Peirce	Lawrence D. Cohen & Roberto Aguirre-Sacasa	Kevin Misher

=== Carrie (1976) ===
Directed by Brian De Palma from a screenplay written by Lawrence D. Cohen, the film stars Sissy Spacek as Carrie White, a shy teenage girl who is constantly mocked and bullied at her school. She later develops the power of telekinesis and uses it to wreak vengeance on her tormentors. The film also features Piper Laurie, Amy Irving, Nancy Allen, William Katt, P. J. Soles, Betty Buckley, and John Travolta in supporting roles.

=== The Rage: Carrie 2 (1999) ===
A sequel to the 1976 film directed by Katt Shea from a screenplay written by Rafael Moreu, the film stars Emily Bergl as Rachel Lang, the younger half-sister of Carrie White, also suffering with telekinesis, who finds that her best friend Lisa Parker's suicide was spurred by a group of popular male classmates who exploited her for sexual gain.

=== Carrie (2013) ===
A remake of the 1976 film while including some elements from Stephen King's 1974 novel that were not included in the first adaptation. Directed by Kimberly Peirce from a screenplay by Lawrence D. Cohen and Roberto Aguirre-Sacasa, it stars Chloë Grace Moretz as the titular character.

== Television film ==
Carrie television films
Film	U.S. release date	Directed by	Screenplay by	Produced by	Network
Carrie	November 4, 2002	David Carson	Bryan Fuller	David Carson & Stephen Geaghan	NBC

=== Carrie (2002) ===
Written by Bryan Fuller, and directed by David Carson, the film stars Angela Bettis in the leading role. In the story, Carrie White, a shy girl who is harassed by her schoolmates, disappears and a series of flashbacks reveal what has happened to her.

==== Unproduced sequel television series ====
Despite being commissioned as a stand-alone feature by NBC, the 2002 television film was intended as a backdoor pilot for a potential television series by MGM Television and Bryan Fuller. In order to allow for a continuation of the story, the ending of the film was changed so that Carrie White remained alive at the end. The film was developed with the intention of creating a sub-plot for the series, featuring Jasmine Guy as Ruby Moore, a paranormal investigator, but these scenes were ultimately cut.

Angela Bettis and Kandyse McClure were expected to reprise their roles, and Fuller had a concept in mind. The series would feature Carrie and Sue on a journey to help other people with telekinetic powers. Carrie also had to deal with the remorse and the responsibility for killing several people. Fuller wrote the outline for a second episode, but NBC had no interest in it, and MGM ended their deal. In Fuller's opinion, "the network [n]ever intended to do a series, they were just playing the studio".

== Television series ==
Series	Season	Episodes	Originally released	Network	Showrunner	Status
Carrie	1	8	October 7, 2026	Amazon Prime Video	Mike Flanagan	Released
Carrie	2	TBA	TBA	Amazon Prime Video	Mike Flanagan	In development

=== Carrie (2026–present) ===
In October 2024, Amazon MGM Studios announced that they were developing a miniseries adaptation of the novel with American filmmaker Mike Flanagan for Amazon Prime Video. Flanagan had previously written and directed multiple Stephen King adaptations including Gerald's Game (2017), Doctor Sleep (2019) , and The Life of Chuck (2024). Summer H. Howell stars as Carrie White, while Siena Agudong plays Sue Snell. The rest of the cast include Samantha Sloyan as Margaret White, Alison Thornton as Chris Hargensen, Amber Midthunder as Rita Desjardin, Josie Totah as Tina, Arthur Conti as Billy, and Joel Oulette as Tommy Ross. Stephen King also executive produces the series.

Although the serialized series includes differences to the original novel, Flanagan confirmed that core events from the original story like familiar characters were still maintained. The series include characters from the novel who did not appear in previous adaptations, like Principal Grayle or Ralph White, as well as new characters written for the miniseries. To expand the story, Flanagan built out from the book's mythology, using the panicked 911 calls, police reports, newspapers articles, courtroom testimonies and scientific investigations, that were ignored by most of the previous adaptations.

The series premiered on October 7, 2026 on Amazon Prime Video. Despite being originally billed as a miniseries, Flanagan announced that he envisioned Carrie as being a three-season show. Similar to the 2002 television film, the ending of the novel was changed in the series so that Carrie White remained alive at the end to allow for a continuation of the story. In October 2026, the series was renewed for a second season.

== Recurring cast and characters ==
Key
- A dark gray cell indicates the character does not appear.
- An ^{A} indicates an appearance through archival footage.
- A ^{C} indicates the actor portrayed the role in a scene cut from the film.
- A ^{U} indicates an uncredited appearance.
- A ^{Y} indicates the actor portrayed the role of a younger version of the character.
- A ^{V} indicates a voice-only role.

Characters	Films				Television series	Stage	
Characters	Original series		Television film	Remake	Television series	Stage	
Characters	Carrie	The Rage: Carrie 2	Carrie	Carrie	Carrie	Broadway	Off-Broadway Revival
Characters	1976	1999	2002	2013	2026	1988	2012
Characters	Main cast						
Carietta "Carrie" White	Sissy Spacek	Sissy Spacek^{A}	Angela Bettis Jodelle Ferland^{Y}	Chloë Grace Moretz Skyler Wexler^{Y}^{C}^{U}	Summer H. Howell Juliet Rose Foley^{Y}	Linzi Hateley	Molly Ranson
Margaret White (née Brigham)	Piper Laurie	Piper Laurie^{A}	Patricia Clarkson	Julianne Moore	Samantha Sloyan Theo Flanagan^{Y}	Betty Buckley	Marin Mazzie
Susan "Sue" Snell	Amy Irving	Amy Irving	Kandyse McClure	Gabriella Wilde	Siena Agudong	Sally Ann Triplett	Christy Altomare
Miss Rita Desjardin	Betty Buckley (as Miss Collins)		Rena Sofer	Judy Greer	Amber Midthunder	Darlene Love (as Miss Gardner)	Carmen Cusack (as Miss Gardner)
Thomas "Tommy" Ross	William Katt	William Katt^{A}	Tobias Mehler	Ansel Elgort	Joel Oulette	Paul Gyngell	Derek Klena
Christine "Chris" Hargensen	Nancy Allen		Emilie de Ravin	Portia Doubleday	Alison Thornton	Charlotte d'Amboise	Jeanna de Waal
William "Billy" Nolan	John Travolta		Jesse Cadotte	Alex Russell	Arthur Conti	Gene Anthony Ray	Ben Thompson
Norma Watson	P. J. Soles	P. J. Soles^{A}	Meghan Black	Karissa and Katie Strain (as Nicki & Lizzy Watson)			Appears as ensemble
Helen Shyres	Edie McClurg		Chelan Simmons	Mentioned			Appears as ensemble
Tina Blake			Katharine Isabelle	Zoë Belkin	Josie Totah		Appears as ensemble
Rachel Lang		Emily Bergl Kayla Campbell^{Y}					
Jesse Ryan		Jason London					
Supporting characters
Assistant Principal / Principal Peter Morton	Stefan Gierasch	Stefan Gierasch^{A}	Laurie Murdoch	Barry Shabaka Henley	Tim Bagley		
Eleanor Snell	Priscilla Pointer	Priscilla Pointer^{A}	Mentioned	Cynthia Preston	Mapuana Makia		
Mr. Fromm	Sydney Lassick	Sydney Lassick^{A}					
George Dawson	Harry Gold	Harry Gold^{A}		Demetrius Joyette			Appears as ensemble
Freddy Holt The Beak	Doug Cox (as Frank Geen)			Connor Price			Appears as ensemble
Frieda Jason	Noelle North	Noelle North^{A}		Mentioned			Appears as ensemble
Kenny Garson	Rory Stevens		Miles Meadows	Kyle Mac			
Tommy Erbter	Cameron De Palma Betty Buckley^{V}^{U}		Andrew Robb	Tyler Rushton			
Estelle Horan	Tina Romanus^{C}^{U}		Michaela Mann	Vanessa Smythe^{C}^{U}	Naika Toussaint (as Stella Horan)		
Mrs. Horan	Uncredited actress^{C}^{U}		Deborah DeMille	Irene Poole^{C}^{U}	Mentioned		
Jackie Talbot	Michael Talbott (as Freddy DeLois)		Malcolm Scott	Max Topplin			
John Hargensen			Michael Kopsa	Hart Bochner^{U}	Michael Trucco		
Ralph White	Mentioned	Mentioned			Tahmoh Penikett		

== Additional production and crew details ==
Title	Crew/detail					
Title	Composer(s)	Cinematographer	Editor(s)	Production companies	Distribution companies	Running time
Carrie (1976)	Pino Donaggio	Mario Tosi	Paul Hirsch	Red Bank Films	United Artists	98 minutes
The Rage: Carrie 2 (1999)	Danny B. Harvey	Donald M. Morgan	Richard Nord	Red Bank Films	United Artists	105 minutes
Carrie (2002)	Laura Karpman	Victor Goss	Jeremy Presner	Trilogy Entertainment Group MGM Television	NBC	132 minutes
Carrie (2013)	Marco Beltrami	Steve Yedlin	Lee Percy Nancy Richardson	Misher Films Screen Gems Metro-Goldwyn-Mayer Pictures	Sony Pictures Releasing	99 minutes
Carrie (TV series)	The Newton Brothers	Michael Fimognari Michael Wale Maria Rusche	Mike Flanagan Brett W. Bachman	Red Room Pictures Reunion Pacific Entertainment Amazon MGM Studios	Amazon Prime Video	48–59 minutes (per episodes)

== Reception ==
=== Box office performance ===
Film	Year	Box office gross			Budget	Ref.
Film	Year	North America	Other territories	Worldwide	Budget	Ref.
Carrie	1976	$33,800,000	—N/a	$33,800,000	$1.8 million	
The Rage: Carrie 2	1999	$17,762,705	—N/a	$17,762,705	$21 million	
Carrie	2013	$35,266,619	$49,524,059	$84,790,678	$30 million	
Total		$86,829,324	$49,524,059	$136,353,383	$52.8 million	

=== Critical and public response ===
Critical and public response of Carrie films
Film	Rotten Tomatoes	Metacritic	CinemaScore
Carrie (1976)	94% (83 reviews)	86 (21 reviews)	—N/a
The Rage: Carrie 2 (1999)	23% (39 reviews)	42 (21 reviews)	C+
Carrie (2002)	32% (41 reviews)	—N/a	—N/a
Carrie (2013)	51% (184 reviews)	53 (34 reviews)	B−

Critical response of Carrie series
Title	Season	Rotten Tomatoes	Metacritic
Carrie	1	85% (84 reviews)	73 (30 reviews)

== Other media ==
=== Tie-in media ===
A tie-in book edition of the 1974 novel to promote the 2013 film was released by Doubleday on September 24, 2013. Another version for the tie-in edition of the novel was to promote the television miniseries released by Vintage Books on September 29, 2026.

=== Stage adaptation ===
In 1986, a stage adaptation of the novel was announced. Co-produced with the Royal Shakespeare Company, with direction by Terry Hands and choreography by Debbie Allen, the original production completed pre-Broadway tryouts in the United Kingdom at Stratford-upon-Avon's Royal Shakespeare Theatre in February and March 1988 and premiered on Broadway at the Virginia Theatre in April 1988 of that year. Its original stars included Linzi Hateley as the title character, Sally Ann Triplett as Sue Snell, Charlotte d'Amboise as Chris Hargensen, Gene Anthony Ray as Billy Nolan, and Darlene Love as Miss Lynn Gardner. Barbara Cook played Margaret during the tryouts, but was replaced by Betty Buckley, who played Miss Collins in the 1976 film, for the Broadway run following Cook's resignation after a technical accident.

The show received mostly negative reviews and closed after 16 previews and five regular performances in Broadway. It is considered one of the most notable and expensive failures in Broadway theatre history. Its reputation, the story behind its difficult production, and its limited run created a passionate response from fans, with the show gaining a cult following. It inspired a book by Ken Mandelbaum which chronicled the history of flop Broadway musicals, and a 2021 podcast, Out for Blood, which documented its creation and development.

An Off-Broadway revival premiered in 2012 at the Lucille Lortel Theatre, with the book and score almost entirely revised. The revival received better reviews than the original production. It became the official version of the show, and opened the rights for licensing the following year.

==== Carrie: The Musical in Riverdale ====
On April 18, 2018, The CW aired a musical episode of the Archie Comics television series Riverdale, created by Roberto Aguirre-Sacasa who also co-wrote the 2013 film. Titled "Chapter Thirty-One: A Night to Remember", this episode from the series' second season was written by Arabella Anderson and Tessa Leigh Williams and directed by Jason Stone. It follows a high school production of the stage musical adaptation of Carrie and use the revival versions of the songs. A soundtrack album with songs performed by the cast was released after the episode aired.

=== Unofficial stage adaptations ===
The franchise inspired two unofficial stage shows. The first one, Scarrie! The Musical, premiered in 1998 in Illinois and is a parody of both the 1976 film, and the Broadway show. The second, Carrie 2: The Rage (An Unauthorized Musical Parody), premiered in 2017 in Chicago and is a parody of the 1999 sequel.

== Music ==
=== Soundtracks ===
Title	U.S. release date	Length	Performed by	Label
Carrie: Original Motion Picture Soundtrack	1976	36:02	Pino Donaggio	United Artists Records
The Rage: Carrie 2 – Music from and Inspired by the United Artists Motion Picture	March 23, 1999	55:14	Various Artists	Edel Records
Carrie: Music from the NBC Movie Event	2002	43:47	Various Artists	Access Denied Records
Carrie: The Musical (Premiere Cast Recording)	September 25, 2012	1:10:29	Cast of Carrie: The Musical	Ghostlight Records
Carrie: Music from the Motion Picture	October 11, 2013	50:27	Various Artists	Columbia
Carrie: Original Score	October 15, 2013	48:57	Marco Beltrami	Sony Classical
Carrie (Prime Original Series Soundtrack)	October 7, 2026	15:55	The Newton Brothers	Milan

=== Singles ===
Title	U.S. release date	Length	Artist(s)	Label	Title	Ref.
"Slow Motion Memory Fade"	October 1, 2026	2:52	Ruelle	Tone Tree Music	Carrie (2026)	
