= Carrie (TV series) =

2026 television series by Mike Flanagan

- Genre: Supernatural horror; Teen drama
- Based on: Carrie by Stephen King
- Developed by: Mike Flanagan
- Showrunner: Mike Flanagan
- Starring: Summer H. Howell; Samantha Sloyan; Siena Agudong; Alison Thornton; Joel Oulette; Josie Totah; Arthur Conti; Thalia Dudek; Amber Midthunder; Matthew Lillard
- Music by: The Newton Brothers
- Country of origin: United States
- Original language: English
- No. of seasons: 1
- No. of episodes: 8

Production
- Executive producers: Mike Flanagan; Stephen King; Trevor Macy
- Producers: Chad Fitz; Justin Wagman
- Cinematography: Michael Fimognari; Michael Wale; Maria Rusche
- Editors: Mike Flanagan; Brett W. Bachman
- Running time: 48–59 minutes
- Production companies: Red Room Pictures; Reunion Pacific Entertainment; Amazon MGM Studios

Original release
- Network: Amazon Prime Video
- Release: October 7, 2026 – present

Carrie is an American supernatural teen drama television series developed by Mike Flanagan, and produced by Amazon MGM Studios for Amazon Prime Video. The fourth screen adaptation in the Carrie franchise, it is the first serial adaptation of the 1974 novel by Stephen King, and expands the storyline. The series follows Carrie White (Summer H. Howell), a teenage girl who has spent her life in seclusion, as she is forced to adjust to high school following her father's death. She learns to control her mysterious telekinetic powers during the events leading up to her infamous rampage. It also stars Samantha Sloyan, Siena Agudong, Alison Thornton, Joel Oulette, Josie Totah, Arthur Conti, Thalia Dudek, Amber Midthunder, and Matthew Lillard.

Plans for a television series adaptation of the novel started in 2002 with a television film intended as a backdoor pilot by MGM Television but later passed on by NBC. In 2019, a miniseries was in development at FX but was never ordered by the network. Amazon announced a new project's development for Amazon Prime Video in 2024, with Flanagan serving as showrunner, while King joined as an executive producer. It was given a series order in April 2025. Principal photography occurred in Vancouver, Canada, from June to October 2025.

Carrie premiered on October 7, 2026, on Amazon Prime Video. The series received positive reviews from critics, who praised Flanagan's modern take on the source material, themes, and the performances of the cast (particularly Howell and Sloyan), but some were divided over its changes from the novel. Originally billed as a miniseries, the series was renewed for a second season in October 2026.

== Premise ==
Carrie is described as a reimagining of the story of misfit high schooler Carrie White (Summer H. Howell), who has spent her life in seclusion with her domineering mother (Samantha Sloyan). After her father's sudden death, Carrie finds herself contending with the challenges of attending high school, a bullying scandal, and the emergence of mysterious telekinetic powers.

— Deadline Hollywood

== Cast and characters ==
=== Main ===
Kate Siegel, Samantha Sloyan, Mike Flanagan and Summer H. Howell at the world premiere of Carrie during Toronto Film Festival

- Summer H. Howell as Carietta "Carrie" White, a kind but naive and socially inept teenager navigating her new life in high school while learning to control her newfound telekinesis
  - Juliet Rose Foley as young Carrie
- Samantha Sloyan as Margaret White, Carrie's overprotective mother
  - Theo Flanagan as young Margaret
- Siena Agudong as Susan "Sue" Snell, a popular student who experiences remorse for partaking in Carrie's bullying
- Alison Thornton as Christine "Chris" Hargensen, the ringleader of a pack of mean girls who bullies Carrie
- Joel Oulette as Thomas "Tommy" Ross, Sue's goodhearted boyfriend
- Josie Totah as Christina "Tina" Blake, Chris' friend who seeks her approval
- Arthur Conti as William "Billy" Nolan, Chris' juvenile delinquent boyfriend
- Thalia Dudek as Emaline West, Carrie's new friend
- Amber Midthunder as Ms. Rita Desjardin, Carrie's physical education teacher
- Matthew Lillard as Henry Grayle, the principal of Thomas Ewen Consolidated High School

=== Recurring and guest ===
- Kate Siegel as Adelaide, a cult leader
- Michael Trucco as John Hargensen, Chris' lawyer father
- Rahul Kohli as Seth Peist, Carrie's English teacher
- Tim Bagley as Peter Morton, the guidance counselor of Ewen High School
- Tahmoh Penikett as Ralph White, Margaret's husband and Carrie's late father
- Naika Toussaint as Stella Horan, Carrie's friendly neighbor who offers her support
- Crystal Balint as Nancy Piper, a social worker
- Delainey Hayles as Caitlin, a cultist who detects Carrie's presence
- Danielle Klaudt as Joanie
- Heather Graham as Madison Hargensen, Chris' mother and John's ex-wife
- Gil Bellows as Kent Kirby, Madison's new boyfriend and Brooklyn's father
- Mapuana Makia as Eleanor Snell, Sue's mother
- Rowan Danielle as Brooklyn Kirby, Kent's daughter
- Katee Sackhoff as Amanda West, Emaline's mother, and a hunter who seeks to eliminate women with supernatural abilities
- Ruth Codd as Cara, a cultist
- Cassandra Naud as Sable, a cultist
- Olive Abercrombie as Abby
- Tricia Helfer as a parent
- Aaron Douglas as a parent
- Rekha Sharma as a parent

Mark Hamill makes an uncredited cameo in episode 6 as Damon Nostra, a fraudulent psychic.

== Episodes ==
No.	Title	Directed by	Written by	Original release date
1	"First Period"	Mike Flanagan	Mike Flanagan	October 7, 2026
When construction worker Ralph White dies in an accident, social workers conduct a welfare check and find his reclusive, deeply religious wife, Margaret White, and their teenage daughter Carrie, who has never left the family home. As a condition of Margaret retaining custody, Carrie must attend the nearby Thomas Ewen Consolidated High School. On her first day, the homeschooled Carrie befriends Sue Snell but is snubbed by popular rich girl Chris Hargensen. Carrie has a panic attack during an active shooter drill. On her second day, she experiences her first period after P.E class, which distresses her. At Chris' instigation, the other girls throw tampons at Carrie and record her. Their taunts and Carrie's heightened emotions inadvertently invoke her awakening psychic powers, which attract the attention of several cultists, including Caitlin and her leader, Adelaide. Interviews with former classmates and neighbors of the Whites are shown throughout, following a disaster that destroyed the local high school, killed students, and destroyed much of the town, caused by Carrie. Sue tells the interviewers that Carrie was not the only one responsible for what happened that night.
2	"Foreign Language"	Mike Flanagan	Elizabeth Padden	October 7, 2026
Carrie learns about puberty from gym teacher Rita Desjardin and confronts her mother for not telling her about it. Margaret sends Carrie to the prayer closet as punishment for disrespecting her, and Carrie sees the ghost of her father. Chris is accepted into Duke University but learns that she will be unable to attend due to her father's financial problems. She struggles with the separation of her parents John and Madison, as well as Madison's new relationship with Kent Kirby. After Madison warns her not to bully Kent's daughter Brooklyn, whom Chris hates, Chris creates a strawman sock puppet Instagram account called "Carrie Red" to mock Carrie. Carrie befriends Peter Morton, the school guidance counselor, and fellow student Emaline West.
3	"Social Studies"	Kate Siegel	Justina Ireland	October 7, 2026
With Emaline's encouragement, Carrie reads books about telekinesis and telepathy. Chris pretends to apologize and befriend Carrie, inviting her to Sue's party. While Margaret works the night shift as a janitor, Carrie's neighbor Stella Horan drives her to the party. There, Carrie gets drunk for the first time, has fun, and befriends Sue's boyfriend Tommy Ross. A drunken Chris learns from Brooklyn that her parents are divorcing. Tommy brings Carrie home. Chris makes the Carrie Red account public and uploads compromising photos of students and staff, which gains a significant following among the Ewen school population. A horrified Carrie discovers the account.
4	"Dramatic Arts"	Axelle Carolyn	Dani Parker	October 7, 2026
Using the Carrie Red account, Chris sows discord among the students and teachers of Ewen High and seeks solace from her family problems in her delinquent boyfriend Billy Nolan. Meanwhile, Margaret, who wants to stop working night shifts, spreads malicious gossip about her supermarket manager, resulting in the latter facing a suspension for alleged racism. Carrie discovers that Margaret has not collected Ralph's ashes from the crematorium and confronts her. Jealous of all the time Carrie is spending with Sue, Chris invites her and Sue on a social outing with Billy and Tina Blake. Chris and Tina drug Carrie with edibles and take her to the former construction site where Ralph died, wanting to torment Carrie after learning that Ralph's worksite death was what put her father, the owner of the site, in financial difficulty. Carrie falls into the hole her father died in and becomes traumatized after reliving her father's death. Carrie realizes that Chris was manipulating her and reconciles with Margaret, who vows vengeance. After Tina reveals that Chris is behind the Carrie Red account, Sue ends her friendship with Chris.
5	"Physical Education"	Kyra Sedgwick	Elan Gale & Alexandra Magistro	October 7, 2026
Margaret tells Principal Grayle that Chris is behind the Carrie Red account, but her father John refuses to let the school examine Chris' phone. After Chris insults Margaret, Carrie uses telekinesis to break her nose. Emaline encourages her to hone her telekinetic skills and grow into her power. Unwilling to back down, Chris spreads rumors that English teacher Seth Peist is a pedophile, which causes problems for him outside of school. Due to the school's inaction because of a lack of evidence, Margaret escalates by creating her own Instagram account, accusing Chris of being Carrie Red. In retaliation, Chris and Billy break into the Whites' home and tamper with Margaret's surveillance footage. Margaret publicly calls for Chris's expulsion during a parent-teacher meeting. Frustrated by Chris' refusal to take down the account, Sue reports her to Morton with a recording containing Chris's admission to being behind Carrie Red. When Chris posts the stolen surveillance footage of Carrie at home talking to Emaline, it shows that Carrie is talking to herself, making it appear that Emaline had been a hallucination.
6	"Home Economics"	Hiromi Kamata	Rebecca Klingel	October 7, 2026
Grayle confronts Chris with Sue's voice recording. When John sues Ewen High in response, Chris is suspended from school. In retaliation, she posts a photo of Sue buying a pregnancy test kit. Sue admits that she does not see Tommy in her future and the two break up, but remain friends. After Chris exposes Peist's underage relationship with Brooklyn, Peist kills himself, further estranging Chris from her step-relatives. In response to the media circus and community protests calling for Chris' expulsion, Grayle and Morton attempt to broker peace between the girls' families by having Chris apologize to Carrie in return for letting Chris graduate. However, Margaret antagonizes Chris by suggesting that Chris' own mother thinks she is a lost cause, prompting Chris to lash out instead. Following Chris's permanent expulsion, a riot breaks out at the school. Angry with her mother's manipulation towards Chris, Carrie uses her powers for the first time to stop her mother from slapping her, and locks her in the prayer closet.
7	"Romantic Literature"	Mike Flanagan	Jamie Flanagan	October 7, 2026
Following the expulsion of Chris and the student riot, Morton takes responsibility for the ensuing fallout and resigns as guidance counsellor. Peist's death leaves Desjardin conflicted about whether she can continue teaching. Chris moves in with Billy while John is imprisoned for embezzlement. Carrie uses her telekinetic powers to assert control over Margaret, who ceases her online activism. Despairing at losing control over her daughter, Margaret meets Amanda, the mother of an astral projector, who warns her about the existence of super-powered beings known as the "Others" and counsels her to kill Carrie. Tommy invites Carrie to the Senior Prom, which is being debated by the school community to see if it will still be held due to the riot. Though opponents, including Margaret, claim the event would reward delinquent behavior, Carrie convinces the students and their parents to vote in favor of the prom night by presenting it as an opportunity for healing and restoration. Chris, angry about the praise Carrie is receiving for saving prom, conspires with Billy to sabotage the prom night by rigging the prom queen vote in Carrie's favor and pouring pig's blood on her. Tina and Sue separately discover Chris and Billy's plot but both fail to prevent the prank from unfolding.
8	"AP Physics"	Mike Flanagan	Mike Flanagan	October 7, 2026
The interviewer is revealed to be Adelaide, who questions Sue, Tina, and Margaret about the prom night. After Carrie accidentally kills Tommy while trying to stop Chris from escaping, she lets Emaline take over her body. Under Emaline's influence, Carrie kills many of the partygoers and staff – including Grayle and Desjardin – and sets the school ablaze. Amanda attempts to kill Carrie but is stopped by three cultists, which Sue witnesses. Billy and Chris escape and Billy attempts to run Carrie over with his car. Chris tries to prevent it and apologize to Carrie, but Carrie angrily kills them both. Liberated, Carrie and Emaline dance through Chamberlain, wreaking destruction, before Emaline disappears after being shot. Carrie returns home, where Margaret attempts to kill her. Heartbroken, Carrie destroys the house, but Margaret survives by levitating the debris, revealing her own latent telekinesis. Emaline arrives in person to rescue Carrie. Adelaide erases Sue's memories of the cultists and tells Margaret that Carrie is traveling with Emaline, Amanda's daughter, who can astral project. When Margaret rejects her powers, Adelaide deems her useless and telekinetically stops Margaret's heart, killing her. Emaline drives away with Carrie, saying they are friends, but refuses to reveal their destination, fearing Adelaide may be listening. She assures Carrie that the world is hers, and Carrie smiles.

== Production ==
=== Development ===
In December 2022, Mike Flanagan signed a first-look overall TV deal with Amazon Studios. Upon striking the deal, Flanagan immediately tried to launch a televised adaptation of Stephen King's novel series The Dark Tower, a passion project of his he had discussed repeatedly over the years, but Flanagan found the project "one of the most complicated properties to get started" because receiving approval was a much longer and involved process than anything he had ever approached in his life, but then Amazon brought to him the idea to launch their partnership with an adaptation of King's novel Carrie (1974), with Flanagan proposing a new take that excited even King, leading him to assemble his frequent collaborators to do so. In October 2024, it was announced that Flanagan's first project under that deal would be a new adaptation of King's Carrie novel, in the form of an eight episode miniseries, at Amazon Prime Video. A writers' room was launched to flesh out the story. Flanagan had previously helmed adaptations of King's novels including Gerald's Game (2017), Doctor Sleep (2019), and The Life of Chuck (2024). Around this time, Flanagan pitched the DC Universe (DCU) film Clayface (2026) to James Gunn and Peter Safran for DC Studios, which he developed and wrote, but when it came time to start production on it, Flanagan was unavailable to direct it due to his commitments to Carrie and The Exorcist: Martyrs (2027), resulting in James Watkins being hired instead. Flanagan served as writer and showrunner on the series, in addition to directing four episodes. King also executive produces the series. In October 2026, Amazon Prime Video renewed the series for a second season.

=== Writing ===
Due to the original Carrie novel being one of King's shortest books, Flanagan expanded the story to suit a long-form series format. Flanagan acknowledged previous Carrie adaptations, including Brian De Palma's 1976 film and Kimberly Peirce's 2013 film, but instead of revisiting familiar narrative ground, he sought to build something new out of the story's ingredients. He envisioned Carrie as being a three-season show.

Flanagan chose to emphasize the novel's themes of bullying, school violence, and kindness versus cruelty due to society's changing relationship with technology and the increased degree of school violence in the United States in the decades since the novel was published. Teenagers, including Flanagan's son Rigby, were brought into the writers' room in order for Flanagan and his team to better understand contemporary adolescence and high school experiences. Flanagan further built out from the book's mythology and featured the chapters including panicked 911 calls, police reports, courtroom testimonies, and scientific investigations that attempted to explain Carrie's phenomenon, which implied Carrie was part of a sorority of gifted women who had telekinetic powers. Flanagan opted to run with that plot point starting from the first episode, depicting a different, unique story of a different woman somewhere in the world coming to terms with her abilities while Carrie finds her specific place among them over the season.

Unlike previous versions, Flanagan's version of Carrie White has spent her life hidden away at home with her mother Margaret, with the state unaware of their existence until the sudden death of Carrie's father and Margaret's husband Ralph, forcing a spotlight onto their household that prompts Carrie to enter public school for the first time in her life. In addition, he added new aspects to the story's principal characters. Whereas De Palma's Carrie was a "clenched fist who's absolutely shaking out there in the world", Flanagan's Carrie is "wide open", "eager", "curious" and "earnest", walking into her teenage years without any sense of danger but with the innate trust in people and goodness. Instead of portraying Margaret White as the tyrannical parental abuser of King's novel and De Palma's film, Flanagan chose to emphasize Margaret's love for her daughter and need to protect her from the world's dangers. Despite the changes to the original novel, Flanagan confirmed that core events and characters will be maintained, such as Chris Hargensen, Sue Snell, Tommy Ross, Billy Nolan, and Rita Desjardin, as well as the period scene at the bathroom and the Black Prom. A new character introduced in Flanagan's version is Emaline.

=== Casting ===
Summer H. Howell plays the titular role of Carrie.

Over 1,400 actresses auditioned for the lead role of Carrie White in what Flanagan described as one of the biggest casting searches of his career. During auditions, many of the candidates attempted to emulate Sissy Spacek's performance from the 1976 film, despite the production team's desire to avoid similarities. Summer H. Howell submitted a self-tape audition in January 2025, rising to the top due to not being informed by other adaptations of Carrie. Flanagan commented that Howell "playing that earnestness, kindness and eagerness without feeling naive" was what impressed him in her audition tape. Her performance impressed the team so much that she was cast, despite her physical similarities to Spacek at the time. In April 2025, Howell was reported to be in talks to join as Carrie, and that Siena Agudong was cast as Sue Snell. Howell first spoke with Flanagan on April Fools' Day, believing that it was a prank with a fake job offer. In May, Matthew Lillard was in talks to join the series in an undisclosed role and Howell was officially cast as Carrie.

In June, Lillard was confirmed to join the series, alongside Samantha Sloyan, Alison Thornton, Thalia Dudek, Amber Midthunder, Josie Totah, Arthur Conti, Joel Oulette, Kate Siegel, Michael Trucco, Katee Sackhoff, Rahul Kohli, Tim Bagley, Heather Graham, Tahmoh Penikett, Crystal Balint, Danielle Klaudt, Mapuana Makia, Rowan Danielle, Naika Toussaint, Delainey Hayles and Cassandra Naud. Flanagan wrote Margaret's role specifically for Sloyan, deeming it "the part she was born to play." Thalia Dudek also joined the cast as new character Emaline.

=== Filming ===
Principal photography began in Vancouver on June 16, 2025. Eric Hamber Secondary School in Vancouver stood in for Ewen High School. Cloverdale represented the town of Chamberlain with scenes of the town on fire being filmed there in mid-July 2025. Exterior shots of the Whites' house was shot at 821 Henley Street in New Westminster while Sue Snell's house was shot at 206 Queens Avenue in New Westminster. Scenes with Carrie walking home while mailboxes opened behind her were shot on 15th Avenue in Burnaby. Bar scenes featuring Ewen's teachers were filmed at El Camino's on 3250 Main Street in Vancouver. Midway through production, the prom scene in the series' final two episodes was filmed over a two-week block with Flanagan calling the scene "the most difficult sequence of my career" to film. Howell estimated that she spent 12 days covered in blood while filming the scene. Filming concluded on October 25, 2025.

=== Music ===
On July 13, 2026, the Newton Brothers was announced to compose the series. The series soundtrack album was released on October 7, 2026, by Milan Records. Singer Ruelle performed the song "Slow Motion Memory Fade" was released as a single on October 1, 2026. It was featured in the first and last episodes of the series, with an orchestral versions of the song by the Newton Brothers appeared in the soundtrack.

The alt-pop duo Haute and Freddy became the initial musical identity and backbone of the show, and Flanagan even rewrote episode 8 around their song "Shy Girl". Haute and Freddy's nearly entire 2026 album Big Disgrace is used all over the series. Carrie wears their t-shirt in episodes two and three; she admits she doesn't know what it is, and Miss Desjardin replies that they're "a very cool band".

== Release ==
Carrie was released globally with all eight episodes on Amazon Prime Video on October 7, 2026. Before the global release, the series premiered in the "Primetime" program at the 2026 Toronto International Film Festival on September 18.

== Reception ==
=== Critical response ===
The review aggregator website Rotten Tomatoes reported an 85% approval rating, based on 133 reviews, with an average of rated reviews of 7.2/10. The website's critics consensus reads, "Mike Flanagan aptly expands this teen mythos with added compassion and ingenuity, bringing a modern touch to a timeless work and giving all performers involved the opportunity to shine while witnessing the ascension of a fascinatingly new Carrie." Metacritic, which uses a weighted average, assigned a score of 72 out of 100 based on 33 critics, indicating "generally favorable" reviews.

Jordan Williams from Screen Rant praised Flanagan for justifying the miniseries' existence as yet another adaptation of King's first novel despite the existence of de Palma's film due to compellingly transforming King's themes and characters into an even more realized, nuanced portrait of the complex intersection of fear, anger and compassion in society through modernization and expanding on what the book originally showed. Likewise, Judy Berman in Time magazine called Carrie the first worthwhile adaptation of the novel in 50 years as Flanagan makes it relevant to current times with the series representing "a product of the Trump decade".

Nate Richard of Collider noted how many adaptations of King's works are notoriously "hits or misses" on the hands of different auteurs, but Flanagan is an exception and that, in regards to whether the property should be "dead or better", his miniseries proved to be a new take that, while imperfect, was highly addictive and feels more like a remix than a retelling.

Others were more critical of the new additions to the source material. In The Hollywood Reporter, Daniel Fienberg wrote, "Flanagan is extending and over-extending the text in ways that are fairly conventional, but with a story as familiar and previously simple as Carrie, those changes could be interpreted as surprising, if not necessarily creative." He continued, "In the process, some of the engine that steers the property toward its explosive conclusion is lost. Even if you don’t know the story in any version, you know something bad is coming at the prom, but when it comes around, it isn't as disturbing or terrifying as it ought to be."

Emma Stefansky of The Atlantic said "the show is almost too empathetic to its main characters; it doesn't allow them to revel in their spitefulness, as they do in the source material. It treats many of them as victims of larger forces beyond their control—and robs viewers of the catharsis of Carrie's big moment". She concluded, "Defanging Carrie means flinching away from the unforgiving bleakness that makes the story so memorable." In The Times, James Jackson lauded the series' timeliness but commented "an overprotracted finale and various other superfluous additions to the story did make me long for the lean, mean concision of the original film".

=== Audience response ===
Prior to the premiere, some fans expressed disappointment with the show's physical portrayal of the protagonist, citing that no screen adaptation had matched the novel's description, in which Carrie is described as "a chunky girl with pimples". People note that adaptations of Carrie have cast actresses that are conventionally attractive, which some feel goes against King's original interpretation of Carrie. A number of critics and fans expressed their desire to see an adaptation that fully explored Carrie as originally written by King.
