= Lawrence D. Cohen =

American dramatist

- Occupations: Screenwriter, Producer, Playwright
- Known for: Carrie

Lawrence D. Cohen is an American screenwriter and producer, best known for his work on several adaptations of Stephen King's Carrie, including Brian De Palma's 1976 film and Kimberly Peirce's 2013 film.

== Career ==
Carrie was both the first Stephen King novel to be published and the first to be adapted into a feature film. During an interview in 2010, King said he was 26 years old at the time and was paid just $2,500 for the film rights, but added, "I was fortunate to have that happen to my first book." Cohen was hired, and scripted the first draft, which closely followed the novel's intentions. United Artists, the studio behind the film, accepted the second draft but only allocated director De Palma a budget of $1.6 million. Certain scripted scenes were omitted from the final version, due to finance. Several decades later, he would oversee rewrites on the 2013 remake.

Following this Cohen scripted a simplified film adaptation of Peter Straub's novel Ghost Story in 1981. He also adapted two other King novels to television miniseries, the 1990 version of It and the 1993 version of The Tommyknockers. In 2001, he wrote an adaptation of the musical South Pacific. Several new scenes, such as Nellie and Emile's first meeting at the officer's club, were added, and a new character was created to serve as Nellie's best friend and confidante. In 2006, he wrote a segment for the TV series Nightmares & Dreamscapes: From the Stories of Stephen King.

In 1981, Cohen began to work on a musical adaptation of Carrie, which premiered in 1988 on Broadway to negative reviews and closed after only 16 previews and 5 performances. In 2012, the musical was revived Off Broadway for a limited engagement at the Lucille Lortel Theatre (with Cohen revising the book). He appeared in a 2021 documentary film Pennywise: The Story of It.
