= The Tommyknockers (miniseries) =

- Promotional poster
- Based on: The Tommyknockers by Stephen King
- Screenplay by: Lawrence D. Cohen
- Directed by: John Power
- Starring: Jimmy Smits; Marg Helgenberger
- Music by: Christopher Franke
- Original language: English

Production
- Producers: Jayne Bieber; Lawrence D. Cohen
- Cinematography: Dan Burstall; David Eggby
- Editor: Tod Feuerman
- Running time: 181 minutes
- Production companies: The Konigsberg & Sanitsky Company; DawnField Entertainment
- Budget: $12 million

Original release
- Network: ABC
- Release: May 9 – May 10, 1993

The Tommyknockers is a 1993 television science fiction-horror miniseries based on the 1987 novel of the same name by Stephen King. Broadcast on ABC, it was directed by John Power, adapted by Lawrence D. Cohen and stars Marg Helgenberger and Jimmy Smits.

== Plot ==
Bobbi Anderson (Helgenberger), a Western fiction writer, and her boyfriend, Jim "Gard" Gardner (Smits), a poet, live with their dog, Peter, on the outskirts of Haven, Maine. Bobbi suffers from writer's block and Gard is a recovering alcoholic who currently is not writing. One day, Bobbi stumbles over a manmade stone object protruding from the ground. She shows Gard and they begin excavating the object and discover a series of connected cubes made of an unknown alloy. As Bobbi and Gard unearth more of the object, the residents of Haven begin to undergo subtle changes. Insomnia becomes common, along with rudimentary telepathy. Some individuals begin inventing wild gadgets using kitchen tools, batteries, small appliances, and other odds and ends. These inventions have a green glow when active. Gard is astonished when Bobbi's "telepathic typewriter" is able to create a well-written novel about buffalo soldiers. Bobbi also begins to dig compulsively around the artifact, revealing more and more of it. Gard has a metal plate in his head from a skiing accident, and Anderson believes that might be inhibiting whatever is "improving" the others. Even the children start showing changes. A child named Hilly Brown uses his "magic machine" on his brother Davey, which makes Davey disappear.

Sheriff Merrill (Cassidy) leads the town in an unsuccessful search for the child. The search for Davey Brown slackens as the people of Haven, including Davey's parents Bryant (Carradine) and Marie (Corley), become more obsessed with their inventions and become drained of energy and life. Both Hilly, who receives a brain tumor from trying to bring Davey back with his magic machine; and Deputy Becka Paulson (Beasley), who becomes insane after seeing her cheating husband Joe Paulson (De Young) being electrocuted; are hospitalized and recite sayings about the "tommyknockers."

Merrill is still persistent in the search, and discovers Bobbi unearthing the huge object. Hilly's grandfather Ev researches the town's history, uncovering newspaper articles going back more than two centuries documenting inexplicable mass murders, deadly hunting accidents, and even a Native American tribal chief claiming that the area is cursed. Sheriff Merrill now believes that Bobbi had something to do with Davey Brown's disappearance, and almost arrests her. However, when trying to contact Trooper Duggan (Ashton) about the situation, Merrill is assaulted by her dolls and is knocked unconscious. The phone lines die as well, persuading Duggan and two other troopers to investigate. Duggan is shocked by the townspeople's apathy and apparent illness — hair falling out, baggy eyes, pale skin, exhaustion, etc. When he begins to feel nauseated — a sign that he is beginning to be affected — he leaves, and the illness vanishes. The two other troopers get sucked in with Nancy Voss (Lord)'s disintegrator ray (contained in a lipstick) which emits a green light and destroys anything.

Gard, noticing the bizarre circumstances Haven is facing, finds Bobbi standing alongside other townspeople in front of a local town hall, suggesting everyone is possessed by some evil force and is planning to complete their "becoming". He is discovered and attempts to flee, but his vehicle is disabled and a green energy barrier that harms the metal plate in his head prevents him from getting out. Trooper Dugan is killed by the explosion of a vending machine, while Ev is lured by Bryant and Marie into Bobbi's padlocked garage. Gard steals Bobbi's key to get into the locked garage and discovers a large amount of alien technology. He finds Peter the dog, Sheriff Merrill, and Ev Hillman who are all encased in glowing green crystals and are being used to power the alien equipment. Ev is still alive, however, and informs Gard that Davey is "with the tommyknockers", which leads Gard to believe the child is inside the buried alien object.

Gard fakes being a part of the group (including removing his own tooth) and convinces Bobbi that they must descend into the alien object to fully "become". Gard and Bobbi uncover a portal that takes them hundreds of feet into what is obviously an alien starship. They find several mummified aliens as well as an alien strapped to a gigantic wheel-like device. They conclude the alien controlled the ship telepathically, and once linked could not be removed. They also find that the ship is using the mental energy of Davey, who is trapped in a crystal, as power, and Gard realizes that it is also draining the life-force from Bobbi and the others. This realization forces Bobbi to reveal that she experimented on her dog and is killing the boy. The flood of emotion breaks the control over Bobbi's mind, and she and Gard free Davey, with Bobbi taking the boy to the surface. Gard pulls the dead pilot from the control panel, and connects himself to the ship.

On the surface, the other townspeople realize the ship is active and begin to run to the excavation site. Bobbi and Davey exit the ship and run into the woods. Aboard the buried craft, Gard destroys the external portal controls, preventing anyone from entering the ship. Bryant Brown is killed as a result of an unsuccessful attempt to use a disintegrator rifle on the ship's hull, which enrages Nancy, and she tries to kill Bobbi and Davey before being choked to death by Ev Hillman. Ev dies, but Bobbi is able to save Davey. Below the ground, the alien vessel begins lifting off. Much of the alien technology on the surface explodes, killing several of the townspeople and forcing Bobbi and Davey to flee the garage before they can save Sheriff Merrill. Gard takes the ship high into the sky, where he causes it to explode (just as the aliens start coming back to life). The series closes with Bobbi mourning over Gard's sacrifice.

== Cast ==
- Jimmy Smits as Jim "Gard" Gardner
- Marg Helgenberger as Roberta "Bobbi" Anderson
- E. G. Marshall as Ev Hillman
- Joanna Cassidy as Sheriff Ruth Merrill
- John Ashton as Trooper Butch Dugan
- Allyce Beasley as Deputy Becka Paulson
- Robert Carradine as Bryant Brown
- Annie Corley as Marie Brown
- Cliff DeYoung as Joe Paulson
- Traci Lords as Nancy Voss
- Chuck Henry as Chaz Stewart
- Leon Woods as Hilly Brown
- Paul McIver as Davey Brown
- Yvonne Lawley as Mabel Noyes
- Bill Johnson as Elt Barker
- Karyn Malchus as the main Tommyknocker

== Production ==
=== Writing ===
Lawrence D. Cohen made several "solutions" to the mostly-mixed-reviewed novel in the miniseries screenplay that satisfied King; this included changing the book's original ending where all of the characters died. Another change from the book was done not only because of the Broadcast Standards and Practices, but also for the convenience of a very old E.G. Marshall; instead of the townspeople moving around in fluid while instruments are drilled to their head, the people's minds are controlled by three characters, including Marshall's character, trapped in a crystal.

=== Filming ===
The Tommyknockers faced a very complicated production process. To begin with, ABC required the shooting of The Tommyknockers to be done in or sometime after October 1992 and the entire miniseries completed by May 1993. Since the story was set in an American location during the summertime, filming in the United States was out of the question. Thus, the series was filmed in another country that had many New England-looking areas: New Zealand. Then, in the second day of filming, Lewis Teague was fired as director; his publicist explained that he worked at too slow a pace, while executive producer Frank Koningsberg explained that his vision for how he would direct wouldn't work within the "parameters" of the miniseries.

Then came in the complications of shooting so far from the United States; the producers had to deal with inexperienced New Zealand workers in its 200-member crew, and sending equipment and support people through long distances and customs officials ate up a chunk of the budget. There was one situation where Brian Penikas and Vance Hartwell, who were involved in the production for designing the aliens, had to send 180 pounds of flammable chemicals from the United States to the New Zealand filming location; the chemicals freaked out Singapore officers to the point where they were sent back to America. Penikas and Hartwell had to spend additional money resending the chemicals with tree sap and bark holding them to make the officials feel reassured. The chemicals didn't arrive until the last days of shooting.

Finally adding salt to the wound was a disorderly filming schedule and last-minute re-writes, where halfway in the filming process the script for the second part wasn't even completed. With the help of togetherness of the cast and crew and extra shooting days on weekends, however, The Tommyknockers was successfully shot under the 60-day deadline for post-production to be completed back in the United States. Some of the exterior shots of The Tommyknockers were filmed in the small, quiet country town of Puhoi, while warehouses in Auckland were also used as interiors, such as that of the inside of the spaceship. A fight scene between Gardner and an alien involved the shots of Smits and the alien being done separately and at different times.

=== Effects and visuals ===
The location footage of Puhoi was originally planned to be mixed with matte paintings; however, a 15-square-foot miniature model of Haven built by the crew for five weeks was used due to greater flexibility in angles and lighting. Australian production designer Bernard Hides was responsible for the extraterrestrial aspects of The Tommyknockers's visuals, such as the props and the spaceship; he wanted them to look "organic" and non-technological, particularly the starship to look like a growing "wasp's nest or a huge plant." To achieve this, he used microscopic views of real plants as references.

Alterian, Inc. designed the aliens for The Tommyknockers in Los Angeles; the process was supervised by Tony Gardner and involved Penikas, Hartwell, Loren Gitthens, Chet Zar, and Bill Surgeon. As a Fangoria feature put it, the team were going for a "slim yet graceful" style not seen in other media alien designs, which explains the choice of slender women and dancers (such as ex-ballet-dancer Karyn Malchus as the lead "hero" alien, who also appeared as a creature in a previous 1992 adaptation of King's Sleepwalkers) performing as the aliens. In drawing the concepts, they used elements of dogs, dinosaurs, and barracudas. The final results were tall, silver-tinted blue aliens with reptile-esque heads, large ribcages, and sharp black fingernails. There were a total of four aliens made for the miniseries: three background aliens, and a main "hero" alien that used 24-inch leg extensions for certain shots and a secondary head designed from actress Marg Helgenberger's head. The Helgenberger head model was used for the scene where her character Bobbi turns into a Tommyknocker.

New Zealand effects artist Richard Taylor and his company, the Richard Taylor Modelmakers, created six Neanderthal skeleton models (multiplied in the final cut through bluescreening) and an electric-powered mock design of Petey the dog. They originally planned the dog model to swim underwater, but this was rejected, and the dog sleepwalked in the final cut.

== Reception ==
The miniseries received negative reviews. Tony Scott in Variety described it as "hokey whoop-de-doo" and criticised the writing and the special effects, though he praised the acting. The Toledo Blade praised the "riveting visualization of the novel", calling it "one of the better adaptations of a King novel". In 2014, it was ranked by The New York Observer as the third worst Stephen King miniseries. On Rotten Tomatoes, The Tommyknockers holds an approval rating of 30% based on 23 reviews, with an average rating of 4.50/10. The site's critical consensus reads, "Unlikeable characters, a bloated narrative, and drab scripting make The Tommyknockers a hard watch for even the most die-hard of Stephen King fans." Also, the miniseries has not received any praise from King himself, going so far as to say that "he doesn't care for 1993's The Tommyknockers at all."

== Works cited ==
- Pryor, Ian (June 1993). "Tommyknockers at the Door". Fangoria. No. 123. pp. 46–50.
