= Special effects supervisor =

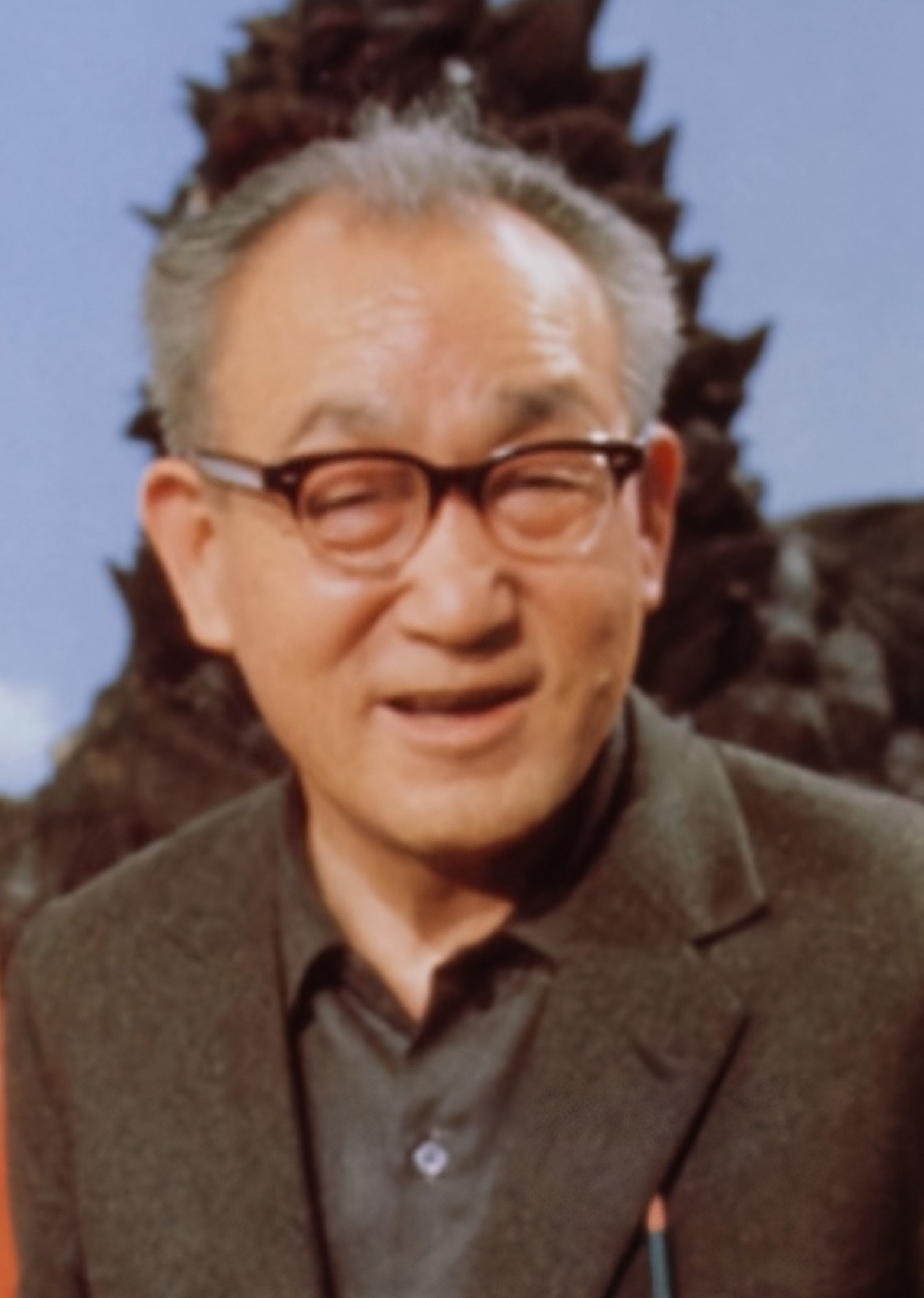
Eiji Tsuburaya, the "Father of Tokusatsu" and co-creator of the Godzilla series, as well as the main creator of the Ultra series.

A special effects supervisor, also referred to as a special effects director, special effects coordinator or SFX supervisor, is an individual who works on a commercial, theater, television or film set creating special effects. They are generally the department head who defers to the film's director and/or producers, and who is in charge of the entire special effects team. Special effects include anything that is manually or mechanically manipulated (also called "practical effects" or in camera effects). This may include the use of mechanized props, special effects makeup, props, scenery, scale models, pyrotechnics and atmospheric effects: creating physical wind, rain, fog, snow, clouds etc.

Special effects (SFX) or (SPFX) are produced on the set, as opposed to those created in post-production which are generally called "visual effects" (VFX). In recent years, physical special effects have been increasingly overshadowed by computer-generated imagery (CGI) effects created in post-production."

Examples of special effects are explosions, car crashes and chases, gunshots, earthquake effects, special makeup, prosthetics, special set construction, snow and rain.

A special effects technician is a person working in the special effects department, under the special effects supervisor, who is responsible for creating and assisting special effects. Movies with many special effects may require many special effects technicians.

== Skills ==
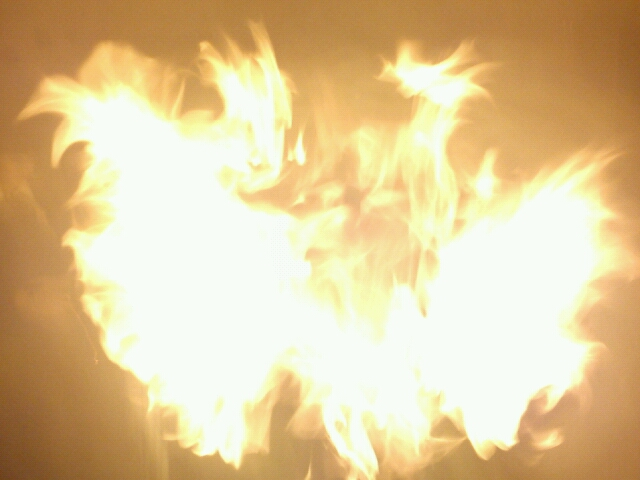
A special effect of a firing methane bubble which looks like a bird.

A special effects supervisor's primary responsibility ensuring the safety of their crew and everyone on set. Knowledge of laws and safety protocols are essential when using explosives, firearms, or any other potentially dangerous devices or materials on a production. Local safety officials may also visit the set and perform inspections before cameras are allowed to roll.

Specific health and safety education programs are recommended for special-effects workers, and specialized training is required for handling explosives, firearms, high voltage, and other hazardous equipment.

On set, the supervisor is in charge of setting up and operating physical effects. Being an effective special-effects supervisor requires creativity, imagination and experience, as they enable the supervisor to determine how effects can be implemented to convincingly render the events in the script. Strong communication, presentation and collaborative skills are also assets.

The head of the special effects team works closely with the production designer and art director. The supervisor plans an effects scene and presents it to the director, hoping it meets the director's vision. Photography experience is also an advantage in a supervisor's work, as it helps them plan such things as camera angles and special filming requirements. Although some courses in special effects are available, the fine points of the craft are often learned by directly assisting and apprenticing to experienced professionals in the course of productions. Many people interested in entering effects work begin learning about it at a young age, and seek whatever opportunities they can to observe and learn from professionals.

=== Education ===
Entry into this career path is competitive. There are various paths that one can take in order to become a special effects supervisor. People with animation, computer science and industrial design backgrounds are often considered primary candidates for effects work. A formal education, particularly in electrical engineering and mechanical engineering, is suggested. Some enter into this profession with degrees in film and television production. Students with fine art or sculpting experience may be well-equipped for special effects careers in modeling, illustration, animation, and other artistic aspects of effects. Experience with computer software and/or hardware (up to and including robotics and animatronics) can also be a particular asset.

Modern special effects tend to be computer generated nowadays, blending physical and digital techniques, so familiarity with computer graphics can also be advantageous for people who work primarily with physical effects. Special effects are a form of science, so courses in chemistry, physics and biology are recommended. Mathematics and finance skills are valuable for such things as effects department budgets, scheduling, and other administrative work. Several years of experience as an effects technician is necessary before one can be considered for senior-level effects roles, such as a supervisor.

== Notable special effects directors ==
- Eiji Tsuburaya
- Douglas Trumbull
- Tom Howard
- John Dykstra
- Ken Pepiot
