= Ken Pepiot =

American special effects supervisor (born 1943)

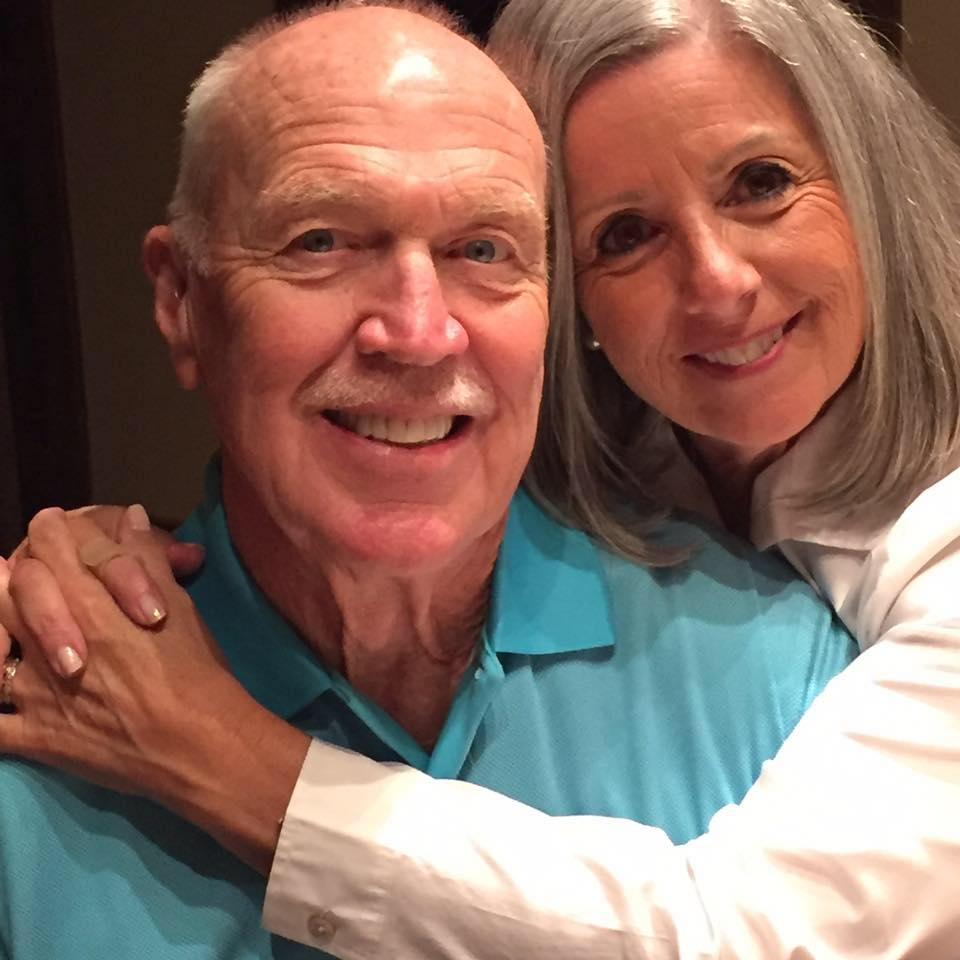
- Pepiot with his wife in 2016
- Born: Kenneth Dale Pepiot; April 4, 1943 (age 83)
- Occupation: Special effects supervisor
- Years active: 1976–2005

Kenneth Dale Pepiot (born April 4, 1943) is an American special effects supervisor. Specialist in pyrotechnics and special effects, he participated in more than forty films between 1976 and 2005. He worked on Carrie, Scarface, Beverly Hills Cop and Planet of the Apes.

== Biography ==
Kenneth Dale Pepiot, a native of Ohio, is a descendant of Pierre Joseph Aimé Pepiot and Marie Célestine Pequignot, immigrants who arrived from Franche-Comté, France, in 1836.

Pepiot entered the industry in 1976 as assistant special effects on Brian De Palma's Carrie. He went on to serve as special effects director on the NBC miniseries Beulah Land (1980) and as special effects supervisor on The Right Stuff (1983).

One of his most notable contributions is his work on Scarface (1983), where he and Stan Parks co-invented a gun-synchronizer device that aligned firearm triggers with the camera shutter, ensuring muzzle flashes were reliably captured on film. Cinematographer John A. Alonzo noted that this eliminated costly post-production rotoscoping, while director Brian De Palma highlighted its effectiveness in the film's climactic shootout sequences.

== Nominations ==
- 1991: Nominated for the Saturn Awards (alongside Rick Baker and Dennis Michelson) for Gremlins 2: The New Batch
- 2000: OFTA Film Award nomination for Cast Away

== Filmography ==
- Carrie (1976) (assistant special effects - as Kenneth Pepiot)
- Mr. Billion (1977) (special effects - uncredited)
- Comes a Horseman (1978) (special effects assistant)
- The Great Santini (1979) (special effects)
- Beulah Land (1980) (special effects director)
- Heaven's Gate (1980) (special effects)
- Inchon (1981) (special effects supervisor - as Kenneth Pepiot)
- Jinxed! (1982) (special effects: second unit)
- Safari 3000 (1982) (special effects)
- Death Wish II (1982) (special effects - as Kenneth Pepiot)
- Scarface (1983) (special effects)
- The Right Stuff (1983) (special effects supervisor - as Kenneth Pepiot)
- The River (1984) (special effects supervisor)
- Beverly Hills Cop (1984) (special effects)
- Invitation to Hell (1984) (TV Movie) (special effects)
- The Legend of Billie Jean (1985) (special effects coordinator)
- Chiller (1985) (TV Movie) (special effects coordinator)
- Iron Eagle (1986) (special effects supervisor)
- Band of the Hand (1986) (special effects coordinator)
- *batteries not included (1987) (special effects supervisor)
- Fatal Beauty (1987) (special effects supervisor - as Kenneth D. Pepiot)
- Black Rain (1989) (special effects - as Kenneth D. Pepiot)
- Warlock (1989) (special effects coordinator)
- The 'Burbs (1989) (special effects supervisor)
- Predator 2 (1990) (special effects supervisor)
- Gremlins 2: The New Batch (1990) (special effects supervisor)
- City Slickers (1991) (special effects coordinator - as Kenneth D. Pepiot)
- Sneakers (1992) (special effects coordinator)
- Memoirs of an Invisible Man (1992) (special effects coordinator)
- Addams Family Values (1993) (special effects coordinator - as Kenneth D. Pepiot)
- Fearless (1993) (special effects coordinator)
- Point of No Return (1993) (special effects coordinator)
- The Shadow (1994) (special effects coordinator)
- Virtuosity (1995) (special effects supervisor - as Kenneth D. Pepiot)
- Tank Girl (1995) (special effects coordinator)
- The Glimmer Man (1996) (special effects coordinator)
- Executive Decision (1996) (special effects coordinator - as Kenneth D. Pepiot)
- Small Soldiers (1998) (special effects coordinator)
- Sphere (1998) (special effects supervisor)
- The Mod Squad (1999) (special effects supervisor)
- Cast Away (2000) (special effects supervisor - as Kenneth D. Pepiot)
- The Adventures of Rocky & Bullwinkle (2000) (special effects coordinator - as Kenneth D. Pepiot)
- Planet of the Apes (2001) (special effects coordinator)
- Red Dragon (2002) (special effects coordinator - as Kenneth D. Pepiot)
- Shoot or Be Shot (2002) (special effects supervisor: second unit)
- Hollywood Homicide (2003) (special effects coordinator - as Kenneth D. Pepiot)
- Flight of the Phoenix (2004) (special effects technician)
- Be Cool (2005) (special effects coordinator)
