= Carrie (2013 film) =

2013 film by Kimberly Peirce

- Theatrical release poster
- Directed by: Kimberly Peirce
- Screenplay by: Lawrence D. Cohen; Roberto Aguirre-Sacasa
- Based on: Carrie by Stephen King
- Produced by: Kevin Misher
- Starring: Chloë Grace Moretz; Judy Greer; Portia Doubleday; Julianne Moore
- Cinematography: Steve Yedlin
- Edited by: Lee Percy; Nancy Richardson
- Music by: Marco Beltrami
- Production companies: Metro-Goldwyn-Mayer Pictures; Screen Gems; Misher Films
- Distributed by: Sony Pictures Releasing
- Release dates: October 7, 2013 (Arclight Hollywood); October 18, 2013 (United States)
- Running time: 99 minutes
- Country: United States
- Language: English
- Budget: $30 million
- Box office: $84.8 million

Carrie is a 2013 American supernatural horror film directed by Kimberly Peirce. It is the third film adaptation of Stephen King's 1974 novel and the fourth film in the Carrie franchise. The film was produced by Kevin Misher, with a screenplay by Lawrence D. Cohen and Roberto Aguirre-Sacasa. The film stars Chloë Grace Moretz as the titular character Carrie White, alongside Julianne Moore as her mother Margaret. The cast also features Judy Greer, Portia Doubleday, Gabriella Wilde, Ansel Elgort and Alex Russell. The film is a modern re-imagining of King's novel, following the original 1976 adaptation, about a shy high school girl outcast by her peers and sheltered by her deeply religious mother who gets revenge using her telekinetic powers.

The film held its world premiere at the Arclight Hollywood in Los Angeles on October 7, 2013, and was released in the United States by Metro-Goldwyn-Mayer Pictures and Screen Gems on October 18. The film received mixed reviews, with critics calling it "unnecessary" and criticizing the lack of originality and scares, though they praised the modern updates and cast. It grossed $84 million worldwide at the box office.

== Plot ==
Carrie White is a shy, unpopular girl from Ewen High School in Maine. While showering after gym class, Carrie unexpectedly experiences her first menstrual period. Believing she is bleeding to death, she runs out yelling for help, but the other girls ridicule her by throwing tampons and pads at her. Bully Chris Hargensen records the incident on her cell phone and uploads it to YouTube.

The school's physical education teacher, Miss Rita Desjardin, comforts Carrie and sends her home with her disturbed, religious fanatic mother Margaret White, who believes menstruation is a sin. Margaret demands that Carrie abstain from showering with the others. When Carrie refuses, Margaret hits her in the forehead with a Bible and locks her in her "prayer closet". As Carrie screams to be let out, a crack appears on the door, and the crucifix in the closet begins to bleed. Carrie begins to experience more telekinetic abilities and researches her abilities, learning to harness them.

Miss Desjardin gives the girls who harassed Carrie an ultimatum: either detention all week for their behavior or be suspended from school, prohibiting them from attending prom; Chris is the only one who refuses to take part and is suspended. Sue Snell regrets her part in the incident. To make amends, she asks her boyfriend, Tommy Ross, to take Carrie to the prom. Carrie accepts Tommy's invitation and makes a prom dress at home. Carrie asks Margaret to let her go to prom, and Carrie manifests her telekinesis. Margaret believes this power comes from the Devil and is proof that Carrie has been corrupted by sin.

On prom night, Margaret tries to prevent Carrie from going, but Carrie uses her powers to lock Margaret in the closet. At prom, as part of Chris and her boyfriend Billy Nolan's plan, their friends, Tina and Jackie, discreetly slip fake ballots into the voting box, which name Carrie and Tommy as prom queen and king. At home, Sue receives a text from Chris, taunting her about her scheme to humiliate Carrie. Sue drives to the prom, arriving just as Carrie and Tommy are about to be crowned. Sue sees the bucket of blood dangling above Carrie and attempts to warn someone, but Desjardin locks her out of the gym, suspecting that Sue plans to hurt Carrie.

Chris dumps the blood onto Carrie and Tommy, and Tina plays the "shower video" of Carrie on the large screens, inciting laughter from the audience. Carrie pushes Miss Desjardin with her powers when Desjardin attempts to help her. The bucket falls onto Tommy's head, killing him. Enraged, Carrie uses her telekinesis to kill many of the students and staff but spares Desjardin. An electrical wire merges with leaking water, and a fire breaks out. As the school burns to the ground, Carrie walks away. Chris and Billy attempt to drive away, but Carrie crashes the car, killing Billy. Chris attempts to run Carrie over, but Carrie lifts the car and throws it at a gas station, killing her.

Carrie arrives home and takes a bath. Carrie tearfully tells Margaret about the prank, and Margaret recounts Carrie's conception, revealing that Carrie's father raped her, and Carrie's birth made her believe that Carrie is a sin she must pay for. Margaret stabs Carrie with a knife, believing that she must kill Carrie in order to prevent the Devil from possessing her again, and attacks Carrie, but Carrie kills her with many sharp tools. She becomes hysterical and makes stones rain from the sky to crush the house. When Sue arrives, a furious Carrie lifts her with her powers but senses that Sue is pregnant. Carrie protects Sue and throws her out of the house to safety as the house collapses and sinks, apparently killing Carrie as well.

After giving her testimony in court regarding the prom incident, Sue visits Carrie and Margaret's graves and places white roses by the headstone. As she leaves, the gravestone begins to break, and an enraged scream is heard, alluding that Carrie may have somehow survived.

=== Alternate ending ===
After placing the roses on Carrie's grave, Sue suddenly feels pain from her pregnancy and begins to go into labor. As Sue struggles to give birth at the hospital, Carrie's bloody hand suddenly emerges and grabs Sue's arm. Sue screams loudly as she wakes up in her own bedroom with her mother comforting her and telling her that her nightmare is over.

== Cast ==
- Chloë Grace Moretz as Carrie White
- Julianne Moore as Margaret White
- Judy Greer as Miss Desjardin
- Portia Doubleday as Chris Hargensen
- Alex Russell as Billy Nolan
- Gabriella Wilde as Sue Snell
- Ansel Elgort as Tommy Ross
- Barry Shabaka Henley as Principal Morton
- Zoë Belkin as Tina
- Samantha Weinstein as Heather
- Karissa Strain as Nicki
- Katie Strain as Lizzy
- Kyle Mac as Kenny
- Max Topplin as Jackie
- Cynthia Preston as Mrs. Snell
- Demetrius Joyette as George
- Mouna Traoré as Erika
- Connor Price as Freddy "Beak" Holt
- Hart Bochner as John Hargensen (uncredited)

== Production ==
=== Development and writing ===
In May 2011, representatives from MGM and Screen Gems announced they were producing a film remake of Carrie. Upon hearing of the new adaptation, Stephen King remarked, "The real question is why, when the original was so good?" He suggested Lindsay Lohan for the main role and stated that "it [the film] would certainly be fun to cast". Actress Sissy Spacek, who played Carrie in the 1976 adaptation, expressed approval on the choice of Lohan for the character of Carrie White, stating, "Oh my God, she's really a beautiful girl and so I was very flattered that they were casting someone to look like me instead of the real Carrie described in the book. It's gonna be real interesting". Jonathan Glickman, president of MGM's film division, said two reasons to do the remake were the advances in special effects since the 1976 film, as well as the prevalence of bullying as a national crisis.

The studios committed to making an R-rated film at the outset. They hired Roberto Aguirre-Sacasa, who previously adapted King's work The Stand into a comic book, to write a screenplay that delivers "a more faithful adaption" of King's novel than the 1976 film. However, Aguirre-Sacasa ultimately shares a screenwriting credit with Lawrence D. Cohen, who wrote the 1976 film.

In January 2012, Kimberly Peirce was announced as the director. Peirce, a fan of King's novel and an admirer of De Palma's film, agreed to direct when she received De Palma's blessing. Said Peirce of her interest in the material: "Oh, these are all my issues: I deal with misfits, with what power does to people, with humiliation and anger and violence. Like Brandon, Carrie has gone through life getting beaten up by everyone. She's got no safe place. And then she finds telekinesis — her talent, her skill — and it becomes her refuge." Peirce and producer Kevin Misher sought to make the film more faithful to the book, as opposed to a retread of De Palma's Carrie. Among the changes the filmmakers added was a focus on the mother-daughter relationship as the heart of the film, more character development of Sue and Chris, a plot line involving cyberbullying to modernize the story, and giving Carrie more control of her powers. Peirce conceived of her adaptation as a superhero origin story, saying, "I wanted to look at when [Carrie] got her powers and give her a chance to explore those powers. I make it clear she doesn’t have the mastery yet. But then she has the control — and loses control."

=== Casting ===
In March 2012, the role of Carrie White was offered to Chloë Grace Moretz, who accepted the role. In May, Ansel Elgort, Alex Russell, and Judy Greer were cast in leading roles.

=== Filming ===
Principal photography took place in mid-2012 in the Greater Toronto Area, with locations including Mississauga and Etobicoke.

The film was shot on an Alexa camera. As a reference for the prom scene when Carrie unleashes her powers, Peirce and her visual effects team used atomic bomb footage from the 1950s and 1960s to model the energy waves that radiate from Carrie.

== Release ==
The original release date was March 15, 2013, and a teaser trailer was released on October 15, 2012. However, in January 2013, the release date was moved to October 18, 2013, with reshoots cited by the studio as the reason for the delay. Some journalists speculated the delay was not only to presumably capitalize on the box office potential of Halloween season but was also a result of studios not wanting to release content concerning violence in schools so soon after the 2012 Sandy Hook Elementary School shooting.

Moretz told Fangoria at the time: "We did some reshoots and added three extra scenes with Julianne and I to make the movie even deeper and darker. We prolonged a couple of scenes that needed to have an extra moment or an extra beat just to make it even deeper. It wasn't about cutting anything out or trying to edit around things; it was about adding more to make the movie scarier and more intense."

Sony held a "First Look" event at the New York Comic Con on October 13, 2013, that allowed attendees to view the film prior to the release date. The event was followed by a panel session with several members of the cast and crew.

Trailers for the film included a phone number that offered promotions to the caller, as well as a recording of a simulated encounter with characters from the film.

Two weeks prior to Carrie's release, the studio reportedly held test screenings in which they showed viewers four different alternate endings and asked them to pick which one they liked best.

=== Home media ===
The film was released on DVD and Blu-ray on January 14, 2014. The Blu-ray features an alternative opening and ending and nine deleted scenes.

In the alternative opening, a young Carrie has a discussion with her teenage neighbor, who is sun-bathing, over the fact that Margaret believes that women with breasts are sinful. Margaret catches them in the conversation and believes that the neighbor is offending Carrie before the neighbor's mother disagrees with her. Suddenly, stones begin to rain only on the White household. Margaret, believing it is a sign from God, takes shelter inside her home with a distressed Carrie.

On March 19, 2024, Shout! Factory released an Ultra HD Blu-ray of the film, offering only the theatrical cut.

== Reception ==
=== Critical reception ===
The review aggregator website Rotten Tomatoes reported a 51% approval rating with an average rating of 5.49/10 based on 184 reviews. The website's critical consensus reads: "It boasts a talented cast, but Kimberly Peirce's 'reimagining' of Brian De Palma's horror classic finds little new in the Stephen King novel – and feels woefully unnecessary." On Metacritic, it scored a 53 out of 100 based on 34 reviews, indicating "mixed or average" reviews. Audiences polled by CinemaScore gave the film an average grade of B− on an A+ to F scale.

Kevin C. Johnson of the St. Louis Post-Dispatch gave the film a favorable review: "Long before the blood starts spilling, it's clear the new team has mostly nailed it. The reboot is as good a Carrie remake as possible, though it's not truly a scary movie; the film takes its time living up to its R rating". Mick LaSalle of the San Francisco Chronicle also gave the film a favorable review: "In a way, the new Carrie is almost too easy to enjoy. Everything discordant and all the nagging weirdness and strange feelings surrounding the original have been smoothed down, and what we're left with is a well-made, highly satisfying and not particularly deep high school revenge movie". Michael Phillips of the Chicago Tribune wrote, "The acting's strong; in addition to Moretz and Moore, Judy Greer is a welcome presence in the Betty Buckley role of the sympathetic gym instructor. But something's missing from this well-made venture. What's there is more than respectable, while staying this side of surprising".

Joe Neumaier of the New York Daily News gave it three out of five stars: "With the exception of some appearances by social media, Carrie doesn't try to hip up King's basic, often slow story. And while De Palma's version is fondly recalled as a high-blood-mark of the 1970s, this new take seems to linger a bit more on the bugaboos of overparenting and bullying while underplaying Mama's fanaticism. Peirce only glancingly lets her heroine have a mild discovery-of-powers moment that feels 'X-Men'-ish". In a positive review on Roger Ebert's website, Matt Zoller Seitz awarded the film three out of four stars, praising the portrayal of Carrie and Margaret's relationship and the feelings of sympathy Carrie manages to evoke, although he criticizes the representation of Chris as "exaggeratedly evil". Seitz ultimately concludes by stating: "The first Carrie was horror. This is tragedy".

A. A. Dowd of The A.V. Club gave the film a C− rating, criticizing Moretz's Carrie as "too adjusted, coming across less like the 'very peculiar girl' King described in his novel and more like the stealth babe of some nottie-to-hottie teen romance". Dowd lamented on the film as a whole: "It's a strange thing to say about a movie so obsessed with the red stuff, but this Carrie is bloodless". In Grantland, Wesley Morris wrote, "[Peirce's] movies include Boys Don't Cry and Stop-Loss, and you can feel her caught in the awkward position of wanting to challenge the material, to open it up further rather than furnishing the film with as much vaginal imagery as she does. You can also sense her not wanting to alienate the audience or the studio."

=== Box office ===
Sony estimated the revenue for the opening weekend of Carrie as between $16 million and $18 million, while others estimated a bigger margin of $24 million to $28 million due to the Halloween season. However, the final takings totaled $16.1 million and the film came in at number 3 behind Gravity and Captain Philips, which were in their second and third weeks, respectively. By the end of the week, the film managed to gross $20.1 million. In week two, the film slipped 62.8% to sixth place with $5.9 million and 43.2% to ninth place in its third week with $3.4 million.

At the end of its run, the film grossed $35.3 million in North America and $49.5 million in other countries for a worldwide gross of $84.8 million. It was the 85th highest-grossing film of 2013 in the United States.

=== Accolades ===
Year	Award	Category	Recipient(s)	Result
2013	Alliance of Women Film Journalists	Sequel or Remake That Shouldn't Have Been Made	Carrie (tied with Oz the Great and Powerful)	Won
2013	Fright Meter Awards	Best Supporting Actress	Julianne Moore	Nominated
2013	Fright Meter Awards	Best Special Effects	Carrie	Nominated
2013	Women Film Critics Circle Awards	Hall of Shame (Note: Category is "Why is it that when actresses and even screen goddesses hit a certain age, they’re all cast as nags, loons and shrews".)	Carrie	Won
2014	People's Choice Awards	Favorite Horror Movie	Carrie	Won
2014	Saturn Awards	Best Horror Film	Carrie	Nominated
2014	Saturn Awards	Best Young Actor/Actress	Chloë Grace Moretz	Won
2014	Fangoria Chainsaw Awards	Best Supporting Actress	Julianne Moore	3rd place
2014	Dorian Awards	Campy Flick of the Year	Carrie	Nominated
2014	Jupiter Awards	Best International Actress	Chloë Grace Moretz	Nominated
2014	Joey Awards	International (Non-Canadian) Actress Feature Film/Made for Television or Straight to Video Feature that was filmed in Canada	Chloë Grace Moretz	Won
2014	World Soundtrack Awards	Film Composer of the Year	Marco Beltrami	Nominated

== Alternate scenes ==
The alternate ending of Sue giving birth, Carrie's arm grabbing her, and Sue realizing she was having a nightmare was the preferred ending of Peirce and Moretz, but was overruled by the studio. In a 2014 interview, Peirce said, "I had in the back of mind that this coda was important. I thought we needed something shocking, something that kept with the story, and something that was fun. It's like going up to bat. Are we going to compete with De Palma? No. But it's fun. Why it's not in the movie… well, ask the people who have the power". Critics expressed that this ending would have been better than the theatrical version, making for a scarier finale and also functioning as a direct reference to the ending of De Palma's 1976 film.

Reports of further material excised from the theatrical cut and not included in the Blu-ray release led fans to create a petition for MGM/UA to release a director's cut of the film. The film's teaser trailer, which was first released on October 15, 2012, suggested a more faithful adaptation of King's novel, with voiceovers that recalled the White Committee used as a framing device in the book, and the camera zooming out on a destroyed, burning town.
