= Naika Toussaint =

Canadian actress (born 1988)

- Born: Naïka Toussaint; 1988 (age 37–38); Surrey, British Columbia, Canada
- Occupation: Actress
- Years active: 2012–present
- Height: 1.63 m (5 ft 4 in)

Naïka Toussaint (born 1988) is a Canadian film and television actress, active since 2012. She also briefly worked as an arts and entertainment columnist between 2022 and 2023.

== Filmography ==
=== Film ===
Film roles
Year	Title	Role	Notes
2014	Wolf	Kathy	Short film
2016	Deadpool	Teen Girl #2	
2016	Counter Act	Mary Davis	Short film
2020	El Color Negro		Short film
2020	Her Coming	Claire	Short film
2021	Four Walls	Karen	
2021	Drinkwater	Ms. Leblanc	
2023	Let This Feeling Go	Jay	Short film
2024	Can I Get a Witness?	Justice	
2024	Heroes	Cindy	Short film
2025	The Wrong Paris	Amber	

=== Television ===
Television roles
Year	Title	Role	Notes
2012	Untold Stories of the E.R.	Lisa	TV series (season 6, episode 7)
2012	Abducted: The Carlina White Story	Tina	TV movie
2013	Cult	Show P.A.	TV series
2014	Witches of East End	Waitress	TV series (season 2, episode 10)
2015	Murder, She Baked: A Plum Pudding Mystery	Waitress	TV movie
2016	Motive		TV series (season 4)
2016	You Me Her	Mystery	TV series (season 1, episode 7)
2016	Wayward Pines	Wife (2 episodes); Jackie (1 episode)	TV series (season 2)
2016	Van Helsing	Sheema	TV series (season 1)
2016	Haters Back Off	Ruth	TV series (season 1, episode 7)
2016	The Real MVP: The Wanda Durant Story	Tamara	TV movie
2016	A Wish for Christmas	Caroller	TV movie
2016	Timeless	Slave Woman	TV series (season 1, episode 10)
2017	Story of a Girl	Lee	TV movie
2017	Pretty Little Dead Girl	Tina	TV movie
2017	The Christmas Train	Becky	TV movie
2017	Christmas Solo / A Song for Christmas	Audrey	TV movie
2018	The Arrangement	P.A.	TV series (season 2, episode 9)
2018	Once Upon a Time	Seraphina	TV series (season 7, episodes 19 and 20)
2018	Garage Sales Mysteries: Picture a Murder	Tess Meadows	TV movie
2018	Christmas Pen Pals	Julie	TV movie
2019	Identity Theft of a Cheerleader	Maddy	TV movie
2019	Over the Moon in Love	Mia	TV movie
2020	A Beautiful Place to Die: A Martha's Vineyard Mystery	Officer Jenkins	TV movie
2020	Love in Store	Hillary	TV movie
2022	The Imperfects	Melanie	TV series (episode 3)
2022	Bear Apocalypse	Nikki	TV series
2024	Allegiance	Keisha Barrows	TV series (season 1, episode 3)
2024	Under the Bridge	Dahlia	TV series (episode 5)
2025	The Irrational	Viola Salong	TV series (season 2, episode 17)
2025	Washington Black	Naomi	TV series
2025	Deck the Hallways	Zoe	TV movie
2026	Carrie	Stella Horan	TV series

== Awards and nominations ==
Awards and nominations
Year	Event	Category	Work	Result
2017	Victoria TX Independent Film Festival	Best Actress	Counter Act	Nominated
