= The Tommyknockers =

1987 science fiction horror novel

- First edition cover
- Author: Stephen King
- Cover artist: One Plus One Studio
- Language: English
- Genre: Science fiction, Horror
- Published: November 11, 1987
- Publisher: Putnam
- Publication place: United States
- Media type: Print (Hardcover)
- Pages: 558
- ISBN: 978-0-399-13314-5

The Tommyknockers is a 1987 science fiction horror novel by Stephen King. The novel is an excursion into the realm of science fiction for King, as the residents of the Maine town of Haven gradually fall under the influence of a mysterious object buried in the woods. King has since soured on The Tommyknockers, describing it as "an awful book", due to his drug addiction while writing the novel, though acknowledges the story's potential: "There's really a good book in here, underneath all the sort of spurious energy that cocaine provides, and I ought to go back." A miniseries adaptation was released in 1993.

== Plot ==
While walking in the woods near the small town of Haven, Maine, Roberta "Bobbi" Anderson, a writer of Wild West-themed fiction, stumbles upon a metal object that turns out to be a protrusion of a long-buried alien spacecraft. Once exposed, the spacecraft begins to release an invisible gas into the atmosphere that gradually transforms people into beings similar to the aliens who populated the ship. The transformation, or "becoming", provides them with a limited form of genius which makes them very inventive but does not provide any philosophical or ethical insight into their inventions, and they often do not understand the principles of the inventions (one of them admits, "We're builders, not understanders"). The spacecraft also prevents those affected by it from leaving town, provokes psychotic violence in some people, and causes the disappearance of a young boy, David Brown, whose older brother Hilly teleports him to the planet referred to as Altair 4 by the Havenites (a reference to Forbidden Planet).

The book's central character is James Eric Gardener, a poet and friend of Bobbi, who goes by the nickname "Gard". He is somewhat immune to the ship's effects because of the steel plate in his head, a souvenir of a teenage skiing accident. Gard is also an alcoholic and is prone to binges that result in violent outbursts followed by lengthy blackouts.

As Bobbi is almost totally overcome by the euphoria of "becoming" one with the spacecraft, Gard increasingly sees her health worsen and her sanity disappear. Gard feels he has little to live for aside from his friendship with Bobbi and decides to stay with her to try to halt her decline. He witnesses the transformation of the townspeople, discovers the torture and mutilation of Bobbi's dog Peter, and sees people being killed or worse when they pry too deeply into the strange events.

Over the course of several weeks, Gard, Bobbi, and others continue to unearth the ship. Bobbi and Gard eventually enter the ship; as they explore the ship, Gard realizes that the ship crashed because the crew was fighting with each other, and that the Tommyknockers have no moral limits to keep them from using living beings as organic batteries. As they leave the ship and return to Bobbi's home, Gard plans to kill Bobbi as he can see she is no longer human. Using a gun, Bobbi forces Gard to swallow a lethal dose of Valium. As they talk, he shields his mind, pulls his own gun out, and shoots Bobbi. As Bobbi dies, she telepathically screams and alerts the townspeople, who then swarm to her home, intent on killing Gard for fear that he intends to harm the ship. Ev Hillman, David and Hilly's grandfather, helps Gard escape into the woods in exchange for saving David Brown from Altair 4.

Gard enters the ship, near death after his struggle with the townspeople. With his last ounce of strength, he activates the ship and telepathically launches it into space. This results in the eventual deaths of nearly all of the changed townspeople, but prevents the possibly disastrous consequences of the ship's influence spreading to the outside world. Very shortly afterward, agents from the FBI, CIA, and "The Shop" invade Haven and take as many of the Havenites as possible (killing nearly a quarter of the survivors), along with a few of the devices created by the altered people of Haven. In the last pages, David Brown is discovered safe in Hilly Brown's hospital room.

== Influences ==
In his autobiography On Writing, King attributes the basic premise to the short story "The Colour Out of Space" by H. P. Lovecraft. He also used a poem from his childhood for the book's preamble:

Late last night and the night before
Tommyknockers, Tommyknockers
knocking at the door.
I want to go out;
don't know if I can,
'cause I'm so afraid
of the Tommyknocker man.

The writer and critic Kim Newman said of the novel that King had "more or less rewritten Quatermass and the Pit ", a television serial from the late 1950s in which an alien spacecraft excavated in London evokes latent psychic abilities in some of the people who come near it. King wrote The Tommyknockers at a time when substance abuse was a significant part of his life. Metaphors for the stranglehold of addiction can be found throughout the book. In a 2014 interview with Rolling Stone, King acknowledged that the quality of his writing suffered during his period of drug use, saying "The Tommyknockers is an awful book. That was the last one I wrote before I cleaned up my act", adding he believes it could be a good book if it was rewritten to about half its original length.

Other themes in the book include the dangers of unchecked technological advancement and the corrupting influence of power. Bobbi uses the threat of stupid people in charge ("the Dallas Police", referring to how poorly the Dallas police handled the JFK assassination) to get Gardener to help her until Gardener realizes that this also applies to the Tommyknockers themselves. Gardener obsesses over the subject of "the nukes", the reckless use of atomic power and the dangerous mishandling of nuclear material. The physical transformation of the townspeople resembles the toxic effects of ionizing radiation.

The dog in Tommyknockers is called Peter and is a beagle; in 1960, Peter S. Beagle had published his first fantasy novel, A Fine and Private Place, about ghosts who stay near their place of burial. In 2010, Beagle edited a fiction anthology, The Secret History of Fantasy, in which he included a short story by King.

== Adaptations ==
A two-part television miniseries based on the novel was shown in 1993 on ABC, starring Jimmy Smits as Jim Gardner and Marg Helgenberger as Bobbi Anderson. King has stated that he "didn't like it", commenting that "it felt kind of cheap and thrown together". NBC announced in July 2013 that they would be producing a new miniseries based on The Tommyknockers. THR reported on March 29, 2018, that The Conjuring filmmaker James Wan and the 2017 It producer Roy Lee will join up with producer Larry Sanitsky to create a feature film version of The Tommyknockers.

== See also ==
- Stephen King bibliography
