= Scarrie! The Musical =

- An Unauthorized Musical Parody
- Music: David Cerda; Scott Lamberty; Taylor E. Ross
- Lyrics: David Cerda
- Book: David Cerda
- Basis: The 1976 film Carrie
- Productions: 1998 Andersonville; 2005 Chicago; 2012 Chicago

Scarrie! the Musical (originally s'Carrie the Musical) is an unauthorized musical stage spoof of the 1976 Brian De Palma film Carrie based on the 1974 novel of the same name by Stephen King, the tale of a high school misfit. The musical had a script by David Cerda with music and lyrics by Cerda, Scott Lamberty and Taylor E. Ross. The musical spoof played in two different productions in Illinois. The musical uses a 1970s influenced score and "lots of pigs blood".

== Production history ==
Scarrie was originally produced by Sweetback Productions entitled s'Carrie as a late night's show at the Sweetcorn Playhouse in the Andersonville neighborhood of Chicago, Illinois. The original cast included Rebecca Behrman (Sue), David Cerda (Debbie), Cynthia Cervini (Margaret Whyte), Steve Hickson (Miss Collins), TJ O'Brien (Carrie), Ludwig (Cany), Heather Moran (Chris Hargenson), Rosie Maddox (Principal), Sam Poretta (Billy Nolan), and Emily Zimmerman (Norma). The show ran for over a year and a half and closed when Sweetcorn Playhouse closed down.

The show was amended and re-staged in 2005 from Cerda's own company Hell in a Handbag Productions. This new production featured revisions of old songs as well as an additional ten tracks. Jackie Anderson served as Producer and Margot Bordelon directed.

The show featured Joey Steakley (Carrie White) Ed Jones (Margaret White), Merrie Greenfield (Mrs. Snell), Trista Smith (Coach Collins), Veronica Sheaffer (Sue Snell), Robyn Senchak (Chris Hargensen), Jaya Subramanian (Debbie), Ryan Lanning (Tommy Ross) and Tim Howard as Billy Nolan. The shows creative team included Bobbie Bagby (Choreographer), Matthew Kollar (Set Designer), Bill Morey (Costumes Designer) and Doug MacDonald (Lighting Designer), Aaron Smith (Percussions), Rob Steel (Sound Design) and John E. Buranosky (Props).

The official cast album is on the Hell in a Handbag Productions website.

Hell in a Handbag launched another (and allegedly final) revival of Scarrie which started previews September 28 and opened October 6. It ran until November 10. The production was set to feature music from both the original and the 2005 production, as well as some new editions to the script and score. The revival starred Alex Grelle as Carrie, Danni Smith as Margaret White, Steve Love as Sue Snell and Aubrey Stanton as Chris Hargensen. Ed Jones (2005's Margaret White) played Miss Collins, AJ Wright played Tommy Ross, and David Lipschutz played Billy Nolan. As a treat to Handbag fans, writer David Cerda was featured in the production as well. The production was directed by Cheryl Snodgrass, with musical direction by Josh Walker and choreography by Kristen Smiley.

== Reviews ==
The Chicago Reader said the original production "revels in its own mind-numbing stupidity" and, comparing it to the flop Broadway musical version of Carrie, said "a just plain terrible show and a self-consciously terrible show really aren't all that different".

Reviewing the 2005 revival, the Chicago Tribune said it needed half an hour cut but praised Joey Steakley, cross-dressing in the title role. The Windy City Times praised the cast and called it a "triumph". The Chicago Reader said the revival was "often entertaining but never quite as funny as it could be".

== Musical numbers ==
Act I

- "High School World" - Girls and Carrie White
- "Plug it Up" - Carrie, Girls and Miss Collins
- "These Are Godless Times" - Margaret White
- "I'm Carrie" - Carrie, Sue, Chris and Company
- "Say It" - Margaret, Carrie and Company
- "Beautiful" - Tommy and Company
- "Gonna Make You Sweat" - Miss Collins and Girls
- "Do it for Me" - Sue, Chris, Tommy and Billy
- "You're Not That Ugly" - Miss Collins and Carrie

Act II

- "Things Are Gonna Be Different" - Carrie, Sue and Company
- "Wham! Bam! Beautiful!" - Chris, Billy and Ensemble
- "It's the Prom" - Ensemble
- "Our Future Starts Today" - Candy
- "I'm Carrie - Reprise" - Carrie
- "Telekinetic Prom" - Carrie
- "Sin Never Dies" - Margaret
- "So it Goes" - Company
