= Alison Thornton =

Canadian actress

- Thornton in 2026
- Born: 1999 (age 26–27)
- Occupation: Actress
- Years active: 2013–present

Alison Thornton (born 1999) is a Canadian actress. She is best known for playing Zooey Hernandez Frumpkis in Girlfriends' Guide to Divorce, Lydia Spring in Dirk Gently's Holistic Detective Agency and Chris Hargensen in Carrie.

== Career ==
Thornton began performing at the age of five in dance, singing, piano, and theater at Place des Arts in Coquitlam, British Columbia. In her first television role, she played Angeline Bennett in the Hallmark Channel film Let It Snow starring Candace Cameron Bure and Alan Thicke. She then played Charlotte Spehn in the film The Color of Rain with Lacey Chabert. She played Zooey Hernandez Frumpkis for 26 episodes of Bravo's first scripted series, Girlfriends' Guide to Divorce, and Lydia Spring in Dirk Gently's Holistic Detective Agency, alongside Elijah Wood. In 2018, she was cast as Bethany Forrest in the independent film The Mental State.

In 2018, she was cast as a guest star in the television pilot for a potential series adapted from the Megan Abbott novel Dare Me; in 2019, the concept was picked up to series, and she was promoted to a series regular role as Tacy Cassidy on the Dare Me tv series, which was cancelled after 10 episodes.

== Filmography ==
=== Film ===
Year	Title	Role	Notes
2022	The Ray	Tara	
2022	Girl Gone Bad	Samantha	Also producer
2023	The Mental State	Bethany Forrest	
2025	What Comes Next	Tanya	

=== Television ===
Year	Title	Role	Notes
2013	Let it Snow	Angeline Bennett	Television film
2014	The Color of Rain	Charlotte Spehn	Television film
2014	The 100	Tris	Episode: "The Calm"
2015–2018	Girlfriends' Guide to Divorce	Zoey Hernandez Frumpkis	Recurring role, 26 episodes
2016	Dirk Gently's Holistic Detective Agency	Lydia Spring	Recurring role, 7 episodes
2017	Supergirl	Young Girl	Episode: "Reign"
2019–2020	Dare Me	Tacy Cassidy	Main role
2021–2023	Nancy Drew	Birdie	Recurring role
2021	Law & Order: Special Victims Unit	Victoria Warshofsky	Episode: "Nightmares in Drill City"
2022	Caught in His Web	Emma	Television film
2023–2025	School Spirits	Chloe	Recurring role
2023	The Rookie	Dara Tesca	Episode: "S.T.R"
2023	Quantum Leap	Carrie Baker	Episode: "Closure Encounters"
2023	Creepshow	Shelby	Episode: "Baby Teeth"
2024	Wild Cards	Brittany	Episode: "Con with the Wind"
2024	Tracker	Emmaline Trace	Episode: "Preternatural"
2026–present	Elle	Katie	Guest role; 2 episodes
2026	Carrie	Chris Hargensen	Main role; 8 episodes (season 1)
