= Mario Tosi =

Italian-American cinematographer (1935–2021)

- Born: May 11, 1935; Rome, Italy
- Died: November 11, 2021 (aged 86); Fort Lauderdale, Florida
- Occupation: Cinematographer

Mario Tosi (May 11, 1935 – November 11, 2021) was an Italian-American painter, cinematographer and cameraman.

Tosi's works include The Killing Kind (1973), Report to the Commissioner (1975), Carrie (1976), and Sybil (1976), for which he was nominated for an Emmy. Tosi was the recipient of the Lifetime Achievement Award at the 2009 Fort Lauderdale International Film Festival.
