= Karissa and Katie Strain =

Canadian twin actresses

- Born: Karissa Nicole Strain; Katie Lynne Strain; July 21, 1990 (age 35)
- Other name: KarKat
- Occupation: Actresses
- Years active: 2004–present
- Notable work: Nicki and Lizzy in Carrie

Karissa Nicole and Katie Lynne Strain (born July 21, 1990) are Canadian twin actresses.

They are best known for their roles in Todd and the Book of Pure Evil and Carrie.

== Personal life ==
Karissa and Katie were born on July 21, 1990. They were supposed to be born in the month of August, but they were delivered early, making them Cancers.They grew up in Chatham, Ontario.

In recent years, Karissa and Katie researched their horoscope and discovered that the Sanskrit word for Cancer is Karkat. Coincidentally, the first three letters of each of their name in their birth order spells out Karkat. This led to them getting a tattoo of the word written in Sanskrit and also deciding to brand their production company name "KarKat". Karissa and Katie have Twitter and Instagram accounts under their production name.

== Career ==
Karissa and Katie's first film role came in the form of body doubling for Mary Kate and Ashley Olsen in their feature film New York Minute. After this, Karissa and Katie gained many roles, both together and separate, in film and television. Karissa and Katie's most memorable roles were as villainous twins in both Todd and the Book of Pure Evil and Carrie.

In recent years, Karissa and Katie have booked various guest star roles on television series. In December 2015, they were cast as Cora and Jolene in the first season of the Syfy series Wynonna Earp, based on the comic book of same name.

Aside from acting, the twins have also done modeling. Karissa has worked as a model for Nike and Sears, among other things, while Katie has modeled for Ford, though mostly worked freelance.

In September 2017, Karissa and Katie booked their first lead roles as Celeste and Leeann Hart, the protagonist and antagonist, in the feature film Downward Twin, which they began filming on October 16, 2017. Downward Twin was later renamed to Twinsanity and was digitally released on September 18, 2018.

== Filmography ==
=== Karissa ===
Year	Title	Role	Notes
2004	New York Minute	Jane Ryan	Photo double
2009	Amelia	Commodification Montage Dancer	Minor role
2010	Todd and the Book of Pure Evil	Britney	Episode: "Terrible Twin Turf Tussle"
2010	Murdoch Mysteries	Maisy	Episode: "Blood and Circuses"
2012	Totally Amp'd	ME-4-U	Recurring role
2012	Saving Hope	Kat	Episode: "Consenting Adults"
2012	Mr. Viral	Sin Girl #1/Mom	Supporting role
2012-2013	Scare Tactics	Various	Recurring role
2013	Carrie	Nicki Watson	Supporting role
2014	Reign	Brothel Twin	Episode: "Liege Lord"
2014	Miss-Twin Ception	Twin	Written by
2014	Disconnect	Ghost #2	Short film
2014	Odd Squad	Kailey	Episode: "The Jackies/Invasion of the Body Switchers"
2015	Rogue	Sierra	Episode: "Dirty Laundry"
2016	Day Players	Fan Girl #1	Short film
2016	Wynonna Earp	Cora	Episode: "Landslide"
2017	Hard Luck	Faith	Short film; post-production
2018	Twinsanity	Celeste Hart	Lead role

=== Katie ===
Year	Title	Role	Notes
2004	New York Minute	Roxy Ryan	Photo double
2009	Amelia	Commodification Montage Dancer	Minor role
2010	Todd and the Book of Pure Evil	Delilah	Episode: "Terrible Twin Turf Tussle"
2010	Murdoch Mysteries	Daisy	Episode: "Blood and Circuses"
2012	Totally Amp'd	ME-4-U	Recurring role
2012	Mr. Viral	Sin Girl #2/Diapered Agency Girl	Supporting role
2013	Dirty Talk	Andrea/Katie	Short film
2013	Scare Tactics	Various	Recurring role
2013	Carrie	Lizzy Watson	Supporting role
2013	Beauty & the Beast	Pissed Girlfriend	Episode: "Hothead"
2013	Murdoch Mysteries	Marie Nicholson	Episode: "Loch Ness Murdoch"
2014	Reign	Brothel Twin	Episode: "Liege Lord"
2014	Miss-Twin Ception	Twin	Written by
2014	Disconnect	Ghost #1	Short film
2014	Odd Squad	Hailey	Episode: "The Jackies/Invasion of the Body Switchers"
2015	Rogue	Trinity	Episode: "Dirty Laundry"
2016	Day Players	Fan Girl #2	Short film
2016	Wynonna Earp	Jolene	Episode: "Landslide"
2017	Hard Luck	Chance	Short film; post-production
2018	Luba	Bartender	Post-production
2018	Twinsanity	Leeann Hart	Lead role
2019	Shadowhunters: The Mortal Instruments	Nora Kendall	2 episodes
