= Carrie (1976 film) =

Film by Brian De Palma

- Theatrical release poster
- Directed by: Brian De Palma
- Screenplay by: Lawrence D. Cohen
- Based on: Carrie by Stephen King
- Produced by: Paul Monash
- Starring: Sissy Spacek; John Travolta; Piper Laurie
- Cinematography: Mario Tosi
- Edited by: Paul Hirsch
- Music by: Pino Donaggio
- Production company: Red Bank Films
- Distributed by: United Artists
- Release date: November 3, 1976
- Running time: 98 minutes
- Country: United States
- Language: English
- Budget: $1.8 million
- Box office: $33.8 million

Carrie is a 1976 American supernatural horror film directed by Brian De Palma from a screenplay written by Lawrence D. Cohen, adapted from Stephen King's 1974 novel Carrie. The film stars Sissy Spacek as Carrie White, a shy teenage girl who is constantly mocked and bullied at her school. She later develops the power of telekinesis and uses it to wreak vengeance on her tormentors. The film also features Piper Laurie, Amy Irving, Nancy Allen, William Katt, P. J. Soles, Betty Buckley, and John Travolta in supporting roles. It is the first film in the Carrie franchise.

The film was based on King's first published novel. De Palma was intrigued by the story and pushed for the studio's permission to direct while Spacek was encouraged by her husband to audition. It is the first of more than 100 film, television, and theater productions adapted from, or based on, the published works of King.

Theatrically released on November 3, 1976, by United Artists, Carrie became critically and commercially successful, grossing over $33.8 million against its $1.8 million budget. It received two nominations at the 49th Academy Awards: Best Actress (for Spacek) and Best Supporting Actress (for Laurie).

In 2008, Carrie was ranked 86th on Empire's list of The 500 Greatest Movies of All Time. It was ranked 15th on Entertainment Weekly's list of the 50 Best High School Movies, and 46th on the American Film Institute list AFI's 100 Years...100 Thrills. The film's prom scene has had a major influence on popular culture and was ranked eighth on Bravo's 2004 program The 100 Scariest Movie Moments. In 2022, the film was selected for preservation in the United States National Film Registry by the Library of Congress as being "culturally, historically, or aesthetically significant".

== Plot ==
16-year-old Carrie White is a shy high school student in Chamberlain, Maine, who is frequently bullied by her peers. When Carrie experiences her first period while showering after gym class, she panics, having never been taught about menstruation. Her female classmates laugh and throw tampons and sanitary pads at her until the gym teacher, Miss Collins, intervenes. Her abusive and religiously fanatical mother, Margaret, tells Carrie that her period was caused by sin and locks Carrie in a "prayer closet" to pray to God for forgiveness. At school, Miss Collins reprimands Carrie's tormentors by punishing them with exercise detention, threatening to suspend them and revoke their prom tickets if they refuse. Carrie's longtime bully, Chris Hargensen, eventually refuses and gets banned from the prom.

Plotting vengeance against Carrie, Chris and her delinquent boyfriend Billy Nolan break into a farm and slaughter pigs to drain their blood into a bucket, which they place above the school's stage in the gym. Carrie realizes she can control objects with her mind when she is upset. She learns that her abilities result from telekinesis and begins researching books on the subject. Sue Snell, a classmate who feels remorseful for her part in bullying Carrie, asks her popular athlete boyfriend, Tommy Ross, to invite Carrie to prom. Carrie believes the proposition is a prank, but he insists it is genuine, and she eventually accepts. When Carrie informs Margaret of her plans to attend the prom, Margaret angrily forbids her. Despite her protests, Carrie rebels as Margaret witnesses evidence of her daughter's telekinetic powers, denouncing Carrie as a witch corrupted by sin.

During prom, Chris and Billy hide under the stage while her best friend, Norma, and other conspirators switch the ballots to ensure Carrie wins the Prom Queen title. As Carrie stands onstage with Tommy, finally beginning to feel accepted by her peers, Sue realizes Chris and Billy's plan and tries to intervene. Miss Collins spots Sue and, thinking that she is plotting a prank, throws her out of the prom. Chris and Billy douse Carrie in the pigs' blood before sneaking out of the school. The empty bucket hits an angered Tommy on the head, knocking him unconscious. Norma begins laughing with other students, causing Carrie to hallucinate that everyone is mocking her, believing it was their plan all along. She telekinetically seals the exits and attacks the students with a fire hose, injuring several and killing Norma. A falling basketball backboard crushes Miss Collins after she and the students attempt to carry Tommy's body, and Carrie electrocutes her principal and English teacher, one of the two bursting into flames, setting the gym on fire. She exits the burning school and seals the doors behind her, leaving the trapped staff and classmates to die. As Carrie walks home, Chris attempts to run her over, but Carrie causes the car to swerve and roll over. Carrie ruptures the gas tank, and the car explodes, killing Chris and Billy.

After Carrie bathes herself at home, Margaret reveals that Carrie was conceived when her husband was drunk, an act that Margaret admits she enjoyed. She then stabs Carrie in the back with a kitchen knife. Carrie telekinetically sends knives flying toward Margaret, killing her; then she destroys the house and dies.

Some time later, Sue, who was the sole survivor of that night, has a dream where she goes to lay flowers on the charred remains of Carrie's home. Upon the remains stands a "For Sale" sign, vandalized in black paint with the words: "Carrie White burns in Hell!" Suddenly, Carrie's bloody arm reaches from beneath the rubble and grabs Sue, who, screaming, wakes up in her bed, as her mother tries to comfort her from the nightmare.

== Cast ==
- Sissy Spacek as Carrie White
- Piper Laurie as Margaret White
- Amy Irving as Sue Snell
- William Katt as Tommy Ross
- John Travolta as Billy Nolan
- Nancy Allen as Chris Hargensen
- Betty Buckley as Miss Collins
- P. J. Soles as Norma Watson
- Priscilla Pointer as Mrs. Snell
- Sydney Lassick as Mr. Fromm
- Stefan Gierasch as Mr. Morton

The cast also includes Michael Talbott as Freddy and Edie McClurg as Helen Shyres. Cameron De Palma, director Brian De Palma's nephew, makes an appearance as a boy on bicycle.

== Production ==
=== Development ===
Carrie was the first Stephen King novel to be published and the first to be adapted into a feature film. During an interview in 2010, King said he was 26 years old at the time and was paid just $2,500 for the film rights, but added that he was fortunate to have this happen to his first book. Brian De Palma told Cinefantastique in an interview in 1977:

I read the book. It was suggested to me by a writer friend of mine. A writer friend of his, Stephen King, had written it. I guess this was almost two years ago [circa 1975]. I liked it a lot and proceeded to call my agent to find out who owned it. I found out that nobody had bought it yet. A lot of studios were considering it, so I called around to some of the people I knew and said it was a terrific book and I'm very interested in doing it. Then nothing happened for, I guess, six months.

Lawrence D. Cohen was hired as the screenwriter, and produced the first draft, which had closely followed the novel's intentions. United Artists accepted the second draft but allocated De Palma a budget of only $1.6 million, a small amount considering the popularity of horror films at the time. The budget eventually rose to $1.8 million. Certain scripted scenes were omitted from the final version, mainly due to financial limitations.

=== Casting ===
Many young actresses auditioned for the lead role, including Melanie Griffith. Sissy Spacek was persuaded by husband Jack Fisk to audition for the title role of Carrie White. Fisk then convinced De Palma to let her audition, and she read for all of the parts. De Palma's first choice for the role of Carrie was Betsy Slade, who received good notices for her role in the film Our Time (1974). Determined to land the leading role, Spacek backed out of a television commercial she was scheduled to film, rubbed Vaseline into her hair, left her face unwashed, and arrived for her screen test clad in a sailor dress which her mother had made her in the seventh grade, with the hem cut off, and was given the part. Nancy Allen was the last to audition, and her audition came just as she was on the verge of leaving Hollywood. She and De Palma married in 1979 and divorced in 1984.

=== Filming ===
Filming started on March 1, 1976. De Palma began with director of photography Isidore Mankofsky, who was eventually replaced by Mario Tosi after conflict between Mankofsky and De Palma ensued. Gregory M. Auer, assisted by Ken Pepiot, served as the special effects supervisor for Carrie, with Jack Fisk, Spacek's husband, as art director. The exterior of the White house was filmed in Santa Paula, California. To give the house a Gothic theme, the director and producers visited religious souvenir shops to find artifacts to decorate the set location. Most interiors were constructed on a sound stage in Culver City, California, while exteriors set on the grounds of the high school were shot at Palisades Charter High School.

Auer and Fisk worked closely on a wraparound segment for the beginning and end of the film which featured the Whites' home being pummeled by stones that hailed from the sky. The opening scene was filmed as planned, though on film, the tiny pebbles looked like rain water. A mechanical malfunction botched filming the night when the model of the Whites' home was set to be destroyed by stones, so the filmmakers burned it down instead and deleted the scenes with the stones altogether. The original opening scene is presumed lost. Auer further devised the mechanism to stab Piper Laurie with flying kitchen knives near the climax of the movie. His special effects work on this movie influenced many subsequent horror movies.

The final scene, in which Sue Snell (Amy Irving) reaches toward Carrie's grave, was shot backwards to give it a dreamlike quality. This scene was inspired by the final scene in Deliverance (1972). Rather than let a stunt double perform the scene underground, Spacek insisted on using her own hand in the scene, so she was positioned under the rocks and gravel. De Palma explains that crew members "had to bury her. Bury her! We had to put her in a box and stick her underneath the ground. Well, I had her husband [Fisk] bury her because I certainly didn't want to bury her".

=== Music ===
The score for Carrie was composed by Pino Donaggio. In addition, Donaggio scored two pop songs ("Born to Have It All" and "I Never Dreamed Someone Like You Could Love Someone Like Me") with lyrics by Merrit Malloy for the early portion of the prom sequence. These songs were performed by Katie Irving (neither sister of Amy Irving nor daughter of Priscilla Pointer). Donaggio would work again with De Palma on Home Movies, Dressed to Kill, Blow Out, Body Double, Raising Cain, Passion, and Domino.

The soundtrack album was originally released on vinyl in 1976 from United Artists Records. A deluxe CD edition containing a few tracks of dialogue from the film was released by Rykodisc in 1997, and a 2005 CD re-release of the original soundtrack (minus dialogue) was available from Varèse Sarabande. In 2010, Kritzerland Records released all 35 cues of Donaggio's score for the film on a two-disc CD set which was presented as the complete score. Also included in this edition were the versions of "Born to Have It All" and "I Never Dreamed ..." which were heard in the film, as well as instrumentals of both songs, and hidden at the end of the final track, a version of the "Calisthenics" cue with Betty Buckley's studio-recorded voice-over from the detention scene. The second disc was a remastered copy of the original 13-track album. The Kritzerland release was a limited edition of 1,200 copies. Kritzerland rereleased the first disc as "The Encore Edition" in February 2013; this release was limited to 1,000 copies.

== Release ==
The film opened November 3, 1976, in 17 theaters in the Washington, D.C.-Baltimore area. Two days later, it opened in 9 theaters in Chicago, then opened in 53 theaters in New York City on November 16 and in Los Angeles on November 17. It was released in the United Kingdom on January 13, 1977.

== Reception and legacy ==
On the review aggregator website Rotten Tomatoes, 82% of 157 critics' reviews are positive, with an average rating of 8.4/10. The website's consensus reads: "Carrie is a horrifying look at supernatural powers, high school cruelty, and teen angst—and it brings us one of the most memorable and disturbing prom scenes in history." On Metacritic, the film has a weighted average score of 85 out of 100, based on 14 critic reviews, indicating "universal acclaim".

Roger Ebert of the Chicago Sun-Times stated that the film was an "absolutely spellbinding horror movie", as well as an "observant human portrait", giving three and a half stars out of four. Variety declared the film had "strong production, unusual plot twists and a fine cast." Quentin Tarantino placed Carrie at number eight in a list of his favorite films. In a 2010 interview, King replied that he thought, although dated now, Carrie was a "good movie".

On the other hand, Gene Siskel of the Chicago Tribune gave the film two-and-a-half stars out of four and called it "a crude shocker with a little style", praising the "strong performances" but opining that the movie "falls apart" during the climax which he described as "crude and sloppy".

In the 2010s, the anniversaries of the film as well as the coming-of-age relatability, especially for young women, was talked about amongst critics. The Guardian labelled it a masterpiece.

=== Box office ===
Carrie was a box office success earning $14.5 million in theatrical rentals in the United States and Canada by January 1978 from a gross of $33.8 million. In its first 19 days from 60 markets, the film had grossed $3,882,827. Overseas, the film earned rentals of $7 million for a worldwide total of $22 million.

== Accolades ==
Carrie is one of the few horror films to be nominated for multiple Academy Awards. Spacek and Laurie received nominations for Best Actress and Best Supporting Actress awards, respectively at the 49th Academy Awards. The film also won the grand prize at the Avoriaz Fantastic Film Festival, and Spacek was given the Best Actress award by the National Society of Film Critics. In 2008, Carrie was ranked number 86 on Empire's list of The 500 Greatest Movies of All Time. The movie also ranked number 15 on the Entertainment Weekly list of the 50 Best High School Movies, and No. 46 on the American Film Institute's list of 100 Greatest Cinema Thrills, and was ranked eighth for its ending sequence on Bravo's The 100 Scariest Movie Moments (2004).

Award	Category	Recipient	Result	Ref.
Academy Awards	Best Actress	Sissy Spacek	Nominated	
Academy Awards	Best Supporting Actress	Piper Laurie	Nominated	
Avoriaz Fantastic Film Festival	Grand Prize	Brian De Palma	Won	
Avoriaz Fantastic Film Festival	Special Mention	Sissy Spacek	Won	
Edgar Allan Poe Awards	Best Motion Picture	Lawrence D. Cohen	Nominated	
Golden Globe Awards	Best Supporting Actress – Motion Picture	Piper Laurie	Nominated	
Hugo Awards	Best Dramatic Presentation	Directed by Brian De Palma; Screenplay by Lawrence D. Cohen; Based on the novel by Stephen King	Nominated	
National Society of Film Critics Awards	Best Actress	Sissy Spacek	Won	
New York Film Critics Circle Awards	Best Actress	Sissy Spacek	Runner-up	
Saturn Awards	Best Horror Film		Nominated	
Turkish Film Critics Association Awards	Best Foreign Film		8th Place	

- AFI's 100 Years...100 Thrills – #46
- AFI's 100 Years...100 Heroes and Villains – Carrie White – Nominated Villain

== Related productions ==
=== Sequel ===
The Rage: Carrie 2 was released in 1999. It featured Rachel Lang (Emily Bergl) another teenager with telekinetic powers who is revealed to have shared a father with Carrie. It received generally negative reviews, which criticized the routine recycling of the original film's story and themes. It was also a box office bomb, grossing $17 million against a $21 million production budget. Irving reprised her role of Sue from the previous film.

=== 2002 television film ===
In 2002, a television film based on King's novel and starring Angela Bettis in the titular role was released. The film updated the events of the story to modern-day settings and technology while simultaneously attempting to be more faithful to the book's original structure, story, and specific events. However, the ending was drastically changed: Instead of killing her mother Margaret White (Patricia Clarkson) and then herself, the film has Carrie killing Margaret, being revived via CPR by Sue (Kandyse McClure) and being driven to Florida to hide. This new ending marked a complete divergence from the novel and was a signal that the film served as a pilot for a Carrie television series, which never materialized. In the new ending, the rescued Carrie vows to help others with similar gifts to her own. Although Bettis' portrayal of Carrie was highly praised, the film was cited by most critics as inferior to the original.

=== 2013 remake ===
In 2011, Metro-Goldwyn-Mayer and Screen Gems acquired the novel rights to adapt Carrie to film once more. Playwright Roberto Aguirre-Sacasa wrote the script as "a more faithful adaptation" of King's novel but shared a screenplay credit with the 1976 film's writer Lawrence D. Cohen. Aguirre-Sacasa had previously adapted King's epic novel The Stand into comic-book form in 2008.

The role of Carrie was played by 15-year-old actress Chloë Grace Moretz. Julianne Moore starred as Carrie's mother Margaret White, and Gabriella Wilde as Sue Snell. Alex Russell and Ansel Elgort played Billy Nolan and Tommy Ross respectively. Portia Doubleday was given the role of Chris Hargensen, and Judy Greer was cast as Miss Rita Desjardin. Kimberly Peirce, known for her work on Boys Don't Cry, directed the new adaptation. It was released on October 18, 2013, and received mixed reviews.

=== Television series ===
In 2024, Mike Flanagan was announced to be helming a television adaptation of the novel with Amazon MGM Studios. Summer H. Howell was cast as Carrie. The novel's author, Stephen King was served as executive producer. The series premiered on Amazon Prime Video on October 7, 2026.

=== Stage productions ===
A 1988 Broadway musical of the same name, based on King's novel and starring Betty Buckley, Linzi Hateley, and Darlene Love, closed after only sixteen previews and five performances. The musical is framed as Sue Snell's reliving of the events leading up to Carrie's attack on her classmates at prom, through the device of an interrogation by interviewers who are trying to uncover the details of the massacre. An English pop opera filtered through Greek tragedy, the show was so notorious that it provided the title to Ken Mandelbaum's survey of theatrical disasters Not Since Carrie: Forty Years of Broadway Musical Flops.

Early in the twenty-first century, playwright Erik Jackson attempted to secure the rights to stage another production of Carrie the musical, but his request was rejected. Jackson eventually earned the consent of King to mount a new, officially sanctioned, non-musical production of Carrie, which debuted Off-Broadway in 2006 with drag queen Sherry Vine in the lead role. Similarly, many other unofficial spoofs have been staged over the years, usually with a gym teacher named Miss Collins (as opposed to the novel's Miss Desjardin and the musical's Miss Lynn Gardner), most notably the "parodage" Scarrie the Musical, which hit the Illinois stage in 1998 and was revived in 2005; Dad's Garage Theatre's 2002 production of Carrie White the Musical; and the 2007 New Orleans production of Carrie's Facts of Life, which was a hybrid of Carrie and the sitcom The Facts of Life. A high school production of the musical is the focus of "Chapter Thirty-One: A Night to Remember" second season episode of Riverdale.

== Home media ==
In the United States and Canada, Carrie has been made available several times on DVD format from MGM Home Entertainment, debuting on September 29, 1998, while a "Special Edition" set was released on August 28, 2001. On December 4, 2007, the film was released a part of MGM's "Decades Collection", which included a soundtrack CD. The film was additionally released within multiple sets via MGM; first, as part of the United Artists 90th Anniversary Prestige Collection on December 11, 2007. A set featuring Carrie, The Rage: Carrie 2, and Carrie (the 2002 television film) was released on September 14, 2010, and, as part of MGM's 90th anniversary, the film was included with Misery and The Silence of the Lambs on June 3, 2014.

The film was released for the first time on Blu-ray in the U.S. and Canada from MGM on October 7, 2008, which contained an MPEG-2 codec, with new DTS-HD 5.1 Master Lossless Audio, while retaining the original English Mono, and included Spanish Audio and French 5.1 Dolby Surround. The only special feature on the set is a theatrical trailer. The film was again released on Blu-ray on July 18, 2013, when it was available exclusively through Comic-Con in San Diego from MGM and FoxConnect, containing a slipcover with exclusive artwork. Two further editions were made available from MGM in 2014; a "Carrie 2-Pack" set containing the original film and the 2013 adaptation, released September 9, and finally, a re-issue Blu-ray with a collectible Halloween faceplate, on October 21. Home distribution rights are currently held by Shout Factory, and the film was released via their subsidiary label, Scream Factory on October 11, 2016, in a two-disc "Collector's Edition", now available with MPEG-4 coding, and a new 4K scan. Special features on the set include the theatrical trailer, Carrie franchise trailer gallery, new interviews with writer Lawrence D. Cohen, editor Paul Hirsch, actors Piper Laurie, P. J. Soles, Nancy Allen, Betty Buckley, William Katt, and Edie McClurg, casting director Harriet B. Helberg, director of photography Mario Tosi, and composer Pino Donaggio, "Horror's Hallowed Grounds" – Revisiting the Film's Original Locations, "Acting Carrie" featurette, "Visualizing Carrie" featurette, a look at "Carrie the Musical", TV spots, radio spots, still gallery, "Stephen King and the Evolution of Carrie" text gallery. The set also includes reversible sleeve containing original artwork and newly commissioned artwork from Shout Factory, and a slipcover containing the new artwork. Shout Factory additionally released a "Deluxe Limited Edition" of 2000 copies, which includes the slipcover contained in the "Collector's Edition", with an additional poster matching the slipcover, and an alternative slipcover and poster consisting of different artwork.

Carrie would later receive a "Limited Collector's Edition" Blu-ray of 5,000 copies from Arrow Films, providing the definitive release of the film. The set contained a new 4K restoration, with special features, including commentary by authors Lee Gambin and Alexandra Heller-Nicholas, recorded exclusively for the release; brand-new visual essay comparing the various versions and adaptations of Carrie; "Acting Carrie" featurette; "More Acting Carrie" featurette; "Writing Carrie", an interview with writer Lawrence D. Cohen; "Shooting Carrie", an interview with cinematographer Mario Tosi; "Cutting Carrie", an interview with editor Paul Hirsch; "Casting Carrie", an interview with casting director Harriet B. Helberg; "Bucket of Blood", an interview with composer Pino Donaggio; "Horror's Hallowed Grounds", a look back at the film's locations, gallery, trailer, TV spots, radio spots; Carrie trailer reel; and 60-page limited-edition booklet featuring new writing on the film by author Neil Mitchell, alongside reversible artwork, poster and art cards. The set was released on December 11, 2017. On December 13, 2022, Shout Factory! released (under license from MGM) a 4K Blu-ray with the original theatrical aspect ratio of 1.85:1 widescreen and format SteelBook in United States.
