= Kimberly Peirce =

American film director (born 1967)

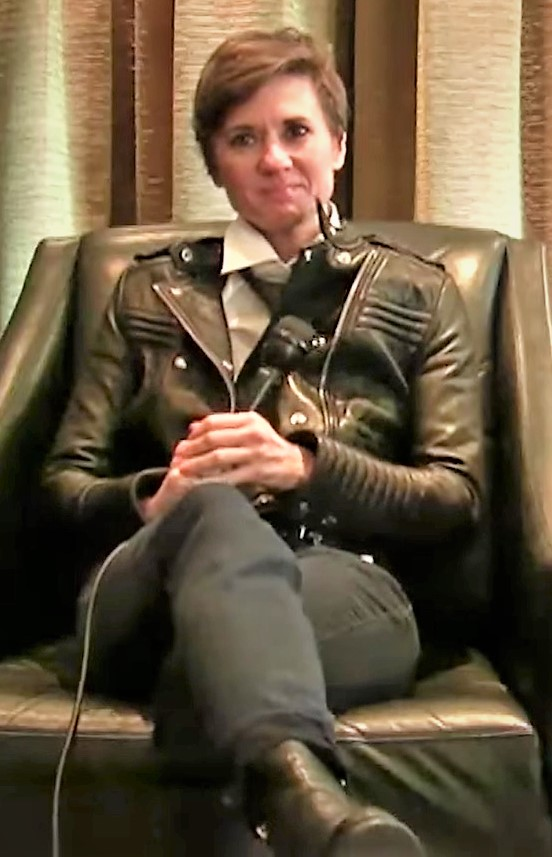
- Peirce interviewed in 2013
- Born: Kimberly Ane Peirce; September 8, 1967 (age 59); Harrisburg, Pennsylvania, U.S.
- Education: University of Chicago (BA); Columbia University (MFA)
- Occupations: Film director; screenwriter; producer
- Years active: 1994–present

Kimberly Ane Peirce (born September 8, 1967) is an American filmmaker, best known for her debut feature film, Boys Don't Cry (1999). Peirce's second feature, Stop-Loss, was released by Paramount Pictures in 2008. Her third film Carrie was released on October 18, 2013. In addition to directing and writing, she is a governor of the Academy of Motion Pictures Arts and Sciences and a National Board member of the Directors Guild of America.

== Early life and education ==
Peirce was born on September 8, 1967, in Harrisburg, Pennsylvania, to Sherry and Robert A. Peirce (originally Materazzi), who owned a construction company. When Peirce was three, she and her family moved to New York City, and at age eleven, they moved to Miami, Florida, where she eventually graduated from Miami Sunset Senior High School.

While attending the University of Chicago, Peirce moved to Kobe, Japan for two years to work as a photographer and teach English. She then moved to New York City to work as a photography intern for Time magazine under photojournalist Alfred Eisenstaedt. She returned to the University of Chicago to graduate with a degree in English and Japanese Literature. Peirce then enrolled at Columbia University to pursue an MFA in film. While at Columbia, Peirce completed an experimental short film called The Last Good Breath, where two star-crossed lovers are caught amidst a world war in which one lover always lives and the other always dies. The short screened as part of the Leopards of Tomorrow program at the Locarno International Film Festival.

== Career ==
=== Boys Don't Cry ===
While at Columbia working on an idea for her thesis film about a female soldier in drag during the American Civil War, Peirce read a Village Voice article about the life and death of Brandon Teena, a transgender man from Nebraska who was brutally raped and murdered when his gender history was discovered. Switching from her original thesis project, Peirce traveled to Falls City, Nebraska, where she conducted research, interviewed a number of people from the town, including Lana Tisdale (Brandon's girlfriend) and Lana's mother, and attended the murder trial of the two homicide suspects. The subsequent short film she made for her thesis in 1995 was nominated by Columbia faculty for a Princess Grace Award, and received an Astrea Production Grant.

After film producer Christine Vachon saw a version of the short, Vachon and Peirce began working on a feature film. In order to fund the writing and development of the feature, Peirce worked as a paralegal on the midnight shift, as a 35mm film projectionist and received a New York Foundation for the Arts grant. With help from the Sundance Institute's Filmmakers, Writers and Producers Labs in 1997, Peirce completed the feature film in 1999. Peirce said, “To make a movie like Boys, I had to be classically trained in film, but I also had to be schooled in terms of gender and sexual identity.”

Upon its release, Boys Don't Cry became one of the most acclaimed and talked about films of the year, opening at the Venice, Toronto and New York Film Festivals and earning many honors, including the Best Actress Oscar, Golden Globe, Independent Spirit award and many other awards. The film received the International Critics prize for Best Film at both the London and Stockholm Film Festivals, the Satyajit Ray Foundation Award for Best First Feature at the London Film Festival, and was named "Best American Feature," by Janet Maslin. Peirce won honors as Best Debut Director from the National Board of Review and Best New Filmmaker from the Boston Society of Film Critics.

=== Stop-Loss ===
In 2005, inspired by the real-life stories of American soldiers, including her own brother, fighting in Iraq and coming home, Peirce began work on Stop-Loss. Peirce traveled the country interviewing soldiers about their experiences and worked with novelist and screenwriter Mark Richard to turn the research into a screenplay.

Released in 2008, Stop-Loss received positive reviews from critics. Peirce was honored with the Hamilton Behind the Camera True-Grit Directing Award as well as the Andrew Sarris Directing Awards for the film. In association with the film, Peirce created a website called SoundOff and gave soldiers and their families cameras to record and share their stories and opinions. Shortly after the film's release, Peirce spoke before the National Press Club and members of Congress on behalf of Soldiers and the Stop-Loss Compensation Act, which financially compensated soldiers for multiple tours of duty served because of the stop-loss policy. The measure subsequently passed.

Much of the inspiration for her two films was said to come from her love of The Godfather: "It showed me that I can take that love of the gangster movie and I can screen it through a family drama. In both my movies family is really important, violence is really important. I'm really interested in the psychological and the authentic portrayal of violence—particularly violence that comes out of emotions. Before The Godfather, I don't know that you could have such a violent psychological film that was that broadly entertaining."

=== Carrie ===
Peirce directed a remake of the 1976 horror film Carrie, which was released on October 18, 2013. An adaptation of Stephen King's novel of the same name, it starred Chloë Grace Moretz in the lead role, with Julianne Moore and Ansel Elgort in supporting roles.

The film won the 2014 People's Choice Award for Favorite Horror Movie. It grossed at $35,266,619 in the US and Canada and at $84,790,678 worldwide.

=== Television ===
Kimberly Peirce has directed episodes of John Ridley's American Crime, AMC's Halt and Catch Fire and Turn, WGN's Manhattan, Bill Broyle's A&E History Channel's Six, Joey Soloway's I Love Dick, Justin Simien's Dear White People,Starz' P-Valley, Game of Silence, Halt and Catch Fire, and Kidding.

=== Other projects ===
On February 16, 2011, it was announced that Peirce would direct the crime thriller The Knife, about two men from opposite sides of the law who must overcome their mistrust of one another and risk their lives in order to infiltrate the organization of a ruthless gang leader threatening to spread armed violence across Los Angeles and the urban centers of America. Peirce was also in negotiations to direct and executive-produce The Enclave, a limited series for USA Network written by Andre Jacquemetton and Maria Jacquemetton (Mad Men).

Peirce co-wrote the script for Silent Star, a murder mystery about the 1922 death of Hollywood director William Desmond Taylor and the scandals that nearly destroyed the film industry. However, the project stalled.

Peirce is set to direct a new Amazon movie titled This is Jane. The storyline is about an activist in Chicago who is unsatisfied with the state of health services available in the US during the 1960s who forms a group that provides education and counseling for women seeking abortions.

== Activism ==
Peirce is a founding member of ReFrame, an industry-wide effort to end discrimination against women and people of color in Hollywood as well as the head of the Diversity Committee for Directors for the Academy of Motion Picture Arts and Sciences. She gave the 2014 Yale Transgender Week keynote, the 2015 Outfest keynote, and the 2016 AFI Keynotes, and spoke at the 2017 Women's March in Park City. She received the GLAAD Media, Lambda Legal Defense, People for the American Way, Lesbian Anti-Violence Project and the 2013 OUTFEST Career Achievement Awards. In 2018, she was honored with a Women in Film award for her activism.

== Personal life ==
Peirce is Jewish and genderqueer.

== Filmography ==
Short film

Year	Title	Director	Writer
1994	The Last Good Breath	Yes	Yes
1995	Boys Don't Cry	Yes	Yes

Feature film

Year	Title	Director	Writer	Producer
1999	Boys Don't Cry	Yes	Yes	No
2008	Stop-Loss	Yes	Yes	Yes
2013	Carrie	Yes	No	No

Television

Year	Title	Notes
2006	The L Word	Episode "Lifeline"
2015	Turn: Washington's Spies	Episode "Valley Forge"
2015	Impact	TV movie
2015	Manhattan	Episode "33"
2015–2016	Halt and Catch Fire	Episodes "Play with Friends" and "One Way or Another"
2016	American Crime	1 episode
2016	Game of Silence	Episode "The Uninvited"
2017	I Love Dick	Episode "The Conceptual Fuck"
2017–2018	Six	Episodes "Tour of Duty", "Ghosts" and "Danger Close"
2018–2019	Dear White People	Episodes "V2: Chapter IV" and "Vol. 3: Chapter III"
2020	Kidding	Episodes "I'm Listening" and "I Wonder What Grass Tastes Like"
2020	P-Valley	Episode "Scars"

== Appearances ==
- This Film Is Not Yet Rated – Peirce talks about the trouble Boys Don't Cry had with the MPAA, particularly the censoring of the sex scenes. Peirce was frustrated over the fact that the MPAA wanted the sex scene between Brandon and Lana removed but were satisfied with the overall brutality and violence in the murder scene.
- Raging Bull – 30th Anniversary Release, Special Features
- Chinatown – Centennial Collection DVD, Special Features
- The Godfather – The Coppola Restoration, Special Features, "The Masterpiece That Almost Wasn't"
- Queer for Fear – 2022 television mini-series includes interviews with Peirce

== Awards and honors ==
- Second place, Canada International Film Festival – The Last Good Breath
- Golden Award, Experiment Division, Chicago International Film Festival – The Last Good Breath
- First place, Suffolk Film Festival
- Best Debut Director – National Board of Review
- Best New Filmmaker – Boston Society of Film Critics
- Young Hollywood Best Director and Best Screenwriter Awards
- Las Vegas Film Critics Society Sierra Award, Best Director and Best Adapted Screenplay
- Satyajit Ray Award, 1999
- London Film Festival, FIPRESCI Prize
- Stockholm Film Festival, Best Screenplay and FIPRESCI Prize
- St. Louis International Film Festival, Audience Choice Award
- Gay & Lesbian Alliance Against Defamation (GLAAD) Media Award, Best Limited Release
- Lambda Legal Liberty Award
- Hamilton Behind-the-Camera Directing Award
- Andrew Sarris Directing Award
- In 2019, Peirce's film Boys Don't Cry was selected by the Library of Congress for preservation in the National Film Registry for being "culturally, historically, or aesthetically significant".

Directed Academy Award performances
Under Peirce's direction, these actors have received Academy Award nominations (and one win) for their performances in their respective roles.

Year	Performer	Film	Result
Academy Award for Best Actress
1999	Hilary Swank	Boys Don't Cry	Won
Academy Award for Best Supporting Actress
1999	Chloë Sevigny	Boys Don't Cry	Nominated

== See also ==
- List of female film and television directors
- List of lesbian filmmakers
- List of LGBTQ-related films directed by women
