= Sneakiepeeks =

- Genre: Situation comedy
- Running time: 30 minutes
- Country of origin: United Kingdom
- Language: English
- Home station: BBC Radio 4
- Starring: Nina Conti; Richard Lumsden
- Written by: Harry Venning; Neil Brand
- Produced by: Katie Tyrell
- Original release: 8 December 2009 – 12 January 2010
- No. of series: 1
- No. of episodes: 6
- Audio format: Stereophonic sound

Sneakiepeeks is a situation comedy series broadcast on BBC Radio 4 between 2009 and 2010. It was written by Harry Venning and Neil Brand and produced by Katie Tyrell.

== Situation ==
The series concerns "Beagle Team", an undercover surveillance unit comprising Bill Cooper (Richard Lumsden), who harbours unrequited passion for team leader Sharla Jasumani (Nina Conti), and the ex-criminal Mark Walker (Daniel Kaluuya). Lumsden and Conti also appear in Venning's somewhat more well-known comedy "Clare in the Community".

The typical mission involves the team attempting to listen in on conversations in places such as hotels, houses, and yachts. The mission is usually interrupted by such distractions as police trying to get their parked vehicle to move on, fallout from Mark's attempts to make money on the side, unexpected numbers of customers for the food van they are using as a cover, and occasional rogue agents from one side or the other.

== Characters ==
- Bill Cooper (Richard Lumsden), the team's technician. His "mission log", spoken aloud, acts as introduction and linkage for the plot, and tends to veer into expressions of his yearning for Sharla, which he then expunges with "delete delete delete!".
- Sharla Jasumani (Nina Conti), team leader. Sharla has a strong Northern Ireland accent and a pugnacious attitude. She has unresolved issues with her superiors in the agency and is fiercely competitive with the other surveillance teams. The head of the department, codenamed "Hunter", is her 'uncle'. In one episode she starts an unauthorised operation to spy on her lover.
- Mark Walker (Daniel Kaluuya), a former criminal forced to work with the agency. He is a streetwise Londoner who excels in talking his way out of situations. He also likes to make money on the side. When the team uses a lunch van as a cover, his culinary efforts attract too much attention, and he begins to dream of a mention in a gourmet magazine.

== Episodes ==
No.	Title	Original release date
1	"Honeytrap Hotel"	8 December 2009
The team monitors multiple rooms in a sleazy hotel where prominent people go for illicit purposes.
2	"Storm Warning."	15 December 2009
From a yacht in a French harbour, the team tries to bug a Russian oligarch involved in oil and gas dealings. Sharla has to get wet, and the French agent they are collaborating with has his own agenda.
3	"Trust"	22 December 2009
The team gets a super-secret mission. Then it becomes clear the target is Sharla's married lover.
4	"Special Relationship"	29 December 2009
A CIA agent joins the team for a mission.
5	"Echo"	5 January 2010
The team find themselves competing with, and being bugged by, Team Terrier from their own department.
6	"Two of Our Spies Are Missing"	12 January 2010
Bill is missing, along with another agent who may have gone rogue (or at least totally insane). The team tracks them to Dubai. Bill is in Wales.
