= Nina Conti =

English actress, comedian, and ventriloquist

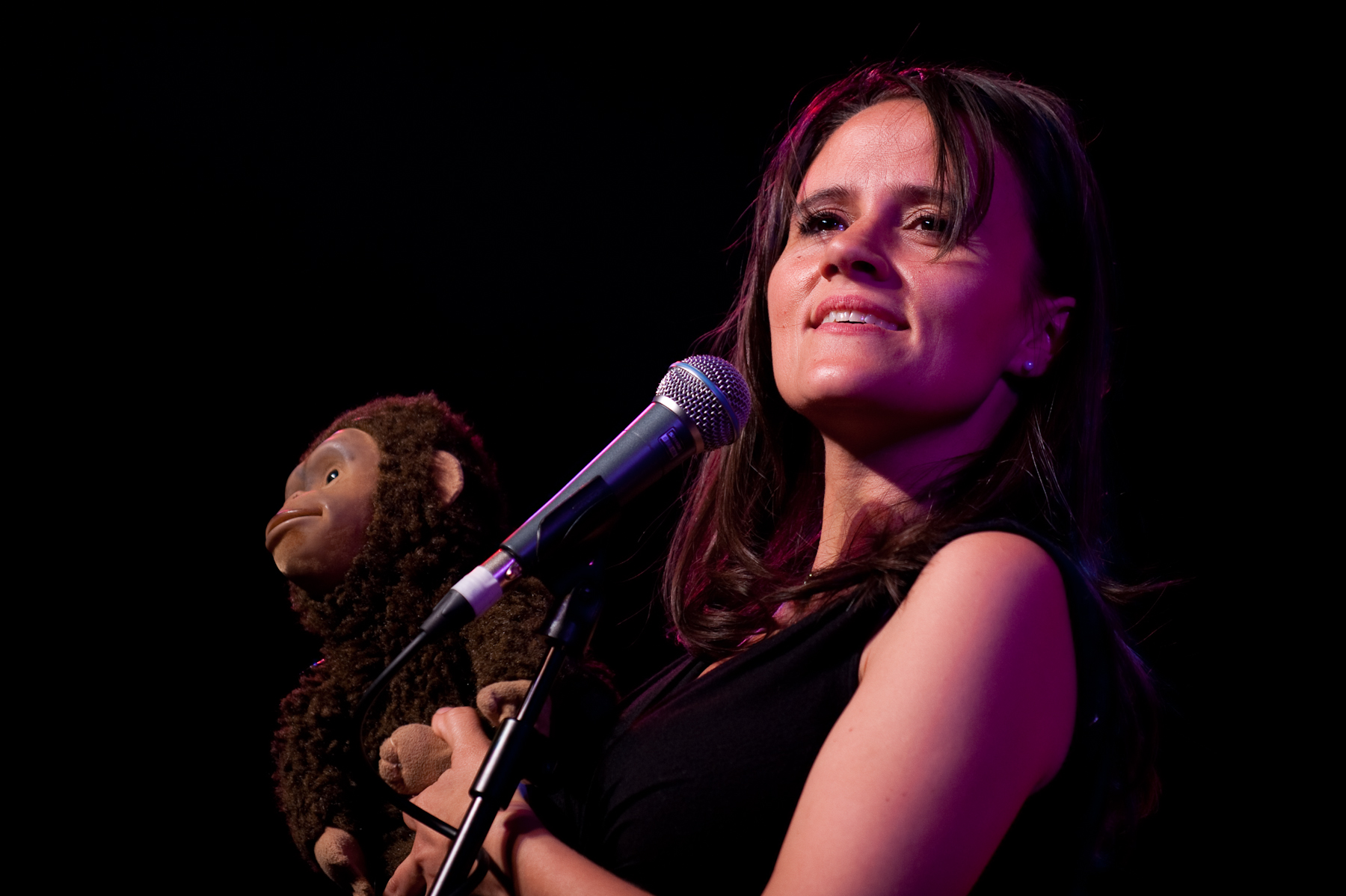
- Conti performing with Monkey at the Glastonbury Festival 2010
- Born: Nina Margarita Conti; August 23, 1975 (age 51); Hampstead, London, England
- Spouse: Andrew "Stan" Stanley (Separated)
- Children: 2, including Arthur
- Parent(s): Tom Conti; Kara Wilson

Comedy career
- Years active: 1996–present
- Medium: Actress; comedian; ventriloquist
- Genres: Ventriloquism, comedy
- Conti's voice from the BBC programme Woman's Hour, 6 July 2012
- Website: ninaconti.net

Nina Margarita Conti (born 1975) is a British actress, comedian, and ventriloquist.

== Early life ==
Conti was born in 1975 and grew up in Hampstead, London, the daughter of actors Tom Conti and Kara Wilson. She attended King Alfred School, London, and graduated with a first-class honours degree in philosophy from the University of East Anglia in 1995. She was inspired and mentored by experimental theatre director Ken Campbell.

== Career ==
=== Acting ===
Conti has worked as an actress since 1996. She appeared in several roles in Daisy and Ken Campbell's 1999 and 2000 productions of The Warp, Neil Oram's 24-hour play cycle, and was a member of The Royal Shakespeare Company 2000/01 company in Stratford-upon-Avon and London. Ken Campbell subsequently devised the ventriloquist play Let Me Out!!! for her, which she took to the 2001 Edinburgh Festival Fringe. She appeared as half-Afghan camera operator Azadine in Henry Naylor's play Finding Bin Laden at the 2003 Edinburgh Festival Fringe. In 2005, Conti voiced Latrina in the animated comedy series Bromwell High.

Conti has appeared in several television shows, including Black Books, Holby City, Single, and the Australian panel show Spicks and Specks. Her radio performances include characters in Radio 4 comedy Clare in the Community.

Conti and her character Monkey portrayed a morning weather team on the fictional "Wake Up L.A." in Christopher Guest's 2006 film, For Your Consideration.

Conti was awarded joint "Best Performance" in the Maverick Movie Awards for her 2012 film Her Master's Voice, in which she took the bereaved puppets of Ken Campbell to a puppet graveyard in Kentucky. The film also earned a BAFTA nomination and a Grierson Award.

In 2013, she portrayed the part of Bea Chadwick in Christopher Guest's HBO mockumentary Family Tree.

Her debut feature film Sunlight completed filming in April 2023.

=== Stand-up comedy ===
In 2002, Conti won the BBC New Comedy Awards, came second in the Hackney Empire New Act of the Year and came third in "Laughing Horse New Act of the Year" competitions.

Conti regularly headlines at London comedy venues and has appeared at The Comedy Store.

She took her first solo full-length show, Complete and Utter Conti, to the Edinburgh Festival Fringe in 2007, where she introduced some new characters as well as performed familiar routines. In 2008 she won the Barry Award for this show at the Melbourne International Comedy Festival, tying with Kristen Schaal.

At the Melbourne Comedy Festival 2010 she debuted a new puppet, an elderly woman who is her "Granny". Conti and Granny appeared in episode six of the ninth series of the BBC comedy quiz show QI in 2011. On that episode, Conti noted that she inherited the Granny puppet from Ken Campbell on Campbell's death.

In 2012, Conti appeared in Russell Howard's Good News with Granny. She also used a mask on an audience member to persuade him to dance. On the series 8 premiere of Live at the Apollo, Conti expanded the act to provide voices for two audience members in masks.

In March 2013, Conti appeared on Let's Dance for Comic Relief with Monkey. She danced to "I Like to Move It" by Reel 2 Real.

In June 2013, Conti appeared on Channel 4's Comedy Gala.

Conti appeared as a guest host on the final episode of the ninth series of the BBC stand-up comedy programme, Live at the Apollo, performing her act with Monkey and an additional dummy-mask routine.

In October 2014, Conti appeared on Channel 4's The Feeling Nuts Comedy Night raising awareness of testicular cancer.

In 2015, Conti appeared on BBC Four's Clowning Around, where she trained to be a giggle doctor and clown, and performed to children in hospitals.

In May 2015, Conti appeared on 8 Out of 10 Cats Does Countdown in Dictionary Corner and used Fabio, the show's regular prop guy, as a dummy.

=== Radio ===
Conti's radio work includes Clare in the Community, Sneakiepeeks and guesting on Parsons and Naylor's Pull-Out Sections.

=== Television ===
Conti's television work began in 2002 with parts in Black Books and Holby City.

In 2003, Conti starred as Mary in a series called Single . In 2005, she voiced Latrina in the Channel 4 animated series Bromwell High. She co-wrote and starred in the show Blunder, appeared in the E4 sitcom pilot Funny Cuts: Golf War, and performed in ITV2's Comedy Cuts in 2006, 2007 and 2008, respectively.

In 2013, Conti, along with her puppet Monkey, played a feature role in Family Tree as Bea Chadwick.

Conti has appeared on Pointless Celebrities twice: 10 November 2018 with Sally Phillips and 30 October 2021 partnering with Tim Vine.

In 2026, Conti appeared in Series 22 of Taskmaster.

== Characters ==
=== Monkey ===
Monkey is a cynical monkey who is continually insulting Conti and swearing when he does not have his demands fulfilled. He often deconstructs ventriloquism by pointing out that he has no microphone, or that all of his ideas are Conti's, and calls it a "dead art". He sometimes shows irritation towards performing on stage and makes Conti laugh at his words.

=== Granny ===
Granny is an elderly Scotswoman to whom Conti refers as someone who is a lot like her own grandmother. Granny often chides Conti for the simplest things Conti has done; for instance, when Conti reveals she has two legs, Granny responds by saying "Oh, two legs? You're spoiling me!" Her main act is to telepathically guess numbers or words, which she always guesses correctly. She also talks about her dead husband, Frank. Granny refers to people with words like "dear", "child" or "my daughter". The original prop was donated to Vent Haven Museum in July 2009, in memory of Ken Campbell, from whom Conti received her, but Conti had a replica made which she continues to use in her acts.

=== Face mask ===
The face mask, rather than a puppet with a personality, is a mask that covers the lower half of an audience participant's face and can be manipulated by a hand-piece held by Conti to make it look like the participant is talking. Conti often uses this to put the participant in awkward and embarrassing situations, such as making them say that they want nothing more than to dance in front of the audience, while their body language suggests the opposite.

== Personal life ==
Conti was in a relationship with the comedian and actor Ken Campbell, from whom she inherited his collection of ventriloquist dummies after he died. She has two sons, including actor Arthur Conti, from her marriage with fellow comedian Andrew 'Stan' Stanley, from whom she is separated.

== Filmography ==
Conti has appeared in a number of diverse forms of media including films, television shows, and shorts, listed below.

Year	Title	Role	Notes
1999	The Colour of Funny	Sally Bismarck	
2001	Zulu 9	Couple – Woman	
2002	Black Books	Kate	Series 2 Episode 1
2002	Holby City	Lindsey Brandon	
2003	Single	Mary	TV series
2005	Bromwell High	Latrina (voice)	TV series
2006	Blunder	Various	
2006	For Your Consideration	Weather Woman	
2007	The Golf War	Susan Oglivy	
2008	Comedy Cuts	Herself	Episode 2.1
2009	How It's Done	Lady of the Book	Short
2009	Peacock Season	Hilly	
2011	Nina Conti – Talk to the Hand	Herself/Writer	Live show 2010
2011	QI	Herself	
2012	Nina Conti – A Ventriloquist's Story: Her Master's Voice	Herself/Director	Documentary
2012	Make Me Happy: A Monkey’s Search for Happiness	Herself/Director	Documentary
2013	Family Tree	Bea Chadwick and Monk	
2014	Nina Conti – Dolly Mixtures	Herself/Writer	Live show 2014
2014	The Feeling Nuts Comedy Night	Herself	
2015	Nina Conti Clowning Around	Herself/Director	Documentary
2015	8 Out of 10 Cats Does Countdown	Herself	Series 7, episode 1
2017–18	Nina Conti in Therapy	Herself/co-writer	8 part web series
2019	The World's Best	Herself/Contestant	TV series
2024	Sunlight	Jane/Monkey	Also writer and director
2025	Spinal Tap II: The End Continues	Moira	
2026	Taskmaster	Herself/Contestant	10 episodes
