= David Gilbert (author) =

American author (born 1967)

- Born: 1967 (age 58–59); Paris, France
- Education: Middlebury College; University of Montana (MFA)
- Occupations: Short story writer, novelist
- Children: 3
- Relatives: S. Parker Gilbert (father)
- Writing career
- Notable works: & Sons, The Normals, and Remote Feed

David Gilbert (born 1967 in Paris) is an American author known for the novels & Sons and The Normals, and for Remote Feed, a collection of short stories.

== Early life and education ==
Gilbert's father was S. Parker Gilbert, the Chairman of Morgan Stanley during the 1980s and his grandfather was Seymour Parker Gilbert, the Assistant Secretary of the Treasury and the Agent General for Reparations to Germany, from October 1924 to May 1930. He grew up on the Upper East Side of Manhattan, graduated from Middlebury College, and earned an MFA in fiction writing from the University of Montana.

== Career ==
His published work includes Remote Feed (1998), a collection of short stories, and the novels & Sons (2013) and The Normals (2005). His writings have appeared in periodicals such as GQ, Harper's Magazine and The New Yorker.

When & Sons (2013) was released after the moderate success of his first, the publisher printed thousands of advanced copies to Gilbert's bafflement. & Sons went on to be nominated for the 2015 St. Francis College Literary Prize and Joyce Carol Oates Literary Prize in 2017. Filming on a feature film adaptation of & Sons took place in late 2024 and early 2025.

== Personal life ==
Gilbert lives in New York City and has three children.

== Bibliography ==
=== Novels ===
- Gilbert, David (2004). The Normals. Bloomsbury USA. ISBN 9781582344560.
- Gilbert, David (2013). &Sons. Random House. ISBN 9780812993967.

=== Collections ===
- Gilbert, David (1998). Remote Feed. Scribner. ISBN 9780684843063.

=== Short fiction ===
Year	Title	First published in	Reprinted in
2013	From a Farther Room	The New Yorker 89/21 (July 22, 2013)	
2018	Fungus	The New Yorker (June 4 and June 11, 2018)	
