= S. Parker Gilbert =

American businessman (1933–2015)

Seymour Parker Gilbert III
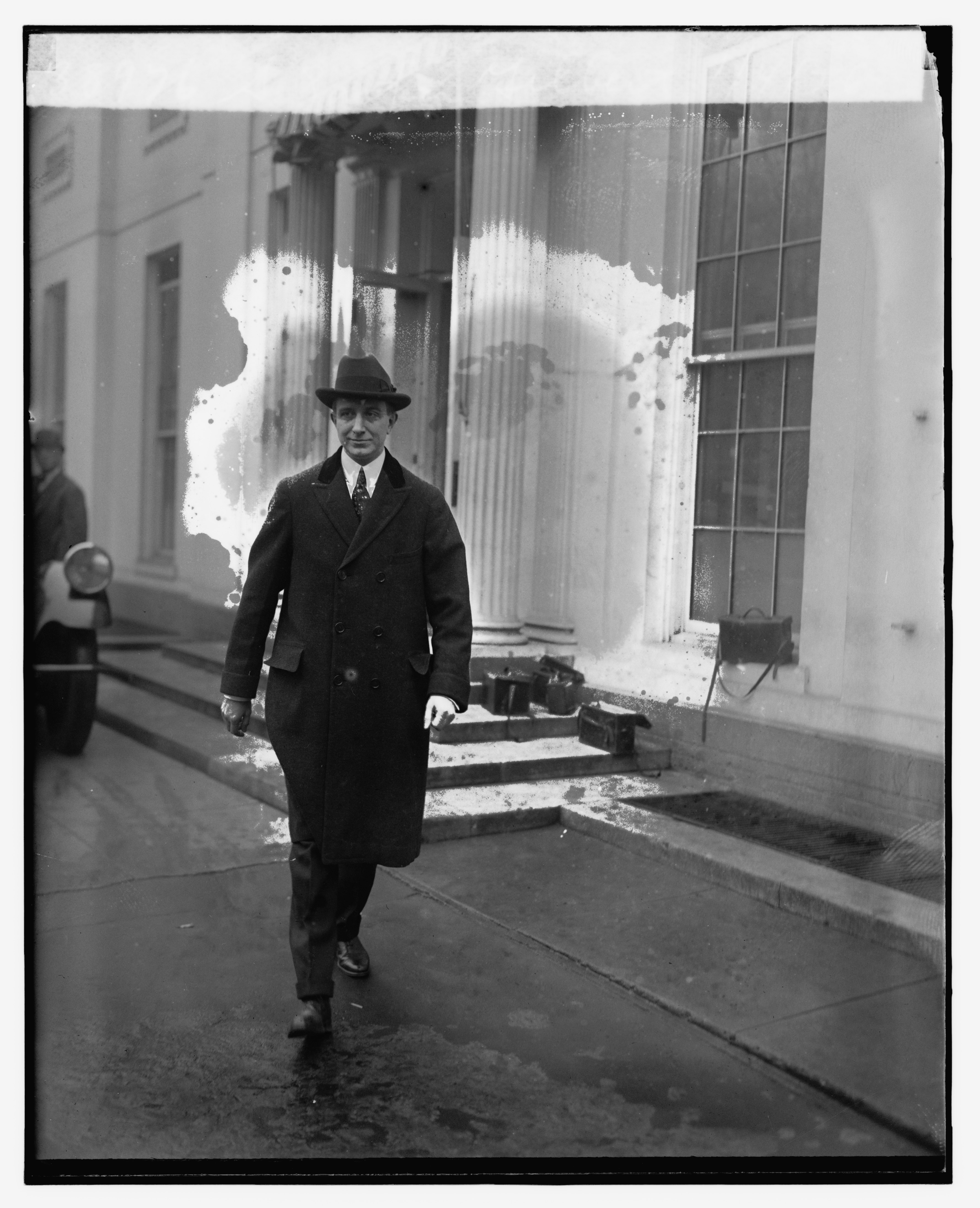
- S. Parker Gilbert
- Born: November 15, 1933; New York City, U.S.
- Died: May 27, 2015 (aged 81); New York City, U.S.
- Education: Buckley School; Hotchkiss School; Yale University
- Title: Chairman of Board and President of Morgan Stanley
- Board member of: Burlington Resources, ITT Corporation, ITT Industries, Morgan Stanley Group, Inc., the New York Stock Exchange, Taubman Centers, Inc., and Bessemer Securities, Pierpont Morgan Library, the Metropolitan Museum of Art, the Alfred P. Sloan Foundation and the Josiah Macy, Jr. Foundation.
- Children: David Gilbert
- Parent: Seymour Parker Gilbert

Seymour Parker Gilbert III (November 15, 1933 – May 27, 2015) was Chairman of Board and President of Morgan Stanley from 1983 until 1990.

== Career ==
While Gilbert was the Chairman of Board and President of Morgan Stanley from 1983 until 1990, the number of employees at the firm grew from 2,600 to 6,800. Equity grew from $207 million to more than $2 Billion. Gilbert led the company through an initial public offering in 1986. Gilbert joined Morgan Stanley in 1960 and became a partner in 1969. He became a managing director in 1970. In 1974, he became a member of the Management Committee.

=== Group of eight ===
In 2005, Gilbert joined with seven other former partners of Morgan Stanley to form the 'Group of Eight'. The Group of Eight is widely credited with forcing the ouster of Philip J. Purcell and his replacement with John Mack.

=== Board of Directors and Trustees activity ===
Gilbert served on the board of directors of: Burlington Resources (1990–2001), ITT Corporation (1991–1995), ITT Industries (1995–1999), Morgan Stanley Group, Inc. (1986–1997), the New York Stock Exchange (1986–1990), Taubman Centers, Inc. (1992-2004), and Bessemer Securities. He also served on the board of trustees of: the Pierpont Morgan Library, the Metropolitan Museum of Art, the Alfred P. Sloan Foundation and the Josiah Macy, Jr. Foundation.

== Personal life ==
Gilbert was the son of diplomat Seymour Parker Gilbert. Following the death of his father, Gilbert's mother married Harold Stanley, one of the founders of Morgan Stanley. Henry Sturgis Morgan, the other founder, was Gilbert's godfather.

Gilbert attended Buckley School and Hotchkiss School and graduated from Yale University in 1956 and served in the United States Army until 1959. With his wife Gail Auchincloss, he had three children. His son, S. Parker Jr., known as Parker; a daughter, Lynn Tudor; and another son, the writer David Gilbert; as well as eight grandchildren. On May 27, 2015, Gilbert died in New York City at the age of 81 from chronic obstructive pulmonary disease.
