= Alex Lowe (actor) =

English actor, comedian and voice artist

- Born: 15 January 1968 (age 58)

Comedy career
- Years active: 1981–present
- Medium: Stand-up comedy, acting, voice acting

Alex Lowe (born 15 January 1968) is an English actor, comedian and voice artist. He is the creator and performer of the characters Barry from Watford on Steve Wright's BBC Radio 2 show and Iain Lee's shows, and the character Clinton Baptiste, originally seen in Phoenix Nights, as whom he has since toured.

== Clinton Baptiste ==
In 2026 - Clinton, a character created by Lowe, will be going on tour with his new show 'Spectral Intercourse' with shows across the UK, including a sell-out show at the prestigious London Palladium.

== Barry from Watford ==
Lowe began calling the Iain Lee radio show on the London talk radio station LBC 97.3 in May 2005, as Barry from Watford. It was during Lowe's first call that Barry's wife Margaret (later to be played by Catherine Tate in Barry's stage show) would be introduced. Barry became popular amongst LBC listeners, who requested that his calls be repeated on future shows.

'Barry "The" Saint-Michael' has been a popular caller on Iain Lee's radio show, which later moved to the radio station Absolute Radio and Talkradio. Since 2006, Alex has also put on live performances called 'Let's Talk To Barry', a 50-minute show telling about life in Watford, which also features audio clips from Catherine Tate and Iain Lee.

In October 2008 Barry called into Harry Shearer's Le Show radio show to discuss the American Presidential election, he was credited as 'Barry Martin', which Shearer later corrected to 'Barry Saint-Martin'. He called again on 4 January 2009 to discuss the recent holiday celebrations, and corrected his name to be 'Barry Barry Saint-Michael'.

In January 2010, Lowe's "Barry from Watford" podcast released on iTunes by Absolute Radio spent two weeks in the Podcast top ten. In October 2012 he co-wrote "BARRY" with Fraser Steele; a pilot sitcom featuring his BARRY FROM WATFORD character for Sky Atlantic, broadcast on 4 March 2013.

Barry currently has his own show on the new subscription radio comedy channel Fubar Radio which was launched on 20 February 2014. He also runs 'Barry from Watford's Bingo Bonanza' at the 100 Club.

Barry from Watford's weekly podcast with Angelos Epithemiou, "The Angelos and Barry Show" was launched in October 2014. On 24 October 2014, he appeared on Channel 4's The Feeling Nuts Comedy Night in sketches as his Barry character, together with Dan Renton Skinner (as character Angelos Epithemiou). The duo walked the streets being comically rude to members of the public to raise awareness of testicular cancer. In June 2015 he recorded his BBC Radio 4 series as Barry from Watford, Barry's Lunch Club. From 14 August 2017, the character of Barry appears alongside Noel Edmonds on the Channel 4 show Cheap Cheap Cheap where contestants have to choose the cheapest item from a selection of three.

== Television, radio and theatre ==
Lowe made his TV debut in 1981 in Thames Television's Theatre Box. On stage, he played Wharton in "Another Country" at the Queen's Theatre, Shaftesbury Avenue, London. In 1983 he played Young Edmond Bertram in BBC 1's Mansfield Park. His career has included diverse roles from serious drama to character comedy. He has worked as both a writer and actor in many different areas of media.

In 1990, Lowe appeared in The Hypochondriac at the Edinburgh Fringe Festival and won a First.

In 1991, having trained at The Studio School in North London and Leicester School of Performing Arts, he played PC Corman in Minder alongside George Cole. Lowe has appeared in a variety of different television programmes, including, Three Men in A Boat, The Rise and Fall of Rome, The Fast Show, Fun at the Funeral Parlour, The Big Impression Christmas Special, and Bremner, Bird and Fortune. He appeared in four episodes of Simon Day's comedy series Grass as precocious child star Crispin Winterville's father Roland. He played Clinton Baptiste in Peter Kay's Phoenix Nights and Sparky in That Peter Kay Thing. He starred with Lee on The 11 O'Clock Show on Channel Four in the late 1990s, usually appearing as a reporter. In 2007, he wrote and performed for Ronni Ancona and Co. for BBC One and performed in The Peter Serafinowicz Show on BBC 2.

In the cinema, Lowe played Paul in Peter's Friends, The Messenger in Much Ado About Nothing and Simon Merriel in Haunted.

On radio, Lowe has appeared on Absolute Power, 15 Minute Musical, Not Today, Thank You, The Laxian Key and The Scarifyers; he plays Brian in Clare in the Community for BBC Radio 4. Lowe has also appeared twice on Loose Ends on BBC Radio 4 with Iain Lee, Big Brother's Big Mouth and Sam Delaney's Stupid Telly (as Barry from Watford). From 2001 to 2003 he hosted Download This for XFM London on Sunday mornings from 10 am to midday.

On 12 October 2008, he reprised his role as Clinton Baptiste in Peter Kay's Britain's Got The Pop Factor ... And Possibly A New Celebrity Jesus Christ Soapstar Superstar Strictly On Ice, a spoof on talent show programmes.

On 22 May 2009, he appeared on BBC Radio 2's Steve Wright in the Afternoon show, talking about his life. He also talked about being a lifestyle guru. He became a regular weekly contributor to the programme.

In April 2010, he recorded a comedy pilot for BBC Radio 2 The Alex Lowe Double Act with impressionist Alistair McGowan. It was broadcast on 15 May 2010.

In 2011 and 2012, he wrote for BBC TV's Watson and Oliver sketch show and appeared in Channel 4 sketch show The Anna and Katy Show as various characters.

Lowe played Adam Wrent on the Framley Examiner podcast on the Framley Examiner website.

Since 2009, he has also appeared in several Big Finish Productions audio plays.

Recently, he has appeared on the Christian O'Connell breakfast show on Absolute Radio. He portrays celebrities ranging from US President Barack Obama, Tom Cruise and more recently Mick Jagger and Keith Richards from the Rolling Stones. Through March to June 2014, he played the role of Jimmy in Fatal Attraction, at the Theatre Royal Haymarket.

In Feb 2015, he reprised his role as Clinton Baptiste for Peter Kay's Phoenix Nights Live at the Manchester Arena

In 2015, Lowe appeared as a policeman in the BBC TV mini-series The Casual Vacancy.

In March 2015, he appeared as The Doctor in Pompidou for BBC2.

Between 2015 and 2018, he regularly appeared on Sam Delaney's News Thing as Jeremy Corbyn.

Lowe voiced major character King Hunnybun in the Nickelodeon UK series Tinkershrimp & Dutch, which premiered in January 2016.

In December 2018, Lowe reprised the role of Clinton Baptiste for a 6 part podcast series Clinton Baptiste's paranormal podcast. A second series has been announced for release in 2019. As of 2023, this is now on series 6..

Lowe appeared on The Chris Moyles Show on Radio X as Clinton Baptiste, initially to promote the podcast series but since has become a semi-regular guest on the show. He also appeared as Baptiste in December 2024 to promote his upcoming tour appearances in 2025/26.

Lowe has also recently started his own YouTube channel - with 1.2k subscribers - where the series Mystic Hunt takes place. Currently, on episode 2 (as of January 2021), the series sees Lowe posing as Clinton Baptiste investigating paranormal activities.
