= Arthur Conti =

British actor (born 2004)

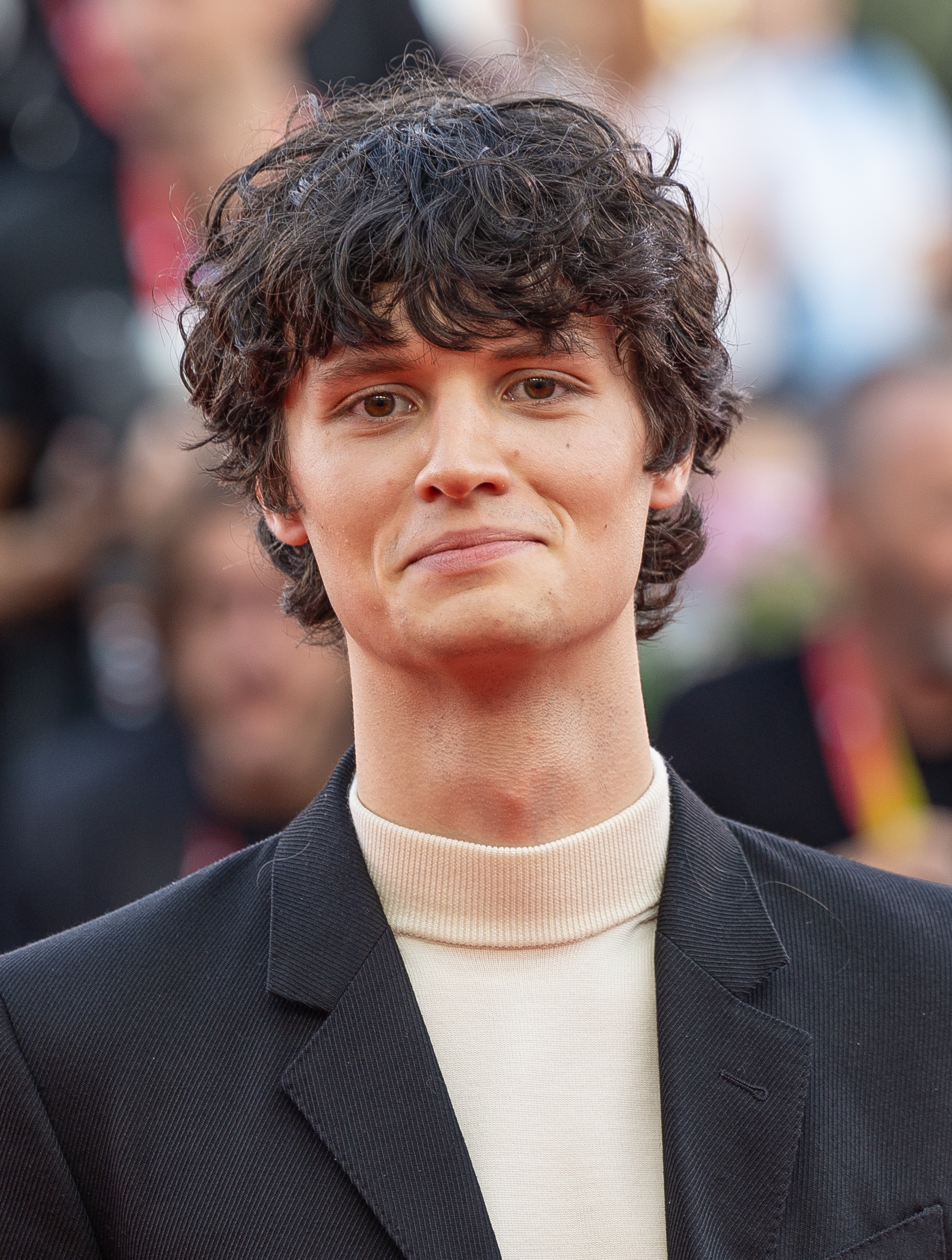
- Conti at the 81st Venice International Film Festival in 2024
- Born: Arthur Stanley Conti; 2004 (age 21–22); Camden, London, England
- Occupation: Actor
- Years active: 2022–present
- Relatives: Nina Conti (mother); Tom Conti (grandfather); Kara Wilson (grandmother)

Arthur Stanley Conti (born 2004) is an English actor. A son of actress Nina Conti, he began his career with a small role in the House of the Dragon episode "We Light the Way" in 2022. Conti gained recognition for his role as Jeremy Frazier in the 2024 fantasy film Beetlejuice Beetlejuice.

== Early life ==
Born in Camden, London in 2004, Conti is the son of comedian and ventriloquist Nina Conti and comedian Andrew Stanley, and the grandson of actor Tom Conti and actress Kara Wilson. He has a younger brother, Drummond.

== Career ==
Conti is a member of the National Youth Theatre, and has appeared in productions of Machinal, Crazy for You and Blithe Spirit. In 2023, he signed with talent agency WME.

Conti made his onscreen debut as the Queen's Page in a 2022 episode of HBO's series House of the Dragon. He went on to play Jeremy Frazier, the brief love interest of Astrid, in the 2024 comedy horror film Beetlejuice Beetlejuice. He had auditioned for the role over a Zoom call with director Tim Burton. Conti was told that he had won the part on April Fools' Day, and thus initially thought it was a practical joke.

== Filmography ==
=== Film ===
Year	Title	Role	Notes
2024	Beetlejuice Beetlejuice	Jeremy Frazier	
2025	& Sons	Emmett Dyer	
2026	Teenage Sex and Death at Camp Miasma	Alex	
2026	Ebenezer	Young Ebenezer Scrooge	
TBA	Egg Baby †		Filming

=== Television ===
Year	Title	Role	Note
2022	House of the Dragon	Queen's Page	Episode: "We Light the Way"
2026	Carrie	Billy Nolan	Main cast
