= Dombey and Son (1969 TV series) =

1969 British television drama series

- Opening title
- Directed by: Joan Craft
- Starring: John Carson; Kara Wilson
- Country of origin: United Kingdom
- No. of seasons: 1
- No. of episodes: 13

Production
- Producer: Campbell Logan

Original release
- Network: BBC One
- Release: 17 August – 9 November 1969

Dombey and Son is a 1969 British TV drama serial directed by Joan Craft based on the 1848 novel by Charles Dickens. It tells the story of a wealthy shipping business owner who, after the death of his wife and only son intended to take over the business, neglects his daughter, only to reconcile with her shortly before his own death.

The series survived the BBC's wiping policy and was released to DVD in 2017 by Simply Media.

== Cast ==
- John Carson as Mr. Dombey
- Kara Wilson as Florence Dombey
- William Moore as Captain Cuttle
- Chris Sandford as Mr. Toots
- Helen Fraser as Susan Nipper
- Sally Home as Edith Dombey & Alice Marwood
- Gary Raymond as James Carker
- Pat Coombs as Lucretia Tox
- Edward Topps as Towlinson
- Fay Compton as Mrs. Brown
- David Garth as John Carker
- Derek Seaton as Walter Gay
- Clive Swift as Major Bagstock
- Joan Haythorne as Mrs. Pipchin
- Roland Pickering as Paul Dombey Jr.
- Victoria Williams as Young Florence

== Archive status ==
Unusual for a black and white BBC series produced in the 1960s, three of the thirteen episodes of Dombey (1, 4 and 6) still exist as their original 625 line videotape masters, whilst the remaining ten episodes had their videotapes erased in the 1970s. All of the wiped episodes survived, however, as 16mm telerecordings. All episodes have high sound and picture quality, with little-to-no visible damage on the DVD release.

== Critical reception ==
Reviewing its DVD release, Archive Television Musings wrote "Hugh Leonard’s adaptation manages to skillfully fillet Dickens’ novel and thereby retain everything of interest. A fine rogues gallery of comic performers – headed by the peerless William Moore as Captain Cuttle – helps to keep things ticking along nicely... [Joan Craft's] directorial style isn't dramatic or showy (there's few of the flourishes that can be seen in Alan Bridges’ Great Expectations) but she still manages to ensure that the story unfolds at a decent pace...Thanks to the first-class cast who rarely put a foot wrong, Dombey & Son is another impressive Dickens adaptation. Highly recommended."
