= Ebenezer (2026 film) =

Film by Ti West

- Theatrical release poster
- Directed by: Ti West
- Screenplay by: Nathaniel Halpern
- Based on: A Christmas Carol by Charles Dickens
- Produced by: Emma Watts
- Starring: Johnny Depp; Rupert Grint; Andrea Riseborough; Sam Claflin; Daisy Ridley; Tramell Tillman; Ian McKellen
- Cinematography: Checco Varese
- Edited by: Ti West; David Kashevaroff
- Music by: Tyler Bates
- Production companies: Motel Mojave; Wattsco; IN.2 Films
- Distributed by: Paramount Pictures
- Release dates: November 1, 2026 (New York City); November 13, 2026 (United Kingdom/United States)
- Running time: 116 minutes
- Countries: United Kingdom; United States
- Language: English
- Budget: $38 million
- Box office: $78.5 million

Ebenezer (also known as Ebenezer: A Christmas Carol) is a 2026 Gothic dark fantasy comedy horror (Note: described variously as a dark comedy, or a Gothic horror film) directed by Ti West, and written by Nathaniel Halpern, based on the 1843 novella A Christmas Carol by Charles Dickens. Johnny Depp stars as Ebenezer Scrooge, alongside Rupert Grint, Andrea Riseborough, Sam Claflin, Daisy Ridley, Tramell Tillman, and Ian McKellen.

An international co-production between the United States and the United Kingdom, Ebenezer premiered in New York City on November 1, 2026, and was released in the United Kingdom and United States by Paramount Pictures on November 13, 2026. The film received mixed reviews from critics, with praise for its production design but criticism for its lack of originality; Depp's performance drew a more divided response, audience reception was notably more positive. It has grossed $78.4 million worldwide.

== Plot ==
On Christmas Eve 1836, in Victorian-era London, moneylender Ebenezer Scrooge works with his business partner, Jacob Marley, and their clerk, Bob Cratchit. Marley suddenly collapses and dies in the office, with Scrooge attending his funeral as the sole mourner and stealing Marley's pocket watch.

Seven years later, a disillusioned and withdrawn Scrooge continues to work with Bob. Scrooge is visited by his nephew, Fred, who invites him to dine with him and his wife Clara. He refuses, and then rudely turns away two men who ask him for a donation to feed the poor, hinting that their charity is a confidence trick and decrying Christmas itself as a farce. At the end of the workday, Bob asks Scrooge if he can take Christmas off with pay. Scrooge begrudgingly allows it, but only if Bob arrives early the next day. When Scrooge walks home, he sees his door knocker has taken the form of Marley's face.

As Scrooge prepares for bed, he hears the sound of chains dragging. Marley's tortured ghost appears, doomed to wander the earth without rest or peace. Marley confronts Scrooge, warning him that he will be visited by three spirits who will try to reform Scrooge lest he share Marley's fate in death.

Soon after, Scrooge is visited by the Ghost of Christmas Past. She brings Scrooge to his old school, where it is revealed that he was isolated and bullied by his fellow students until his sister (and Fred's deceased mother) Fan rescued him. Fan later saved Ebenezer from freezing to death while hiding in a river from their abusive alcoholic father. Ebenezer and the spirit attend a party hosted by his beloved former boss Fezziwig; Ebenezer reveals that Fezziwig was killed in a mugging, hardening Ebenezer's stance against beggars. Later on, Ebenezer and the Spirit review his romance with Belle, seeing a young Scrooge cut his ties with her to instead build his fortune. Scrooge then begs the spirit to send him back home.

Scrooge returns to his home but is then chased down the streets by hordes of ghosts. He enters a pub and finds the Ghost of Christmas Present, who brings Scrooge to the Cratchit house, which Bob shares with his wife Emily and their children, with the youngest, Tiny Tim, struggling to walk with a crutch. After seeing Bob trying to fix the crutch, Scrooge asks if the boy will heal, to which the spirit simply remarks that Tim will die without further help. Scrooge is then brought to a Christmas dinner at Fred's home, where Fred reveals that the only reason for his patience with his miserly uncle is that he is Fred's only living link to his late mother. Ebenezer and the spirit encounter an older Belle and her husband working at a debtors' prison to feed the poor. A decaying spirit reveals inside his ribcage two demonic children, Ignorance and Want. And as the spirit dies, the children break free and chase Scrooge away.

Scrooge then finally encounters the Ghost of Christmas Yet-To-Come, who shows him a future where he is dead, townsfolk pillage his home for items to pawn, his solicitor Topper uses a fake will to steal his business and assets, and Fred and Clara are the sole mourners in his funeral procession. When Scrooge asks about the Cratchit family, he is brought back to the debtors' prison, where the Cratchits now live and Tiny Tim is dead. Scrooge is then taken to a cemetery and sees his crumbling and neglected tombstone. When he demands that the Ghost show his face, he is horrified to see his own rotting corpse and begs for pity, swearing to change his ways.

Suddenly waking up in his bed, Scrooge realizes that it is Christmas Day. He sends a note to Belle, delivered with a copy of her first novel. Scrooge then goes to Fred's house, apologizing to him and Clara and joining them for lunch. The next day, Scrooge tells Bob that he knows about Tiny Tim's condition, and that he has arranged for the boy to be seen by a doctor. Bob refuses the doctor's visit as charity, but Scrooge then announces that he is promoting Bob and renaming the business to "Scrooge and Cratchit." Bob accepts Scrooge's offer. After he leaves, Scrooge sees a beggar in the street. He gives the man Marley's pocket watch and invites him inside for some tea.

== Cast ==
- Johnny Depp as Ebenezer Scrooge, a wealthy and misanthropic businessman who hates Christmas
  - Arthur Conti as young Ebenezer
- Rupert Grint as Bob Cratchit, Scrooge's mistreated but good-spirited clerk
- Andrea Riseborough as the Ghost of Christmas Past
- Tramell Tillman as the Ghost of Christmas Present
- Robert Strange as the Ghost of Christmas Yet to Come
- Sam Claflin as Fred, Scrooge's nephew
- Daisy Ridley as Clara, Fred's wife
- Ian McKellen as Jacob Marley, Scrooge's deceased business partner
- Ellie Bamber as Belle, a woman Scrooge once loved.
- Charlie Murphy as Emily Cratchit, Bob's wife
- Henry Lloyd-Hughes as Topper, a greedy lawyer who writes Scrooge's will
- Freddie Lee-Grey as Tiny Tim, Bob's son
- Eva and Zac Wishart as Martha and Peter Cratchit, Tiny Tim’s siblings
- Richard McCabe as Mr. Leech
- Clare Higgins as Mrs. Dibler
- Rose Williams as Molly
- Nicholas Day as the minister at Marley's funeral
- Christopher Fairbank as Old Joe, the fence who buys Scrooge's stolen possessions
- Michael Culkin as Drood
- Ben Daniels as Thomas

== Production ==
=== Development and casting ===
In October 2025, Paramount Pictures announced a new adaptation of A Christmas Carol, with West directing from a screenplay by Halpern. Depp was cast as Scrooge, while Riseborough joined in an initially undisclosed role. Emma Watts was attached to produce through Wattsco. The film was later credited as a Wattsco and IN.2 Film production, presented by Paramount in association with Domain Entertainment. West, David Reid, Adam Bohling, Stephen Deuters, Jason Forman, Pete Chiappetta, Anthony Tittanegro, and Andrew Lary serve as executive producers.

In November 2025, Tillman and McKellen joined the cast. McKellen later confirmed he played Marley and that Tillman portrayed the Ghost of Christmas Present; he said his own work on the production lasted six days. In December, Grint, Ridley, Claflin, Murphy, Conti, and Bamber were added to the ensemble. The July 2026 trailer and accompanying publicity identified Grint as Bob Cratchit, Riseborough as the Ghost of Christmas Past, Claflin as Scrooge's nephew Fred, Ridley as Fred's wife Clara, Conti as young Scrooge, and Bamber as young Scrooge's girlfriend Belle.

Checco Varese served as the film's director of photography.

=== Filming ===
Principal photography began in January 2026, with London and Dublin listed as production locations. In February, Screen Daily reported that production was underway in the United Kingdom, with Watts producing, and filming taking place in London. Depp and Riseborough were photographed filming together in London during the early part of the shoot.

Location filming also took place at The Historic Dockyard Chatham in Kent. Creative England's Filming in England office reported that the production used the 80-acre historic site as well as additional English locations. The Dockyard has frequently been used to represent historical streets and waterfronts in film and television.

== Marketing ==
Depp appearing in character as Scrooge at San Diego Comic-Con in 2026

Depp presented the first footage from the new film during Paramount's CinemaCon presentation on April 16, 2026. West introduced the footage through a recorded message before Depp appeared onstage. Paramount described the footage as showing a dramatic and stylized reimagining of the Dickens story, while reports from the convention emphasized Depp's physical transformation into Scrooge and the combination of supernatural horror imagery and humor. The film reportedly has a $50 million marketing budget.

The first teaser poster was released on July 23, 2026, followed later that day by the official trailer. Depp promoted the film at San Diego Comic-Con through a surprise appearance in full Scrooge costume. He first interacted with fans at a snow-covered "Scrooge and Marley" installation in the Gaslamp Quarter and later interrupted a Hall H directors' panel to introduce the trailer in character. The trailer presented the film as Depp's return to major studio filmmaking, as well as the first official look at McKellen as Marley, Grint as Cratchit, Riseborough as the Ghost of Christmas Past, Ridley as Emily Cratchit, and Claflin as Fred.

Writing for The Guardian, Stuart Heritage noted that comments responding to Depp's return were largely approving, but criticized the campaign's framing of the new film as his Hollywood comeback.

== Release ==
Ebenezer premiered at the Whitby Hotel in New York City on November 1, 2026, and was released in France on November 11, in Australia and Brazil on November 12, followed by the United Kingdom and United States on November 13, positioning the film as a wide theatrical release during the holiday season.

== Reception ==
=== Box office ===
As of November 22, 2026, Ebenezer grossed $32.6 million in the United States and Canada, and $45.9 million in other territories, for a worldwide total of $78.5 million.

In the United States and Canada, Ebenezer made $6.7 million on its first day, including $1.5 million from Thursday night previews. It went on to earn an estimated $19 million during its opening weekend in North America, debuting at number one at the domestic box office across 3,535 theaters. Internationally, the film grossed an additional $23 million, bringing its worldwide opening total to approximately $42 million.

=== Critical response ===
On the review aggregator website Rotten Tomatoes, 54% of 148 critics' reviews are positive, with an average rating of 5.6/10. The website's consensus reads: "Decking its halls with evocative production design while Johnny Depp is filled with the 'bah humbug!' spirit, Ebenezer doesn't scrooge Dickens' classic tale up but plays things too safe to stand out amongst its long line of remakes." Metacritic, which uses a weighted average, assigned the film a score of 46 out of 100, based on 37 critics, indicating "mixed or average" reviews. Audiences polled by CinemaScore gave the film an average grade of "A+" on an A+ to F scale, while those surveyed by PostTrak gave it an average 4.5 out of five stars, with 63% saying they would definitely recommend the film.

David Ehrlich of IndieWire gave the film a 'C-' rating, calling Depp's performance "insufferable." Mick LaSalle of the San Francisco Chronicle and David Crow of Den of Geek criticized the film's reversal of Dickens' social justice themes, particularly its narrative justification of Scrooge's disdain for the poor and its portrayal of the charitable gentlemen whom Scrooge rebuffs as fraudulent con artists. Peter Bradshaw, in a review for The Guardian, gave the film 3 out of 5 stars, calling it a "perfectly serviceable, faithful adaptation... as Scrooge himself, Depp is pretty good."

Brandon Wu of The New York Times called the film bland and said of Depp's performance, "at his worst, Depp appears as if he is in a Scrooge costume in a Christmas-season ad campaign for Verizon. At his best, he is competent." Matt Konopka of Dread Central asked "who even asked for this?" and said the film felt empty and was "content to lazily copy and paste." Nikki Baughan of ScreenDaily concluded that the film "ends up languishing somewhere in the mediocre middle." Javier Ocaña of El País found a lack of depth and brilliance in West's contribution to Dickens' story.

== See also ==
- Adaptations of A Christmas Carol
