= Sunlight (2024 film) =

British comedy film

- U.S theatrical release poster
- Directed by: Nina Conti
- Screenplay by: Nina Conti; Shenoah Allen
- Produced by: Sam Parker; Will Machin; Keagan Karnes; Tabitha McDonald
- Starring: Nina Conti; Shenoah Allen; Bill Wise
- Production companies: Anyway Content; Metro International; Inspirado
- Distributed by: Vertigo Releasing; Miracle Communications
- Release dates: 17 August 2024 (Edinburgh); 17 October 2025 (United Kingdom)
- Running time: 96 minutes
- Country: United Kingdom
- Language: English

Sunlight is a 2024 British comedy film written and directed by Nina Conti in her feature length debut. It is co-written by Shenoah Allen.

== Plot ==
In Albuquerque, New Mexico, a man named Roy Belvedere attempts to commit suicide via hanging himself in his motel room. Just as he hangs himself, he witnesses someone staring at him in a monkey suit. He later regains consciousness in the passenger seat of his RV, which is being driven by the same person in a monkey suit: a woman who considers her monkey suit as a persona. She explains that she needs to reach a lake in Colorado, which Roy tries to protest. Eventually, they reach an agreement to where Roy needs to reach his mother’s house first as he had sent a suicide note the previous night, and agrees to drive her to Colorado afterwards.

He arrives too late as he finds that his mother, Gail, had drunken herself into a stupor after having an emotional breakdown upon receiving the note. During their argument about Roy’s life and problems, Gail reveals that the gold watch his late father gave him was a fake and he kept the real one on his person, which was buried with him. Angered by this revelation, he decides to drive to the cemetery where his father is buried, dig his grave up, and retrieve the real watch. Upon Roy offering her half of the $20,000 the watch is worth, Monkey agrees to accompany him under the condition that she must be driven to Colorado.

Over the course of their journey, the two began developing a bond, with Monkey beginning to explain herself to Roy about the situation of the woman inside her, Jane, and why she is who she is. She tells about Wade, Jane’s abusive stepfather who is business-savvy and shrewd with forms, and whom she was in a toxic sexual relationship with. Meanwhile, Wade attempts to track her down and try to bring her back as she was the mascot of Wade's nightclub and he deems her to be “mentally unfit” to take care of herself. Upon learning her route and location by using her credit card transaction, he begins to use his bicycle to pedal after her tirelessly. Monkey’s real name is revealed as Jane. Upon stopping for the night, Monkey opens up to Roy further, while also expressing that she wishes to pay Roy back someday and wants him to stay alive. The two spend a tender moment together where she has Roy lay in her embrace, while also teasing him about his erection stemming from their close embrace.

The following morning, the two continue their journey. Along the way, Monkey begins to make advances on Roy, which leads to him fingering her while driving. Upon finishing and pulling over, an uncomfortable Monkey then explains that it was her “other self” that was making impulsive moves on Roy and wishes not for things to become sexual between the two as it would make things complicated for Monkey should Jane find her way to make advances on Roy again. The two continue their journey, still maintaining a close bond.

Eventually, the two finally reach the cemetery where Roy’s father is buried, and the two spend all day digging up the grave. Around nighttime, Roy finally reaches the buried coffin and retrieves the real watch upon desecrating his father’s skeletal remains, and then says his farewells to his deceased father. The two narrowly escape upon being discovered by the groundskeeper. During the night, Monkey confides in Roy that she feels that she may not achieve her goal and that her true self is afraid to come out of the suit as she fears that Roy will not love her the same way he loves Monkey, which he denies and the two embrace.

In the morning, Roy has Monkey shower and clean herself off in a motel while he goes to wash her suit and exchange the watches. Upon reaching the pawn shop, he tries to pawn both watches, but the shopkeeper explains that they were both fake, which causes Roy to exchange both watches for a human-sized wolf suit and then suffer a breakdown, unaware that the shopkeeper had swindled him out of the watch that was actually worth $25,000. Meanwhile, Wade finally catches up to Jane, who is sitting outside of the laundromat waiting for her suit to finish drying. She locks herself in the laundromat and puts her suit back on to become Monkey again. Roy arrives in time and manages to rescue Monkey. Although the two drive away to escape Wade, Roy’s RV is too heavy to drive fast enough, allowing Wade to pedal and catch up to them, beginning a chase. Monkey then suddenly and impulsive leaps out of the RV’s door and lands in front of Wade’s bicycle, which causes her to become critically injured, and Wade is killed by the accident. Roy manages to get her to a hospital and later returns to the cemetery to bury Wade’s body, only for Gail to suddenly arrive and arrest Roy on the spot.

Roy is charged with desecration of a grave site and disposal of a dead body and is sentenced to two years in prison. During an interview between Roy and his old boss from the radio show, Vashti, they recover a tape recorder from Roy’s RV, which was recorded by Monkey, who then unveils herself as Jane to him while explaining the real reason why she refused to leave her suit and reveal herself, afraid that he would not love her the same way, and thanks him for everything. Gail also retrieves the watches from the pawn shop and visits Roy in prison, the two of them now getting along.

Two years later, Roy finishes his sentence and travels to Colorado, where he finds Jane, having finally established her pontoon & banana boat ride attraction as per her wishes, and she finally takes off her mask and reveals her face to Roy. The two then go on a ride on the lake, with the two proclaiming their love to one another. The film ends with Roy falling off of the banana boat.

== Cast ==
- Nina Conti as Jane / Monkey, a woman who worked for her stepfather named Wade as the mascot for his club as a monkey. Having grown attached to the suit and establishing a persona as the monkey itself, she set off to free herself from her toxic relationship with him, meeting Roy along the way.
- Shenoah Allen as Roy Belvedere, an interviewer and radio host for Sunlight Radio, who drives an Airstream RV that doubles as his home. He is initially suicidal and is saved by Jane, which began to establish an unbreakable bond between the two. He is also Jane’s love interest.
  - William Troy Floyd as a younger Roy.
- Bill Wise as Wade, a determined and abusive club owner who is also Jane’s stepfather. Wanting Jane and her monkey suit back, he relentlessly pursues her on a bicycle in an attempt to retrieve her.
- Melissa Chambers as Gail Belvedere, Roy’s mother and a police officer for Albuquerque.
- Estrella Avila as Carmelita
- Bourke Floyd as Everett Belvedere, Roy’s abusive father who had died years prior to the film. He gave Roy a fake gold watch as per a bet, while keeping the real watch on him.
- Rachel Kylian as Vashti
- Asha Bee as Hospital Receptionist
- Lauren Pole as Tanya
- William Stertchi as Mr. Shultz
- Dyron C. Thompson as Cemetery Groundskeeper

== Production ==
The film is produced by Sam Parker, Will Machin, Keagan Karnes, and Tabitha McDonald for Anyway Content, Metro International, and Inspirado. Nina Conti directed the film having written the screenplay alongside fellow comedian and frequent collaborator Shenoah Allen, with the pair also being co-hosts of the podcast Richard and Greta. The plot for the film has been inspired by Conti’s comedy ventriloquist act she performs with her Monkey puppet. The full-size monkey suit was built by creature-effects specialist Vanessa Bastyan and used by Conti during her stage act, then subsequently used in the film. Christopher Guest is an executive producer.

Principal photography took place in Albuquerque, New Mexico and was completed in April 2023.

== Release ==
The film had its world premiere at the Edinburgh International Film Festival on 17 August 2024. The film was released in the United States in New York City on 6 June 2025, followed by its Los Angeles release on 13 June, and was released in the United Kingdom on 17 October.

== Reception ==
On the review aggregator website Rotten Tomatoes, Sunlight holds an approval rating of 91% from 23 reviews.
