= Tom Conti =

Scottish actor (born 1941)

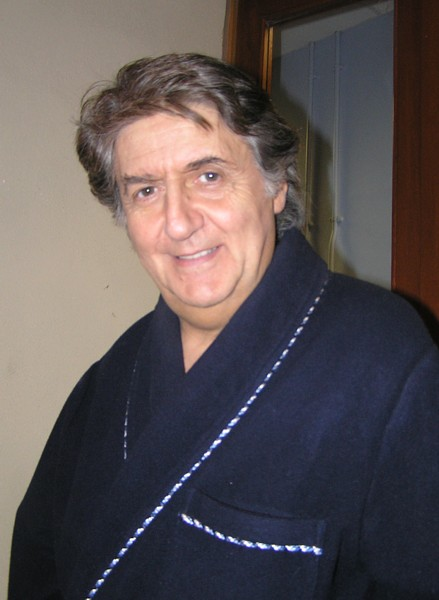
- Conti in 2007
- Born: Thomas Antonio Conti; 22 November 1941 (age 84); Paisley, Renfrewshire, Scotland
- Education: Royal Conservatoire of Scotland
- Occupation: Actor
- Years active: 1963–present
- Spouse: Kara Wilson (m. 1967)
- Children: Nina Conti
- Relatives: Arthur Conti (grandson)

Thomas Antonio Conti (born 22 November 1941) is a Scottish stage, film and television actor. Conti has received numerous accolades including a Tony Award, a Laurence Olivier Award and a National Board of Review Award, as well as nominations for an Academy Award, a BAFTA Award, a David di Donatello Award and two Golden Globe Awards.

He won the Tony Award for Best Actor in a Play and the Laurence Olivier Award for Actor of the Year in a New Play in role in Whose Life Is It Anyway? which he performed on Broadway and the West End in 1978 and 1979. He also directed the Frank D. Gilroy play Last Licks (1979) on Broadway. Conti returned to the West End portraying Jeffrey Bernard in the Keith Waterhouse play Jeffrey Bernard is Unwell (1989).

Conti received, among other notices and plaudits, nominations for both an Academy Award for Best Actor and a Golden Globe Award for Best Actor in a Motion Picture – Drama for Reuben, Reuben (1983). He also acted in such films as The Duellists (1977), Merry Christmas, Mr. Lawrence (1983), American Dreamer (1984), Saving Grace (1986), The Quick and the Dead (1987), Shirley Valentine (1989), The Tempest (2010), The Dark Knight Rises (2012), and Paddington 2 (2017). Conti portrayed Albert Einstein in Christopher Nolan's Oppenheimer (2023).

== Early life ==
Conti was born on 22 November 1941 in Paisley, Renfrewshire, the son of hairdressers Mary McGoldrick and Alfonso Conti. After being raised Catholic, he described himself as antireligious in 2011. His father was Italian, while his mother was born and raised in Scotland to Irish parents. Conti was educated at independent Catholic boys' school Hamilton Park St Aloysius' College, Glasgow; and at the Royal Scottish Academy of Music and Drama.

== Career ==
Conti is a theatre, film, and television actor. He began working with the Dundee Repertory in 1959. He appeared on Broadway in Whose Life Is It Anyway? in 1979, and in London, he played the lead in Jeffrey Bernard Is Unwell at the Garrick Theatre. Besides taking the leading role in the TV versions of Frederic Raphael's The Glittering Prizes and Alan Ayckbourn's The Norman Conquests, Conti appeared in the "Princess and the Pea" episode of the family television series Faerie Tale Theatre, guest-starred on Friends and Cosby, and played opposite Nigel Hawthorne in a long-running series of Vauxhall Astra car advertisements in the United Kingdom from the early to the mid-1990s.

Conti has appeared in such films as Merry Christmas, Mr. Lawrence, Reuben, Reuben, American Dreamer, Shirley Valentine, Miracles, Saving Grace, Dangerous Parking, and Voices Within: The Lives of Truddi Chase. Conti's novel The Doctor, about a former secret operations pilot for intelligence services, was published in 2004. According to the foreword, his friend Lynsey De Paul recommended the manuscript to publisher Jeremy Robson.

He appeared in the BBC sitcom Miranda alongside Miranda Hart and Patricia Hodge, as Miranda's father, in the 2010 seasonal episode "The Perfect Christmas". Most recently he portrayed Albert Einstein in Christopher Nolan's 2023 thriller-drama Oppenheimer. The film had one of the most successful opening weekends of 2023, and received wide critical acclaim.

== Personal life ==
Conti has been married to Scottish actress Kara Wilson since 1967. Their daughter Nina is an actress who performs as a ventriloquist. According to Nina, her parents have an open marriage.

Conti is a resident of Hampstead in northwest London, having lived in the area for several decades. Conti was part of a campaign against the opening of a Tesco supermarket in nearby Belsize Park. Conti put his Hampstead house up for sale in 2015 for £17.5 million after his long-running opposition to the building plans of his neighbour, the footballer Thierry Henry. Conti had also opposed development plans for Hampstead's Grove Lodge, the 18th-century Grade II listed former home of novelist John Galsworthy.

Conti participated in a genetic-mapping project conducted by the company ScotlandsDNA (now called BritainsDNA). In 2012, Conti and the company announced that Conti shares a genetic marker with Napoleon Bonaparte. Conti said that he "burst out laughing" when told he was related to Napoléon on his father's side.

=== Political views ===
Conti considered running as the Conservative candidate in the 2008 London mayoral election, but ultimately did not, and in the following election, in 2012, he supported the unsuccessful independent candidate Siobhan Benita. In the run up to the 2015 general election, Conti said in an interview published in several newspapers that he was once a Labour supporter but had come to view socialism as a "religion" with a "vicious, hostile spirit".

== Work ==
=== Film ===
- Galileo (1975) as Andrea Sarti (man)
- Slade in Flame (1975) as Robert Seymour
- The Duellists (1977) as Dr. Jacquin
- Full Circle (1977) as Mark Berkeley
- Eclipse (1977) as Tom / Geoffrey
- Merry Christmas, Mr. Lawrence (1983) as Col. John Lawrence
- Reuben, Reuben (1983) as Gowan McGland
- American Dreamer (1984) as Alan McMann
- Miracles (1986) as Roger
- Saving Grace (1985) as Pope Leo XIV
- Heavenly Pursuits (1986) as Vic Mathews
- The Quick and The Dead (1987) as Duncan McKaskel
- Beyond Therapy (1987) as Stuart
- Two Brothers Running (1988) as Moses Bornstein
- That Summer of White Roses (1989) as Andrija Gavrilovic
- Shirley Valentine (1989) as Costas
- Caccia Alla Vedova (1991) as Conte Angelo di Bosconero
- Someone Else's America (1995) as Alonso
- Sub Down (1997) as Harry Rheinhartdt
- Something to Believe In (1998) as Monsignor Calogero
- Out of Control (1998) as Eddie
- Don't Go Breaking My Heart (1999) as Dr. Fiedler
- The Enemy (2001) as Insp. John Cregar
- Derailed (2005) as Eliot Firth
- Rabbit Fever (2006) as Prof Rosenberg
- Paid (2006) as Rudi
- Almost Heaven (2006) as Bert Gordon
- O Jerusalem (2006) as Sir Cunningham
- Dangerous Parking (2007) as Doc Baker
- Deeply Irresponsible (2007) as Nate
- A Closed Book (2009) as Sir Paul
- The Tempest (2010) as Gonzalo
- Rekindle (2011) as Dr. Monty Adams
- Streetdance 2 (2012) as Manu
- Run for Your Wife (2012)
- The Dark Knight Rises (2012) as Prisoner
- City Slacker (2012) as Ray
- Paddington 2 (2017) as Judge Gerald Biggleswade
- Oppenheimer (2023) as Albert Einstein

=== Television ===
- Boy Meets Girl (1969) as Frank
- Thirty-Minute Theatre – Revolutions: Fidel Castro (1970) as Che Guevara
- Adam Smith (1972) as Dr. Calvi
- Z Cars (1973) as Gordon Morley
- Barlow at Large (1973) as Myers
- Sam (1974) as David Ellis
- Fall of Eagles (1974) as Glazkov
- Thriller (1975) as Bruno Varella
- Madame Bovary (1975, TV mini-series) as Charles Bovary
- The Glittering Prizes (1976, TV mini-series) as Adam Morris
- The Norman Conquests (1977, TV mini-series) as Norman
- Blade on the Feather (1980, TV film) as Daniel Young
- The Wall (1982, TV film) as Dolek Berson
- Faerie Tale Theatre (1984, "Princess and the Pea") as Prince Richard
- Nazi Hunter: The Beate Klarsfeld Story (1986, TV film) as Serge Klarsfeld
- The Dumb Waiter (1987)
- The Quick and the Dead (1987, TV film) as Duncan McKaskel
- Roman Holiday (1987, TV film) as Joe Bradley
- Fatal Judgement (1988, TV film) as Pat Piscitelli
- Voices Within: The Lives of Truddi Chase (1990, TV film) as Doctor 'Stanley' Phillips
- The Old Boy Network (1992) as Lucas Frye
- The Wright Verdicts (1995) as Charles Wright
- The Inheritance (1997, TV film) as Henry Hamilton
- Friends (1998, "The One After Ross Says Rachel", and "The One with Ross's Wedding") as Stephen Waltham
- Cosby (1999) as William Shakespeare
- Deadline (2000–2001) as Si Beekman
- I Was a Rat (2001, TV mini-series) as Bob Jones
- Andy Pandy (2002) as Narrator (voice)
- DNA (2004) as Joe Donovan
- Four Seasons (2008–2009) as Charles Combe
- Lark Rise to Candleford (2010) as William Bourne / Mr. Reppington
- Miranda (2010) as Charles
- Parents (2012) as Len Miller
- Rosemary's Baby (2014)
- Doc Martin (2019) as Dr Bernard Newton (Series 9 episode 8)
- Midsomer Murders (2022) as Sebastian Cabot (Series 23 episode 2)

=== Stage ===
- Jeffrey Bernard Is Unwell
- Whose Life is it Anyway?
- Savages
- The Devil's Disciple
- They're Playing Our Song
- The Real Thing
- An Italian Straw Hat (1986)
- The Ride Down Mt. Morgan
- Chapter Two
- Jesus, My Boy (1998–99, 2009)
- Present Laughter
- Romantic Comedy
- Rough Justice (2012–13)
- Twelve Angry Men (2014)

=== Stage directing ===
- The Last of the Red Hot Lovers
- Present Laughter
- Otherwise Engaged

== Awards ==
Year	Awards	Category	Work	Result	Ref.
1976	Laurence Olivier Awards	Actor of the Year in a Revival	Dom Juan / The Devil's Disciple (play)	Nominated	
1976	Royal Television Society Awards	Performance Award	The Glittering Prizes	Won	
1977	British Academy Television Awards	Best Actor	The Glittering Prizes	Nominated	
1978	Laurence Olivier Awards	Actor of the Year in a New Play	Whose Life Is It Anyway?	Won	
1979	Tony Awards	Best Actor in a Play	Whose Life Is It Anyway?	Won	
1980	Laurence Olivier Awards	Best Actor in a Musical	They're Playing Our Song	Nominated	
1983	National Board of Review	Best Actor	Merry Christmas, Mr. Lawrence / Reuben, Reuben	Won	
1984	Academy Awards	Best Actor	Reuben, Reuben	Nominated	
1984	Golden Globe Awards	Best Actor in a Motion Picture – Drama	Reuben, Reuben	Nominated	
1987	Golden Globe Awards	Best Supporting Actor – Series, Miniseries or Television Film	Nazi Hunter: The Beate Klarsfeld Story	Nominated	

== See also ==
- List of Academy Award winners and nominees from Great Britain
