= Kara Wilson =

Scottish actress (born 1944)

- Born: 18 June 1944 (age 82); Glasgow, Scotland
- Occupation: Actress
- Years active: 1964–2011
- Spouse: Tom Conti (m. 1967)
- Children: Nina Conti
- Relatives: Arthur Conti (grandson)

Kara Wilson (born 18 June 1944) is a Scottish actress best known for her roles as Patience Heatherstone in the 1964 television adaptation of The Children of the New Forest and as Miss Caroline Gordon in the seventh series of children's soap opera Grange Hill.

== Career ==
=== Acting ===
Wilson has acted in numerous productions with the Glasgow University Dramatic Society, playing leading roles in Lysistrata, Strindberg's The Stronger, Arthur Miller's The Crucible, and Shakespeare's Love's Labour's Lost. As the Society's president, she ran a small theatre company and took productions to both the Edinburgh and Student Drama Festivals.

Wilson first appeared on television in an adaptation of Frederick Marryat's novel The Children of the New Forest. She appeared in several small roles in many television series' throughout the 1960s, appearing in Dombey and Son in 1969 and the 1970 film adaptation of Jane Eyre. She also appeared as Helen Smith in Adam Smith between 1972 and 1973, as Miss Gordon the Art teacher in Grange Hill and as Jean Mackenzie in Mackenzie.

In 1993, Wilson co-wrote and performed "The Story of Robert Burns", a program of songs, verse and anecdotes about the Scottish poet. In 1994 she wrote and performed "The Young Pretender," the story of Bonnie Prince Charlie, and took this production to the Borders Festival in Scotland in October 1995 with her daughter.

In 1999, Wilson performed in the one-woman show Deco Diva, about art deco artist Tamara de Lempicka, which played in New York and at the Edinburgh Festival Fringe.

=== As an artist ===
Wilson took up painting and studied at Camden Arts Centre where she remained off and on for ten years. In recent years she has had several exhibitions of her paintings, including one at the Netherbow at the Edinburgh Festival. In 1992 she exhibited with other artists at the Hooper Gallery, St John's Wood and in 1993 at the Wabe Gallery, Hampstead.

== Personal life ==
Wilson was educated at The Park School in Glasgow, and later majored in psychology at the University of Glasgow.

Wilson married fellow Scottish actor Tom Conti in 1967, and the couple have a daughter, the actress and ventriloquist Nina Conti, born to the couple in 1975.
