= Adam Smith (TV series) =

- Genre: Drama
- Written by: Trevor Griffiths; C.P. Taylor; James MacTaggart
- Starring: Andrew Keir; Kara Wilson; Freddie Earlle; Tom Conti
- Country of origin: United Kingdom
- Original language: English
- No. of series: 2
- No. of episodes: 39

Production
- Producers: June Howson; Baz Taylor
- Running time: 30 minutes
- Production company: Granada Television

Original release
- Network: ITV
- Release: 23 January 1972 – 25 March 1973

Adam Smith is a 1972 British series. Most episodes were written by Trevor Griffiths. The lead character was supposedly inspired by Denis Forman. It contains one of the last performances of Janet Munro.

== Plot ==
A Scots minister, following his wife's death, questions the purpose of his local ministry but finds it in his spiritual work for the community.

== Cast ==
- Andrew Keir
- Brigit Forsyth
- Janet Munro
- Tom Conti
- Kara Wilson
- David Langton
- Maggie Jordan
- John Young
- Michael Elphick
