= & Sons =

2025 film

- Theatrical release poster
- Directed by: Pablo Trapero
- Screenplay by: Sarah Polley
- Based on: & Sons by David Gilbert
- Produced by: Phin Glynn; Axel Kuschevatzy; Cindy Teperman; Pablo Trapero; Christina Piovesan; Emily Kulasa; Trudie Styler; Celine Rattray; Jackie Donohoe; Manu Fabeiro; Alejandro Roemmers; Carlos Garde
- Starring: Bill Nighy; Noah Jupe; George MacKay; Johnny Flynn; Anna Geislerová; Arthur Conti; Shalom Brune-Franklin; Dominic West; Imelda Staunton
- Cinematography: Diego Dussuel
- Edited by: Pablo Trapero; Gemma Cabello; Thom Smalley
- Music by: Cristobal Tapia de Veer
- Production companies: Infinity Hill; Matanza Cine; Elevation Pictures
- Distributed by: Icon Film Distribution (United Kingdom); Elevation Pictures (Canada)
- Release dates: September 7, 2025 (TIFF); August 21, 2026 (United Kingdom); October 30, 2026 (Canada)
- Running time: 120 minutes
- Countries: United States; United Kingdom; Canada
- Language: English

& Sons is a 2025 drama film directed by Pablo Trapero and written by Sarah Polley. It is an adaptation of the novel of the same name by David Gilbert. It has an ensemble cast including Johnny Flynn, Bill Nighy, George MacKay, Imelda Staunton, Dominic West and Noah Jupe.

The film had its world premiere in the Special Presentations section of the Toronto International Film Festival on September 7, 2025.

== Premise ==
The estranged sons of a reclusive novelist are called to meet him after he becomes convinced he is about to die.

== Cast ==
- Bill Nighy as Andrew Dyer
- Noah Jupe as Andy Dyer
- George MacKay as Jamie Dyer
- Johnny Flynn as Richard Dyer
- Imelda Staunton as Isabel Platt
- Dominic West as Rainer
- Anna Geislerová as Gerde
- Arthur Conti as Emmett Dyer
- Charlotte Dauphin as Lucy
- Shalom Brune-Franklin

== Production ==
It was reported in May 2024 that an adaptation of the novel & Sons by David Gilbert was to be directed by Pablo Trapero from a screenplay written by Sarah Polley. The film is produced by Phin Glynn, Axel Kuschevatzky, and Cindy Teperman of Infinity Hill. Trapero also produces via Matanza Cine. Matt Smith, Bill Nighy, George MacKay, and Noah Jupe lead the cast. Later, Elevation Pictures' Christina Piovesan and Emily Kulasa joined as co-producers and Imelda Staunton, Johnny Flynn and Dominic West joined the cast, as did Anna Geislerová and Arthur Conti with Matt Smith no longer reported as a member of the cast.

Principal photography took place in the United Kingdom in December 2024. Filming locations included Oxford in January 2025. The film was in post-production by February 2025.

== Release ==
The film screened in non-competitive section 'Grand public' of the 20th Rome Film Festival in October 2025. Icon Film Distribution released the film in the United Kingdom on August 21, 2026. Elevation Pictures released the film in Canada on October 30.

== Reception ==
On the review aggregator website Rotten Tomatoes, 54% of 26 critics' reviews are positive, with an average rating of 5.4/10.

Peter Bradshaw of The Guardian gave the film two out of five stars and felt that it's "nebulous and laborious". Richard Crouse was more positive and gave the film three and a half out of five stars. He wrote that it's "uncompromising, but often very funny".
