= Seymour Parker Gilbert =

American lawyer, banker, politician and diplomat (1892–1938)

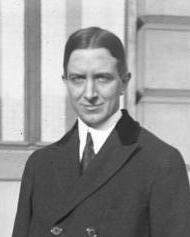
- Photo from 1931

Assistant Secretary of the Treasury
- In office June 1920 – June 1921
- Preceded by: Russell Cornell Leffingwell

Under Secretary of the Treasury
- In office June 1921 – 1923
- Preceded by: Inaugural holder
- Succeeded by: Garrard Winston

Agent General of Reparations
- In office October 1924 – May 1930

Personal details
- Born: October 13, 1892 Bloomfield, NJ
- Died: February 23, 1938 (aged 45) New York City
- Education: Rutgers College; Harvard Law School

Seymour Parker Gilbert (October 13, 1892 - February 23, 1938) was an American lawyer, banker, politician and diplomat. He is chiefly known for being Agent General for Reparations Payments from October 1924 to May 1930, working to facilitate and ensure Germany's reparations payments to the Allies after World War One. Afterwards, in 1931, he became an associate at J. P. Morgan.

== Early life ==
Parker Gilbert was the son of Seymour Parker and Carrie Jennings (née Cooper) Gilbert. Gilbert was educated at Rutgers College, graduating at the age of 19, and received a L.L.B. from Harvard Law School at 22, where he was the editor of the Harvard Law Review from 1913 to 1915. He also received an honorary degree from Harvard in 1930 for his work in reparations.

== Career ==
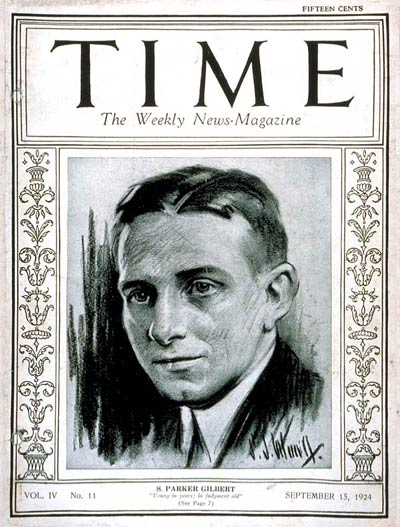
Time cover, 15 Sep 1924

From 1915 to 1918, he practiced law with Cravath and Henderson in New York.

At age 27, he was offered a post in the Wilson Administration as Assistant Secretary of the Treasury, and continued to serve in the Harding Administration as Under Secretary of the Treasury from June 1921 – 1923.

In October 1924, possibly because of his close association with J. P. Morgan, Gilbert was appointed Agent General for Reparations by the Allied Reparation Commission, succeeding the temporary Owen D. Young. In that capacity, he was responsible for the execution of the Dawes Plan, working with Weimar Germany to ensure payment of reparations required by the Treaty of Versailles. He served until May 1930 and was said to have fulfilled his duties "with considerable skill and impartiality."

Under the Young Plan, which succeeded the Dawes Plan, the Bank for International Settlements was created, nullifying Gilbert's position.

Afterwards, in 1931, Gilbert became an associate at the J. P. Morgan firm, where he was known to put in long hours.

== Personal life ==
Gilbert died at age 45, from a heart attack. His son S. Parker Gilbert, born in 1934, was chairman of Morgan Stanley during the 1980s. After his death, his wife, Louise Todd, married Harold Stanley, the co-founder of Morgan Stanley.

Awards and achievements
Preceded by Gen. Wu Pei-fu	Cover of Time Magazine; 15 September 1924	Succeeded by Leo H. Baekeland
