= Clare in the Community =

British radio series (2004–2019)

- Genre: Sitcom
- Running time: 30 mins
- Country of origin: United Kingdom
- Language: English
- Home station: BBC Radio 4
- Syndicates: BBC Radio 4 Extra
- Starring: Sally Phillips; Alex Lowe; Nina Conti
- Created by: Harry Venning
- Written by: Harry Venning; David Ramsden
- Produced by: Katie Tyrell (series 1–8, Es); Alexandra Smith (series 9, CW, 10–11)
- Original release: 26 November 2004 – 29 October 2019
- No. of series: 12
- No. of episodes: 72
- Website: www.bbc.co.uk/programmes/b006qprs

Clare in the Community is a British radio comedy series, broadcast on BBC Radio 4, starring Sally Phillips as Clare. It was adapted from the comic strip of the same name which appeared in The Guardian newspaper, written by Harry Venning. The title is a play on words relating to care in the community.

Clare is a social worker who likes to sort out other people's problems while ignoring her own. She is white, middle class and heterosexual, but does not like to be reminded of it. She is a control freak but both her personal and professional lives are out of control.

== TV pilot ==
In 2002 ITV commissioned a sitcom based on Harry Venning's comic strip. Two episodes were commissioned and a pilot episode, written by Venning and David Ramsden and starring Julia Sawalha in the title role, was produced by Tiger Aspect. The pilot was not picked up for a full series and has never been broadcast.

== Radio series ==
In 2004 a radio sitcom, co-written by David Ramsden and produced by Katie Tyrrell, was made for BBC Radio 4, starring Sally Phillips as Clare and Alex Lowe as her husband Brian. Repeats have also been broadcast on BBC7 (now Radio 4 Extra). Series 1 to 5 have been released on CD by BBC Audio. Series 6 was broadcast in 2010. Series 7 was broadcast in 2011. The first series won the Bronze Comedy Award at the 2005 Sony Radio Awards.

The series occasionally breaks the fourth wall, with references to (for instance) a comic strip in The Guardian's social-work supplement which (the somewhat humourless) Clare does not understand, an old schoolmate of Brian's named Richard Lumsden who wanted to be an actor but was never heard of again, and Nina Conti (as Nali) being given the line "It's not like I'm a ventriloquist." The final series in particular breaks the fourth wall in nearly every episode, with Clare and Brian trying to remember how old their son is now in the first episode (reflecting how his age fluctuates slightly in different series), Joanie believing (or realising) that she is trapped in a pre-scripted comedy series, "comedienne and ventriloquist Nina Conti" being a member on the panel of a (fictional) episode of Any Questions? that Clare and Mrs. Singh attend, and in the final episode, where Nali (played by Conti) is seemingly a terrorist holding Clare hostage, she comments, in each relevant voice, that she could just as easily be Maggie or various other characters that Conti has voiced over the course of the series.

Clare often brings home her work problems which is just one of the main reasons why her relationship with Brian struggles. They often attend couples-counselling classes. Clare not only wears the trousers in their relationship but her self-centred neglect of Brian stresses him out. He often talks to his libertine friend and fellow schoolteacher Simon about her.

Clare's fellow social workers are often involved in her storylines. These include the rich yet unhygienic gay man Ray and Megan, Clare's Scottish single mother-of-one former student. Helen, the laziest of the workers, is played by three actresses over the series; in series 6 team leader, Irene, a black woman, is replaced by Libby, "an Aussie and a lesbo—and proud of both".

Although she has a son, Clare leaves her child duties primarily to her husband Brian and Nali. Despite their child, both continue to argue and have problems in their relationship. In series 9, Clare leaves Brian only to return to him in the series finale after her love interest has shown little knowledge of who she is.

Simon Elmes called it "an instant hit, capturing the PC tone of our times". The Stage reviewed series 8 positively, praising the first episode as "a brilliant opener", and after the series finale calling it "the best comedy on radio" and Phillips "the mistress of comic timing".

The twelfth series was announced in a trailer as the final series.

== Cast ==
Character	Series 1	Series 2	Series 3	Series 4	Series 5	Series 6	Series 7	Series 8	Series 9	Series 10	Series 11	Series 12
Clare Barker	Sally Phillips	Sally Phillips	Sally Phillips	Sally Phillips	Sally Phillips	Sally Phillips	Sally Phillips	Sally Phillips	Sally Phillips	Sally Phillips	Sally Phillips	Sally Phillips
Brian Harris	Alex Lowe	Alex Lowe	Alex Lowe	Alex Lowe	Alex Lowe	Alex Lowe	Alex Lowe	Alex Lowe	Alex Lowe	Alex Lowe	Alex Lowe	Alex Lowe
Megan Whardby	Nina Conti	Nina Conti	Nina Conti	Nina Conti	Nina Conti	Nina Conti	Nina Conti	Nina Conti	Nina Conti	Nina Conti		
Helen Golightly	Gemma Craven	Gemma Craven	Gemma Craven	Gemma Craven	Liza Tarbuck	Liza Tarbuck	Liza Tarbuck	Liza Tarbuck	Liza Tarbuck	Pippa Haywood		
Ray Bishop	Richard Lumsden	Richard Lumsden	Richard Lumsden	Richard Lumsden	Richard Lumsden	Richard Lumsden	Richard Lumsden	Richard Lumsden	Richard Lumsden	Richard Lumsden	Richard Lumsden	Richard Lumsden
Irene	Ellen Thomas	Ellen Thomas	Ellen Thomas	Ellen Thomas	Ellen Thomas							
Simon Burrows	Andrew Wincott	Andrew Wincott	Andrew Wincott	Andrew Wincott	Andrew Wincott	Philip Pope	Andrew Wincott	Andrew Wincott	Andrew Wincott	Andrew Wincott	Andrew Wincott	Andrew Wincott
Nali "Ramsbottom" Jakovlivicz					Nina Conti	Nina Conti	Nina Conti	Nina Conti	Nina Conti	Nina Conti	Nina Conti	Nina Conti
Libby Prentice						Sarah Kendall	Sarah Kendall	Sarah Kendall	Sarah Kendall	Sarah Kendall	Sarah Kendall	Sarah Kendall
Joan Hastings								Sarah Thom	Sarah Thom	Sarah Thom	Sarah Thom	Sarah Thom
Mrs Singh											Nina Wadia	Nina Wadia
Cilla Yeboah											Gbemisola Ikumelo	Gbemisola Ikumelo

== Episodes ==
=== Series one ===
No. overall	No. in series	Title	Original release date
1	1	"Babysitter"	26 November 2004
Clare is tricked into looking after Helen's difficult teenage son, but after an awkward start they become friends.
2	2	"Adoption"	3 December 2004
A couple moves into the flat above, and Clare and Brian are kept awake by noisy sex.
3	3	"Glad to be Ray"	10 December 2004
Clare feels that Ray is too insular and wonders why she has never been invited to his flat. She drops round uninvited when an opportunity arises.
4	4	"Last Words"	17 December 2004
Clare uses the funeral of one of her clients, a cantankerous old woman, as a reason to take the afternoon off. Simon asks Megan out, but Brian's intervention ensures their first date is also their last.
5	5	"Combat Zone"	24 December 2004
Clare and Brian get stranded in a rough part of town when their car runs out of petrol.
6	6	"Stage Fright"	31 December 2004
Brian writes a play for his school drama club which suspiciously resembles his own life: the study of a misunderstood man in a relationship with a cold, unreasonable woman, and seeks sympathy from a young Scottish woman.

=== Series two ===
No. overall	No. in series	Title	Original release date
7	1	"Past Caring"	4 November 2005
Clare meets a glamorous old acquaintance who seems to know her but Clare cannot recall her; Clare's workmates go out for Brian's birthday meal.
8	2	"Relax"	11 November 2005
Brian takes Clare on holiday hoping to ask her to marry him. Clare does not think the Sparrowhawk centre can function without her and finds ways to phone in to check. Unfortunately Brian chooses a location with no telephone signal.
9	3	"Meet the Press"	18 November 2005
Clare is delighted to be asked to do an interview for Woman's Hour; Brian has trouble with an unscrupulous pupil who was disappointed she did not get the lead in the school play.
10	4	"Brian Come Home"	25 November 2005
Brian storms out after an argument and moves in with Simon. Irene accompanies Ray to a seance in an effort for him to contact his late mother.
11	5	"Mean Streets"	2 December 2005
Clare and her workmates help count homeless people, but it becomes competitive. Brian organises a stag-do for Simon involving a stripper.
12	6	"Doolah's Choice"	9 December 2005
Helen seems to walk out on Simon on the eve of her wedding so she can meet an old flame. Clare has her "whale music" prepared for Megan when she gives birth.

=== Series three ===
At the start of the series, Clare and Brian are staying at Simon's flat. Megan's daughter Brenda is now almost a year old.

No. overall	No. in series	Title	Original release date
13	1	"Letter from America"	18 December 2006
Clare has a pen friendship with a death row prisoner in the US. He learns all about her relationship and work life. Guest appearance by Roy Hudd.
14	2	"Merry Christmas Mrs Lawrence"	25 December 2006
On Christmas Day, Clare pensively visits her grandfather's grave, then goes to fetch her grandmother from an old people's home en route to Christmas dinner with her parents. Guest appearances by Phil Davis and Brigit Forsyth.
15	3	"Brenda's Birthday"	1 January 2007
Megan's old friend Gordon comes to help celebrate Brenda's first birthday. Clare organises the entertainment and is outraged at seeing a Punch and Judy show appear. With Lewis Macleod.
16	4	"We Need to Talk About Brian"	8 January 2007
Brian's diary from his student days turns up during a round of 'de-cluttering.' Although he had already met Clare, there are numerous references to his "Dark Lady".
17	5	"The Redcap"	15 January 2007
Will a former military police officer be tough enough for social work? Clare and her colleagues have bought a ridiculous leaving present for their colleague Peggy.
18	6	"Clare's Last Stand"	22 January 2007
Clare and the day-centre team are due for a relaxing day at a conference--until Clare's arch-enemy Peggy reappears with a challenge that Clare cannot pass up.

=== Series four ===
Irene has been promoted to team leader which causes resentment between her and Clare. Brian and Clare make frequent trips to couples counselling and have also been trying for a baby.

No. overall	No. in series	Title	Original release date
19	1	"Mother of All Mothers"	16 January 2008
Clare and Brian are trying for a baby, but Clare's mother arrives instead of happier news.
20	2	"A Game of Two Slavs"	23 January 2008
A relationship counsellor suggests that Clare and Brian take each other out to some events to share their interests. Brian takes Clare to a football game and she takes him into work.
21	3	"And The Winner Is"	30 January 2008
Clare dreams that she wins the 'Social Worker of the Year' award. Irene breaks up with her husband Stanley, leaving Brian to console him.
22	4	"Carry On up the Amazon"	6 February 2008
Helen's son is supposed to be travelling during his gap year but is found living in a squat. Meanwhile, Brian interviews for a lodger.
23	5	"My Funny Valentine"	13 February 2008
Brian is amazed that Clare has not only remembered Valentine's Day, but even booked a restaurant, though in fact she has not.
24	6	"The Long Goodbye"	20 February 2008
Brian has a life-changing experience when a bullet grazes his head and contemplates giving up teaching. This is the last appearance of Gemma Craven as Helen.

=== Series five ===
Clare and Brian now have a son, Thomas, and a full-time nanny for him, the east-European Nali (also played by Nina Conti). Helen is now played by Liza Tarbuck.

No. overall	No. in series	Title	Original release date
25	1	"Name Calling"	18 February 2009
Clare and her colleagues give a leaving present to their longest-serving workmate. The Sparrowhawk group decide to protest about the funding cuts from the local council with slogans and T-shirts.
26	2	"Too Cool For School"	25 February 2009
Clare meets a group of new friends in the pub and bores Brian and her co-workers with how cool they are; Clare and Megan visit a young girl who has been off school.
27	3	"Girls on Film"	4 March 2009
Clare has a new student social-worker from a privileged background to take under her wing; the Sparrowhawk Family Centre is visited by documentary makers.
28	4	"It's Good to Talk"	11 March 2009
An old university friend of Clare's gets in touch to say something important. Brian works out the mathematics behind his relationship with Clare.
29	5	"Garden Party"	18 March 2009
Clare arranges a petition to save the Sparrowhawk Family Centre, and throws a garden party to get to know her new neighbours. Brian tries to share his feelings with Simon.
30	6	"The 1864 Mining Disaster"	25 March 2009
A firebrand MP comes to the Sparrowhawk Family Centre's fundraiser and Ray brings his guitar hoping to entertain.

=== Series six ===
Clare's position at the Family Centre is now challenged by Irene's replacement, Libby (Sarah Kendall), and Brian harbours erotic fantasies about Nali. In this series Simon is played by Philip Pope.

No. overall	No. in series	Title	Original release date
31	1	"Liar, Liar, Pants on Fire"	31 May 2010
Clare deceives Libby about the closing date for the team-manager post; Brian obsesses about Nali.
32	2	"Luck of the Irish"	7 June 2010
Clare is convinced she has no heritage of interest. However, when told that she has Irish ancestry she becomes enthusiastic for all aspects of her new-found cultural background.
33	3	"Some Others Do 'Ave 'Em"	14 June 2010
Clare is back on the social-work frontline as a vomiting bug hits her colleagues, while Brian and Nali take baby Thomas out for the day. Helen attends a police liaison meeting and asks the police commissioner some challenging questions. Guest appearances by Doreen Mantle and Rosemary Leach.
34	4	"Clare v God"	21 June 2010
Clare takes an instant dislike to the meddling Reverend Dish, though Megan quite likes him. Meanwhile, Helen has discovered speed dating.
35	5	"In The Dog House"	28 June 2010
A stray dog who comes home with Clare catches a burglar (guest appearance by Paterson Joseph), but the burglar is a match for even Clare in manipulativeness (Libby is played by Jess Robinson).
36	6	"The Crush"	5 July 2010
Clare meets an attractive single father (Paterson Joseph) at an infants' music group. Meanwhile Nali gives a talk to an unruly class at Brian's school.

=== Series seven ===
Brian is eventually forgiven for his infidelity with Nali's sister and Clare accepts his proposal of marriage, while Nali enters Conservative politics. Andrew Wincott returns as Simon.

No. overall	No. in series	Title	Original release date
37	1	"The Prisoner"	23 September 2011
The shock of Brian's infidelity still has not worn off, and Nali could be an even more serious inside threat than Clare realised. Clare is arrested and put into a prison cell and finds support from a Woman Police Officer.
38	2	"To Kill a Mocking Bird"	30 September 2011
Clare ends her relationship with Brian and is surprised by her colleagues' reaction to the news, especially Megan who sees this as a chance to ask Brian out. Meanwhile Brian and Simon find humane ways to put an injured bird out of its misery.
39	3	"Rude Girl"	7 October 2011
Clare feels that she may be out of touch with today's young people's language so asks the young heating engineer Daniel for some trendy phrases to use. Meanwhile Brian's attempts at romantic gestures with Clare fail to impress.
40	4	"Debt of Honour"	14 October 2011
Clare is being plagued by Brian's marriage proposals and her driving lessons lead to an unexpected encounter with someone with a criminal past who seems to show his appreciation for giving him a lift. However, he overhears how Clare could "murder" Brian. There is also an unveiling of a piece of public art at the Sparrowhawk Family Centre.
41	5	"Heroes"	21 October 2011
Clare has a new student worker Bradley Bigg, the working class singer-songwriter who made an impression on her as a teenager, Brian breaks some bad news to Nali, and Helen enthusiastically adopts the role of health and safety officer.
42	6	"Basic Attraction"	28 October 2011
Clare and Brian are finally about to get married, though one particular woman is determined that the wedding should not take place. Brian decides to do something about his single status for one last night.

=== Series eight ===
No. overall	No. in series	Title	Original release date
43	1	"Hot Desk"	2 January 2013
Clare and her colleagues have to move offices. Brian's authority at school is undermined by a trendy teenage poet.
44	2	"On Expenses"	9 January 2013
With society collapsing all around her, Clare is appalled to be stuck indoors bean-counting. Then the Sparrowhawk Family centre's expenses do not add up. Meanwhile Brian attempts to get the decorating done.
45	3	"Fifty Shades of Ray"	16 January 2013
Clare and her colleagues are worried that Ray has a serious illness so Clare agrees to go on a battle reenactment trip with him.
46	4	"Nanny State"	23 January 2013
Clare meets her ex-nanny Nali in a cafe hoping that she will come back to work for her.
47	5	"The Scapegoat"	30 January 2013
Clare plays along with the team's method of privately insulting clients, unaware that a client can hear her. Brian is looking forward to being head of the department.
48	6	"The Parent Trap"	6 February 2013
Clare finally becomes team leader (in Libby's absence) and is keen to see the fruits of Megan's football sessions. Ray believes he is a father and that the now-adult wants to meet him. Brian's mother (Hannah Gordon) visits and outstays her welcome. The first appearance by social worker Joan Hastings.

=== Edinburgh special ===
No. overall	No. in series	Title	Original release date
49	1	"In Treatment"	27 August 2013
Clare and Brian decide to try relationship counselling. The male counsellor seems very fond of Clare and dismissive of Brian. Recorded in the BBC tent at the Edinburgh Festival Fringe 2013.

=== Series nine ===
Joan Hastings becomes a regular character (introduced in series 8, episode 6) as Megan's maternity cover.

No. overall	No. in series	Title	Original release date
50	1	"Stand By Your Man"	8 January 2014
Clare returns to work after fleeing her honeymoon. Brian still tries to fit in with other couples.
51	2	"In Blog We Trust"	15 January 2014
Clare becomes convinced that Sparrowhawk Centre is the home of a blogger called `The Secret Social Worker'. Brian goes on a date in an attempt to move on.
52	3	"Away Day Wey Hey"	22 January 2014
Clare and the rest of the Sparrowhawk team are forced to take part in a team-building away day, much to Clare's disapproval. However, she reveals something about her childhood.
53	4	"Driven to Extremes"	29 January 2014
Clare is facing a disciplinary tribunal after a seemingly straightforward job goes awry and finds a helping hand from Joan.
54	5	"Panic Room"	5 February 2014
Clare is forced to confront an old phobia after a regular home visit takes an unusual turn. Fortunately, Helen is on hand to help. In the pub Brian meets someone to do the quiz with. Megan and Joan realise they both enjoy reciting platitudes.
55	6	"Come Dine With Me"	12 February 2014
Clare finally finds time for romance, while Brian finds a cheap flat comes with unusual conditions and Nali has a memorable first day at her new job.

=== Christmas With... ===
No. overall	No. in series	Title	Original release date
56	1	"Christmas With Clare Barker"	29 December 2014
Part 4 of 6 "Christmas With..." seasonal comedy programmes. Other episodes involve Damien Trench (In and Out of the Kitchen) and Ed Reardon (Ed Reardon's Week). Clare goes into work over the Christmas period leaving Brian and Nali to play various games together one of which involves a mistletoe.

=== Series ten ===
In this series, Helen is played by Pippa Haywood.

No. overall	No. in series	Title	Original release date
57	1	"My Kinda Town"	10 July 2015
Clare gets involved with a devious TV producer who is making a documentary about the Sparrowhawk estate.
58	2	"Family Values"	17 July 2015
A family funeral reveals some uncomfortable truths for the Barker family.
59	3	"Sisters"	24 July 2015
Clare is forced to cooperate with her estranged sister.
60	4	"Things That Go Bump In the Day"	31 July 2015
The Sparrowhawk team are forced to work together to overcome a little problem they discover in the office.
61	5	"This Is A Man's World"	7 August 2015
Nali's ex-husband arrives unexpectedly and Clare takes it upon herself to intervene.
62	6	"Party On"	14 August 2015
The Sparrowhawk team hold a leaving do, and take the opportunity to reminisce.

=== Series eleven ===
No. overall	No. in series	Title	Original release date
63	1	"Fight Them On The Beaches"	15 November 2016
Clare organises a day out at the seaside for some elderly residents of the estate.
64	2	"Hell On Wheels"	22 November 2016
Clare helps raise awareness about disability, while Nali has plans to become an internet sensation.
65	3	"Unfaithful"	29 November 2016
Clare and Brian are having some couples counselling, which rapidly goes off-course.
66	4	"Momento"	6 December 2016
Riots have broken out on the Sparrowhawk estate and ruined the team's family fun day. In all the chaos, Clare has lost her memory and is roaming the streets.
67	5	"Joan Alone"	13 December 2016
Joan's birthday offers Clare an example of why it is important to be aware of loneliness and isolation in the community.
68	6	"You Take The High Road"	20 December 2016
Clare and Libby find themselves stranded a long way from an important speaking engagement.

=== Series twelve ===
No. overall	No. in series	Title	Original release date
69	1	"Heartbroken"	24 September 2019
Clare is not feeling particularly sympathetic towards Brian after he is dramatically unwell. She is more concerned about delivering her showstopping palliative care package.
70	2	"I Predict A Riot"	1 October 2019
Clare has found herself in the middle of a riot at the women's prison. Back in the Sparrowhawk office, Joan is convinced there is something strange going on.
71	3	"Questions, Questions"	8 October 2019
Clare's got tickets to Any Questions? Elsewhere, Brian's gone back to Men's Group and discovered there's been some developments.
72	4	"Unlucky Louis"	15 October 2019
Clare's on a visit to unlucky Louis. Back at home, Brian and Thomas find themselves excluded from the neighbourhood street party.
73	5	"Ray of Sunshine"	22 October 2019
The Sparrowhawk office have a visit from an old team member. Ray's gone up in the world and he's got a proposition for them. At home, Brian is becoming suspicious about Clare's behaviour but he knows whom to call.
74	6	"Killing Clare"	29 October 2019
It is time for Nali to leave, but she has to pop to the shops. Two mysterious visitors appear and reveal her secret to Clare.
