= Harold Stanley =

American businessman (1885–1963)

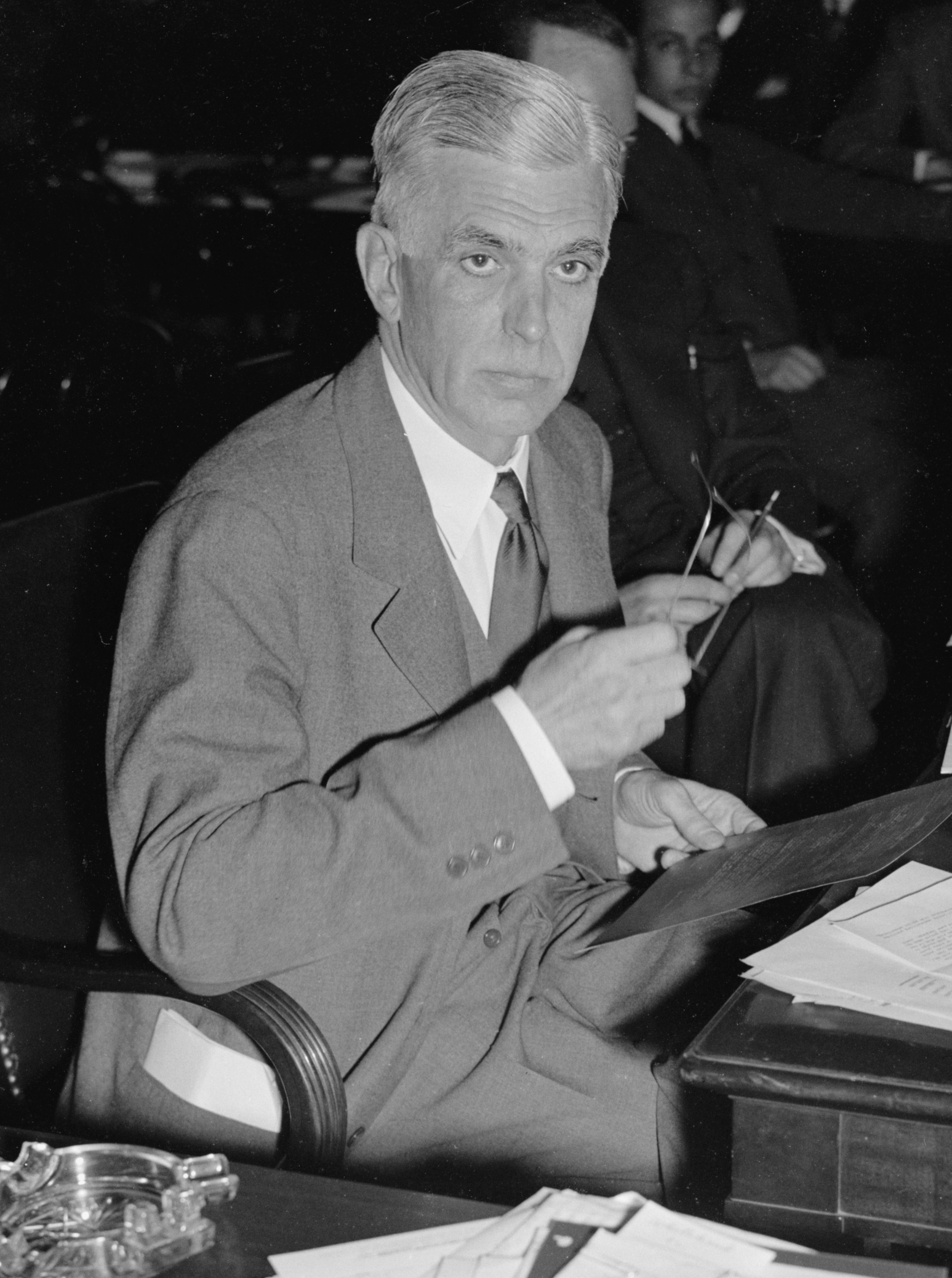
- Stanley in 1939
- Born: October 2, 1885; Great Barrington, Massachusetts, U.S.
- Died: May 14, 1963 (aged 77); Philadelphia, Pennsylvania, U.S.
- Education: Yale University
- Occupation: Businessman
- Known for: Morgan Stanley

Harold Stanley (October 2, 1885 – May 14, 1963) was an American businessman and one of the founders of Morgan Stanley in 1935. For 20 years, he ran Morgan Stanley until he left the firm in 1955.

== Early life ==
Stanley was born in Great Barrington, Massachusetts, the son of William Stanley, Jr. and Lila Courtney Stanley. William was an inventor with General Electric for whom the Stanley Works building was named in Pittsfield, Massachusetts. He graduated from the Hotchkiss School in 1904 and Yale University in 1908. Harold Stanley was a member of the Skull and Bones secret society.

== Career ==
He became a vice-president of the bond department of the Guaranty Trust Company of New York in 1916, eventually spinning the division off into a separate and subsidiary securities company, the Guaranty Company, where he worked in cooperation with J. P. Morgan, Jr. In 1927, Morgan invited Stanley to become a partner in his firm, replacing Dwight Morrow, who became the United States ambassador to Mexico. He made his name as a leader of the investment banking industry at J.P. Morgan, making the firm a strong player in securities offerings and especially the bond market, particularly after the Glass–Steagall Act separated commercial and investment banking.

In 1935, after over a year of being barred from the securities business, Stanley helped found Morgan Stanley along with Henry Sturgis Morgan, J. P. Morgan's grandson and J. P. Morgan Jr.'s son. It was founded with $6.6 million of nonvoting stocks from J.P. Morgan's partners. The move was aimed to take up the securities business that had to be given up by J. P. Morgan, and became the firm's senior partner when it was reorganized from a corporation to a partnership in 1941. In 1982, the company first registered with CFTC as a futures commodity merchant. Stanley was influential in his testimony in the 1940s successfully defending the industry against government charges that it was anti-competitive.

== Personal life ==
He married Edith Thurston, daughter of William Harris Thurston, in 1914. She died in 1934, and he married Louise Todd, widow of Seymour Parker Gilbert, in 1939. He had stepchildren, but no children from either of his marriages. He resided at 4 East 72nd Street on Manhattan's Upper East Side in New York City and died in Philadelphia in 1963.

=== Activities and interests ===
He was a member of the Links Club of New York, the National Golf Club, the Racquet and Tennis Club, and the Yale Club. He was a director of many companies including the Shell Caribbean Petroleum Corporation.

Stanley played ice hockey at Yale University between 1906 and 1908 and later on the St. Nicholas Hockey Club in the American Amateur Hockey League.

=== Philanthropy ===
In 1940, he led the New York campaign to raise $1.5 million (equivalent to $34,471,000 in 2025) for the United States Commission for the Care of European Children, a private organization providing relief to young war refugees.
