= Feeling Nuts Movement =

Testicular cancer awareness campaign

The Feeling Nuts movement is a social media campaign created by Check One Two in London, to encourage young men to regularly check their testicles for early signs of testicular cancer. The campaign went viral when the public and celebrities began sharing pictures and videos of crotch grabs using the hashtag #feelingnuts and became a TV event on Channel 4. The campaign involves both social media and television.

== Origins ==
Feeling Nuts was created by brothers and founders of Salter Brothers Entertainment, Simon and Andrew Salter after being inspired by Wendy Gough, a mother who lost her son to testicular cancer in 1998 simply because he was too embarrassed to discuss it. Gough has conducted awareness talks in schools ever since her son's death which left a lasting impression on the Salter brothers. They realised that raising money wasn't necessary to stop men dying of testicular cancer and therefore created a new currency through social awareness. In an interview with The Times, the brothers stated that "young guys don’t want to listen to charities lecturing them so we took a different approach" creating the social movement organisation Check One Two and devising its first campaign 'Feeling Nuts'.

In an interview with The Huffington Post Andrew explained: "Our mission is to empower people to spread awareness of this preventable cancer and change behavior to check themselves regularly. We firmly believe that this social movement, designed to save lives, will get the nation talking about this taboo subject and by using entertainment around the #feelingnuts campaign, ultimately, save lives."

On 10 April 2014, Check One Two launched the hashtag #FeelingNuts to promote the Testicular Cancer Awareness Month and encouraged men to regularly check themselves for testicular cancer.

On 12 June 2014, the Check One Two YouTube channel uploaded a video titled "Are You #FeelingNuts", challenging viewers to share pictures of themselves grabbing their crotch with the hashtag #FeelingNuts to raise awareness about testicular cancer.

The tipping point for Feeling Nuts arrived in August 2014 when the brothers dropped their trousers in Oxford Street in London and took a selfie grabbing their crotches, receiving 4,864 retweets and 13,507 favourites on Twitter. Using #feelingnuts, they started a monthly call to action for men to check themselves regularly and then issued an online challenge to boyband 5 Seconds of Summer and Richard Branson's son Sam Branson, who took it up. Soon more celebrities started to challenge each other including Hugh Jackman, William Shatner, Ricky Gervais, chef Jamie Oliver and fashion model Cara Delevingne.

In October 2014 the campaign went viral and social media monitoring company Brandwatch estimated that within 3 months, the campaign had reached at least 750 million people globally in addition to thousands of media stories.

== The Feeling Nuts Comedy Night ==
On 17 September 2014 it was announced that the brothers had joined forces with Channel 4 to launch a 90-minute comedy TV event called The Feeling Nuts Comedy Night designed to raise awareness of testicular cancer. The show premiered on 24 October 2014 and was hosted by comedian Jack Whitehall as well as featuring comedy sketches from Cara Delevingne, Jimmy Carr, One Direction and musical performances from James Corden and Rizzle Kicks. The show also reunited Martin Clunes and Neil Morrissey for a new Men Behaving Badly sketch for the first time in over 15 years. The Feeling Nuts Comedy Night event was a success, easily beating and over doubling the channel's slot average.
