= List of Relativity Media films =

This is a list of films financed, produced, or distributed by Relativity Media, an American media company.

== 2000s ==
Release date	Title	Notes
April 28, 2006	RV	with Columbia Pictures, Red Wagon Entertainment and Intermedia Films; first Relativity film
June 16, 2006	The Fast and the Furious: Tokyo Drift	with Universal Pictures and Neal H. Moritz Productions
July 21, 2006	Monster House	with Columbia Pictures, ImageMovers and Amblin Entertainment
August 4, 2006	Talladega Nights: The Ballad of Ricky Bobby	with Columbia Pictures, Apatow Productions and Mosaic Media Group
September 15, 2006	Gridiron Gang	with Columbia Pictures and Original Film
September 22, 2006	All the King's Men	with Columbia Pictures and Phoenix Pictures
December 8, 2006	The Holiday	with Columbia Pictures, Universal Pictures and Waverly Films
December 15, 2006	The Pursuit of Happyness	with Columbia Pictures, Escape Artists and Overbrook Entertainment
January 26, 2007	Catch and Release	with Columbia Pictures
February 16, 2007	Ghost Rider	with Columbia Pictures, Marvel Entertainment and Crystal Sky Pictures
March 2, 2007	Full of It	with New Line Cinema
March 23, 2007	Reign Over Me	with Columbia Pictures, Madison 23 and Sunlight Productions
June 1, 2007	Mr. Brooks	with Tig Productions and Metro-Goldwyn-Mayer
June 22, 2007	Evan Almighty	with Universal Pictures, Spyglass Entertainment, Original Film and Shady Acres Entertainment
July 20, 2007	I Now Pronounce You Chuck & Larry	with Universal Pictures, Shady Acres Entertainment and Happy Madison Productions
September 7, 2007	3:10 to Yuma	with Lionsgate and Tree Line Film
September 28, 2007	The Kingdom	with Universal Pictures and Film 44
November 2, 2007	American Gangster	with Universal Pictures, Imagine Entertainment and Scott Free Productions
December 7, 2007	Atonement	with Focus Features, Working Title Films and StudioCanal
December 21, 2007	Charlie Wilson's War	with Universal Pictures and Participant Media
December 21, 2007	Walk Hard: The Dewey Cox Story	with Columbia Pictures and Apatow Productions
February 22, 2008	Vantage Point	with Columbia Pictures and Original Film
February 29, 2008	The Other Boleyn Girl	with Columbia Pictures, Focus Features and BBC Films
March 28, 2008	21	with Columbia Pictures and Trigger Street Productions
April 25, 2008	Baby Mama	with Universal Pictures
May 2, 2008	Made of Honor	with Columbia Pictures and Original Film
June 6, 2008	You Don't Mess with the Zohan	with Columbia Pictures and Happy Madison Productions
June 27, 2008	Wanted	with Universal Pictures and Spyglass Entertainment
July 2, 2008	Hancock	with Columbia Pictures, Weed Road Pictures and Overbrook Entertainment
July 11, 2008	Hellboy II: The Golden Army	with Universal Pictures and Dark Horse Entertainment
July 18, 2008	Mamma Mia!	with Universal Pictures and Playtone
July 25, 2008	Step Brothers	with Columbia Pictures, Apatow Productions and Gary Sanchez Productions
August 1, 2008	The Mummy: Tomb of the Dragon Emperor	with Universal Pictures and The Sommers Company
August 6, 2008	Pineapple Express	with Columbia Pictures and Apatow Productions
August 22, 2008	Death Race	with Universal Pictures, Cruise/Wagner Productions and Impact Pictures
August 22, 2008	The House Bunny	with Columbia Pictures and Happy Madison Productions
September 12, 2008	Burn After Reading	with Focus Features, StudioCanal, Working Title Films and Mike Zoss Productions
October 10, 2008	The Express: The Ernie Davis Story	with Universal Pictures and Davis Entertainment
October 31, 2008	Changeling	with Universal Pictures, Imagine Entertainment and Malpaso Productions
November 7, 2008	Role Models	with Universal Pictures
December 5, 2008	Frost/Nixon	with Universal Pictures, Working Title Films, Imagine Entertainment and StudioCanal
December 19, 2008	Seven Pounds	with Columbia Pictures, Escape Artists and Overbrook Entertainment
December 19, 2008	The Tale of Despereaux	with Universal Pictures and Framestore
January 9, 2009	The Unborn	with Rogue Pictures and Platinum Dunes
January 16, 2009	Paul Blart: Mall Cop	with Columbia Pictures and Happy Madison Productions
February 13, 2009	The International	with Columbia Pictures and Atlas Entertainment
March 20, 2009	Duplicity	with Universal Pictures
April 3, 2009	Fast & Furious	with Universal Pictures and Original Film
April 17, 2009	State of Play	with Universal Pictures and Working Title Films
April 24, 2009	Fighting	with Rogue Pictures
June 5, 2009	Land of the Lost	with Universal Pictures and Mosaic Media Group
June 12, 2009	The Taking of Pelham 123	with Columbia Pictures, Metro-Goldwyn-Mayer, Scott Free Productions and Escape Artists
July 1, 2009	Public Enemies	with Universal Pictures and Forward Pass Productions
July 24, 2009	The Ugly Truth	with Columbia Pictures and Lakeshore Entertainment
July 31, 2009	Funny People	with Universal Pictures, Columbia Pictures, Happy Madison Productions and Apatow Productions
August 7, 2009	A Perfect Getaway	with Rogue Pictures and QED International
September 9, 2009	9	with Focus Features
September 18, 2009	Love Happens	with Universal Pictures
October 2, 2009	A Serious Man	with Focus Features, StudioCanal, Working Title Films and Mike Zoss Productions
October 2, 2009	Zombieland	with Columbia Pictures and Pariah Productions
October 9, 2009	Couples Retreat	with Universal Pictures and Wild West Picture Show
October 23, 2009	Cirque du Freak: The Vampire's Assistant	with Universal Pictures
November 17, 2009	Wild Child	with Universal Pictures, Working Title Films and StudioCanal
December 4, 2009	Brothers	with Lionsgate
December 18, 2009	Did You Hear About the Morgans?	with Columbia Pictures and Castle Rock Entertainment
December 18, 2009	Nine	with The Weinstein Company
December 25, 2009	It's Complicated	with Universal Pictures and Waverly Films

== 2010s ==
Release date	Title	Notes
January 15, 2010	The Spy Next Door	with Lionsgate
February 5, 2010	Dear John	with Screen Gems and Temple Hill Entertainment
February 12, 2010	The Wolfman	with Universal Pictures
March 12, 2010	Green Zone	with Universal Pictures, StudioCanal and Working Title Films
March 19, 2010	The Bounty Hunter	with Columbia Pictures and Original Film
March 19, 2010	Repo Men	with Universal Pictures
May 14, 2010	Robin Hood	with Universal Pictures, Imagine Entertainment and Scott Free Productions
May 21, 2010	MacGruber	distribution; with Rogue Pictures
June 4, 2010	Get Him to the Greek	with Universal Pictures, Spyglass Entertainment and Apatow Productions
June 25, 2010	Grown Ups	with Columbia Pictures and Happy Madison Productions
July 23, 2010	Salt	with Columbia Pictures and Di Bonaventura Pictures
July 30, 2010	Charlie St. Cloud	with Universal Pictures
August 13, 2010	Scott Pilgrim vs. the World	with Universal Pictures, Marc Platt Productions, Big Talk Films, Closed on Mondays Productions and Dentsu
August 20, 2010	Nanny McPhee and the Big Bang	with Universal Pictures, Working Title Films and StudioCanal
September 17, 2010	Catfish	distribution; with Rogue Pictures
October 1, 2010	The Social Network	with Columbia Pictures and Trigger Street Productions; Inducted into the National Film Registry in 2024
October 8, 2010	My Soul to Take	distribution; with Rogue Pictures and Corvus Corax
November 12, 2010	Skyline	with Rogue Pictures and Hydraulx
December 3, 2010	The Warrior's Way	distribution; with Rogue Pictures
December 17, 2010	The Fighter	with Paramount Pictures, The Weinstein Company and Mandeville Films
December 22, 2010	Little Fockers	with Universal Pictures, DreamWorks Pictures and Paramount Pictures
January 7, 2011	Season of the Witch	distribution; with Rogue Pictures and Atlas Entertainment
February 4, 2011	Sanctum	with Universal Pictures and Wayfare Entertainment
March 4, 2011	Take Me Home Tonight	distribution; with Rogue Pictures and Imagine Entertainment
March 11, 2011	Battle: Los Angeles	with Columbia Pictures and Original Film
March 18, 2011	Limitless	distribution; with Rogue Pictures and Virgin Produced
March 18, 2011	Paul	with Universal Pictures, Working Title Films and Big Talk Studios
April 1, 2011	Hop	with Universal Pictures and Illumination
May 13, 2011	Bridesmaids	with Universal Pictures and Apatow Productions
May 20, 2011	Cost of a Soul	distribution; with Rogue Pictures, Cast Shadow Production and AMC Independent
June 10, 2011	Judy Moody and the Not Bummer Summer	distribution; with Smokewood Entertainment
July 29, 2011	Cowboys & Aliens	with Universal Pictures, DreamWorks Pictures, Reliance Entertainment, Imagine Entertainment, K/O Paper Products, Fairview Entertainment and Platinum Studios
August 5, 2011	The Change-Up	with Universal Pictures and Original Film
September 2, 2011	Shark Night	distribution; with Rogue Pictures and Sierra Pictures
September 23, 2011	Machine Gun Preacher	distribution; with Virgin Produced
October 28, 2011	Anonymous	with Columbia Pictures and Centropolis Entertainment
October 28, 2011	Johnny English Reborn	with Universal Pictures, StudioCanal and Working Title Films
November 4, 2011	Tower Heist	with Universal Pictures and Imagine Entertainment
November 11, 2011	Immortals	distribution; with Virgin Produced
January 13, 2012	Contraband	co-produced with Universal Pictures and Working Title Films
January 20, 2012	Haywire	distribution
February 10, 2012	Safe House	co-produced with Universal Pictures and Bluegrass Films
February 24, 2012	Act of Valor	distribution
February 24, 2012	Wanderlust	co-produced with Universal Pictures and Apatow Productions
March 16, 2012	21 Jump Street	co-produced with Columbia Pictures, Metro-Goldwyn-Mayer and Original Film
March 30, 2012	Mirror Mirror	distribution
April 6, 2012	American Reunion	co-produced with Universal Pictures
April 27, 2012	The Five-Year Engagement	co-produced with Universal Pictures and Apatow Productions
April 27, 2012	The Raven	distribution; with FilmNation Entertainment and Intrepid Pictures
June 15, 2012	That's My Boy	co-produced with Columbia Pictures and Happy Madison Productions
July 6, 2012	Savages	co-produced with Universal Pictures
August 3, 2012	Total Recall	with Columbia Pictures and Original Film
August 10, 2012	The Bourne Legacy	co-produced with Universal Pictures and The Kennedy/Marshall Company
September 21, 2012	House at the End of the Street	distribution; with FilmNation Entertainment
December 25, 2012	Les Misérables	co-produced with Universal Pictures, Working Title Films and Cameron Mackintosh, Ltd.
January 25, 2013	Movie 43	distribution; with Rogue Pictures and Virgin Produced
February 8, 2013	Identity Thief	co-production with Universal Pictures and Bluegrass Films
February 14, 2013	Safe Haven	distribution; with Temple Hill Entertainment
March 1, 2013	21 & Over	distribution; with Mandeville Films and Virgin Produced
April 19, 2013	Oblivion	co-production with Universal Pictures
May 24, 2013	Fast & Furious 6	co-production with Universal Pictures and Original Film
July 19, 2013	The World's End	co-production with Focus Features, Working Title Films and Big Talk Films
August 16, 2013	Paranoia	U.S. distribution; with IM Global
September 13, 2013	The Family	distribution; with EuropaCorp
September 27, 2013	Don Jon	U.S. distribution; with Voltage Pictures and Hit Record Films
October 11, 2013	Romeo and Juliet	distribution; with Amber Entertainment, Echo Lake Entertainment and Swarovski Entertainment
November 1, 2013	Free Birds	distribution; with Reel FX Animation Studios
December 6, 2013	Out of the Furnace	distribution; with Appian Way Productions
December 25, 2013	47 Ronin	distribution; with Universal Pictures
January 17, 2014	Ride Along	co-production with Universal Pictures
February 21, 2014	3 Days to Kill	distribution; with EuropaCorp
April 11, 2014	Oculus	U.S. distribution; with Intrepid Pictures, WWE Studios and Blumhouse Productions
April 25, 2014	Brick Mansions	U.S. distribution; with EuropaCorp
July 2, 2014	Earth to Echo	distribution; with Panay Films
August 27, 2014	The November Man	distribution
September 19, 2014	Hector and the Search for Happiness	distribution
October 17, 2014	The Best of Me	distribution
November 14, 2014	Beyond the Lights	distribution
January 2, 2015	The Woman in Black: Angel of Death	U.S. distribution; with Hammer Film Productions; Entertainment One and Cross Creek Pictures
January 30, 2015	Black or White	U.S. distribution; with Treehouse Films
February 27, 2015	The Lazarus Effect	U.S. distribution; with Blumhouse Productions
April 10, 2015	Desert Dancer	distribution; with Six Sales
June 26, 2015	Big Game	co-distributed with EuropaCorp (final Relativity film under the Relativity Media name)
January 29, 2016	Jane Got a Gun	co-produced with The Weinstein Company
March 25, 2016	Before I Wake	original distribution; co-produced with Intrepid Pictures, Demarest Films and MICA Entertainment
September 9, 2016	The Disappointments Room	distribution with Rogue Pictures; co-produced with Demarest Films and Media Talent Group
September 23, 2016	Fallen	original distribution; co-produced with Mayhem Pictures
September 30, 2016	Masterminds	distribution; co-produced with Michaels-Goldwyn (first Relativity Studios film)
June 2, 2017	Dobaara: See Your Evil	co-production with Intrepid Pictures, B4U Films, and Zahhak Films Limited
August 4, 2017	Kidnap	original distribution; co-produced with Ingenious Media, Di Bonaventura Pictures and 606 Films
October 26, 2018	Hunter Killer	co-production with Summit Premiere, Millennium Media, Original Film, G-BASE and Tucker Tooley Entertainment

== 2020s ==
Release date	Title	Notes
November 13, 2020	Come Away	US distribution only; produced by Endurance Media, Fred Films and Yoruba Saxon Productions
January 12, 2021	Dr. Bird's Advice for Sad Poets	co-distribution with Ketchup Entertainment; produced by Ketchup Entertainment, Storyboard Media and Kreate Films
April 30, 2021	Triumph	US distribution only; produced by Digital Ignition Entertainment and Argonaut Entertainment Partners
October 29, 2021	Violet	co-distribution with Rogue Pictures
March 22, 2022	Assailant	co-distribution with Redbox Entertainment; produced by MSR Media, Highfield Grange Studios and Sherborne Media Capital
November 2, 2022	The Independent	US distribution only; produced by Anonymous Content, Park Pictures and The Exchange
May 12, 2023	Hypnotic	co-distribution with Ketchup Entertainment; produced by Solstice Studios, Ingenious Media, Studio 8 and Double R Productions
October 27, 2023	Freelance	US distribution only; produced by Endurance Media, Sentient Entertainment, AGC Studios, Signature Films and Lipsync
December 22, 2023	Memory	co-distribution with Ketchup Entertainment; produced by Mubi, Teorema, High Frequency Entertainment, Screen Capital and Case Study Films
December 13, 2024	The Man in the White Van	North American distribution only; produced by Legion M and Garrison Film
August 15, 2025	The Knife	co-distribution with Inaugural Entertainment; produced by Duplass Brothers Productions and iAM21 Entertainment
