= Alexandra Magistro =

American film producer and writer

- Years active: 2015–present
- Notable work: The Fall of the House of Usher; The Life of Chuck

Alexandra Magistro is an American film producer and writer.

== Career ==
Magistro is vice president of creative at Mike Flanagan's Red Room Pictures; her credits include the Netflix horror miniseries The Haunting of Bly Manor (2020) and The Fall of the House of Usher (2023), and the fantasy drama film The Life of Chuck (2024). Magistro is also a writer and associate producer on the Amazon Prime Video supernatural horror miniseries Carrie (2026) and an executive producer on the upcoming supernatural horror film The Exorcist: Martyrs (2027).

Magistro is set to make her feature directorial debut with the psychological body horror film Rot, which is being produced by Flanagan.

== Filmography ==
=== Film ===
Key
†	Denotes films that have not yet been released

Year	Title	Role	Notes	Ref.
2019	Doctor Sleep	Assistant to Mike Flanagan		
2020	Rinse Cycle	Producer	Short film	
2020	Nothing and No One	Producer	Short film	
2024	The Life of Chuck	Associate producer		
2027	The Exorcist: Martyrs †	Executive producer		

=== Television ===
Year	Title	Role	Notes	Ref.
2015	Oprah's Master Class: Belief Special	Office production assistant		
2015	Oprah's Master Class	Office production assistant	7 episodes	
2015	Oprah Goes to Broadway: The Color Purple	Office production assistant		
2016	America Divided	Production coordinator	5 episodes	
2017	Frontline	Production coordinator	2 episodes	
2020	The Haunting of Bly Manor	Assistant to Mike Flanagan		
2021	Midnight Mass	Assistant to Mike Flanagan		
2022	The Midnight Club	Assistant to Mike Flanagan		
2023	The Fall of the House of Usher	Associate producer		
2026	Carrie	Writer and associate producer		
