= Absentia (film) =

2011 film by Mike Flanagan

- Official film poster
- Directed by: Mike Flanagan
- Written by: Mike Flanagan
- Produced by: Justin Gordon; Morgan Peter Brown; Mike Flanagan
- Starring: Katie Parker; Courtney Bell; Dave Levine; Justin Gordon; Morgan Peter Brown; James Flanagan; Scott Graham; Doug Jones
- Cinematography: Rustin Cerveny
- Edited by: Mike Flanagan
- Music by: Ryan David Leack
- Production company: Fallback Plan Productions
- Distributed by: Phase 4 Films
- Release date: March 3, 2011 (Fargo)
- Running time: 91 minutes
- Country: United States
- Language: English
- Budget: $70,000

Absentia is a 2011 American independent supernatural horror film written, edited and directed by Mike Flanagan in his directorial feature film debut, and produced by FallBack Plan Productions. The film's principal photography phase was funded by way of the film's project page on crowdfunding website Kickstarter. Courtney Bell stars as a pregnant woman whose missing husband briefly reappears after an unexplained seven-year absence.

== Plot ==
After seven years, Tricia, a pregnant woman who lives alone in a neighborhood of Glendale, California, is finally ready to accept that her missing husband, Daniel, will not return. As she prepares to declare him dead in absentia, her younger sister Callie, a former addict, comes to stay with her. She gives Tricia a children's book, The Three Billy Goats Gruff, a traditional fairy tale whose story provides a subtext to the film in its foreshadowing of a bridge controlled by an evil entity. Together, they work to obtain Daniel's death certificate and find a new apartment for Tricia. As the date approaches, Tricia has terrifying nightmares and hallucinations about Daniel that her psychiatrist interprets as stress and guilt. While jogging, Callie runs into a gaunt man in a tunnel who seems shocked that she can see him. He introduces himself as Walter Lambert and begs her to contact his son, but she runs off. Later, she returns with food and leaves it in the tunnel, which she finds empty.

When Callie discovers a pile of small metal objects on their doorstop, she assumes they were left there by Walter, so she places them at the tunnel entrance. A man walking by advises her not to do so and deposits a trash bag in the same spot. She later finds the pile of metal objects on her bed. Detective Mallory, who has been investigating Daniel's disappearance and is romantically involved with Tricia, responds to the call and chastises the women for leaving their door unlocked in a dangerous neighborhood. In her restlessness, Callie secretly relapses into drug use. Tricia decides to finally sign Daniel's death certificate and go out on a date with Mallory, only to meet a bloody and barefoot Daniel suddenly appearing in front of her house.

At the hospital, doctors diagnose Daniel as severely malnourished, dehydrated, and physically abused. Daniel seems surprised that others can see him and can only explain that he was "underneath.” He does not respond to any question and seems to be in deep fear of the tunnel in front of his house. Mallory comes by to talk with Tricia, attempting to convince her to leave Daniel and be with him. Though she refuses, the two kiss. At the same time, Daniel explains to Callie that he made a trade with an insectoid creature that hides in the walls of the tunnel. Callie investigates strange movements by the bathroom and is knocked unconscious. When she wakes, she sees a creature pull Daniel into the tunnel and through the tunnel's solid walls. Callie lies about her relapse in front of the detectives, but Tricia finds her stash and accuses her of hallucinating the incident. In response, Callie shows Tricia information she found on the internet about cases of people who went missing in the neighborhood from the past 100 years, including Walter; Lambert's son claims that he was taken by monsters.

The next day, the police discover Walter's bloody body at the entrance to the tunnel, while the man Callie saw earlier is revealed to be his son, Jamie. The police accuse Jamie of kidnapping local pets, and he implies that he has been offering them as sacrifices to recover his father. Tricia and Callie are attacked by the creature, who kidnaps Tricia. Callie files a missing person report before returning to the tunnel to offer a "trade,” wishing to sacrifice her life in return for Tricia's. To her shock, the creature brings back Tricia's unborn fetus instead. The creature then proceeds to claim her, leaving only her empty shoe behind.

Mallory finds an envelope Callie left for him that contains her research. His fellow detective, Lonergan, assures him that they will keep the cases open indefinitely. He speculates that Jamie, whom he suspects to be a serial killer, may have killed Tricia and Callie, but Mallory chooses to believe that Callie ran away and Tricia is happily living off the land somewhere. While Mallory puts up posters, he sees an apparition of Callie standing in the tunnel, but when he investigates more closely, she is gone. As he walks away, Callie watches him from the tunnel as the creature's limb rests on her shoulder.

== Cast ==
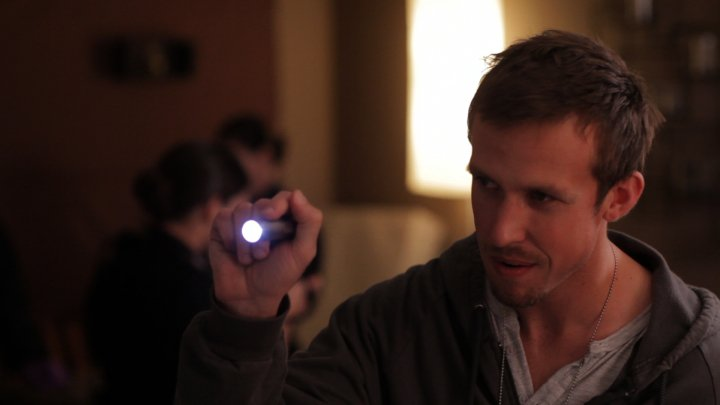
Justin Gordon as Detective Lonergan

- Katie Parker as Callie Russel
- Courtney Bell as Tricia Riley
- Dave Levine as Det. Ryan Mallory
- Justin Gordon as Det. Lonergan
- Morgan Peter Brown as Daniel Riley
- James Flanagan as Jamie Lambert
- Scott Graham as Dr. Elliott
- Ian Gregory as Mitch
- Doug Jones as Walter Lambert
- Connie Ventress as Ruth

== Production ==
In January 2024, on the Scream Dreams Podcast, Flanagan shared that the film was subconsciously inspired by the 1983 Fraggle Rock episode "The Terrible Tunnel".

== Release ==
=== Film festival screenings ===
Absentia debuted on March 3, 2011 at the Fargo Film Festival, and opened in other film festivals on the dates given below.

Country	Release date	Festival
United States	March 3, 2011	Fargo Film Festival
United States	March 10, 2011	San Luis Obispo International Film Festival
United States	April 1, 2011	Phoenix Film Festival
Australia	April 8, 2011	A Night of Horror International Film Festival
United States	April 8, 2011	Arizona International Film Festival
United States	April 8, 2011	Sonoma International Film Festival
United States	June 4, 2011	Pittsburgh Horror Film Festival
United States	June 6, 2011	Another Hole in The Head Film Festival
United States	July 22, 2011	Blue Whiskey Independent Film Festival
United States	July 23, 2011	Action On Film International Film Festival
United States	July 23, 2011	Fright Night Film Festival
Canada	July 28, 2011	Fantasia Film Festival
United States	September 18, 2011	Maelstrom International Fantastic Film Festival
United States	September 24, 2011	Chicago Horror Film Festival
Canada	September 29, 2011	Edmonton International Film Festival
United States	September 30, 2011	Big Bear Horro-Fi Film Festival
United States	October 1, 2011	ShockerFest International Film Festival
United States	October 2, 2011	Shriekfest
United States	October 8, 2011	Freak Show Horror Film Festival
United States	October 14, 2011	All Things Horror Presents Shudder Fest
United States	October 22, 2011	Sacramento Horror Film Festival
United States	October 22, 2011	Thriller! Chiller! Film Festival
Canada	October 24, 2011	Toronto After Dark Film Festival
United States	October 26, 2011	Buffalo Screams Horror Film Festival
Italy	October 26, 2011	Ravenna Nightmare Film Festival
United States	October 27, 2011	Eerie Horror Film Festival
United States	October 28, 2011	Rhode Island International Horror Film Festival
United States	October 29, 2011	New Orleans Horror Film Festival
United States	October 31, 2011	Frank N' Con
United Kingdom	October 31, 2011	Bram Stoker International Film Festival
Indonesia	November 14, 2011	Indonesia International Fantastic Film Festival

=== Home media ===
The film was later acquired by Phase 4 Films for North American DVD and Video on Demand distribution.

== Reception ==
According to the review aggregator website Rotten Tomatoes, 87% of critics have given the film a positive review based on 15 reviews, with an average rating of 7.1/10. Metacritic, which uses a weighted average, assigned the film a score of 68 out of 100, based on 5 critics, indicating "generally favorable" reviews.

Andrew Mack of Twitch Film wrote that the film does not live up its hype, but "it is still an effective and creepy supernatural horror." Devin Ashby of CraveOnline rated it 9/10 stars and called it "intense, haunting and refreshingly terrifying". Martin Unsworth of Starburst rated it 9/10 stars and called it an instant cult favorite. Dennis Harvey of Variety called it creepy and non-formulaic, though he criticized the lack of a strong payoff in the climax. David Harley of Bloody Disgusting rated it 3/5 stars and called it a "genuinely creepy" film that suffers from a low budget. Debi Moore of Dread Central rated it 4/5 stars and called it "both thought-provoking and thoroughly entertaining." Scott Weinberg of Fearnet wrote that "Absentia certainly won't blow your speakers (or your mind), but it's still a very strong piece of independent genre filmmaking: a melancholy tale of loss that's only peripherally a horror flick, but a good one all the same."

=== Awards ===
Absentia earned various awards in categories ranging from recognition of the film itself to its screenplay, direction and editing, to the performance of the lead actors.

Year	Festival	Award	Recipients
2011	Shriekfest	Best Horror Feature Film	Mike Flanagan
2011	Sacramento Horror Film Festival	Best of Festival (Feature Film)	Mike Flanagan
2011	Maelstrom International Fantastic Film Festival	Best Feature (Jury Award)	Mike Flanagan
2011	Freak Show Horror Film Festival	Best Horror Feature	Mike Flanagan
2011	Sonoma International Film Festival	Best Narrative Feature	Mike Flanagan
2011	Phoenix Film Festival	Best Horror Feature	Mike Flanagan
2011	Rhode Island Horror Film Festival	First Place	Mike Flanagan
2011	ShockerFest International Film Festival	Best Horror Feature	Mike Flanagan
2011	Buffalo Screams Film Festival	Best Horror Feature	Mike Flanagan
2011	Buffalo Screams Film Festival	Best Director (Feature)	Mike Flanagan
2011	Buffalo Screams Film Festival	Best Screenplay (Feature)	Mike Flanagan
2011	New Orleans Horror Film Festival	Best Screenplay	Mike Flanagan
2011	Thriller! Chiller! Film Festival	Best Thrill Award	Mike Flanagan
2011	A Night of Horror International Film Festival	Director's Choice Award	Mike Flanagan
2011	Tabloid Witch Awards	Best Horror Feature Film	Mike Flanagan
2011	Tabloid Witch Awards	Best Actress	Katie Parker & Courtney Bell
2011	Tabloid Witch Awards	Best Actor	Dave Levine
2011	Tabloid Witch Awards	Best Supporting Actor	Morgan Peter Brown
2011	Tabloid Witch Awards	Best Sound	Richard Ragon
2011	Blue Whiskey Independent Film Festival	Best Sound	Gypsy Sound
2011	Fargo Film Festival	Honorable Mention	Mike Flanagan
2013	Fangoria	Best Limited-Release/Direct-to-video Film	Mike Flanagan
