= Mike Flanagan (filmmaker) =

American filmmaker (born 1978)

- Flanagan in 2026
- Born: May 20, 1978 (age 48); Salem, Massachusetts, U.S.
- Occupations: Film director; editor; screenwriter; producer
- Years active: 2000–present
- Spouse: Kate Siegel (m. 2016)
- Children: 3
- Website: mikeflanaganfilm.com

Mike Flanagan (born May 20, 1978) is an American filmmaker, best known for his horror work. Flanagan wrote, directed, and edited the films Absentia (2011), Oculus (2013), Hush, Before I Wake, Ouija: Origin of Evil (all 2016), Gerald's Game (2017), Doctor Sleep (2019), The Life of Chuck (2024), and the upcoming The Exorcist: Martyrs (2027). He also wrote the first draft of the script for the film Clayface (2026) for the DC Universe. He created, wrote, produced, and served as showrunner on the Netflix horror series The Haunting of Hill House (2018), The Haunting of Bly Manor (2020), Midnight Mass (2021), The Midnight Club (2022), and The Fall of the House of Usher (2023), and the Amazon Prime Video series Carrie (2026).

Flanagan often works with the same cast and crew members. His most frequent collaborators include his wife, actress Kate Siegel, who stars in most of his works since Oculus, co-wrote the screenplay of Hush, and directed an episode of Carrie. Other frequent collaborators include Samantha Sloyan, Carla Gugino, Rahul Kohli, Karen Gillan, Bruce Greenwood, Michael Trucco, Annalise Basso, Matthew Lillard, Henry Thomas, Stephen King, and Mark Hamill.

== Early life ==
Mike Flanagan was born in Salem, Massachusetts, on May 20, 1978, to parents Timothy and Laura Flanagan. He has a younger sibling, Jamie. Their family moved around often due to his father's job in the U.S. Coast Guard, at one point living on Governors Island. Though their time in Salem was brief, it left an impression on Flanagan, and he retained an interest in both the Salem witch trials and associated topics such as ghost stories and horror fiction.

He later lived in Maryland, where he was a student at Archbishop Spalding High School, becoming involved in the drama department and the president of the school's Student Government Association, before attending Towson University. He graduated with a BA, majoring in Electronic Media & Film and minoring in Theater.

Growing up, Flanagan was a fan of Stephen King, whose work he would later adapt to the screen; he read It in fifth grade and Gerald's Game—which he would later adapt—in college.

== Career ==
=== 2000s–2010s ===
Flanagan's student films were more oriented toward melodrama. He later characterized them as "unfit for public consumption" but called them "incredible learning experiences". After graduating, he directed Ghosts of Hamilton Street (2003), filmed in Maryland with local actors, including Scott Graham, whom Flanagan met at Towson. Graham would go on to star in Flanagan's 2006 short film, Oculus: Chapter 3 – The Man with the Plan, which he made for $1,500.

Flanagan originally intended for the Oculus story to be told in a series of short films, but he could not find the financing. Instead, he shot the chapter that included a back story and used that to demonstrate that he could direct a horror film. The short proved popular at film festivals, and producers were interested in developing the concept. However, they either wanted to shoot it as a found footage film or rejected Flanagan's stipulation that he direct the feature-length adaptation. Flanagan directed Absentia (2011), which was financed through a Kickstarter campaign, in response to this rejection. Made for $70,000 and filmed in his Glendale, California, apartment, Absentia was released direct-to-video but gained popularity when Netflix offered it on its streaming service. After its surprise success, Flanagan continued to shop Oculus around. Intrepid Pictures took an interest in the concept and agreed to let Flanagan direct. The feature version of Oculus was filmed in 2012 and released theatrically by Relativity Media in 2014.

Flanagan shot his next film, Before I Wake, in 2013. It was acquired by Relativity Media in 2014 and was originally scheduled for release on May 8, 2015, but was pushed back to September 25, 2015, and later pulled from the schedule entirely when the company filed for bankruptcy. After a year in bankruptcy court, Relativity announced that Before I Wake would be released on April 8, 2016, but missed that date as the company struggled to get back on its feet. The film was then scheduled for September 9, 2016, but Relativity once again pulled the film three weeks ahead of this date, prompting a public argument between Flanagan and Relativity CEO Ryan Kavanaugh on Twitter; Kavanaugh claimed September 9 was a "bad date" while Flanagan suggested that Relativity was financially unable to release the film. Relativity never released the film as Kavanaugh sold the company to Singaporean social network YuuZoo in October 2016, with Netflix eventually acquiring the rights to the film and releasing it in January 2018.

Flanagan wrote and directed Ouija: Origin of Evil, which starred Elizabeth Reaser, Henry Thomas, and Annalise Basso. Production began in September 2015, and the film was released in October 2016, grossing over $81 million worldwide. Around the same time, it was revealed that Flanagan had been working on a "secret project" called Hush. Written in 2014 and filmed in March 2015, the project was kept confidential until a screening at the Toronto Film Festival. Written by Flanagan and lead actress Kate Siegel, and also starring John Gallagher Jr., Michael Trucco, and Samantha Sloyan, the film had its world premiere at SXSW in March 2016 and was released exclusively on Netflix on April 8, 2016 to positive reviews. Speaking of his first Stephen King adaptation, the 2017 psychological horror film Gerald's Game, whose original 1992 novel had long been thought to be unfilmable, he said: "I would joke that it's the only one of his works that could never, ever be made into a movie. And I spent the next half of my life thinking about ways to adapt it." The film, which he directed, wrote and edited, was released on Netflix on September 29, 2017 to critical acclaim. King called the film "hypnotic, horrifying and terrific" after watching the rough cut.

In 2018, Flanagan created, wrote, directed, produced, and edited the Netflix supernatural horror series The Haunting of Hill House, based on Shirley Jackson's novel of the same name. In 2019, Flanagan wrote and directed the horror film Doctor Sleep, based on the novel of the same name by Stephen King, itself the sequel to his previous novel The Shining. Ewan McGregor stars as the older version of Danny Torrance in the film, which was released in November. In February 2019, The Haunting of Hill House was renewed for a stand-alone second season, titled The Haunting of Bly Manor, based on the novel The Turn of the Screw by Henry James. It premiered in 2020. Around the same time, it was also announced that Flanagan had signed an exclusive overall deal with Netflix to produce television content.

In July 2019, as part of that overall deal, Netflix ordered Flanagan's original horror series Midnight Mass. Flanagan wrote, directed and served as showrunner on the seven-episode series, which was released in September 2021 to critical acclaim after a production delay in 2020 caused by the COVID-19 pandemic.

=== 2020s–present ===
In May 2020, it was announced that Flanagan would adapt numerous novels by Christopher Pike into a new series, titled The Midnight Club, for Netflix. Flanagan co-created the series and serves as executive producer and showrunner.

In October 2021, it was announced that Flanagan would create The Fall of the House of Usher, an eight-episode limited series for Netflix based on the short story of the same name and other works by Edgar Allan Poe. Flanagan directed four episodes of the series, with the other four helmed by his longtime cinematographer Michael Fimognari.

In May 2023, it was announced that Flanagan would adapt King's drama novella The Life of Chuck from the short story collection If It Bleeds into a feature film starring Tom Hiddleston and Mark Hamill. The film had its world premiere at the Toronto International Film Festival on September 6, 2024, where it won the People's Choice Award and was released in theaters of June 6, 2025.

In May 2024, Flanagan launched his own company, Red Room Pictures. In July 2024, Flanagan was confirmed to write a segment for the anthology film V/H/S/Beyond, which was titled Stowaway, and released exclusively on Shudder on October 4, 2024.

In December 2024, Flanagan was attached to a film based on the DC Comics character Clayface, a project he had initially pitched to DC Studios co-CEOs James Gunn and Peter Safran in March 2023. He is set to write the project while the studio searched for a director amidst his ongoing commitments to The Exorcist reboot and the Carrie series. Clayface was greenlit that month as a film set in Gunn and Safran's DC Universe (DCU) franchise, with the pair producing alongside The Batman (2022) director Matt Reeves and Lynn Harris from Reeves' studio 6th & Idaho Productions. By February 21, 2025, James Watkins was chosen to direct the film. In May 2025, it was announced that Hossein Amini had been hired to rewrite the script and that Flanagan was no longer involved in the project and said he expected Watkins to "make it [his] own", but he hoped the film would remain true to the spirit of what he originally wanted it to be.

In October 2024, Flanagan announced he was developing a television miniseries adaptation of Stephen King's Carrie novel for Amazon MGM Studios. Carrie premiered on October 7, 2026, on Amazon Prime Video. In October 2026, despite originally billed as a miniseries, Amazon Prime Video renewed the series for a second season.

=== Upcoming projects ===
In December 2022, Flanagan signed a first-look overall TV deal with Amazon Studios. Flanagan also owns the television rights to The Dark Tower series of fantasy novels written by Stephen King.

By May 2024, Flanagan was in talks to direct the next film in The Exorcist franchise. Later that month, Flanagan was confirmed to be directing a new Exorcist film as a reboot with plans for a new trilogy being scrapped following the reception of The Exorcist: Believer (2023). The film was originally scheduled for release on March 13, 2026, but Flanagan revealed in a Tumblr post that the film was not going to begin production until after he finished work on the miniseries adaptation of Carrie and that there was "no way it's coming out next March." The film, titled The Exorcist: Martyrs and starring Scarlett Johansson, is set for release on March 12, 2027.

In February 2026, it was announced that Flanagan would write and direct a new film adaption of Stephen King's The Mist for Warner Bros. Pictures. In March 2026, he signed an overall deal with Amazon MGM Studios for television. In July 2026, Games Workshop announced that Flanagan had been brought on by Amazon to work as a writer on an upcoming Warhammer 40,000 project. In September 2026, it was announced that Flanagan would produce Rot, a psychological body horror film starring Cooper Koch and directed by Alexandra Magistro, an executive at Flanagan's Red Room Pictures who is making her feature directorial debut.

== Recognition ==
Flanagan's work has attracted praise from figures such as William Friedkin, Stephen King, and Quentin Tarantino for his directing style and lack of reliance on jump scares. Paradoxically, the first episode of his series The Midnight Club (2022) set a new Guinness World Record for the most jump scares in a single episode of television with 21. However, Flanagan stated that this jump-scare sequence was in direct response to studio notes requesting more jump scares, and he designed this 21-scare scene so that the "jump scare(s) would be rendered meaningless."

In 2025, Flanagan was invited to join the Academy of Motion Picture Arts and Sciences as a member.

== Frequent collaborators ==
Flanagan is known for his recurring collaborations with certain actors. When asked about this tendency and the recurring collaborator section on his Wikipedia page, he described such collaboration (including having other directors on his shows) as being "something that's very necessary as our company has grown and as our shows have grown". Of career-long DP Michael Fimognari and 1st A.D. Morgan Beggs he said "I trust those people with my life".

Frequent actor collaborations (3 or more projects)
Work Actor	Absentia (2011)	Oculus (2013)	Hush (2016)	Before I Wake (2016)	Ouija: Origin of Evil (2016)	Gerald's Game (2017)	The Haunting of Hill House (2018)	Doctor Sleep (2019)	The Haunting of Bly Manor (2020)	Midnight Mass (2021)	The Midnight Club (2022)	The Fall of the House of Usher (2023)	The Life of Chuck (2024)	Carrie (2026)	The Exorcist: Martyrs (2027)	Total roles
Crystal Balint										Dolly Scarborough	Maggie	Morella Usher		Nancy Piper		4
Annalise Basso		Young Kaylie Russell			Lina Zander								Janice Halliday	Student Caller #2		4
Courtney Bell	Tricia Riley	Auctioneer		Andrea Morgan												3
Matt Biedel										Sturge	Tim Pawluk	William "Bill-T" Wilson	Doctor Winston		TBA	5
Ruth Codd											Anya	Juno Usher		Cara		3
Alex Essoe								Wendy Torrance	Charlotte Wingrave	Mildred Gunning	Poppy Corn	Court Witness				5
Jamie Flanagan	Jamie Lambert	Tobin Capp				Court Clerk	Funeral Director	Diesel Doug			Group Leader					6
Zach Gilford										Riley Flynn	Mark	Young Roderick Usher				3
Annabeth Gish				Natalie Friedman			Clara Dudley			Dr. Sarah Gunning		Eliza Usher				4
Justin Gordon	Det. Lonergan	Mark		Dr. Tennant												3
Bruce Greenwood						Gerald Burlingame		Dr. John Dalton				Roderick Usher				3
Carla Gugino						Jessie Burlingame	Olivia Crain		Jamie Taylor a.k.a. The Storyteller	Judge		Verna	Television Voiceover	Adult Caller	TBA	8
Mark Hamill												Arthur Gordon Pym	Albie Krantz	Damon Nostra		3
Rahul Kohli									Owen Sharma	Sheriff Hassan Shabazz	Vincent Beggs	Leo Usher	Bri	Seth Peist	TBA	7
Hamish Linklater										Father Paul Hill			American reporter		TBA	3
Robert Longstreet							Horace Dudley	Barry the Chunk		Joe Collie	Janitor	William Longfellow			TBA	6
Carl Lumbly								Dick Hallorann				C. Auguste Dupin	Sam Yarbrough		TBA	4
Violet McGraw							Young Nell Crain	Violet Hansen					Lily			3
Katie Parker	Callie Russel	Phone Store Clerk					Poppy Hill	Silent Sarey	Perdita Willoughby		Aceso	Annabel Lee				7
Molly C. Quinn								Mrs. Grady				Jenny	Mrs. Krantz			3
Igby Rigney										Warren Flynn	Kevin	Toby				3
Natalie Roers	Jogger			Katie		Reporter										3
Sauriyan Sapkota											Amesh	Prospero "Perry" Usher	Ram			3
Kate Siegel		Marisol Chavez	Madison Young		Jenny Browning	Sally	Theodora Crain		Viola Willoughby	Erin Greene		Camille L'Espanaye	Miss Richards	Adelaide	TBA	11
Samantha Sloyan			Sarah Greene				Leigh Crain			Bev Keane	Shasta	Tamerlane Usher	Miss Rohrbacher	Margaret White	TBA	8
Henry Thomas					Father Tom Hogan	Tom	Young Hugh Crain	The Bartender Jack Torrance	Henry Wingrave	Ed Flynn	Freedom Jack	Frederick Usher				8
Jacob Tremblay				Cody Morgan				Bradley Trevor					Charles "Chuck" Krantz			3
Michael Trucco			John Stanley							Wade Scarborough	Frederick	Rufus Griswold	Dylan's Dad	John Hargensen		6
Lulu Wilson					Doris Zander		Young Shirley Crain					Young Madeline Usher				3

== Personal life ==
In February 2016, Flanagan married actress and frequent collaborator Kate Siegel, with whom he has a son and a daughter. Flanagan was formerly in a relationship with actress Courtney Bell, who starred in his film Absentia, and with whom he has a son. His younger sibling, Jamie, has worked as a screenwriter, producer and actor on several of Mike's series. As of October 2026, Flanagan is 8 years sober.

Flanagan spent years studying various religions, later describing Midnight Mass as a passion project that was "deeply personal" and dealt intimately with his Catholic upbringing and his eventual atheism, as well as his sobriety.

== Filmography ==
=== Feature film ===
Year	Title	Director	Writer	Editor	Producer
2011	Absentia	Yes	Yes	Yes	Yes
2013	Oculus	Yes	Yes	Yes	No
2016	Hush	Yes	Yes	Yes	No
2016	Before I Wake	Yes	Yes	Yes	No
2016	Ouija: Origin of Evil	Yes	Yes	Yes	No
2017	Gerald's Game	Yes	Yes	Yes	No
2019	Doctor Sleep	Yes	Yes	Yes	No
2024	The Life of Chuck	Yes	Yes	Yes	Yes
2026	Clayface	No	Yes	No	No
2027	The Exorcist: Martyrs †	Yes	Yes	Yes	Yes

=== Feature-length student film ===
Year	Title	Director	Writer	Editor	Producer	Composer
2000	Makebelieve	Yes	Yes	Yes	No	Yes
2001	Still Life	Yes	Yes	Yes	Yes	Yes
2003	Ghosts of Hamilton Street	Yes	Yes	Yes	No	No

=== Short film ===
Year	Title	Director	Writer	Editor	Producer	Notes
2006	Oculus: Chapter 3 – The Man with the Plan	Yes	Yes	Uncredited	Yes	
2024	Stowaway	No	Yes	No	No	Segment for V/H/S/Beyond

Executive producer

Year	Title	Notes
2017	Dobaara: See Your Evil	Also story writer Indian remake of Oculus
2024	Shelby Oaks	
2025	The Room Returns	Also actor Role: Peter

Other

Year	Title	Notes
2025	Boorman and the Devil	Interviewee

=== Television ===
Year	Title	Director	Writer	Editor	Executive producer	Creator
2018	The Haunting of Hill House	Yes	4 episodes	1 episode	Yes	Yes
2020	The Haunting of Bly Manor	1 episode	1 episode	4 episodes	Yes	Yes
2021	Midnight Mass	Yes	Yes	Yes	Yes	Yes
2022	The Midnight Club	2 episodes	9 episodes	6 episodes	Yes	Yes
2023	The Fall of the House of Usher	4 episodes	7 episodes	4 episodes	Yes	Yes
2026	Carrie	4 episodes	2 episodes	Yes	Yes	Developer

Editor only

Year	Title	Notes
2005	Untold Stories of the E.R.	Associate, documentary series
2007	Bone Detectives	Documentary series
2008	Your Place or Mine?	Reality series
2008	Super Swank	Documentary series
2008–2009	Machines of Malice	Documentary series
2009	Pinks: All Out	Reality series
2009	Million Dollar Listing Los Angeles	Reality series
2009–2010	Most Daring	Reality series
2010	Design School	Reality series
2010	Hot in Cleveland	Episode: "Behind the Hotness"

== Awards and nominations ==
Award	Date of ceremony	Category	Film	Result	Ref.
Maelstrom International Fantastic Film Festival	September 18, 2011	Best Feature (Jury Award)	Absentia	Won	
Shriekfest	October 2, 2011	Best Horror Feature Film	Absentia	Won	
Writers Guild of America Awards	February 17, 2019	New Series	The Haunting of Hill House	Nominated	
Fangoria Chainsaw Awards	February 25, 2019	Best Series	The Haunting of Hill House	Won	
Saturn Awards	October 26, 2021	Best Director	Doctor Sleep	Nominated	
Saturn Awards	October 26, 2021	Best Writing	Doctor Sleep	Nominated	
Saturn Awards	October 26, 2021	Best Editing	Doctor Sleep	Nominated	
Bram Stoker Award	May 14, 2022	Superior Achievement in a Screenplay	Midnight Mass ("Book VI: Acts of the Apostles")	Won	
Writers Guild of America Awards	March 20, 2022	Original Long Form	Midnight Mass	Nominated	
Fargo Film Festival	March 25, 2023	Ted M. Larson Award	—	Honored	
Fantasia International Film Festival	September 6, 2024	Cheval Noir Award	The Life of Chuck	Won	
