= The Fearway =

- Theatrical release poster
- Directed by: Robert Gajic
- Written by: Noah Bessey, Simon Phillips
- Produced by: Mem Ferda
- Starring: Shannon Dalonzo; Eileen Dietz; Simon Phillips; Jessica Gray
- Cinematography: David Gordon
- Edited by: Robert Gajic
- Music by: Darren Morze
- Production companies: Cupsogue Pictures, Dystopian Films, FilmCore, Finch Fortress Films, Nine10 Productions, Sucheta DreamWorks Productions
- Distributed by: Black Mandala
- Release date: February 7, 2023 (United States)
- Running time: 81 minutes
- Country: United States
- Language: English

The Fearway is a 2023 American horror film directed by Robert Gajic and starring Shannon Dalonzo, Eileen Dietz, Simon Phillips, and Jessica Gray.

== Plot ==
A young couple is traveling in their car along the famous Highway 66, which runs through Death Valley. Suddenly, they notice a strange pursuer behind them. This trip turns into a real repeated nightmare in a time loop for them.

Despite their efforts to escape the mysterious driver in the black muscle car, the couple keeps returning to the same isolated stretch of road. Seeking help, they stop at a retro 1950s-style diner, where the staff behave oddly and seem to know more than they reveal. The eerie, dreamlike atmosphere deepens as the couple realizes they may be trapped in a supernatural limbo.

Clues, such as two quarters handed to them by a silent waitress, hint at a symbolic connection to the afterlife. As the pursuit continues and attempts at escape fail, it becomes clear that the enigmatic driver represents Death itself. In the end, although they appear to get away, the loop resets—leaving the couple facing the inevitability of their fate.

== Cast ==
- Shannon Dalonzo as Sarah Collins
- Simon Phillips as The Manager
- Eileen Dietz as Old Woman
- John D. Hickman as Bus Boy
- Jessica Gray as Waitress
- Justin Gordon as Michael
- Briahn Auguillard as The Ferryman
- Robin Bookhout as Crazy woman
- James Politano as Old Man
- Heather Rozzo as 911 Operator

== Reception ==
The Fearway received a mixed critical reception, with some praising its atmosphere and visual style, while others criticized its pacing and story development.

Paul Mount of Starburst praised the film's cinematography, calling it "superb for a low budget feature." He appreciated the film’s ability to create "a sense of tension and unease rather than full-blooded horror," though he felt the resolution was "quite clever if a little under-developed."

In a more positive take, Roger Crow of On-Magazine.UK remarked that the film offered a refreshing change from typical stalk-and-slash thrillers. He likened the twist ending to something from The Twilight Zone and considered that "no bad thing," noting the effectiveness of the desert highway setting.

However, not all critics were impressed. Leslie Felperin of The Guardian described the film as "lumpy" and "tedious," criticizing the repetitive structure and suggesting that the mystery at the heart of the story failed to deliver. She described it as a "Groundhog Day road horror" that ultimately became "a real highway to hell."

Sean Cockwell of My Bloody Reviews offered a more favorable perspective, describing the film as "fast-paced, well-produced and photographed." While he acknowledged early frustrations with the central couple, he found the film enjoyable overall. He also highlighted a cameo by Eileen Dietz of The Exorcist and praised Simon Phillips’ performance as The Manager.
