= Before I Wake (2016 film) =

2016 film by Mike Flanagan

- Theatrical release poster
- Directed by: Mike Flanagan
- Written by: Mike Flanagan; Jeff Howard
- Produced by: Sam Englebardt; William D. Johnson; Trevor Macy
- Starring: Kate Bosworth; Thomas Jane; Jacob Tremblay; Annabeth Gish; Dash Mihok; Topher Bousquet
- Cinematography: Michael Fimognari
- Edited by: Mike Flanagan
- Music by: Danny Elfman; The Newton Brothers
- Production companies: Intrepid Pictures; Demarest Films; MICA Entertainment
- Distributed by: Netflix (Note: Screened at the 2016 Fantasia International Film Festival with Relativity Media serving as distributor, Netflix released the film overseas on April 28, 2017 along with a Blu-ray release and later bought U.S. distribution rights as well following Relativity filing for bankruptcy.)
- Release dates: July 31, 2016 (Fantasia); January 5, 2018 (United States)
- Running time: 97 minutes
- Country: United States
- Language: English
- Box office: $4.9 million

Before I Wake (also known as Somnia in some international territories) is a 2016 American supernatural dark fantasy horror film directed and edited by Mike Flanagan, and co-written by Flanagan and Jeff Howard. The film stars Kate Bosworth, Thomas Jane, Jacob Tremblay, Annabeth Gish, Topher Bousquet and Dash Mihok. Before I Wake premiered at the Fantasia International Film Festival on July 31, 2016, and Netflix released it in the United States on January 5, 2018. The film grossed over $4.9 million worldwide and received positive reviews from critics.

== Plot ==
Jessie and Mark Hobson take in a foster child, 8-year-old Cody Morgan, after their young son Sean dies from an accidental drowning. Social worker Natalie Friedman informs Mark and Jessie that when Cody was three years old, his mother died of cancer, and that two previous attempts to place him with foster parents were unsuccessful.

On his first night with the Hobsons, before Cody goes to sleep, he tells Jessie about a nightmarish creature called "the Canker Man". Jessie brushes the story off and tells Cody that nightmares cannot harm anyone. Later that night, Jessie and Mark are amazed as multicolored butterflies flutter across the living room. Mark tries to catch a blue butterfly to show Cody, who likes butterflies, but when Cody wakes up, the butterflies are gone. The next day at school, he befriends a girl named Annie and antagonizes a mean student named Tate. At home, Cody asks Mark who the child in a living room picture is, and Mark replies that it is Sean. That night, the couple sees their deceased child and tries to hug him. When Cody wakes up, Sean disappears. Upon realizing Cody's gift for making his dreams a reality, Jessie shows him home videos of Sean. Her dead son appears and acts out scenes from the videos. Days later, Mark accuses his wife of using Cody for his gift instead of loving him and takes down the pictures of Sean.

Cody falls asleep at school, and "the Canker Man" appears before Tate and devours him, while Annie watches in horror and screams, waking him up. Meanwhile, Jessie goes to a doctor and complains that Cody has trouble sleeping. The doctor prescribes medication. She mixes it with Cody's drink, unbeknownst to Mark. That night, Sean again appears before them, this time resembling the Canker Man, and Mark cannot wake Cody. The Canker Man devours Mark and knocks Jessie unconscious. She wakes as Cody calls 911. Suspicious of Mark's sudden disappearance and suspecting domestic violence, social services takes Cody away to an orphanage.

When Natalie ignores Jessie's requests to speak to Cody to find out how to get Mark back, Jessie steals her files on Cody. She tracks down his first foster father, Whelan Young. He tells Jessie that when his wife fell sick, reminding Cody of his mother, she was killed in the same way Mark was. Cody's dreams brought her back as only a hollow replica. Cody's second set of foster parents disappeared in a similar manner. Whelan concludes that the only way to stop Cody's nightmares is to kill Cody, and asks Jessie to try, but she objects. She continues investigating and finds a box of Cody's mother's belongings that contains a butterfly-shaped pillow and a journal.

Jessie arrives at the orphanage late at night to find it dark and haunted by Cody's nightmares, with the other children tied by vines to the walls. When she finds Cody, the Canker Man attacks her until she shows it the butterfly pillow. As she hugs the monster, it takes the form of Cody and disappears along with the vines. Jessie takes the still-unconscious Cody home.

The following day, Jessie reads Cody his mother's journal, which describes how much she had loved him and his gift. Jessie shows him the word "cancer", which he mispronounces as "canker", and deduces that the Canker Man is actually Cody's fading memories of his mother, pale and disfigured due to the cancer. Jessie expresses admiration for Cody's gift, and he acknowledges her as his new mother.

== Cast ==
- Kate Bosworth as Jessie Hobson
- Thomas Jane as Mark Hobson
- Jacob Tremblay as Cody Morgan
- Annabeth Gish as Natalie Friedman
- Topher Bousquet as The Canker Man
- Dash Mihok as Whelan Young
- Jay Karnes as Peter
- Lance E. Nichols as Detective Brown
- Kyla Deaver as Annie
- Hunter Wenzel as Tate
- Antonio Evan Romero as Sean
- Scottie Thompson as Teacher
- Justin Gordon as Dr. Tennant
- Courtney Bell as Andrea Morgan
- Natalie Roers as Katie

== Production ==
On September 7, 2013, it was announced that Oculus director Mike Flanagan was set to direct a horror film called Somnia he co-wrote with Jeff Howard for Intrepid Pictures, and that the producers would be Trevor Macy and William D. Johnson, with Demarest Films' Sam Englebardt co-producing and co-financing the film with MICA Entertainment headed by Dale Armin Johnson. Focus Features International initially handled international sales of the film. On November 7, 2013, it was announced that Sierra/Affinity would now handle all international rights which were previously held by FFI. On April 4, 2014, Relativity Media acquired the US distribution rights to the film. In March 2015, the title was changed to Before I Wake, apparently over Flanagan's objections.

On November 7, 2013, Kate Bosworth and Thomas Jane joined the lead cast of the film as the child's parents, and Jacob Tremblay was set to play as Cody. On November 18, 2013, Annabeth Gish joined the cast of the film to play Natalie, the case worker assigned to young Cody.

Filming commenced on November 11, 2013, in Fairhope, Alabama. On December 12, 2013, the crew filmed scenes at Barton Academy. Filming completed on December 16, 2013.

== Music ==
The music was composed by Danny Elfman and the Newton Brothers.

== Release ==
On April 4, 2014, Relativity Media acquired the US distribution rights to the film. The release was originally scheduled for May 8, 2015, but was pushed back to September 25, 2015, and later pulled from the schedule due to the company's filing for bankruptcy. Despite this, the film managed to get a theatrical release in some international territories as early as April 2016. The U.S. release was rescheduled to September 9, 2016, but was again pulled from the schedule.

In June 2016, it was announced that the film would have its North American premiere at the Fantasia International Film Festival on July 31, 2016, while still being distributed by Relativity Media. Excluding the United States, Netflix released the movie worldwide on April 28, 2017, and also on Blu-ray and DVD in Canada. Mike Flanagan encouraged U.S. audiences to buy the film on physical media from Canada. In December 2017, it was revealed that Netflix had obtained the U.S. rights to the film from Relativity Media, thus owning worldwide rights. Netflix released the film in the United States on January 5, 2018.

== Reception ==
The film holds a 67% approval rating on the review aggregator website Rotten Tomatoes based on 36 reviews and an average rating of 6.47/10 and the consensus reads "Beware this waking nightmare: Before I Wake isn't always lucid enough to escape its wobbly story, but crafts a neat horror landscape of grief". At Metacritic, which assigns scores of critic reviews, it has a weighted average score of 68 out of 100 based on 5 reviews, indicating "generally favorable" reviews.

Ignatiy Vishnevetsky of The A.V. Club gave the film a B grade, writing: "Horror movies that exploit broad childhood phobias about bedtime lights-outs and basement chores are a dime a dozen, but it's really refreshing to find one made with a parent's curiosity and concern for a child's point of view." Brian Tallerico of RogerEbert.com gave the film 2.5/4 stars, deeming it "A flawed film, but there are elements that really work, especially the lead performance and some of Flanagan's gifts with composition." Reagan Gavin Rasquinha of The Times of India was more critical, giving it 2/5 stars and writing: "This is at best, cookie-cutter horror that joins the dots, fine, but it doesn't dish out anything memorable."

Charles Bramesco of The Guardian ranked it 3rd in a list of the 10 scariest Netflix original films.
