= Gehenna: Where Death Lives =

2016 horror film

- Theatrical release poster
- Directed by: Hiroshi Katagiri
- Screenplay by: Hiroshi Katagiri; Nathan Long; Brad Palmer
- Produced by: Koodae Kim
- Starring: Justin Gordon; Eva Swan; Simon Phillips; Doug Jones; Lance Henriksen; Patrick Gorman
- Cinematography: Yohei Tateishi
- Edited by: Yoshio Kohashi
- Music by: Yuan Liu
- Distributed by: Uncork'd Entertainment
- Release dates: October 6, 2016 (Shriekfest Film Festival); June 30, 2018
- Running time: 105 minutes
- Countries: Saipan, United States
- Language: English

Gehenna: Where Death Lives is a 2016 American-Japanese horror film directed by Hiroshi Katagiri. An international co-production between the United States and Japan, the film stars Justin Gordon, Eva Swan, Simon Phillips, Doug Jones, Lance Henriksen, and Patrick Gorman. The plot follows a group of real estate developers who travel to a remote Pacific island to scout the location for a new resort, only to stumble upon a hidden World War II bunker that unleashes terrifying supernatural forces.

Gehenna: Where Death Lives was acquired by Uncork'd Entertainment in 2018 and officially released on May 4, 2018. An early screening took place at Saipan Regal Cinemas on June 30, 2018. The film garnered mixed reviews from critics, with praise for its practical effects and performances, but criticism for its pacing and reliance on familiar horror tropes.

== Plot ==
Paulina, a real estate developer, meets up with architect Tyler, cameraman Dave, property salesman Alan, and their local guide Pepe on the Pacific island of Saipan to scout a location for a new luxury resort, and Pepe confirms that the locals believe the property is a cursed burial ground. Paulina and Tyler are interested in the property, but they are suspicious of Alan's sleazy sales tactics. While scouting the location using a drone, the group catches sight of some unknown people and confront them as trespassers. The two strangers are locals praying, and they warn Pepe against exploring the area, but Pepe is not superstitious and disregards them. When the locals leave, the group discovers an abandoned World War II bunker on the property and Dave picks up a bojobo doll, a type of ritual effigy, that the locals dropped. Worried that the bunker could be a source of liability for the new resort, Paulina convinces the group to enter the bunker and explore it.

Upon entering the bunker, they find human remains that don't seem to belong in a WWII-era bunker. Exploring further, they encounter an emaciated old man, whom Alan accidentally kills. They subsequently are knocked out by a high-pitched noise and wake up to find that the bunker door is shut and unable to be opened. The decide to explore the bunker further in an attempt to find another exit, but the group's psychology begins to falter. Alan blames Paulina for convincing them to enter the bunker in the first place, and Pepe sees a vision of his dead mother and begins to mutilate himself.

As they venture deeper into the bunker, they find a radio and Tyler attempts to contact someone outside the bunker. However, he only hears a looping message intended for Japanese soldiers after the surrender of Japan in WWII. They encounter a Japanese WWII soldier who first threatens the group before killing himself with his pistol. Rattled, the group explores further and finds a cave area that clearly predates the building of the bunker. There are images of bojobo dolls on the walls, and Dave recounts a myth about the island that he read before arriving: They bojobo dolls come in pairs and represent a bride and groom. The caves attached to the bunker were previously used by the native people in a ritual to curse a 17th-century Spanish colonialist who had enslaved them, and he supposedly lives on to this day. Dave then sees a ghostly vision and dislocates his ankle in his haste to escape it. Paulina and Tyler help him back to a bed in the bunker, while Alan continues to complain. Dave suggests that the bojobo doll he brought into the bunker looked like the bride in the images, and that perhaps reuniting the bride and groom dolls would break the curse.

Tyler translates the soldier's diary and the group learns that one of the Japanese soldiers stationed in the bunker uncovered the ritual burial ground, after which the soldiers start acting irrationally and eventually kill each other until only one remains. It is implied by the journal that the remaining soldier takes his own life only to be revived again. They find the male bojobo doll in the dead soldier's pocket. Pepe, who had been absent for some times, reappears and threatens Alan, who continues to talk down to him. The group separates once again, and Tyler and Paulina find that Dave has been killed. Paulina has a ghostly vision as well and reveals to Tyler that she had a young son who drowned and that she blames herself for his death. Paulina and Tyler find the cave alluded to in the soldier's diary and are confronted by Pepe, who seems to have gone insane. He insists that "only one can live," but Paulina shows him the bojobo doll bride and convinces him that reuniting the doll with the groom will break the curse. Pepe reveals that he had taken the groom doll and begins to reunite them.

However, they are all interrupted by Alan, who reveals that he was the one who killed Dave and that he does not intend to wait to be killed by the rest of them. He attacks Pepe, and Pepe cuts the head off the bojobo doll in retaliation. Alan kills Pepe and mortally injures Tyler, but Paulina manages to get away and pry the pistol away from the dead soldier. As she is about to shoot Alan, Tyler uses the last of his strength to stop her, reiterating that "only one can live." Paulina indicates that she understands what Tyler means and gives him the pistol, and he shoots her before dying from his own wounds. As Tyler dies, Alan's wounds are healed and he rejoices that he has survived. However, he finally realizes what the others figured out before him: the last one alive must stay alive as a witness to the torments endured in that place, and it is revealed that the emaciated old man that he killed when they first entered the bunker was actually himself after trapped there for 70 years.

== Cast ==
- Doug Jones as Creepy Old Man
- Lance Henriksen as Morgan
- Patrick Gorman as Don Rodrigogiobb
- Simon Phillips as Alan
- Sean Sprawling as Pepe
- Eva Swan as Paulina
- Katherine Wallace as Claire
- Justin Gordon as Tyler
- Matthew Edward Hegstrom as Dave

== Production ==
Gehenna: Where Death Lives is Hiroshi Katagiri's debut feature as a director. Filming was completed in Los Angeles, California, as well as on the islands of Saipan and Tinian in 2015. The film employed traditional special-effects makeup, created by Spectral Motion in Glendale, California, to achieve its gory scenes.

This was the first feature film to be significantly shot in Saipan and Tinian, marking an important milestone in the cinema of Northern Mariana Islands. While the production and director were not local, much of the crew, extras, and some actors were from Saipan. The Commonwealth of Northern Mariana Islands supported the film’s production, and local citizens also contributed through crowdfunding efforts. The film's significance was recognized locally as it was not only shot in Saipan but also set there, with hopes that it would inspire more Marianas-bred filmmakers to pursue ambitious projects.

== Release ==
Gehenna: Where Death Lives premiered at the Shriekfest Film Festival in Los Angeles in October 2016. The film made its United Kingdom debut at the Bram Stoker International Film Festival on October 27, 2016, and premiered in Australia at A Night of Horror Film Festival on November 24, 2016. It also screened at various other festivals, including the New York City International Film Festival and the Philadelphia Asian American Film Festival in 2016. In 2017, it was shown at the Indie Horror Film Festival in Chicago.

In 2018, the film was acquired by Uncork'd Entertainment, and a limited theatrical and VOD release in the United States was announced for May 4, 2018. Additionally, an early screening was held at Saipan's Regal Cinemas starting on June 30, 2018.

== Reception ==
On the review aggregator Rotten Tomatoes, Gehenna: Where Death Lives holds an approval rating of 50%, based on 10 reviews, with an average rating of 5.3/10.

Noel Murray from the Los Angeles Times noted, "Gehenna: Where Death Lives features impressive gore effects, but the plot's an uninspired hodgepodge of dozens of other 'haunted structure' pictures, set at a plodding pace, in a gray, dim location. It peaks in its first five minutes. The remaining 100 go nowhere, slowly." Dennis Harvey from Variety commented that while the film's premise showed promise and the performances were competent, it was ultimately undermined by its underdeveloped script and lack of genuine scares.

Norman Gidney from Film Threat acknowledged the film's flaws, stating, "Not perfect, not by a longshot," but added that it is "too much fun not to see through to the end."

== Awards ==
In 2017, Gehenna: Where Death Lives won Best Cinematography for a Feature Film at the Indie Horror Film Festival in Chicago.

== See also ==
- Gehenna – a historic valley surrounding Ancient Jerusalem, sometimes associated with a concept of divine punishment
- Japanese horror
