= Hush (2016 feature film) =

2016 film by Mike Flanagan

- Promotional poster
- Directed by: Mike Flanagan
- Written by: Mike Flanagan; Kate Siegel
- Produced by: Trevor Macy; Jason Blum
- Starring: John Gallagher Jr.; Michael Trucco; Kate Siegel
- Cinematography: James Kniest
- Edited by: Mike Flanagan
- Music by: The Newton Brothers
- Production companies: Blumhouse Productions; Intrepid Pictures
- Distributed by: Netflix (Note: The film was not marketed as a Netflix original nor did it feature the Netflix logo.); Shout! Studios (Note: Shout! Studios acquired the rights after the license with netflix expired.)
- Release dates: March 12, 2016 (SXSW); April 8, 2016 (United States)
- Running time: 81 minutes
- Country: United States
- Languages: English; American Sign Language
- Budget: $1 million

Hush is a 2016 American slasher film directed and edited by Mike Flanagan, and starring Kate Siegel, who also co-wrote the film with Flanagan. The film co-stars John Gallagher Jr., Michael Trucco, Samantha Sloyan, and Emilia "Emma" Graves. It was jointly produced by Trevor Macy through Intrepid Pictures and Jason Blum through Blumhouse Productions.

The film had its world premiere at South by Southwest on March 12, 2016, and was released by Netflix on April 8, 2016. It received positive reviews from critics, who praised the performances and atmosphere.

Midnight Mass, a miniseries based on the Hush story within a story of the same name, also created and directed by Flanagan, and starring Siegel, was released on Netflix on September 24, 2021.

== Plot ==
Horror author Maddie Young lost the ability to hear and speak after contracting bacterial meningitis at age thirteen, causing hearing loss and temporary vocal cord paresis, which became permanent after an unsuccessful surgery.

Following the critical acclaim of her novel Midnight Mass, Maddie has left New York City for a solitary life in the woods with her cat, Bitch, though she is struggling to write her next book. Her neighbor, Sarah, visits to return a copy of her novel, and they discuss Maddie's isolation and Sarah's desire to learn more sign language. Later that night, a masked killer with a crossbow chases a bloodied Sarah to Maddie's house, but her cries for help go unnoticed, and the killer stabs Sarah to death.

The killer quickly deduces that Maddie is deaf and decides to make her his next victim. Sneaking inside, he steals her cell phone while she is on a video call with her sister, Max, and takes pictures of Maddie, sending them to her, which she receives on her computer. The killer reveals himself outside, stalking Maddie as she frantically locks her doors, before he cuts the house's power and punctures her car tires. Maddie writes "won't tell, didn't see face, boyfriend coming home" on the glass door with lipstick, but the killer responds by taking off his mask. Upon learning she can read lips, he threatens to take his time terrorizing her before eventually breaking in.

The killer taunts Maddie by using Sarah's corpse to knock on a window, but is distracted when Maddie triggers her car alarm. She opens a window and tries to retrieve Sarah's phone, but the killer returns, and Maddie wounds him in the arm with a hammer before locking herself back inside. She soon slips outside and tries to run, but is forced back inside after narrowly avoiding the killer's crossbow bolts. Attempting to escape through a second-story window, Maddie is shot in the leg, but manages to knock the killer off the roof and steal his crossbow before retreating inside.

While a badly wounded Maddie struggles to cock the crossbow, Sarah's boyfriend, John, arrives looking for Sarah. The killer poses as a police officer responding to a call, but John grows suspicious when the killer drops Sarah's earring, which he took as a trophy. Before John can subdue the killer with a rock, Maddie inadvertently distracts him by banging on the window, and the killer fatally stabs him in the neck. A dying John puts the killer in a chokehold but dies before the killer loses consciousness. Maddie realizes that if she flees, be caught; and if she hides, she will bleed to death; her only chance for survival is to fight.

Outside, the killer prepares to kill Maddie’s cat, but she shoots him in the shoulder with the crossbow. While racing inside, Maddie drops the last bolt and reaches for it, but the killer slams the sliding door on her wrist and stamps on her hand, then allows her to pull her mangled hand inside and lock the door. When he threatens to enter the house, Maddie writes "do it, coward" on the door with her own blood. As the killer bashes the door with a tire iron, Maddie uses her laptop to type up a description of the killer and a message to her family, before locking herself in the bathroom, armed with a knife.

Failing to break through the door, the killer crashes through the bathroom skylight behind Maddie, unnoticed until he breathes on her neck. She stabs him in the knee, and he pursues her to the kitchen, where she blinds him with insecticide and disorients him with her visual smoke alarm. He begins strangling her, but she impales him in the neck with a corkscrew, finally killing him. Retrieving her phone from his corpse, Maddie dials 9-1-1 and flees to her porch steps, where she pets her cat, smiling as the police arrive.

== Cast ==
- Kate Siegel as Madison "Maddie" Young
- John Gallagher Jr. as The Man
- Michael Trucco as John Stanley
- Samantha Sloyan as Sarah Greene
- Emma Graves as Max, Maddie's sister

== Production ==
Nothing was known about the project until September 2015, when its existence was revealed at a buyers' screening at the 2015 Toronto International Film Festival. It was disclosed that Mike Flanagan had directed the film, and co-wrote it with his wife Kate Siegel, who also stars in it.

Flanagan said that he made the main character a deaf mute because he wanted to direct a film "without dialogue". The possibility of making the film entirely silent was briefly considered, but was soon abandoned when Flanagan had decided that building tension with this limitation would be "impossible". Flanagan also noted that the target audience would not have been used to silent films and, as such, would "seek out every kind of audio stimulus anywhere else in the environment" or simply choose to not watch the film.

The script itself consisted largely of scene directions, which Flanagan and Siegel developed by acting out in their own house. The fact that so much of the script was based around Flanagan and Siegel's house proved problematic for filming, as when they went to shoot the film in Alabama, they could not find a house similar enough to theirs and had to significantly alter the film's script. Flanagan also found challenges in the single location and had to plan the cinematography to keep the film interesting to the audience, especially given the mute nature of the protagonist; to this end, Flanagan used a Steadicam to follow Siegel's every move, along with a boom mic and a spotter, to make the movement more "dynamic". The resulting audio for these scenes could not be used and had to be redone in post, with Flanagan noting that the audio initially "sounded like a herd of elephants."

To represent Maddie's world, various ambient sounds were used, such as the sound of ultrasound machines. Flanagan did not want to use pure silence for these scenes, as he still felt it would make viewers even more aware of their surroundings and take them out of the experience. As a result of the aforementioned camera set in, Siegel had to ADR her own breath into the final film. The film's soundtrack was composed by The Newton Brothers.

== Release ==
Hush had its world premiere at South by Southwest on March 12, 2016. Prior to the premiere, Netflix acquired worldwide distribution rights to the film, which it released on April 8.

On April 7, 2023, the film was removed from Netflix as the company's distribution license expired. This was confirmed by Flanagan, stating "they only licensed it for 7 years", while also stating intentions of a physical release in the future. Shout! Studios released the film on video on demand on August 27, 2024, prior to its limited theatrical release on October 16, 2024.

=== Home media release ===
A 4K Ultra HD Blu-ray collector's edition physical release from Shout! Studios was released on November 26, 2024, which included a never-before-seen, black-and-white "Shush Cut".

== Reception ==
On the review aggregation website Rotten Tomatoes, the film has an approval rating of 91% based on 45 reviews, with an average rating of 7.5/10. The site's critics consensus reads, "Hush navigates the bloody waters of home invasion thrillers and incisive slashers for a contemporary horror puree." At Metacritic, the film has a weighted average score of 67 out of 100, based on reviews from seven critics, indicating "generally favorable" reviews.

Benjamin Lee of The Guardian said that Hush "offers ingenious suspense" and awarded it four out of five stars. Geoff Burkshire of Variety, though criticizing the film's third act, called it "one of the more inspired concoctions to emerge from the busy Blumhouse horror-thriller assembly line in recent years." Michael Gingold of Fangoria gave the film 3.5/4 stars, calling it "a good old-fashioned truly scary movie". Jasef Wisener of TVOvermind gave the film a 4.7/5, noting that "Thanks to the performances from its two leads, Hush succeeds in almost every aspect and delivers one of the best horror films in modern history." Richard Newby of the website Audiences Everywhere called the film "a modern slasher movie classic that's not to be missed."

Stephen King wrote about the film on April 20, 2016, saying, "How good is Hush? Up there with Halloween and, even more, Wait Until Dark. White knuckle time. On Netflix." Filmmaker William Friedkin, director of The Exorcist, also commented on the film, saying "HUSH is a great horror film...on Netflix. Terrifying."

Deaf actress Millicent Simmonds of A Quiet Place, in an interview with IndieWire said that she wasn't fond of the inaccuracies regarding deaf culture, saying: "I saw it with some of my deaf friends, and we were pretty highly critical of it just because it didn't feel real."

== Miniseries ==
On September 24, 2021, Midnight Mass, a miniseries based on the Hush story within a story of the same name (the internationally acclaimed novel by deaf-mute horror author protagonist Madison "Maddie" Young), also created and directed by Flanagan and starring Siegel, was released on Netflix.

== See also ==
- List of films featuring home invasions
- List of films featuring the deaf and hard of hearing
- List of films featuring psychopaths and sociopaths
