= Midnight Mass (miniseries) =

American television miniseries

- Promotional poster
- Genre: Drama; Supernatural horror
- Created by: Mike Flanagan
- Written by: Mike Flanagan; James Flanagan; Elan Gale; Dani Parker; Jeff Howard
- Directed by: Mike Flanagan
- Starring: Kate Siegel; Zach Gilford; Kristin Lehman; Samantha Sloyan; Igby Rigney; Rahul Kohli; Annarah Cymone; Annabeth Gish; Alex Essoe; Rahul Abburi; Matt Biedel; Michael Trucco; Crystal Balint; Louis Oliver; Henry Thomas; Hamish Linklater
- Theme music composer: The Newton Brothers
- Country of origin: United States
- Original language: English
- No. of episodes: 7

Production
- Executive producers: Mike Flanagan; Trevor Macy; Jeff Howard
- Producer: Kathy Gilroy
- Production locations: Steveston, British Columbia, Canada
- Cinematography: Michael Fimognari
- Editor: Mike Flanagan
- Running time: 60–71 minutes
- Production company: Intrepid Pictures

Original release
- Network: Netflix
- Release: September 24, 2021

Midnight Mass is an American gothic supernatural horror television miniseries created and directed by Mike Flanagan for Netflix. It stars Zach Gilford, Kate Siegel, Hamish Linklater, Samantha Sloyan, Rahul Kohli, Kristin Lehman and Henry Thomas. Set in the isolated fishing community of Crockett Island, the series follows a former resident who returns home after serving a prison sentence and a mysterious priest whose arrival coincides with a series of apparently miraculous events.

Flanagan developed Midnight Mass over more than a decade, initially conceiving it as a novel before adapting it into a screenplay and subsequently a television series. Drawing on his Catholic upbringing and experiences with alcoholism and sobriety, he incorporated themes of religious faith, fanaticism, guilt and redemption into the narrative. The project was commissioned by Netflix in July 2019 as part of Flanagan's overall television production agreement with the company. Filming took place in British Columbia between August and December 2020, following a delay caused by the COVID-19 pandemic.

Midnight Mass was released on Netflix on September 24, 2021, and received positive reviews, with praise for Flanagan's directing, performances of the cast (particularly Linklater) and its new take on the vampire genre, but some criticism for its writing and pacing.

== Premise ==
A young man returns to his isolated hometown on Crockett Island, hoping to rebuild his life after serving four years in prison for killing someone in a drunk-driving incident. He arrives at the same time as a mysterious, charismatic priest who begins to revitalise the town's flagging faith. However, the community's divisions are soon exacerbated by the priest's deeds while mysterious events befall the small town.

== Cast and characters ==
=== Main ===
- Zach Gilford as Riley Flynn, a former venture capitalist who returns to his hometown of Crockett Island after spending four years in prison for killing a woman in a drunk driving crash.
- Kate Siegel as Erin Greene, Riley's childhood sweetheart, now a schoolteacher on Crockett Island and expecting a child. Siegel previously starred in Flanagan's 2016 film Hush (also co-written by Siegel) as Madison "Maddie" Young, presented within the film as the author of Midnight Mass.
- Hamish Linklater, in a dual role, as Father Paul Hill, the enigmatic new priest at St. Patrick's Church, who arrives to temporarily replace the aging Monsignor Pruitt (also played by Linklater).
- Kristin Lehman as Annie Flynn, Riley's devout, forgiving mother.
- Samantha Sloyan as Bev Keane, a zealous, overbearing, and influential member of the church.
- Igby Rigney as Warren Flynn, Riley's teenage brother who serves as an altar boy at the church.
- Rahul Kohli as Sheriff Hassan, Crockett Island's Muslim sheriff, generally accepted by the island's predominantly Catholic population but viewed skeptically by many.
- Annarah Cymone as Leeza Scarborough, the mayor's devout daughter who uses a wheelchair following an injury.
- Annabeth Gish as Dr. Sarah Gunning, the town's local doctor, and Erin's close friend.
- Alex Essoe as Mildred Gunning, Sarah's aging mother who has dementia.
- Rahul Abburi as Ali, the sheriff's son and friend of Warren and Ooker.
- Matt Biedel as Sturge, the island handyman.
- Michael Trucco as Wade Scarborough, the mayor of Crockett Island.
- Crystal Balint as Dolly Scarborough, Wade's wife, and Leeza's mother.
- Louis Oliver as Ooker, Warren and Ali's friend who also serves as an altar boy at the church.
- Henry Thomas as Ed Flynn, Riley's father who works as a fisherman and is reluctant to welcome his son home.

=== Recurring ===
- Robert Longstreet as Joe Collie, the town drunk
- Carla Gugino as Judge (voice only)
- Quinton Boisclair as The Angel
- Ebony Booth as Tara-Beth, the teenage girl killed by Riley in a drunk driving crash
- John C. McDonald as Bowl, a local drug dealer

== Episodes ==
The title of each episode is a book in the Bible. Each episode contains a scene referring to the Biblical book.

| No. | Title | Directed by | Written by | Original release date |
|---|---|---|---|---|
| 1 | "Book I: Genesis" | Mike Flanagan | Mike Flanagan | September 24, 2021 |
After serving four years in prison for a drunk driving crash that killed a young woman, Riley Flynn returns to Crockett Island, a fishing village devastated by an oil spill. Having lost his faith in prison, Riley struggles to reconnect with the island’s devout Catholic community, including his parents Annie and Ed, his brother Warren, his pregnant former girlfriend Erin Greene, and parishioner Bev Keane. A young priest, Father Paul Hill, arrives as a temporary replacement for Monsignor Pruitt, who is reportedly on pilgrimage in the Holy Land. While out at night with friends Ooker and Ali, Warren sees strange movement on a remote island inhabited by feral cats, one of which is later mauled by an unseen entity. The next night, Riley sees a figure resembling Pruitt walking along the beach during a storm before it disappears. The following morning, hundreds of dead cats are found along the shore.
| 2 | "Book II: Psalms" | Mike Flanagan | Mike Flanagan and James Flanagan and Elan Gale | September 24, 2021 |
The townspeople cannot determine the cause of death for cats found along the beach. Bev spreads rodenticide 1080 around the church to deter predators. Father Paul meets Leeza Scarborough, the mayor’s wheelchair-using daughter, who was paralyzed after local alcoholic Joe Collie accidentally shot her. During the annual Ash Wednesday "Crock Pot Luck" Festival, Joe’s dog dies after eating food from the ground, leading Joe to suspect Bev, whom he resents for persuading the townspeople to accept an oil company settlement that benefited the church. Erin, now a teacher, later sees a mysterious figure outside her home. Riley attends an AA meeting with Father Paul and condemns God over the fatal car crash he caused. That night, drug dealer Bowl is attacked by an unseen assailant. During Mass, Father Paul orders Leeza to stand and receive the Eucharist, and she miraculously walks.
| 3 | "Book III: Proverbs" | Mike Flanagan | Mike Flanagan and James Flanagan | September 24, 2021 |
Crockett Island experiences a religious revival after Leeza suddenly regains the use of her legs, which residents regard as a miracle. Leeza visits Joe and tells him she has forgiven him for causing the injury that left her paralyzed, prompting Joe to attend an AA meeting with Riley and Paul. Sheriff Hassan becomes concerned when he learns his son Ali has been studying the Bible, and later unsuccessfully argues against Bev distributing Bibles at the public school. Paul suddenly collapses, coughing blood before dying in front of Bev and the Scarboroughs, only to revive moments later. In a flashback, Paul reveals that Monsignor Pruitt became lost in a sandstorm near Jerusalem and took refuge in an ancient ruin, where he was attacked by a winged humanoid creature that drank his blood before feeding him its own. Pruitt awoke restored to his youth, revealing that Father Paul is actually a rejuvenated Pruitt. Convinced the creature is an Angel, Pruitt believes its blood is a divine gift he intends to share with the island.
| 4 | "Book IV: Lamentations" | Mike Flanagan | Mike Flanagan and Dani Parker | September 24, 2021 |
Doctor Sarah Gunning discovers that Erin's fetus has vanished without explanation and concludes that she has miscarried. Distressed, Erin travels to the mainland for a second opinion, but another doctor finds no evidence that she was ever pregnant. After his resurrection, Paul learns that sunlight burns him, and Bev realizes he is Monsignor Pruitt. Unable to appear publicly during the day, Paul administers the Eucharist privately to Sarah’s elderly mother Mildred, who suffers from dementia but recognizes him as Pruitt. Joe later visits Paul and discovers him drinking the Angel’s blood, which Paul has been mixing with sacramental wine and distributing to the congregation. Overcome by bloodlust, Paul kills Joe and drinks his blood. The next morning, Bev, Mayor Scarborough, and handyman Sturge find the body, but Bev conceals the killing, believing Paul’s resurrection signals the Second Coming of Christ. During an AA meeting, Paul falsely tells Riley that Joe is visiting his sister. Knowing Joe’s sister is dead, Riley returns to confront Paul and discovers the Angel filling a decanter with its blood before attacking him.
| 5 | "Book V: Gospel" | Mike Flanagan | Mike Flanagan and James Flanagan | September 24, 2021 |
Concerned by Riley’s disappearance, Erin files a missing persons report with Hassan, who suspects Riley may have relapsed or committed suicide. During Good Friday mass, Paul delivers a sermon urging the congregation to prepare for war as soldiers in God’s army, disturbing Mildred, whose health and memory have greatly improved through Paul’s visits. Later that night, Riley asks Erin to accompany him offshore in a rowboat. Once far from the island, Riley explains that after the Angel attacked him, he recovered under Paul’s care. Paul then revealed that he is Monsignor Pruitt and that he has been mixing the Angel’s blood into communion wine to heal the island’s residents. Horrified, Riley left farewell letters for his family and Pruitt before visiting Erin. He explains that he brought her onto the water to protect others from himself and confesses his love for her. At sunrise, Riley bursts into flames and burns to ashes in front of Erin, who screams in horror.
| 6 | "Book VI: Acts of the Apostles" | Mike Flanagan | Mike Flanagan and James Flanagan and Jeff Howard | September 24, 2021 |
Erin returns to the island, where Sarah shows her Mildred’s restored youth and that her blood burns in sunlight, concluding that Paul has been causing apparent miracles through the communion wine and that Erin’s consumption of it caused her pregnancy to disappear. Erin tells Hassan, who refuses to investigate the church, fearing further stigma. Erin, Sarah, and Mildred try to flee but discover the ferries have been sent away. That night, Sturge cuts power to the town as Paul reveals he is Monsignor Pruitt and presents the Angel to the stunned congregation. Explaining they have consumed the Angel’s blood, Pruitt urges them to drink poison and be reborn. Several parishioners comply, including Leeza’s parents, Sturge, Ooker, and Ali. Mildred shoots Pruitt before the Angel attacks her. The resurrected churchgoers then attack those who refused the poison. Erin shoots Bev, and she, Hassan, Leeza, Sarah, Warren, and Annie escape. Many slain residents, including Ed, also resurrect, while the revived Bev and Sturge unleash the undead congregation on the town.
| 7 | "Book VII: Revelation" | Mike Flanagan | Mike Flanagan | September 24, 2021 |
Mildred reunites with Pruitt, with Sarah revealed to be their daughter; Pruitt admits he brought the Angel to the island to prevent Mildred's death and reunite their family. As the turned churchgoers massacre the town, survivors flee Erin’s burning house after Annie distracts Bev and Sturge by slitting her own throat. Erin, Sarah, and Hassan burn the boats to trap the turned on the island, while Bev orders all remaining buildings destroyed except the church and rec center, where the turned intend to shelter themselves. Horrified by the violence, Pruitt denounces Bev, who calls him a false prophet. During the survivors’ attempt to destroy the final shelters, Sturge shoots Sarah, Bev mortally wounds Hassan, and the Angel attacks Erin. Erin slices the Angel’s wings while it feeds on her, preventing its escape. Pruitt fails to turn Sarah before burning the church, after which he and Mildred take Sarah’s body to a bridge she was fond of as a little girl. Ali destroys the rec center. With no shelter from sunrise, the remaining townspeople gather to die while singing "Nearer, My God, to Thee". Leeza and Warren escape by canoe, and Leeza realizes she can no longer feel her legs, implying the Angel and its miracles are gone.

== Production ==
=== Development and writing ===
Series creator Mike Flanagan described Midnight Mass as a passion project that drew on his upbringing in the Catholic Church, his experiences with alcoholism and sobriety, and his eventual atheism. He began developing the story as a novel, with surviving drafts dating to 2010, before adapting it into a feature film screenplay in 2012. A revised screenplay followed in 2013, but Flanagan concluded that the story required a longer format. In 2014, he developed the project as a television series with producer Trevor Macy and screenwriter Jeff Howard. The series was unsuccessfully pitched to several production companies, including Netflix. Flanagan used Tangier, Virginia, as a geographical inspiration for the fictional Crockett Island.

Flanagan and Kate Siegel subsequently incorporated Midnight Mass as a story within a story in their 2016 film Hush, in which Siegel's character, Maddie Young, is the author of a novel bearing the title. The text displayed on Maddie's computer was taken from Flanagan's earlier manuscript, while dialogue in the film refers to Riley Flynn and Erin Greene, characters who later appeared in the television series. A prop copy of the fictional novel also appeared as an Easter egg in Flanagan's 2017 film Gerald's Game. Flanagan described these references as a means of maintaining his connection to the project during its prolonged development.

Flanagan's Catholic upbringing informed the series' treatment of religion. He had served as an altar boy on Governors Island, New York, and attended Catholic schools in Maryland. His subsequent study of other religions and religious criticism contributed to his interest in religious fundamentalism and the relationship between faith and moral certainty. Flanagan also drew on his experiences with alcohol dependency when writing Riley Flynn, particularly his fear of causing harm to others while intoxicated. He continued revising the material after becoming sober, incorporating his changing perspectives on addiction, guilt and forgiveness.

Following the success of The Haunting of Hill House (2018), Flanagan and Macy entered an overall television production agreement with Netflix. On July 1, 2019, Netflix announced that Midnight Mass would be a seven-episode miniseries, with Flanagan serving as its writer, director and executive producer.

=== Casting ===
In February 2020, Zach Gilford, Kate Siegel and Hamish Linklater were announced in leading roles.

For his audition, Linklater received the first three scripts and nine pages of monologues, followed by another five pages the night before. He attributed his ability to memorise the dialogue to the rhythm of Flanagan's writing. Linklater also cited Raúl Juliá's performance in the film Romero (1989) as an influence on his portrayal of Father Paul.

=== Filming ===
Principal photography was originally scheduled to commence in March 2020, but was delayed by the COVID-19 pandemic. Midnight Mass entered production on August 17, 2020, in Vancouver, British Columbia and concluded on December 15, 2020.

Production built the town set at Garry Point Park, a seaside public area outside Vancouver, which stood in for Crockett Island. Flanagan and executive producer Trevor Macy had considered filming on an existing island, but rejected the option because of the logistical difficulties of transporting and accommodating the crew. Production designer Steve Arnold instead oversaw the construction of the fictional community, with waterfront houses built at Garry Point Park in Richmond and the town square and main street constructed on farmland in Langley.

The exterior sets remained standing during the pandemic-related shutdown. Siegel recalled that the buildings had weathered naturally during the intervening months, with vegetation growing around them. The production also reduced the number of background performers to comply with COVID-19 restrictions. According to Siegel, the island's population was reduced to 170 and an oil-spill storyline was introduced to explain its declining population.

Cinematographer Michael Fimognari used Arri Alexa LF cameras with Atlas Orion anamorphic lenses. The camera system was selected for its mobility and low-light capabilities. The church interior was filmed on a sound stage and lit using candles supplemented by adjustable overhead lighting. Fimognari also introduced a system of identifying camera teams by the colours red, green and blue rather than the conventional A, B and C designations, which he said was intended to reduce distinctions of seniority between crews.

The church sequence in the sixth episode required 103 camera setups and six days of filming. Approximately 100 background performers were present, including 40 stunt performers, all of whom were required to undergo rapid COVID-19 testing before entering the set. Flanagan described the sequence as more technically demanding than the extended tracking shots in the sixth episode of The Haunting of Hill House, owing to the number of performers and the confined filming space. The church sequence also required approximately 200 candles to be lit repeatedly between setups. Flanagan stated that the practical lighting and the number of performers complicated the filming process.

=== Sound design ===
Jonathan Wales and Trevor Gates served as co-supervising sound editors, with Wales also working as re-recording mixer. Flanagan provided the sound department with a map of Crockett Island to establish the relationships between its locations. The team used the map to determine where environmental sounds, including waves, seabirds and boats, would be audible. Ocean noise and seabirds were largely excluded from the church and school, while background activity elsewhere on the island was reduced to reflect the community's declining population.

The storm sequence in the first episode underwent several revisions. Gates and Wales initially used low-frequency thunder effects before replacing them with sharper thunderclaps intended to suggest nearby lightning. Additional sounds of objects rattling inside the houses were incorporated to convey the force of the storm. The sound team also removed the noise of wind chimes visible in several exterior scenes after Flanagan determined that they conflicted with the intended atmosphere.

Gates developed the vocal effects of the winged creature using sounds produced by its performer, Quinton Boisclair. Boisclair's recordings were supplemented with a female voice and a small number of library effects. The sound department also developed two recurring effects associated with the characters' supernatural transformation, representing their hunger and altered vision. Gates and Wales sought to distinguish these effects from conventional science-fiction and horror sound design.

=== Music ===
Midnight Mass

Soundtrack album
- Released: September 24, 2021
- Genre: Soundtrack
- Length: 1:34:57
- Label: Maisie Music Publishing

The soundtrack for Midnight Mass was released in September 2021. The music for the series was scored by The Newton Brothers, Andy Grush and Taylor Newton Stewart, who have worked with series creator Mike Flanagan on each of his projects since his 2013 film Oculus. The soundtrack features reimagined Christian hymns, along with original pieces from The Newton Brothers.

Midnight Mass track listing
| No. | Title | Length |
|---|---|---|
| 1. | "Abide with Me" | 2:41 |
| 2. | "Hail the Day that Sees Him Rise" | 3:12 |
| 3. | "Holy Holy Holy" | 2:25 |
| 4. | "Lead Kindly Light" | 2:31 |
| 5. | "Come, Darkness" | 4:14 |
| 6. | "Were You There" | 2:56 |
| 7. | "O Sons and Daughters" | 3:35 |
| 8. | "Holy God, We Praise Thy Name" | 6:02 |
| 9. | "Nearer, My God, to Thee" | 4:47 |
| 10. | "The Power of Faith" | 3:09 |
| 11. | "Mortuus Feles" | 3:58 |
| 12. | "Mercy" | 4:41 |
| 13. | "Aftermath" | 2:41 |
| 14. | "Dignity" | 6:02 |
| 15. | "The Sea" | 1:56 |
| 16. | "Angel of God" | 2:09 |
| 17. | "Lead Kindly Light (Instrumental)" | 2:50 |
| 18. | "Faith & Family Blood" | 6:01 |
| 19. | "Prayer" | 3:31 |
| 20. | "Act of Contrition" | 2:45 |
| 21. | "Hurt" | 3:02 |
| 22. | "12th Century Revenants" | 2:09 |
| 23. | "Communion" | 1:31 |
| 24. | "Nearer My God To Thee (Instrumental)" | 8:02 |
| 25. | "Body of Christ" | 2:42 |
| 26. | "Were You There (Instrumental)" | 5:24 |
| Total length: | | 94:57 |

== Release ==
Midnight Mass was released on Netflix on September 24, 2021.

== Reception ==
=== Critical response ===
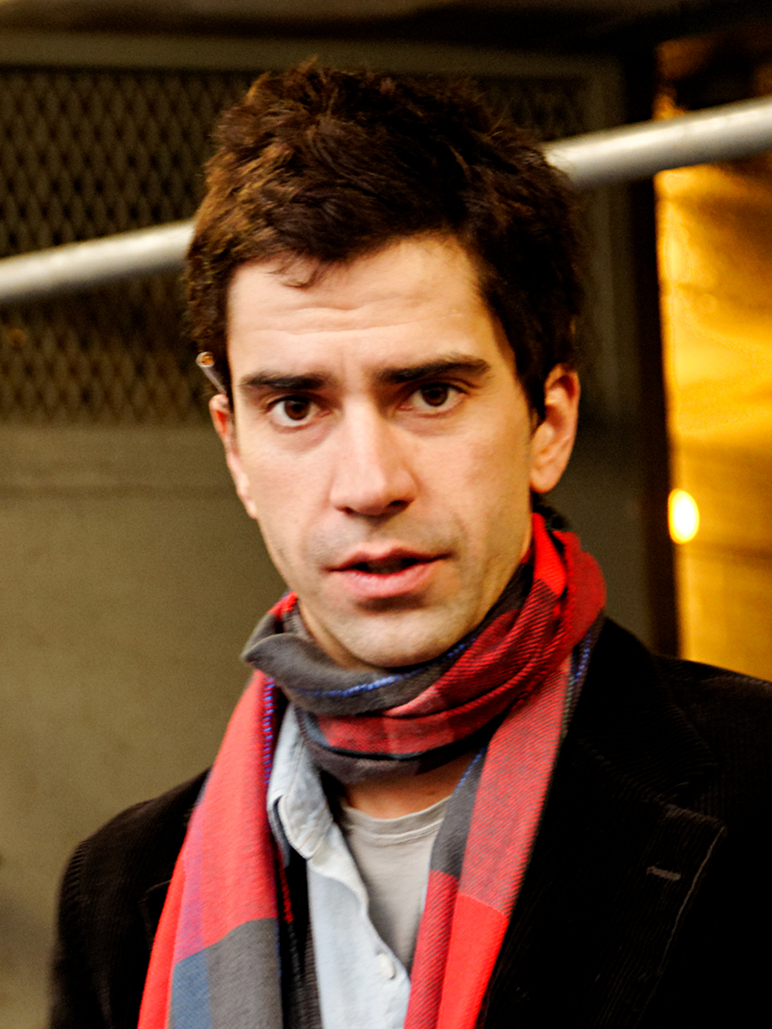
Hamish Linklater received widespread acclaim for his performance as Father Paul.

The review aggregator website Rotten Tomatoes reports an 87% approval rating with an average rating of 8.10/10, based on 102 critic reviews. The website's critics consensus reads, "An ambitious meditation on grief and faith that is as gorgeous as it is unsettling, Midnight Mass's slow boil is a triumph of terror that will leave viewers shaking – and thinking – long after the credits roll." Metacritic gave the series a weighted average score of 75 out of 100 based on 23 reviews, indicating "generally favorable reviews".

Critics praised Flanagan's direction, the performances, and the series' unique approach to the vampire genre. Kristen Baldwin of Entertainment Weekly gave the series an "A−" grade and wrote that it "isn't perfect, but it is a keenly affecting, beautifully acted reflection on death, faith, guilt, addiction, and the power of free will." Judy Berman of Time gave it a very positive review, calling it Flanagan's best series yet and praised the performances of Zach Gilford, Kate Siegel and especially Hamish Linklater. Jen Chaney of Vulture called Linklater's performance "phenomenal" and believed he elevated the series to "moments of greatness," writing: "he speaks as if he's discovering his way through every sentence and wants you to come with him." David Fear of Rolling Stone wrote, "the three-layers-deep work that Linklater is doing over these seven episodes is extraordinary." Fear also praised Flanagan's directing, stating that "It’s the way that [he] carefully sets everything into place in anticipation of a bigger-picture nightmare that makes the payoffs so satisfying." Richard Roeper of the Chicago Sun-Times called the series "the best Stephen King story Stephen King never wrote" and stated, "even though this is an original work from Flanagan, it feels like a high-level adaptation of a particularly haunting King novel."

The series' writing and pace drew more mixed responses, with frequent criticism directed at the monologue-heavy script. Jack Seale of The Guardian gave the series three out of five stars, praising Flanagan's filmmaking, but criticizing the series for its "bloated dialogue" stating that "When the end comes at last, there is a lot of fire and viscera, but no rapture." Brian Tallerico of RogerEbert.com gave the series two and a half stars out of four, further criticizing the dialogue and religious themes, stating that the series "can be a little exhausting in its preachiness." Tallerico felt that the series' emphasis on philosophical examination came at the expense of its horror elements, writing, "most of the lengthy conversations are well-scripted, engaging enough in their dialogue, but they also drain a lot of the momentum from the piece." He also criticized the series' visual effects as "generally inferior to both Haunting projects," stating "Flanagan has always worked better with shadows in the dark than when he has to reveal them."

The show's creators insisted that the series was not anti-religious or anti-Catholic. A Progressive Catholic priest who reviewed the show said its depiction of how religion treats sin was accurate, but the series showed a poor understanding of how religion treats afterlife, while Premier Christianity states that the show "contains some of the fairest treatments of Christian characters I’ve seen on screen" and "also has a prophetic message to the Church."

Kohli's character has received praise from Muslim viewers, many citing him as a rare example of positive, accurate Muslim representation. The scene where he argues about religious texts in public schools has also been praised as an accurate reading of a Muslim perspective on Jesus. Kohli said in Michael Rosenbaum's podcast Inside of You that the role was his most difficult. Kohli is "not Muslim, not American, not a dad, and not forty," and thus had a hard time in the role.

=== Accolades ===
| Year | Award | Category | Nominee(s) | Result | Ref. |
|---|---|---|---|---|---|
| 2022 | Bram Stoker Award | Superior Achievement in a Screenplay | Mike Flanagan, James Flanagan, and Jeff Howard for "Book VI: Acts of the Apostles" | Won | |
| 2022 | Critics' Choice Television Awards | Best Limited Series | Midnight Mass | Nominated | |
| 2022 | Critics' Choice Television Awards | Best Actor in a Limited Series or Movie Made for Television | Hamish Linklater | Nominated | |
| 2022 | Critics' Choice Television Awards | Best Supporting Actor in a Limited Series or Movie Made for Television | Zach Gilford | Nominated | |
| 2022 | Critics' Choice Super Awards | Best Horror Series | Midnight Mass | Nominated | |
| 2022 | Critics' Choice Super Awards | Best Actor in a Horror Series | Hamish Linklater | Won | |
| 2022 | Critics' Choice Super Awards | Best Actor in a Horror Series | Zach Gilford | Nominated | |
| 2022 | Critics' Choice Super Awards | Best Actress in a Horror Series | Samantha Sloyan | Nominated | |
| 2022 | Critics' Choice Super Awards | Best Actress in a Horror Series | Kate Siegel | Nominated | |
| 2022 | Critics' Choice Super Awards | Best Villain in a Series | Samantha Sloyan | Nominated | |
| 2022 | Hollywood Critics Association TV Awards | Best Streaming Limited or Anthology Series | Midnight Mass | Nominated | |
| 2022 | Hollywood Critics Association TV Awards | Best Actor in a Streaming Limited or Anthology Series or Movie | Hamish Linklater | Nominated | |
| 2022 | Saturn Awards | Best Limited Event Television Series | Midnight Mass | Nominated | |
| 2022 | Saturn Awards | Best Actress in a Streaming Television Series | Kate Siegel | Nominated | |
| 2022 | Television Critics Association Awards | Outstanding Achievement in Movies, Miniseries and Specials | Midnight Mass | Nominated | |
| 2022 | Writers Guild of America Awards | Original Long Form | Mike Flanagan, James Flanagan, Elan Gale, Dani Parker, and Jeff Howard | Nominated | |
