= Intrepid Pictures =

US independent production company

Intrepid Pictures, LLC
- Current logo as of 2012.
- Type: Private
- Industry: Motion picture
- Founded: 2004; 22 years ago
- Founder: Trevor Macy; Marc D. Evans
- Headquarters: Los Angeles, California, United States
- Area served: Worldwide
- Key people: Trevor Macy (CEO)
- Website: www.intrepidpictures.com

Intrepid Pictures is an American independent film and television production company dedicated to producing elevated commercial content for global mainstream audiences. It was founded in 2004 by Trevor Macy and Marc D. Evans, and is currently run by Trevor Macy. The company is based in Los Angeles, California.

== History ==
Intrepid Pictures was founded in 2004 by founders and co-CEOs Trevor Macy and Marc D. Evans.

Before Intrepid was created, both Evans and Macy worked at Revolution Studios and Propaganda Films respectively. Evans spent 4 years at Revolution Studios as CFO from 2000 to 2004, while Macy spent 2 years as the COO of Propaganda Films and independently produced Auto Focus.

A year after forming the company, Rogue signed a deal with Intrepid to co-produce, co-finance and distribute films in partnership with Universal Studios, Rogue's then-parent company, for five years. The company then debuted with Waist Deep in 2006, which earned $21.35 million worldwide. In February 2011, Melinda Nishioka was hired as a Coordinator, and as of September 2016 became the Vice President of Development.

The group broke through with The Strangers. In May 2012 FilmDistrict acquired the film rights to what would become Oculus. Soon after, the film released on April 11, 2013, to commercial and critical success, earning $44 million over a $5 million budget and received positive reviews. In June 2015, Los Angeles Media Fund co-funded The Bye Bye Man, which originated from a script by Jonathan Penner with STX Entertainment acquiring the film in December. Intrepid's most notable recent releases are the critically acclaimed films Hush, Before I Wake, Ouija: Origin of Evil and Gerald's Game, all with Mike Flanagan, a frequent Intrepid collaborator and partner from 2019-2024.

In January 2018, Intrepid and Macy announced their involvement in Doctor Sleep, the sequel to the iconic horror film The Shining, for Warner Bros. Pictures. In February 2019, it was announced that Flanagan had formally joined Intrepid as a partner, and that Intrepid had signed an overall deal with Netflix to generate television series. As part of that overall deal, Netflix ordered the original series Midnight Mass in July 2019. On October 6, 2021, it was announced that Flanagan would create an eight episode limited series titled The Fall of the House of Usher for Netflix that will be based on the works of Edgar Allan Poe. Flanagan and Michael Fimognari will each direct four episodes and executive produce the series. On December 1, 2022, it was announced that the company had signed a TV deal with Amazon Studios. Under the deal, Macy and Flanagan will develop and produce projects under Intrepid for Amazon Prime Video, thus ending their deal with Netflix. Feature film productions were not part of the deal. In 2024, Flanagan split from Intrepid and formed his own independent production company Red Room Pictures.

== Filmography ==
Release date	Title	Director	Distributor
June 23, 2006	Waist Deep	Vondie Curtis-Hall	Rogue Pictures
November 10, 2006	The Return	Asif Kapadia	Rogue Pictures
January 19, 2007	The Hitcher	Dave Meyers	Rogue Pictures
August 29, 2007	Balls of Fury	Robert Ben Garant	Rogue Pictures
March 14, 2008	Doomsday	Neil Marshall	Rogue Pictures
May 30, 2008	The Strangers	Bryan Bertino	Rogue Pictures
February 10, 2012	Safe House	Daniel Espinosa	Universal Pictures
April 27, 2012	The Raven	James McTeigue	Relativity Media
September 7, 2012	The Cold Light of Day	Mabrouk El Mechri	Summit Entertainment
April 9, 2013	Crush	Sonny Mallhi	FilmNation Entertainment
April 11, 2014	Oculus	Mike Flanagan	Relativity Media
April 8, 2016	Hush	Mike Flanagan	Netflix
January 13, 2017	The Bye Bye Man	Stacy Title	STX Entertainment
June 2, 2017	Dobaara: See Your Evil	Prawaal Raman	B4U Motion Pictures
September 29, 2017	Gerald's Game	Mike Flanagan	Netflix
January 5, 2018	Before I Wake	Mike Flanagan	Netflix
March 9, 2018	The Strangers: Prey at Night	Johannes Roberts	Aviron Pictures
October 18, 2019	Eli	Ciarán Foy	Netflix
November 8, 2019	Doctor Sleep	Mike Flanagan	Warner Bros. Pictures
July 20, 2024	Shelby Oaks	Chris Stuckmann	Neon
September 6, 2024	The Life of Chuck	Mike Flanagan	Neon

== Television ==
Year	Series	Creator(s)	Network
2018	The Haunting of Hill House	Mike Flanagan	Netflix
2020	The Haunting of Bly Manor	Mike Flanagan	Netflix
2021	Midnight Mass	Mike Flanagan	Netflix
2022	The Midnight Club	Mike Flanagan; Leah Fong	Netflix
2023	The Fall of the House of Usher	Mike Flanagan	Netflix

== Upcoming films ==
Date	Title	Director	Distributor	Notes
March 12, 2027	The Exorcist: Martyrs	Mike Flanagan	Universal Pictures	
TBA	The Season of Passage	Mike Flanagan	Universal Pictures	
