= Justin Gordon =

American actor

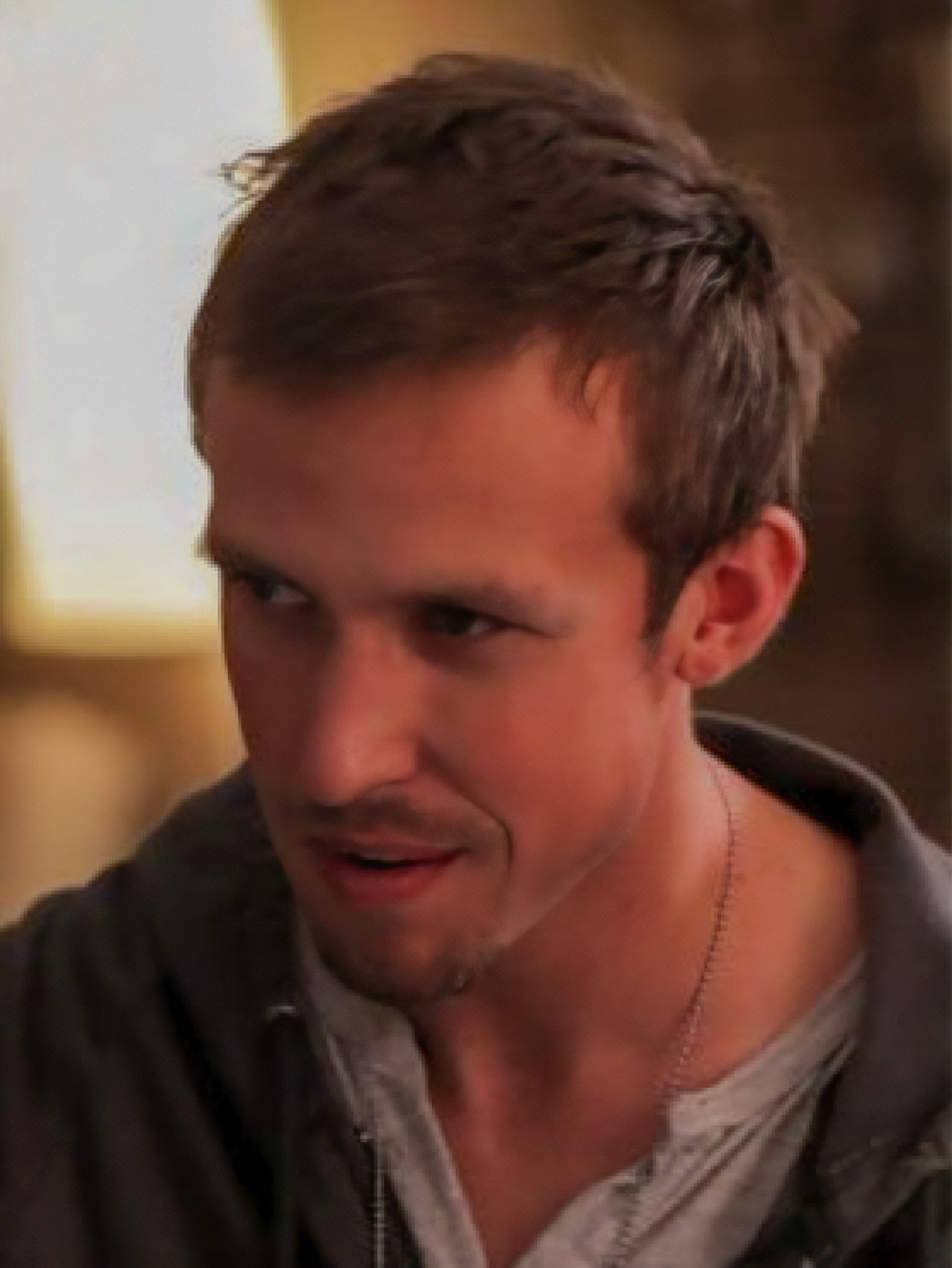
- Justin Gordon as Detective Lonergan in Absentia
- Born: Bakersfield, California, United States
- Occupations: Actor, film producer, writer, painter

Justin Gordon is an American actor, stage director, film producer, and painter. He is known for his work on Mike Flanagan's films Absentia, Oculus, and Before I Wake.

== Life and career ==
Born in Bakersfield, California and raised in the small Sierra Nevada town of Posey, Gordon fostered a creative spirit due to the natural solitude and beauty of his hometown surroundings. After attending a summer acting and directing program at Shakespeare's Globe Theatre in London, UK, Gordon went on to obtain his M.F.A. from the University of Illinois at Urbana-Champaign, while working in regional theatre around the United States. He then moved to Los Angeles in 2009. His first major film role was as the by-the-book Detective Lonergan in Mike Flanagan's horror film Absentia, produced by FallBack Plan Productions (where Gordon was a founding partner). Since then, he has appeared in two other of Mike Flanagan's films: Oculus (serving also as an Associate Producer) and Before I Wake.

== Painting ==
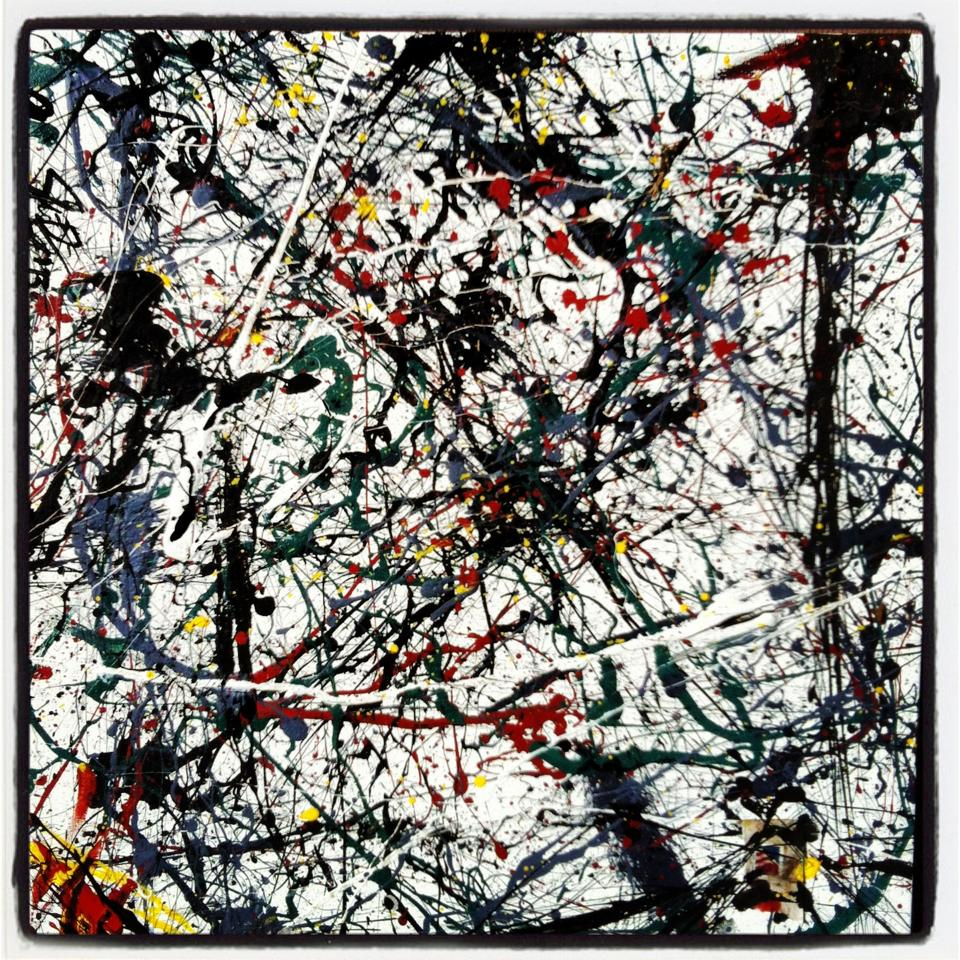
"Sunday No. 3," by Justin Gordon. Acrylic, sand and postage stamp on canvas.

In addition to his work in film and theatre, Gordon is an avid painter, working in the style known as action painting, made prominent by Jackson Pollock and Franz Kline.

== Filmography ==
Year	Title	Role	Notes
2011	Absentia	Detective Lonergan	Producer
2012	The Unbreakable Sword	Lt. Alex Corringfield	
2012	Unlucky Lucky	Jim	Short
2014	Oculus	Mark (Supervisor)	Associate Producer
2015	Before I Wake	Dr. Tennant	
2015	The Hunting of Lost Characters	John John	Short
2015	Fun Sized Horror: Volume Two	Evan	Segment: Pinned
2017	Age of the Living Dead (Series)	Phillip	Six Episodes
2018	Gehenna: Where Death Lives	Tyler	
2023	The Fearway	Michael	
