= The Exorcist: Martyrs =

Upcoming film by Mike Flanagan

- Teaser poster
- Directed by: Mike Flanagan
- Written by: Mike Flanagan
- Based on: Characters by William Peter Blatty
- Produced by: Jason Blum; David Robinson; Mike Flanagan
- Starring: Scarlett Johansson; Chiwetel Ejiofor; Diane Lane; Jacobi Jupe; Sasha Calle; Scoot McNairy; Gil Bellows; Laurence Fishburne; John Leguizamo
- Cinematography: Michael Fimognari
- Edited by: Mike Flanagan
- Music by: The Newton Brothers
- Production companies: Blumhouse Atomic; Morgan Creek Entertainment
- Distributed by: Universal Pictures
- Release date: March 12, 2027
- Country: United States
- Language: English

The Exorcist: Martyrs is an upcoming American supernatural horror film written and directed by Mike Flanagan. It is the seventh installment in The Exorcist franchise. Jason Blum serves as a producer through his Blumhouse Atomic banner, David Robinson through his Morgan Creek Entertainment studio. It stars Scarlett Johansson, Chiwetel Ejiofor, Diane Lane, Jacobi Jupe, Sasha Calle, Scoot McNairy, Gil Bellows, Laurence Fishburne, and John Leguizamo.

Prior to the project's announcement, a sequel was planned for The Exorcist: Believer (2023) entitled The Exorcist: Deceiver, with David Gordon Green originally set to return as director, but he left the project following the critical failure of Believer. In May 2024, Deceiver and its sequel were officially canceled when the new film was announced, with Flanagan writing, producing, and directing the film. After two release delays, casting took place throughout November 2025 to March 2026, when principal photography began in New York City and completed in June.

The Exorcist: Martyrs is scheduled to be released in the United States by Universal Pictures on March 12, 2027.

== Synopsis ==
Thirteen years ago, New York City detective Julie Miller (Scarlett Johansson) ended the terror reign of satanic serial killer Father Sunday. The case made her a hero, and she has thrown herself into her work ever since. Now a new killer scrawls her name in an altar boy’s blood on the walls of a church crypt, dragging her back into the darkness she believed she had buried with him. Aided by former prison chaplain Father William (Chiwetel Ejiofor), who heard Father Sunday’s final confession, and sharp rookie detective Gina Restrepo (Sasha Calle), Detective Miller will discover a filament linking a lineage of serial killers, from H.H. Holmes to the Zodiac, that could corrupt everything, and everyone, she loves with an evil that goes well beyond the mortal.

— Universal Pictures

== Cast ==
- Scarlett Johansson as Julie Miller, a homicide detective working for the NYPD
- Chiwetel Ejiofor as Father William, a prison chaplain suffering a crisis of faith
- Diane Lane as Mary Miller, Julie's mother
- Jacobi Jupe as Max Miller, Julie's son
- Sasha Calle as Gina Restrepo, a homicide detective working for the NYPD and Julie's partner
- Scoot McNairy as Clay Silver, a paroled convict
- Gil Bellows as Peter Nicks, a former acolyte of Father Sunday
- Laurence Fishburne as Father Nichol, a priest familiar with ancient rituals
- John Leguizamo as Father Sunday, an infamous satanic serial killer
- Hamish Linklater
- Carl Lumbly
- John Gallagher Jr.
- Benjamin Pajak
- Carla Gugino
- Rahul Kohli
- Robert Longstreet
- Matt Biedel
- Samantha Sloyan
- Kate Siegel

== Production ==
=== Development ===
==== Initial work as Deceiver ====
In July 2021, two sequels to The Exorcist: Believer (2023) were confirmed to be in development with the same creative team of David Gordon Green, Danny McBride, Peter Sattler, and Scott Teems on board. Two years later, Universal Pictures announced that the first sequel would be titled The Exorcist: Deceiver. After the poor reception of Believer, sources from The Hollywood Reporter claimed there would almost certainly be some degree of creative re-thinking for the next two films and that Green had expressed some doubt about his participation. In January 2024, Green stepped down from Deceiver and the film was removed from the release schedule shortly after.

==== New work as Martyrs ====
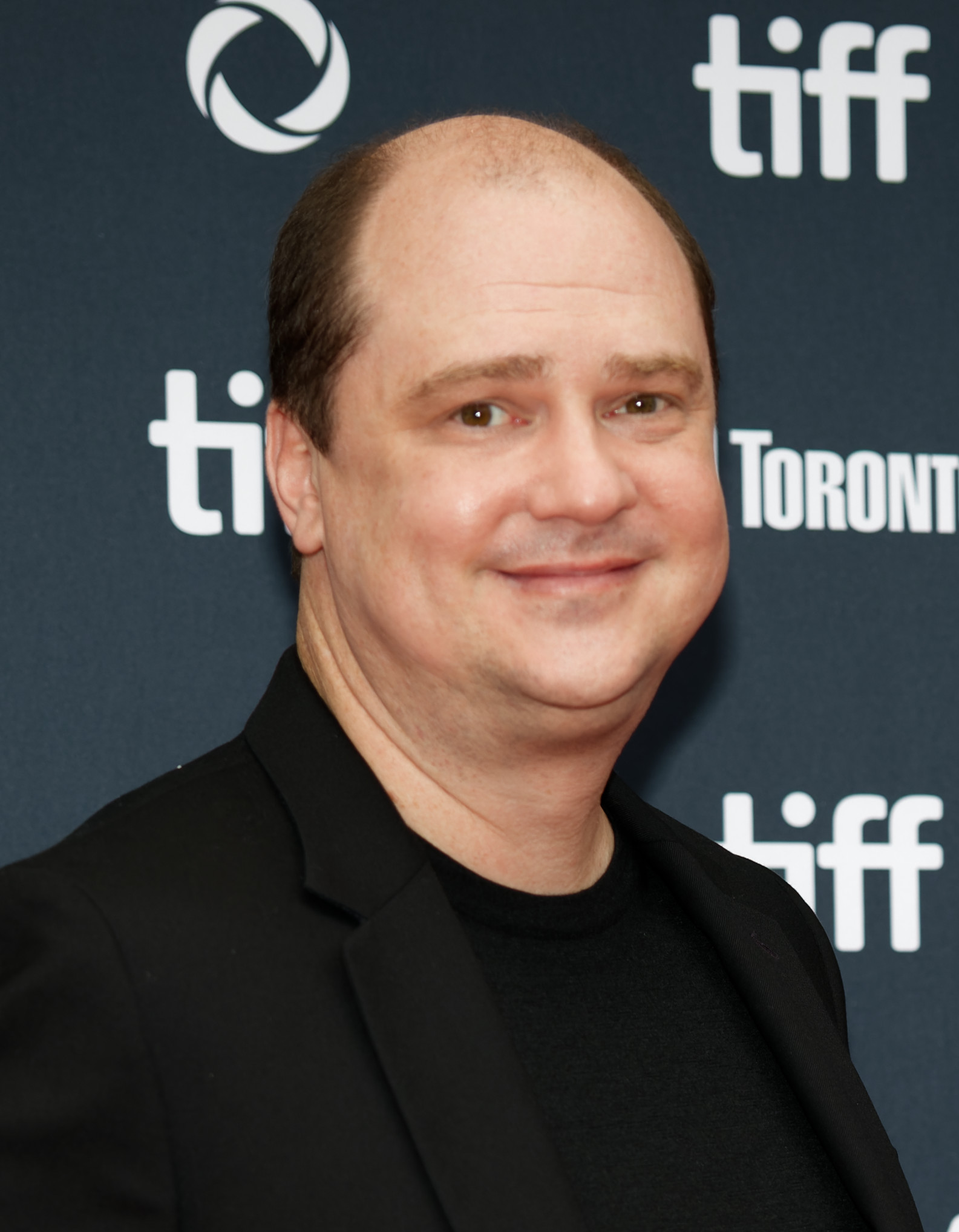
Mike Flanagan was in early talks to helm the project, until he was hired as the film's writer, producer, and director in April 2024.

In May 2024, it was announced that Mike Flanagan was in talks to write, produce and direct the next Exorcist film. Later that month, Flanagan was confirmed to be doing so for a new Exorcist film to be made as a "new radical take", with plans for Deceiver and its sequel having been scrapped following Believer's critical and commercial failure. While promoting The Life of Chuck (2024) months later, Flanagan indicated that he was only going into the franchise due to feeling there was something new he could bring to it, noting he had been "very aggressively" chasing the job due to being convinced he had something to add, seeing an opportunity to do something that had never been done within the series, and to honoring what had come before without building the new film on nostalgia. He thus saw a chance to make the scariest film he had ever made despite knowing how high the expectations would be. He indicated he was more intimidated than anyone at such prospect. As a result, Flanagan was unavailable to direct the DC Universe (DCU) film Clayface (2026) he had written for DC Studios heads James Gunn and Peter Safran, leading them to hire James Watkins to direct the film due to Flanagan's commitments to the new Exorcist film.

In June 2025, Flanagan revealed in a Tumblr post that the film was not going to begin production until after he finished work on the 2026 television adaptation of Stephen King's novel Carrie (1974) for Amazon Prime Video and that there was "no way it's coming out next March". In November 2025, Scarlett Johansson joined the film in the lead role, with Atomic Monster joining the production team. In December 2025, Jeff Sneider reported that Johansson's commitments to the film had been adjusted to accommodate the schedule of The Batman: Part II (2028), for which she had entered negotiations to discuss an undisclosed role she was "aggressively" pursuing. That same month, Jacobi Jupe joined the cast. In January 2026, Diane Lane joined the cast. The following month, Chiwetel Ejiofor and Laurence Fishburne joined the cast, with sources indicating Ejiofor would play an "ex-con turned priest" whereas Johansson would play the mother of Jupe's character. In March 2026, Sasha Calle and John Leguizamo were added to the cast, alongside Rahul Kohli, Hamish Linklater, Gil Bellows, Carl Lumbly, John Gallagher Jr., Benjamin Pajak, Carla Gugino, Robert Longstreet, Matt Biedel, Samantha Sloyan and Kate Siegel, all eleven frequent collaborators of Flanagan's. In June 2026, the official Red Room Pictures website revealed the film's title as The Exorcist: Martyrs. In October 2026, it was revealed that Scoot McNairy was a part of the cast. Flanagan also confirmed that each of the previous films in the franchise would remain canon to the film.

=== Filming ===
Principal photography began in New York City on March 13, 2026, with Michael Fimognari serving as the cinematographer. Filming concluded on June 9, 2026.

=== Music ===
On October 9, 2026, Flanagan revealed that the "Tubular Bells" musical motif synonymous with the franchise since William Friedkin's original The Exorcist film would be absent in Martyrs, a creative decision he had been fairly adamant about since the beginning of the project, as he felt that they "were surrendering some of their unique identity in favor of trying to pull something that exists in amber to the Friedkin film and it didn't feel right to reach for it". The Newton Brothers, who have scored all of Flanagan's film and television projects since Oculus (2013), will compose the film's score.

== Release ==
The film is scheduled to be released in the United States on March 12, 2027, by Universal Pictures. It was previously scheduled to be released on April 18, 2025, and March 13, 2026, before being removed from Universal's release schedule in June 2025.
