= Dobaara: See Your Evil =

2017 film written and directed by Prawaal Raman

- Theatrical release poster
- Directed by: Prawaal Raman
- Written by: Prawaal Raman
- Story by: Mike Flanagan; Jeff Howard
- Based on: Oculus by: Mike Flanagan; Jeff Howard
- Produced by: Prawaal Raman; Ishan Saksena; Vikram Khakhar; Sunil Shah
- Starring: Huma Qureshi; Saqib Saleem; Lisa Ray; Adil Hussain; Rhea Chakraborty
- Cinematography: Anuj Rakesh Dhawan
- Edited by: Hakeem Aziz; Nipun Gupta
- Music by: Songs; Arko Pravo Mukherjee; Samira Koppikar; Macks Wolf & RaOol; Background Score; Avedis Ohanian; Aditya Trivedi
- Production companies: Relativity Media; Intrepid Pictures; B4U Motion Pictures; Zahhak Films
- Release date: June 2, 2017
- Running time: 131 minutes
- Country: India
- Languages: Hindi; Sindhi

Dobaara: See Your Evil (transl. Once again: see your evil) is a 2017 Indian supernatural horror film written and directed by Prawaal Raman. It is an official adaptation of the 2013 American horror film Oculus; the original film's director and co-writer, Mike Flanagan, serves as executive producer and received story credits. The film is a B4U Motion Pictures presentation in association with Relativity Media and Zahhak Films Limited. Dobaara: See Your Evil is produced by Ishan Saksena, Prawaal Raman, Sunil Shah and Vikram Khakhar and stars Huma Qureshi and Saqib Saleem, with Adil Hussain, Lisa Ray, Abhishek Singh, and Rhea Chakraborty in crucial supporting roles. It was released worldwide on 2 June 2017.

== Premise ==
It's a story about a mirror believed to be haunted, and the contradictory views between a brother (Saqib Saleem) and sister (Huma Qureshi) dealing with the killing of their parents (Adil Hussain and Lisa Ray) eleven years ago. One day they go to a forest and they forget their home's address. At night, they go to an old home. There lived a man called Khanna (Tota Roy Chowdhury).

== Cast ==
- Huma Qureshi as Natasha Merchant

- Rysa Saujani as Young Natasha Merchant

- Saqib Saleem as Kabir Alex Merchant

- Abhishek Singh as Young Kabir Merchant

- Adil Hussain as Alex Merchant
- Lisa Ray as Lisa Merchant
- Rhea Chakraborty as Tanya
- Tota Roy Chowdhury as Mr. Khanna
- Madalina Bellariu Ion as Anna

== Soundtrack ==
Dobaara

Soundtrack album by Arko, Samira Koppikar, Macks Wolf & D. Wunder
- Genre: Feature film soundtrack
- Length: 25:23
- Language: Hindi
- Label: Zee Music Company
External audio
- Audio Jukebox on YouTube

Track listing
No.	Title	Singer(s)	Length
1.	"Kaari Kaari"	Arko & Asees Kaur	3:46
2.	"Humdard"	Jyotica Tangri	2:52
3.	"Ab Raat (Version 1)"	Arijit Singh	4:22
4.	"Malang"	Tasha Tah & D. Wunder	3:46
5.	"Ab Raat (Version 2)"	Samira Koppikar & Jonathan Rebeiro	3:19
6.	"Humdard (Alt. Version)"	Neha Pandey & Parry G	3:44
7.	"Kaari Kaari (Reprise Version)"	Arko & Payal Dev	3:34
Total length:			25:23

== Release ==
Dobaara: See Your Evil was released worldwide on 2 June 2017.

== Critical reception ==
According to the review aggregator website Rotten Tomatoes, 29% of critics have given the film a positive review based on 7 reviews. Rohit Vats of Hindustan Times gave the film a rating of 3 out of 5 saying that, "It's a faithful remake of Oculus and can make your hair stand at times. Hindi filmmakers rarely achieve such finesse in mostly predictable paranormal stories." Meena Iyer of The Times of India gave the film a rating of 2.5 saying that, "This one had the potential to be more, but it seems so stretched that you are almost willing to tear the screen yourself and attempt to silence someone." Rohit Bhatnagar of Deccan Chronicle gave the film a rating of 3 out of 5 saying that, "On the whole, Dobaara is engaging and definitely not avoidable." Prasanna Zore of Rediff gave the film a rating of 2 out of 5 and said that, "Watch Dobaara only if you have the guts to overcome, not fear, but boredom." Saibal Chatterjee of NDTV gave the film a rating of 2 out of 5 saying that, "While Dobaara: See Your Evil isn't half as messy as all those grisly ghosts-and-ghouls flicks that Bollywood foists upon us, it isn't a spine-chiller either." Bollywood Hungama gave the film a rating of 2 out of 5 saying that, "On the whole, the essence of Dobaara: See Your Evil being a psychological thriller set in the horror genre doesn't come across and is limited to a few scenes." Anupama Chopra of Film Companion gave the film a rating of 2 out of 5 and said that, "Dobaara is too silly to be scary."

== Box office ==
Dobaara: See Your Evil had a very low box office collection, taking only ₹ 10 lakhs on its first day. It ran in theatres for 60 days and had a total collection of just ₹1.36 crore.

== See also ==
- List of Bollywood horror films
