= Virgin Produced =

Virgin Group's film and television production division

Virgin Produced, LLC
- Type: Subsidiary
- Industry: Motion picture and television
- Founded: August 23, 2010, Los Angeles, California
- Founder: Jason Felts; Justin Berfield
- Defunct: October 10, 2022; 4 years ago
- Headquarters: Santa Monica, California, USA
- Key people: Jason Felts (CEO); Justin Berfield (CCO)
- Products: TV production Film production
- Parent: Virgin

Virgin Produced was the film and television production unit of Virgin Group. Based in Santa Monica, California, it was founded by former J2 Pictures producers Jason Felts and Justin Berfield. Its projects include Limitless, Movie 43 and Jobs.

== History ==
Virgin Produced was founded in 2010 in Los Angeles, California as the film and television development, packaging and production arm of Sir Richard Branson's Virgin Group. The company was formed through a partnership with Jason Felts and Justin Berfield’s existing production shingle, J2TV/J2 Pictures. Felts was the CEO of Virgin Produced until his retirement in 2022, while Berfield was the Chief Creative Officer (CCO). At the time of its launch, Variety described the founders' strategy as "aggressive," noting their intent to disrupt the traditional studio model. Unlike traditional production companies, Virgin Produced focused on a "talent-friendly" environment and leveraged "The Virgin Way", a philosophy of using the brand's airline Virgin America, mobile, and hotel assets to create a built-in marketing ecosystem for its films.

At its inception, the company entered into a multi-year joint venture with Relativity Media to co-produce and co-finance several films per year.

In April 2012, Virgin Produced launched its own digital network, the Virgin Produced Channel, with programming of lifestyle, music, travel, technology and comedy content available on Virgin America.

In 2013, Virgin Produced launched Virgin Produced India, which develops, packages, produces and distributes film and television content in Bollywood.

== Filmography ==
- Limitless – March 18, 2011
- Machine Gun Preacher – September 23, 2011
- Immortals – November 11, 2011
- The Impossible – December 21, 2012
- Movie 43 – January 25, 2013
- 21 and Over – March 1, 2013
- Jobs – August 16, 2013
- Virgin America safety dance - Fall 2013
- That Awkward Moment – January 31, 2014
- Bad Moms – July 29, 2016
- The Edge of Seventeen – November 18, 2016
- The Space Between Us – February 3, 2017
- Bixler High Private Eye – January 21, 2019
