= Fargo Theatre =

Theater and movie theater in Fargo, North Dakota, United States

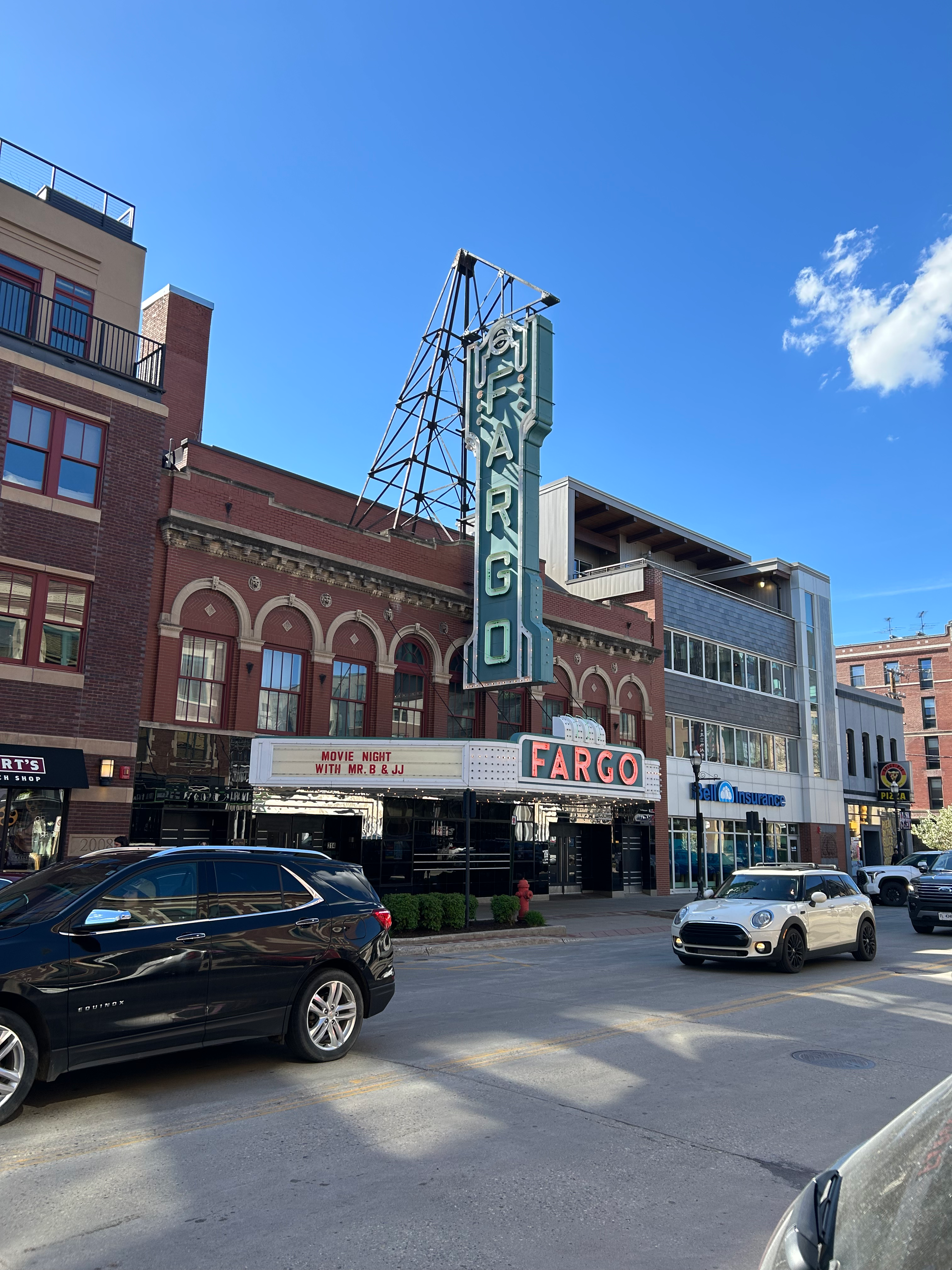
- Interactive map of Fargo Theatre
- Address: 314 Broadway; Fargo, North Dakota; United States
- Operator: Fargo Theatre Management Corporation; Jade Presents (live event booking)
- Screen: 2
- Current use: Cinema and live event venue

Construction
- Opened: March 15, 1926
- Reopened: March 20, 1999

Website
- fargotheatre.org
- Fargo Theatre Building
- U.S. National Register of Historic Places
- U.S. Historic district – Contributing property
- Location within North Dakota Location within the United States
- Coordinates: 46°52′45″N 96°47′16″W
- Area: less than one acre
- Architect: Buechner & Orth; Liebenberg and Kaplan
- Architectural style: Early Commercial, Modern Movement
- Part of: Downtown Fargo District (ID83004064)
- NRHP reference No.: 82001312

Significant dates
- Added to NRHP: October 21, 1982
- Designated CP: October 13, 1983

The Fargo Theatre is an art deco movie theater in downtown Fargo, North Dakota, United States. Construction on the building began in the fall of 1925 and the theatre opened on March 15, 1926. It was restored in 1999 to its historic appearance and now is a center for the arts in the Fargo-Moorhead metropolitan area. The Fargo Theatre is home to a 4-manual, 27-rank Wurlitzer Theatre Pipe Organ, known as the "Mighty Wurlitzer," which is owned and maintained by the Red River Theatre Organ Society, a non-profit organization and local chapter of the American Theatre Organ Society.

The building is listed on the National Register of Historic Places.

== Events ==
=== Fargo Film Festival ===
Since 2001, the Fargo Theatre has served as the main venue of the Fargo Film Festival. The festival has accepted submissions from independent filmmakers from more than 35 U.S. states and 20 countries.

Honorees of the festival have included George A. Romero, Pedro Pascal, Hugo Weaving, Janet Leigh, John Waters, Nia DaCosta, Mike Flanagan, Chloé Zhao, among others.
