= Oculus (film) =

2013 film by Mike Flanagan

- Theatrical release poster
- Directed by: Mike Flanagan
- Screenplay by: Mike Flanagan; Jeff Howard
- Based on: Oculus: Chapter 3 – The Man with the Plan by Mike Flanagan
- Produced by: Trevor Macy; Marc D. Evans
- Starring: Karen Gillan; Brenton Thwaites; Katee Sackhoff; Rory Cochrane; Annalise Basso; Garrett Ryan Ewald
- Cinematography: Michael Fimognari
- Edited by: Mike Flanagan
- Music by: The Newton Brothers
- Production companies: Intrepid Pictures; Blumhouse Productions; MICA Entertainment
- Distributed by: Relativity Media (Note: Released in collaboration with Blumhouse Productions and WWE Studios.) (United States); Sierra/Affinity (International)
- Release dates: September 8, 2013 (TIFF); April 11, 2014 (United States)
- Running time: 103 minutes
- Country: United States
- Language: English
- Budget: $5 million
- Box office: $44.4 million

Oculus is a 2013 American supernatural psychological horror film co-written, edited, and directed by Mike Flanagan. It is based on his short film Oculus: Chapter 3 – The Man with the Plan, and stars Karen Gillan and Brenton Thwaites as two young adult siblings who are convinced that an antique mirror is responsible for the death and misfortune that their family had suffered. Katee Sackhoff, Rory Cochrane, Annalise Basso, and Garrett Ryan Ewald also star.

The film had its world premiere on September 5, 2013, at the 2013 Toronto International Film Festival (TIFF) and received a wide theatrical release on April 11, 2014. It received generally positive reviews from critics, and was a box office success.

== Plot ==
The film takes place in two different times: the present and 11 years earlier. The two plot lines are told in parallel through flashbacks.

In 2002, software engineer Alan Russell moves into a new house with his wife Marie, 10-year-old son Tim, and 12-year-old daughter Kaylie. Alan purchases an antique mirror to decorate his office. Unbeknownst to them, the mirror supernaturally induces hallucinations. Marie is haunted by visions of her own body decaying, while Alan is seduced by a mysterious and ghostly woman named Marisol Chavez who has mirrors in place of eyes.

In 2013, Tim is discharged from a psychiatric hospital, having been convinced that there were no supernatural events involved in his parents' deaths. Kaylie has spent most of her young adulthood researching the history and perceived powers of the mirror. Using her position as an employee of an auction house, she obtains access to the mirror and has it transported to the family home, where she places it in a room filled with surveillance cameras and a "kill switch" — an anchor attached to the ceiling on a pivot, positioned to swing down and smash the mirror. Kaylie intends to destroy the mirror, but first wants to document its power, proving both Alan's and Tim's innocence.

Over time back in 2002, the parents become psychotic: Alan isolates himself in his office and Marie becomes withdrawn and paranoid. All of the plants in the house die, and their family dog Mason disappears after being shut in the office with the mirror. After Kaylie sees Alan with Marisol, she tells her mother and the parents fight. One night, Marie, distraught over her husband's apparent affair, tries to harm the mirror, finally becoming possessed by it, and attempts to kill her children, but Alan locks her away. When the family runs out of food, the children realize that their father is now permanently under the influence of the mirror too, so Kaylie goes to seek help from their mother and finds her chained to the wall, acting like an animal. Kaylie and Tim try going to their neighbors for help, but the neighbors disbelieve their stories. When Kaylie attempts to use the phone, she discovers that all of her phone calls are answered by the same man.

The fully possessed Alan eventually loads up a gun previously purchased by him and unchains Marie, with both parents attacking the children. Marie briefly comes to her senses, only to be shot dead by Alan. The children try to destroy the mirror but it tricks them, making them believe they are hitting the mirror when they are actually hitting the wall. Alan also experiences a moment of lucidity and kills himself by forcing Tim to pull the trigger of the gun and shoot him, causing a small crack in the corner of the mirror in the process. Before dying, he begs the children to run, but Marisol and other victims of the mirror appear as ghosts. The police arrive and take Tim into custody. Before the siblings are separated, they promise to never forget what happened with the mirror, one day reunite as adults and destroy it. As Tim is taken away and put behind bars, he sees the ghosts of his parents watching him from the house.

Back in 2013, Tim attempts to convince Kaylie that she is wrong and the siblings argue. When they notice the houseplants begin to wilt, they review the camera footage and see themselves performing actions they do not remember doing. Tim finally accepts the mirror's supernatural power and attempts to escape the house with Kaylie, only for the pair to be drawn back by the mirror's influence. Seeing a hallucination of her mother, Kaylie stabs it in the neck, only to realize that she has stabbed Michael Dumont, her fiancé and one of her fail-safes, who has come to check on her. They try to call the police, but are only able to reach the same voice who spoke to them on the phone as children.

At this point, they see their doppelgangers inside the house standing in front of the mirror. Realizing that the 9-1-1 call is not going through, they go back inside the house. Kaylie and Tim begin hallucinating by seeing younger versions of themselves, the past and the present merging into each other. They are separated and each of them relives the nightmare from their youth. Tim awakens alone in the room with the mirror, while simultaneously a younger Kaylie hallucinates her mother beckoning her from the mirror.

Tim releases the anchor, unable to see that Kaylie is standing before the mirror, and inadvertently kills her instead of destroying it. The police arrive and arrest Tim, who is hysterical, just as they did when he was younger. As both a boy and an adult, Tim claims the mirror is responsible. As he is taken away, Tim's adult incarnation sees Kaylie's ghost standing in the house with his parents.

== Cast ==
- Karen Gillan as Kaylie Russell
  - Annalise Basso as 12-year-old Kaylie Russell
- Brenton Thwaites as Tim Russell
  - Garrett Ryan Ewald as 10-year-old Tim Russell
- Katee Sackhoff as Marie Russell
- Rory Cochrane as Alan Russell
- James Lafferty as Michael Dumont
- Miguel Sandoval as Dr. Graham
- Kate Siegel as Marisol Chavez
- Justin Gordon as Mark
- Katie Parker as Phone Store Clerk
- Bob Gebert as Neighbor
- Courtney Bell as Auctioneer

== Production ==
Oculus was produced by Intrepid Pictures, MICA Entertainment, WWE Studios, and Blumhouse Productions. During the scene in which the mirror is up for auction, the auctioneer mentions that the item was "recovered from the Levesque estate", a reference to WWE wrestler Triple H, whose real name is Paul Michael Levesque.

=== Development ===
Oculus is based on director, co-writer, and editor Mike Flanagan's earlier 2005 short horror film, Oculus: Chapter 3 – The Man with the Plan. The short contained only one setting, a single actor, and a mirror. The short became highly acclaimed, and interest quickly arose regarding the adaptation of the short into a feature. Initially, studios were interested in found footage format; however, Flanagan was opposed to this and passed on such offers. Eventually, Intrepid Pictures expressed interest in producing the film "as long as you don't do it found footage".

Expanding the premise to a feature-length screenplay proved challenging, as Flanagan felt like he had "pushed the limit" of what could be done with the premise in the short. The solution Flanagan came across was to combine two storylines, past and present, intercut with one another. The idea was to "create a sense of distortion and disorientation that would be similar for the viewer as it was for Tim and Kaylie in the room." In early drafts, it was difficult to distinguish between the two timelines, until the team hit upon the idea of writing all of the scenes from the past in italics.

Inspired by the stories of H. P. Lovecraft, Flanagan chose to not explain the mirror's origins, explaining that he liked how Lovecraftian literature often seemed to be an "alien force that if you even were to try to comprehend it completely it would drive you mad." He expanded: "Evil in the world doesn't have an answer."

=== Casting ===
On July 12, 2012, it was announced that Karen Gillan had been cast in the lead role of Oculus. On September 20, 2012, Katee Sackhoff joined the cast as Marie, the mother of Gillan's character Kaylie. When writing the script for Oculus, the character of Kaylie was based on Sackhoff's work on Battlestar Galactica, and Flanagan was drawn to Gillan based on her work on Doctor Who.

Brenton Thwaites was the last of the main cast to sign on to Oculus, joining the project on October 5, 2012, after shooting for the production had already begun.

=== Filming ===
On October 27, 2012, filming concluded in Fairhope, Alabama, after three weeks.

== Release ==
Oculus was first released on September 5, 2013, at the Toronto International Film Festival and received a worldwide theatrical release on April 11, 2014.

FilmDistrict acquired U.S. distribution rights to the film at the 2012 Cannes Film Festival, but later left the project due to an agreement which said the company would have to give the film a wide release, causing the film's U.S. distribution rights to be put up for sale again. In September 2013, shortly after Oculus' premiere at Toronto, Relativity Media acquired U.S. distribution rights to the film from Blumhouse and set it for a wide release. Released in the United States on April 11, 2014, Oculus grossed $4,966,899 on its opening day. The film grossed an estimated $27.7 million at the North American box office and another $16.3 million internationally for a worldwide total of $44 million.

The film was released on DVD and Blu-ray Disc on August 5, 2014.

== Soundtrack ==
Oculus

Soundtrack album by The Newton Brothers
- Released: April 15, 2014
- Genres: Classical, stage and screen
- Length: 1:11:13
- Label: Varèse Sarabande
- Producer: Bryon Davis

The soundtrack to Oculus was composed by The Newton Brothers and released digitally on April 8, 2014, and on CD on April 15, 2014.

== Reception ==
=== Critical reception ===
On Rotten Tomatoes, a review aggregator, 75% of 157 critics have given the film a positive review, and the average rating is 6.50/10. The site's critics consensus reads, "With an emphasis on dread over gore and an ending that leaves the door wide open for sequels, Oculus could be just the first spine-tingling chapter in a new franchise for discerning horror fans." On Metacritic, the film has a weighted average score of 61 out of 100 based on 28 critics, indicating "generally favorable reviews". Audiences polled by CinemaScore gave the film an average grade of "C" on an A+ to F scale.

Richard Roeper of the Chicago Sun-Times wrote: "Oculus is one of the more elegant scary movies in recent memory." He also called it "a carefully paced, superbly photographed psychological thriller". Robert Abele of the Los Angeles Times wrote: "Less concerned with fake shocks and show-me violence than the grimly calibrated rotting of personalities, Oculus is one of the more intelligently nasty horror films in recent memory." Shock Till You Drop gave Oculus a positive review, stating that it was "smart and scary stuff". Mark Kermode of The Observer gave the film 3/5 stars, writing: "this unpretentiously efficient affair handles its dual-narrative past/present intercuts with aplomb and keeps a couple of nicely nasty tricks up its sleeve."

Film School Rejects gave a mixed review and stated that it was "well-acted, looks quite good, and manages some moments of entertainment, but as the minutes tick by it grows weaker and weaker until its final cheat designed to allow for a shocker ending." Wendy Ide of The Times gave the film 2/5 stars, writing: "It's certainly worth taking a glance at this looking glass, but horror fans may find the reflection a little familiar. Substitute a videotape for the mirror and it's basically Ring."

== Remake ==
In March 2015, Relativity Media, B4U Television Network, and Balaji Telefilms confirmed a Bollywood remake with the title Zahhak, later retitled to Dobaara: See Your Evil. This film is directed by Prawaal Raman and stars Huma Qureshi and Saqib Saleem. Flanagan served as the executive producer. The film was released on June 2, 2017.

== See also ==
- List of ghost films
