= List of awards and nominations received by Mila Kunis =

Mila Kunis awards and nominations
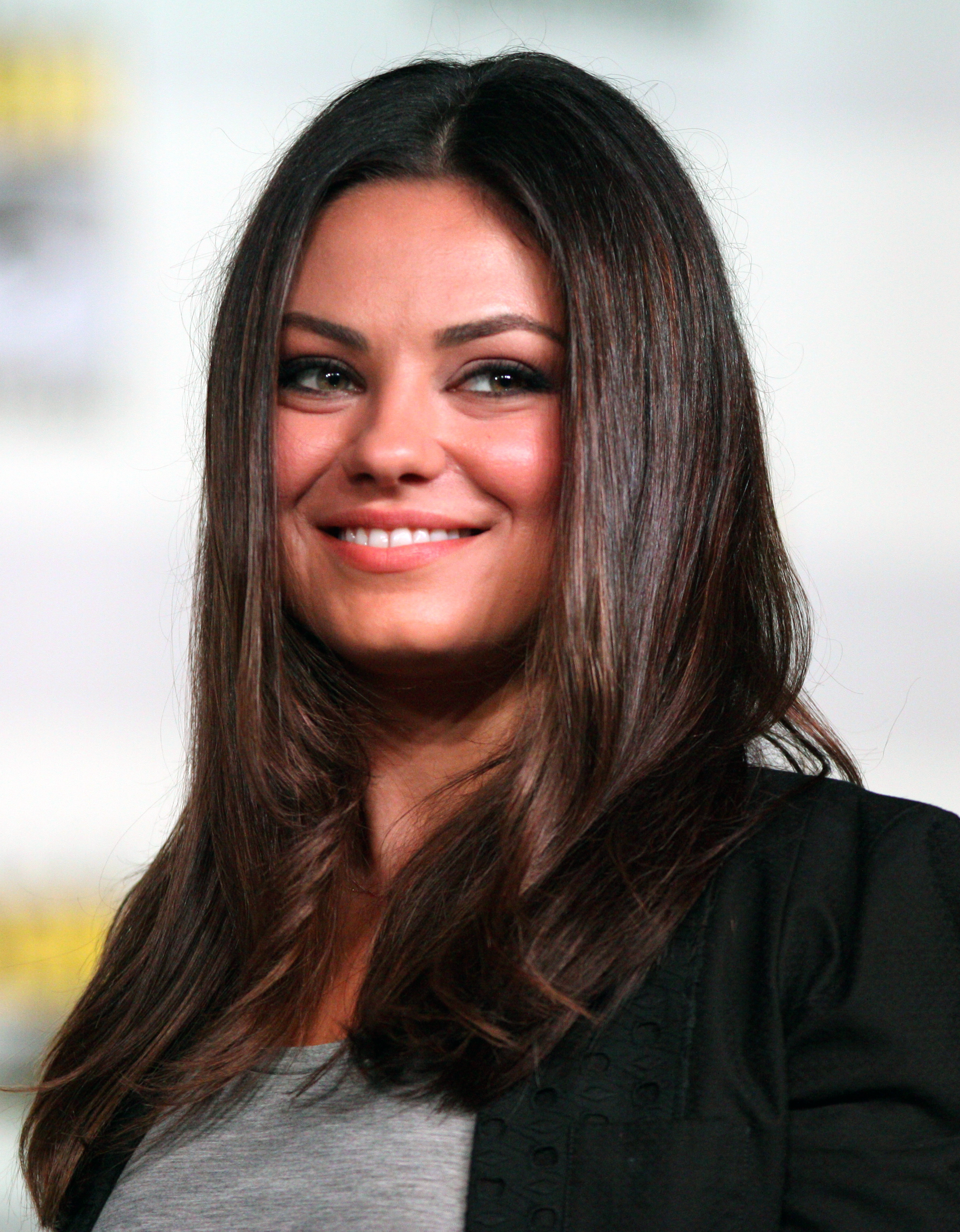
Awards and nominations
Award	Wins	Nominations
Golden Globe	0	1
Screen Actors Guild Awards	0	2

The following is a list of awards and nominations received by American actress Mila Kunis.

== Major associations ==
=== Critics' Choice Movie Awards ===
Year	Category	Nominated work	Result	Ref.
2011	Best Supporting Actress	Black Swan	Nominated	
2013	Best Actress in a Comedy	Ted	Nominated	

=== Golden Globe Awards ===
Year	Category	Nominated work	Result	Ref.
2011	Best Supporting Actress – Motion Picture	Black Swan	Nominated	

=== Screen Actors Guild Awards ===
Year	Category	Nominated work	Result	Ref.
2011	Outstanding Performance by a Female Actor in a Supporting Role	Black Swan	Nominated	
2011	Outstanding Performance by a Cast in a Motion Picture	Black Swan	Nominated	

== Other awards and nominations ==
=== Annie Awards ===
Year	Category	Nominated work	Result	Ref.
2007	Best Voice Acting in an Animated Television Production	Family Guy	Nominated	

=== Dallas–Fort Worth Film Critics Association ===
Year	Category	Nominated work	Result	Ref.
2010	Best Supporting Actress	Black Swan	Nominated	

=== Golden Raspberry Awards ===
Year	Category	Nominated work	Result	Ref.
2016	Worst Actress	Jupiter Ascending	Nominated	

=== Hasty Pudding Theatricals ===
Year	Category	Nominated work	Result	Ref.
2018	Woman of the Year	—N/a	Won	

=== Jupiter Awards ===
Year	Category	Nominated work	Result	Ref.
2017	Best International Actress	Bad Moms	Won	

=== MTV Movie and TV Awards ===
Year	Category	Nominated work	Result	Ref.
2011	Best Kiss (Note: With Natalie Portman)	Black Swan	Nominated	
2013	Best Kiss (Note: With Mark Wahlberg)	Ted	Nominated	
2013	Best Female Performance	Ted	Nominated	
2014	Best Villain	Oz the Great and Powerful	Won	

=== Oklahoma Film Critics Circle ===
Year	Category	Nominated work	Result	Ref.
2010	Best Supporting Actress	Black Swan	Won	

=== Online Film Critics Society ===
Year	Category	Nominated work	Result	Ref.
2011	Best Supporting Actress	Black Swan	Nominated	

=== People's Choice Awards ===
Year	Category	Nominated work	Result	Ref.
2012	Favorite Comedic Movie Actress	Friends with Benefits	Nominated	
2013	Favorite Movie Actress	Ted	Nominated	
2013	Favorite Comedic Movie Actress	Ted	Nominated	
2018	Comedy Movie Star	The Spy Who Dumped Me	Nominated	
2022	The Drama Movie Star	Luckiest Girl Alive	Nominated	

=== Rembrandt Awards ===
Year	Category	Nominated work	Result	Ref.
2012	Best International Actress	Friends with Benefits	Nominated	

=== Saturn Awards ===
Year	Category	Nominated work	Result	Ref.
2011	Best Supporting Actress	Black Swan	Won	

=== Scream Awards ===
Year	Category	Nominated work	Result	Ref.
2010	Best Science Fiction Actress	The Book of Eli	Nominated	
2011	Best Supporting Actress	Black Swan	Won	

=== Spike Guys' Choice Awards ===
Year	Category	Nominated work	Result	Ref.
2009	Guys Choice Awards	Hottest Mila	Won	
2011	Guys Choice Awards	Holy Grail of Hot	Won	

=== Spike Video Game Awards ===
Year	Category	Nominated work	Result	Ref.
2006	Best Supporting Female Performance	Family Guy Video Game!	Nominated	
2006	Best Cast (Note: Shared with cast)	Family Guy Video Game!	Won	

=== Teen Choice Awards ===
Year	Category	Nominated work	Result	Ref.
2000	TV – Choice Actress	That '70s Show	Nominated	
2002	TV – Choice Actress	That '70s Show	Nominated	
2004	Choice TV Actress – Comedy	That '70s Show	Nominated	
2005	Choice – TV Actress: Comedy	That '70s Show	Nominated	
2006	Choice – TV Actress: Comedy	That '70s Show	Nominated	
2008	Choice Movie Breakout Female	Forgetting Sarah Marshall	Nominated	
2009	Choice Movie Actress: Action Adventure	Max Payne	Nominated	
2010	Choice Movie Actress: Action Adventure	The Book of Eli	Nominated	
2011	Choice Movie: Liplock	Black Swan	Nominated	
2011	Choice Movie: Female Scene Stealer	Black Swan	Nominated	
2011	Choice Female Hottie	—N/a	Nominated	
2011	Choice Summer Movie Star: Female	Friends with Benefits	Nominated	
2013	Choice Movie Actress: Sci-Fi/Fantasy	Oz the Great and Powerful	Nominated	
2013	Choice Female Hottie	—N/a	Nominated	
2015	Choice Movie Actress: Sci-Fi/Fantasy	Jupiter Ascending	Nominated	

=== Venice Film Festival ===
Year	Category	Nominated work	Result	Ref.
2010	Marcello Mastroianni Award for Best Young Actress	Black Swan	Won	

=== Young Artist Award ===
Year	Category	Nominated work	Result	Ref.
1999	Best Performance in a TV Series – Young Ensemble	That '70s Show	Nominated	
2000	Best Performance in a Comedy Series: Leading Young Actress	That '70s Show	Nominated	
2001	Best Performance in a Comedy Series: Leading Young Actress	That '70s Show	Nominated	
