= Mila Kunis filmography =

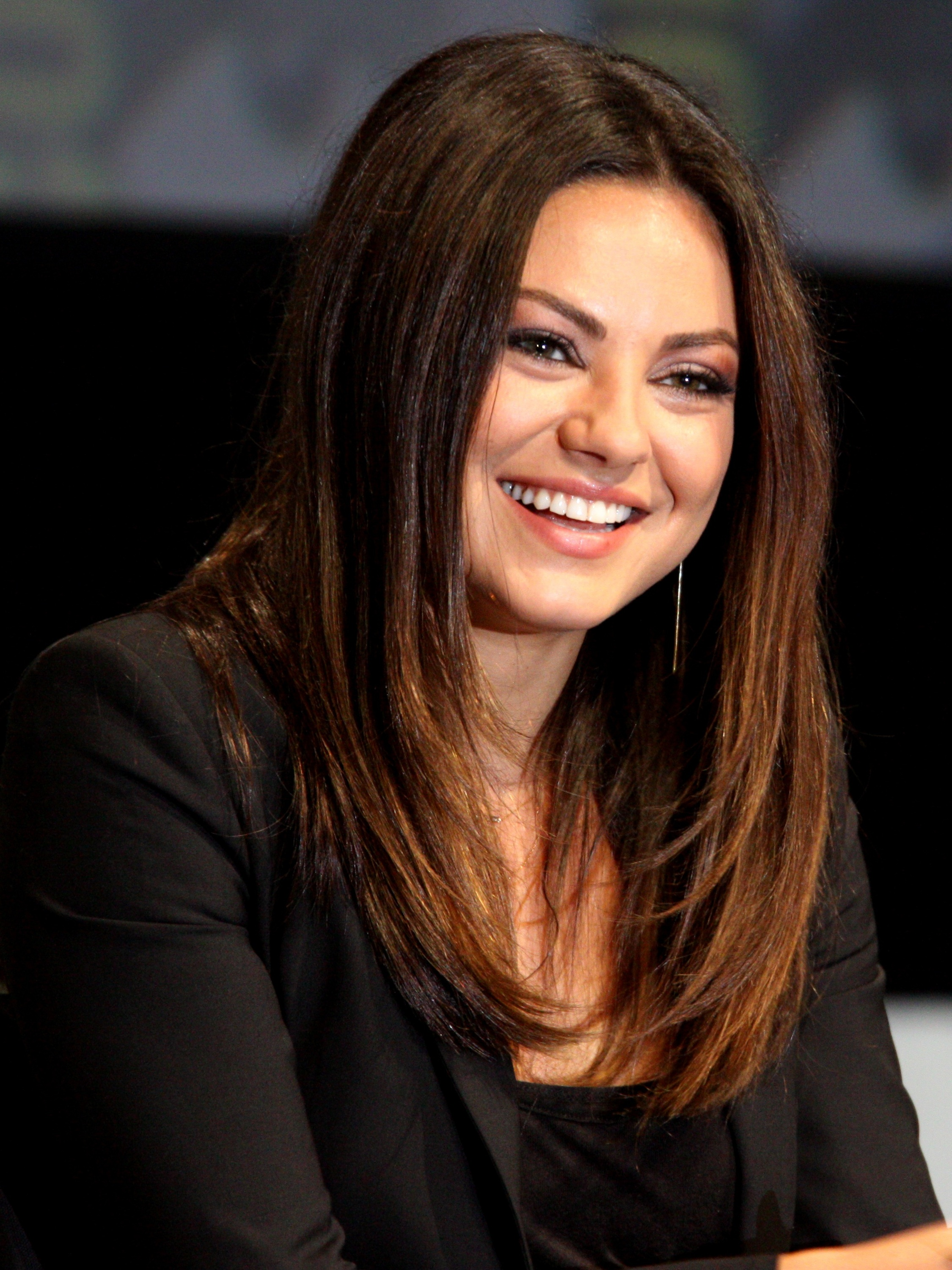
- Kunis at the 2012 San Diego Comic-Con
- Film: 38
- Television series: 27
- Music videos: 7
- Others: 5

Mila Kunis is an American actress who began her career by appearing in several television series and commercials before playing Jackie Burkhart on the television series That '70s Show. In December 1999, she began voicing Meg Griffin on the animated series Family Guy. Subsequent film roles included Mona Sax in Max Payne, Solara in The Book of Eli, Jamie in Friends with Benefits, Lori in the comedy Ted, and Theodora in Oz the Great and Powerful. Her performance as Lily in Black Swan gained her worldwide accolades, including receiving the Marcello Mastroianni Award for Best Young Actor or Actress at the 67th Venice International Film Festival, and nominations for a Golden Globe Award for Best Supporting Actress and a Screen Actors Guild Award for Outstanding Performance by a Female Actor in a Supporting Role.

== Film ==
Key
†	Denotes films that have not yet been released

Year	Title	Role	Notes
1995	Piranha	Susie Grogan	Film Debut Showtime TV Movie
1996	Santa with Muscles	Sarah	
1997	Honey, We Shrunk Ourselves	Jill	Direct-to-video
1998	Gia	Young Gia Carangi	HBO TV Movie
1998	Krippendorf's Tribe	Abbey Tournquist	
1998	Milo	Martice	Uncredited role
2001	Get Over It	Basin	
2002	American Psycho 2	Rachael Newman	Direct-to-video
2004	Tony n' Tina's Wedding	Tina Nunzio	
2005	Stewie Griffin: The Untold Story	Meg Griffin (voice)	Direct-to-video
2007	After Sex	Nikki	
2007	Moving McAllister	Michelle McAllister	
2008	Boot Camp	Sophie Bauer	
2008	Forgetting Sarah Marshall	Rachel Jansen	
2008	Max Payne	Mona Sax	
2009	Extract	Cindy	
2010	The Book of Eli	Solara	
2010	Date Night	"Whippit" Felton/Tripplehorn	
2010	Black Swan	Lily	
2011	Friends with Benefits	Jamie Rellis	
2012	Ted	Lori Collins	
2012	The Color of Time	Catherine Mauger	
2013	Oz the Great and Powerful	Theodora / The Wicked Witch of the West	
2013	Blood Ties	Natalie	
2013	Third Person	Julia Weiss	
2014	The Angriest Man in Brooklyn	Sharon Gill	Also executive producer
2014	Annie	Andrea Alvin	
2015	Jupiter Ascending	Jupiter Jones	
2015	Hell and Back	Deema (voice)	
2016	Bad Moms	Amy Mitchell	
2017	A Bad Moms Christmas	Amy Mitchell	Also executive producer
2018	The Spy Who Dumped Me	Audrey Stockman	
2019	Wonder Park	Greta (voice)	
2020	Four Good Days	Molly	
2021	Breaking News in Yuba County	Nancy Livingston	Additional cast members
2022	Luckiest Girl Alive	Tifani "Ani" Fanelli	Also producer
2024	Goodrich	Grace Goodrich	Also executive producer
2025	Wake Up Dead Man	Chief Geraldine Scott	
TBA	Nightwatching †	Lee	Post-production, also producer

== Television ==
Year	Title	Role	Notes
1994	Days of Our Lives	Young Hope Williams	1 episode
1994	Baywatch	Annie	Episode:"Aftershock"
1995	Baywatch	Bonnie	Episode: "Hot Stuff"
1995	The John Larroquette Show	Lucy Sanchez	Episode: "The Defiant One"
1995	Hudson Street	Devon	Episode: "Here's Just Looking at You, Kid"
1996	Unhappily Ever After	Chloe	Episode: "In the Stars"
1996–1997	Nick Freno: Licensed Teacher	Anna-Maria Del Bono	5 episodes
1996–1997	7th Heaven	Ashley	4 episodes
1997	Walker, Texas Ranger	Pepper	Episode: "Last Hope"
1998	Pensacola: Wings of Gold	Jessie Kerwood	Episode: "Company Town"
1998–2006	That '70s Show	Jackie Burkhart	Main role (All 8 Seasons)
1999–present	Family Guy	Meg Griffin (voice)	Main role- replaced Lacey Chabert during season two
2000	Sammy	Lola Blake (voice)	Episode: "House of Pain"
2000–2002	Get Real	Taylor Vaughn	2 unaired episodes
2002	MADtv	Daisy	Episode: "8.7"
2004	Grounded for Life	Lana	2 episodes
2005	Punk'd	Herself	Episode: "5.6"
2005–2011	Robot Chicken	Various voices	15 episodes
2009	The Cleveland Show	Meg Griffin (voice)	Episode: "Pilot"
2010	The Late Late Show with Craig Ferguson	Snooki Polizzi	Episode: "6.85"
2011	Sesame Street	Herself	Episode: "The Good Bird's Club"
2011	Good Vibes	Herself (voice)	Episode: "Red Tuxedo"
2014	Two and a Half Men	Vivian	Episode: "Lan Mao Shi Zai Wuding Shang"
2017	The Bachelorette	Herself	Episode: "Season 13, 139 overall"
2019	The Ellen DeGeneres Show	Herself (Guest host)	Episode: "April 11, 2019"
2020	Curb Your Enthusiasm	Herself	Episode: "The Spite Store"
2022	The Boys	Herself	Episode: "Herogasm"; cameo
2023	That '90s Show	Jackie Burkhart	Guest role

== Video games ==
Year	Title	Role	Notes
2006	Saints Row	Tanya Winters (voice)	
2006	Family Guy Video Game!	Meg Griffin (voice)	
2012	Family Guy: Back to the Multiverse	Meg Griffin (voice)	
2014	Family Guy: The Quest for Stuff	Meg Griffin (voice)	Mobile game
2022	Warped Kart Racers	Meg Griffin (voice)	Mobile game

== Music videos ==
Year	Title	Artist(s)
1999	"In the Street"	Cheap Trick
2000	"The Itch"	Vitamin C
2001	"Rock and Roll All Nite"	Kiss
2001	"Jaded"	Aerosmith
2003	"The End Has No End"	The Strokes
2008	"LA Girls"	Mams Taylor featuring Joel Madden
2020	"Stuck with U"	Ariana Grande and Justin Bieber
