= Chiara Aurelia =

American actress

- Born: Chiara Aurelia de Braconier d'Alphen; September 13, 2002 (age 23); Taos, New Mexico, U.S.
- Occupation: Actress
- Years active: 2014–present

Chiara Aurelia de Braconier d'Alphen (born September 13, 2002) is an American actress. She began her career as a child actress in the films Gerald's Game (2017) and Back Roads (2018). She starred as Jeanette Turner in the Freeform teen drama Cruel Summer (2021).

== Early life ==
Chiara was born in Taos, New Mexico to Frederic de Braconier d'Alphen and Claudia Kleefeld. Frederic, who died when Aurelia was three, was from Leuven, Belgium, the great nephew of Édouard Empain and a descendant of Peter Paul Rubens. Kleefeld is the daughter of singer and actor Tony Travis and author and poet Carolyn Mary Kleefeld, and the granddaughter of builder Mark Taper. Aurelia has one sibling, sister Giverny.

Aurelia grew up in Albuquerque. She began acting in school productions and local drama classes when she was five. From the age of 11, she split her time between Albuquerque and Los Angeles pursuing her career. She studied at the Lee Strasberg Institute.

== Career ==
Aurelia began her career as a child actress with small film and television roles as well as appearances in short films such as Dead Celebrity (2014). She played a younger version of Carla Gugino's character in the 2017 film adaptation of Stephen King's Gerald's Game, and portrayed Misty Altmyer in Alex Pettyfer's 2018 directorial debut Back Roads, both earned her Young Entertainer Awards.

In 2021, Aurelia began starring as Jeanette Turner in the Freeform series Cruel Summer as well as playing Rose Lord in the TNT series Tell Me Your Secrets. She also appeared in the film Fear Street Part Two: 1978. For her performance in Cruel Summer, Aurelia received HCA and Critics' Choice Award nominations. In July 2021, it was announced Aurelia had joined the cast of the Netflix film adaptation of Luckiest Girl Alive by Jessica Knoll.

She made her Broadway debut on July 15, 2025 replacing Sadie Sink as Shelby Holcomb in John Proctor Is the Villain in its final weeks.

== Filmography ==
=== Film ===
Year	Title	Role	Notes
2015	We Are Your Friends	Kayli	
2015	Big Sky	Grace	
2017	Gerald's Game	"Mouse" / young Jessie Burlingame	
2018	Back Roads	Misty Altmyer	
2021	Fear Street Part Two: 1978	Sheila Watson	
2021	Fear Street Part Three: 1666	Sheila Watson	Archive footage only
2022	Luckiest Girl Alive	Young Tiffani "Ani" Fanelli	
2026	Caity	Caity	

=== Television ===
Year	Title	Role	Notes
2014	CSI: Crime Scene Investigation	Young Karen Bishop	Episode: "Dead in his tracks"
2014	Pretty Little Liars	Addison Derringer (Young)	Episode: "How the 'A' Stole Christmas"
2015	Agent Carter	Eva	Episode: "The Iron Ceiling"
2015	Nicky, Ricky, Dicky & Dawn	Denise	Episode: "Quad-ventures in Babysitting"
2015	Foreseeable	Zoey Williams	TV movie
2016	Recovery Road	12 Year Old Ellie	Episode: "Sick as Our Secrets"
2016	Secret Summer	Hailey	TV movie
2018	The Brave	Verina Curtis	2 episodes
2021	Tell Me Your Secrets	Rose Lord	Main cast
2021	Cruel Summer	Jeanette Turner	Main cast (season 1)
2024	Hysteria!	Jordan "Jordy" Stanwyck	Main cast

== Awards and nominations ==
Year	Association	Category	Nominated work	Result	Ref.
2015	CineRockom International Film Festival	Best Young Artist	Opal	Won	
2016	Young Artist Awards	Best Performance in a TV Movie or Special – Young Actress	Secret Summer	Nominated	
2017	BaM Awards	Best Performance by a Young Actress in a Supporting Role	Gerald's Game	Won	
2018	Young Entertainer Awards	Best Supporting Young Actress – Independent or Film Festival Feature Film	Gerald's Game	Won	
2019	Young Entertainer Awards	Best Supporting Young Actress – Independent or Film Festival Feature Film	Back Roads	Won	
2019	National Film & Television Awards	Best Newcomer	Herself	Nominated	
2021	Hollywood Critics Association TV Awards	Best Actress in a Broadcast Network or Cable Series, Drama	Cruel Summer	Nominated	
2021	Women's Image Network Awards	Outstanding Actress – Drama Series	Cruel Summer	Nominated	
2022	Critics' Choice Television Awards	Best Actress in a Drama Series	Cruel Summer	Nominated	
