= Gerald's Game =

1992 suspense novel by Stephen King

- First edition
- Author: Stephen King
- Illustrator: Bill Russell
- Cover artist: Rob Wood
- Language: English
- Genre: Suspense; Psychological horror
- Publisher: Viking
- Publication date: May 1992
- Publication place: United States
- Media type: Print (hardcover)
- Pages: 332
- ISBN: 978-0-670-84650-4

Gerald's Game is a 1992 suspense novel by American writer Stephen King. The story is about a woman whose husband dies of a heart attack while she is handcuffed to a bed, and, following the subsequent realization that she is trapped with little hope of rescue, begins to let the voices inside her head take over.

The book is dedicated to King's wife Tabitha and her five sisters. Originally, the book was intended to be a companion piece to King's novel Dolores Claiborne, with the connecting theme of two women in crisis caught in the path of an eclipse, though this aspect was greatly reduced by the time the books were published. The book was adapted into a 2017 film directed by Mike Flanagan.

== Plot ==
Jessie Burlingame and her husband Gerald travel to their secluded lake house in western Maine for a romantic getaway. The titular "game" involves handcuffing Jessie to the bedposts during sex, a new practice that Jessie only pretends to enjoy, though Gerald finds it exciting. This time, however, Jessie's request to stop is ignored by Gerald who intends to rape her. Jessie lashes out, kicking Gerald. The shock causes him to have a fatal heart attack. He dies, leaving Jessie handcuffed to the bed.

At first, Jessie is horrified at her husband's death and fears the humiliation of being discovered semi-naked and handcuffed, but she realizes it is unlikely she or Gerald will be missed for several days, and she will die if she cannot escape.

While Jessie frantically considers her options, a combination of panic and thirst causes her to hallucinate voices: "The Goodwife" or "Goody Burlingame," a Puritanical version of herself that insists things will be fine and that she should wait to be rescued; "Punkin", a representation of Jessie as a 10-year-old girl; Ruth Neary, a college roommate whom Jessie abandoned after a conversation that strayed dangerously close to uncovering Jessie's childhood trauma; and Nora, Jessie's former psychologist, whom Jessie likewise abandoned when Nora questioned Jessie's relationship with her father.

Guided by these voices, Jessie realizes that Goody's advice to wait for rescue stems from a subconscious belief that she deserves to be trapped in this situation, even if it means her death. When she probes for the reason why, she is able to recall a long-repressed memory of being sexually abused by her father during a solar eclipse when she was ten. Jessie's father manipulated Jessie into believing that she was complicit, resulting in lifelong feelings of shame and guilt. She remembers an inexplicable event in the aftermath of the abuse, during which she experienced a momentary psychic connection with an unknown woman (Dolores Claiborne). The memories cause Jessie to acknowledge how unhappy and controlling her marriage to Gerald was, leading her to suspect she gave up her independence for the security of being Gerald's trophy wife.

Waking from an imaginary confrontation with all these characters to a dark bedroom, Jessie sees a tall, gaunt apparition whom she initially mistakes for the spirit of her long-dead father and whom she nicknames "Space Cowboy" (after a 1969 Steve Miller song). The figure shows her a wicker basket of jewelry mixed with human bones. Unsure if the figure is another hallucination, Jessie dismisses it, saying aloud it is "only made of moonlight", before passing out from fear. After awaking, her inner voices insist the figure is real and that it will return to harm Jessie if she does not escape by the next night.

The following morning, Jessie manages to secure a drink of water from a glass on the bedside table. Refreshed and encouraged by her own ingenuity in getting the water, she renews her efforts to escape, first by trying to break the headboard, then by trying to slip off the bed and push it to the bureau where the keys are placed. Inspired by her memory of the eclipse, in which her father warned her not to cut herself on the smoked glass panes they used as eclipse viewers, Jessie breaks the water glass and uses a sharp shard to slice her wrist, giving herself a degloving injury to lubricate her skin enough to slide her right hand from the cuff. She is able to escape the bed, reach the keys, and free her other hand, but faints from blood loss. When she awakens, it is nearly dark and the Space Cowboy has returned. Jessie throws her wedding ring at his box of jewelry and bones, thinking that is what he wanted all along. Still weak from blood loss, she reaches her car and drives away, but briefly hallucinates the Space Cowboy attacking her from the back seat. Jessie crashes and is knocked unconscious.

Months later, Jessie is recuperating. An attorney at Gerald's law firm assists her in covering up the incident to protect her and the firm from scandal, but Jessie feels this is another version of burying her trauma, just as she buried her childhood abuse. To free herself, Jessie writes to the real Ruth, with whom she has not spoken in decades, detailing what really happened at the lake house and subsequent events. The "Space Cowboy" had turned out to be a serial killer and necrophile named Raymond Andrew Joubert who had been robbing and squatting in lake houses in the area. Jessie confronts Joubert at his court hearing, where he mocks her "made of moonlight" statement, confirming that the encounter really occurred and causing Jessie to spit in his face. Being able to directly confront the man who once terrified her allows Jessie to face the other manipulative men in her life, freeing her of fear and allowing her to deal more honestly with her past. She apologizes for abandoning Ruth, acknowledging that Ruth had confronted her with a truth she could not face, and hopes they can resume their friendship. After mailing the letter, Jessie is able to sleep without nightmares for the first time since her ordeal at the lake house.

== Film adaptation ==
In May 2014, Deadline Hollywood reported that Mike Flanagan had been set to direct a film adaptation. In an interview with Rue Morgue in September 2016, Flanagan said that the film adaptation would premiere on Netflix. In October 2016, Deadline reported that Carla Gugino and Bruce Greenwood would star in the film as Jessie and Gerald Burlingame. On October 17, 2016, Flanagan tweeted indicating the first day of production had begun. The film premiered on Netflix on September 29, 2017.

== See also ==
- Solar eclipses in fiction
- Dolores Claiborne
