= 38th People's Choice Awards =

Pop culture award show held in 2012

- Date: January 11, 2012
- Location: Nokia Theatre, Los Angeles, California
- Hosted by: Kaley Cuoco

Television/radio coverage
- Network: CBS

The 38th People's Choice Awards, honoring the best in popular culture for 2011, were held on January 11, 2012 at the Nokia Theatre in Los Angeles, California, and were broadcast live on CBS at 9:00 pm ET.

Katy Perry Dominated the 38th People's Choice Awards by winning the most awards, winning five out of seven nominations, including Favorite Female Artist. Harry Potter and the Deathly Hallows – Part 2 won four awards, including Favorite Movie. How I Met Your Mother won three awards, including Favorite TV Comedy, Emma Stone won two awards, including Favorite Movie Actress. Supernatural also won two awards, including Favorite Network TV Drama.

On November 8, 2011, the nominees were announced. The film Harry Potter and the Deathly Hallows – Part 2 received the most nominations this year with nine. The TV series Glee and singer Katy Perry each received seven nominations.

== Performances ==
- Demi Lovato - "Give Your Heart a Break"
- Faith Hill - "Come Home"

== Nominees ==
Winners are listed in bold.

=== Movies ===
Favorite Movie	Favorite Action Movie
Bridesmaids; **Harry Potter and the Deathly Hallows – Part 2**; The Help; Pirates of the Caribbean: On Stranger Tides; Transformers: Dark of the Moon	Fast Five; **Harry Potter and the Deathly Hallows – Part 2**; Thor; Transformers: Dark of the Moon; X-Men: First Class
Favorite Comedy Movie	Favorite Drama Movie
Bad Teacher; **Bridesmaids**; Crazy, Stupid, Love.; Friends with Benefits; The Hangover Part II	The Adjustment Bureau; The Help; Limitless; Moneyball; **Water for Elephants**
Favorite Book Adaptation	Favorite Ensemble Movie Cast
**Harry Potter and the Deathly Hallows – Part 2**; The Help; I Am Number Four; Soul Surfer; Water for Elephants	Bridesmaids; The Hangover Part II; **Harry Potter and the Deathly Hallows – Part 2**; Pirates of the Caribbean: On Stranger Tides; X-Men: First Class
Favorite Movie Actor	Favorite Movie Actress
Daniel Radcliffe, Harry Potter and the Deathly Hallows – Part 2; Hugh Jackman, Real Steel; **Johnny Depp, Pirates of the Caribbean: On Stranger Tides**; Robert Pattinson, Water for Elephants; Ryan Reynolds, Green Lantern & The Change-Up	Anne Hathaway, One Day; **Emma Stone, The Help & Crazy, Stupid, Love.**; Jennifer Aniston, Just Go with It & Horrible Bosses; Julia Roberts, Larry Crowne; Reese Witherspoon, Water for Elephants
Favorite Action Movie Star	Favorite Movie Superhero
**Hugh Jackman, Real Steel**; Ryan Reynolds, Green Lantern; Shia LaBeouf, Transformers: Dark of the Moon; Taylor Lautner, Abduction; Vin Diesel, Fast Five	Chris Evans as Captain America (Captain America: The First Avenger); Chris Hemsworth as Thor (Thor); James McAvoy as Professor X (X-Men: First Class); Jennifer Lawrence as Mystique (X-Men: First Class); **Ryan Reynolds as Green Lantern (Green Lantern)**
Favorite Comedic Movie Actor	Favorite Comedic Movie Actress
**Adam Sandler, Just Go with It**; Ashton Kutcher, No Strings Attached; Bradley Cooper, The Hangover Part II; Ryan Reynolds, The Change-Up; Steve Carell, Crazy, Stupid, Love.	Cameron Diaz, Bad Teacher; **Emma Stone, Crazy, Stupid, Love.**; Jennifer Aniston, Just Go with It & Horrible Bosses; Mila Kunis, Friends with Benefits; Natalie Portman, No Strings Attached
Favorite Movie Star Under 25	Favorite Movie Icon
**Chloë Grace Moretz, Hugo**; Daniel Radcliffe, Harry Potter and the Deathly Hallows – Part 2; Emma Watson, Harry Potter and the Deathly Hallows – Part 2; Rupert Grint, Harry Potter and the Deathly Hallows – Part 2; Tom Felton, Harry Potter and the Deathly Hallows – Part 2	George Clooney, The Descendants & The Ides of March; Harrison Ford, Cowboys and Aliens; **Morgan Freeman, Dolphin Tale**; Robert De Niro, Limitless; Tom Hanks, Larry Crowne
Favorite Animated Movie Voice	Favorite Animated Movie
Anne Hathaway as Jewel (Rio); Jack Black as Po (Kung Fu Panda 2); **Johnny Depp as Rango (Rango)**; Katy Perry as Smurfette (The Smurfs); Owen Wilson as Lightning McQueen (Cars 2)	The Adventures of Tintin; **Cars 2**; Kung Fu Panda 2; Puss in Boots; Rango

=== Television ===
Favorite Network TV Comedy	Favorite Network TV Drama
The Big Bang Theory; Glee; **How I Met Your Mother**; Modern Family; Two and a Half Men	The Good Wife; Grey's Anatomy; House; **Supernatural**; The Vampire Diaries
Favorite TV Comedy Actor	Favorite TV Comedy Actress
Alec Baldwin, 30 Rock; Chris Colfer, Glee; Cory Monteith, Glee; Jim Parsons, The Big Bang Theory; **Neil Patrick Harris, How I Met Your Mother**	Courteney Cox, Cougar Town; Jane Lynch, Glee; Kaley Cuoco, The Big Bang Theory; **Lea Michele, Glee**; Tina Fey, 30 Rock
Favorite TV Drama Actor	Favorite TV Drama Actress
David Boreanaz, Bones; Hugh Laurie, House; Ian Somerhalder, The Vampire Diaries; **Nathan Fillion, Castle**; Patrick Dempsey, Grey's Anatomy	Blake Lively, Gossip Girl; Ellen Pompeo, Grey's Anatomy; Emily Deschanel, Bones; Eva Longoria, Desperate Housewives; **Nina Dobrev, The Vampire Diaries**
Favorite Cable TV Comedy	Favorite Cable TV Drama
**Hot in Cleveland**; It's Always Sunny in Philadelphia; Nurse Jackie; Royal Pains; Weeds	Dexter; Game of Thrones; **Pretty Little Liars**; True Blood; White Collar
Favorite TV Crime Drama	Favorite Sci-Fi/Fantasy Show
Bones; **Castle**; Criminal Minds; CSI: Crime Scene Investigation; NCIS	Fringe; **Supernatural**; True Blood; The Vampire Diaries; The Walking Dead
Favorite New TV Comedy	Favorite New TV Drama
**2 Broke Girls**; Last Man Standing; New Girl; Suburgatory; Up All Night	Once Upon a Time; **Person of Interest**; Revenge; The Secret Circle; Terra Nova
Favorite Daytime TV Host	Favorite Late Night TV Host
Al Roker, Ann Curry, Matt Lauer, Natalie Morales, & Savannah Guthrie – The Today Show; Anderson Cooper – Anderson; **Ellen DeGeneres – The Ellen DeGeneres Show**; Kelly Ripa & Regis Philbin – Live with Regis and Kelly; Rachael Ray – Rachael Ray	Conan O'Brien, Conan; David Letterman, Late Show with David Letterman; Jay Leno, The Tonight Show with Jay Leno; **Jimmy Fallon, Late Night with Jimmy Fallon**; Jimmy Kimmel, Jimmy Kimmel Live!
Favorite TV Competition Show	Favorite TV Celebreality Star
**American Idol**; America's Got Talent; Dancing with the Stars; So You Think You Can Dance; The Voice	Gene Simmons, Gene Simmons Family Jewels; Giuliana Rancic, Giuliana and Bill; Kathy Griffin, Kathy Griffin: My Life on the D-List; **Kim Kardashian, Keeping Up with the Kardashians**; Tia Mowry and Tamera Mowry, Tia & Tamera
Favorite TV Guest Star	Favorite Cartoon Show
Gwyneth Paltrow, Glee; Jim Carrey, The Office; **Katy Perry, How I Met Your Mother**; Kristin Chenoweth, Glee; Michael J. Fox, The Good Wife	American Dad!; Family Guy; The Simpsons; South Park; **SpongeBob SquarePants**

=== Music ===
Favorite Song of the Year	Favorite Album of the Year
**"E.T." by Katy Perry & Kanye West**; "The Edge of Glory" by Lady Gaga; "Moves Like Jagger" by Maroon 5 featuring Christina Aguilera; "Party Rock Anthem" by LMFAO featuring Lauren Bennett & GoonRock; "Rolling in the Deep" by Adele	"4" by Beyoncé; "21" by Adele; **"Born This Way" by Lady Gaga"**; "Femme Fatale" by Britney Spears; "Own the Night" by Lady Antebellum
Favorite Music Video	Favorite Tour Headliner
"Judas" by Lady Gaga; "**Last Friday Night" by Katy Perry**; "Party Rock Anthem" by LMFAO featuring Lauren Bennett & GoonRock; "Rolling in the Deep" by Adele; ""Run the World (Girls)" by Beyoncé	Bon Jovi; **Katy Perry**; Taylor Swift; U2; Usher
Favorite Male Artist	Favorite Female Artist
Justin Bieber; Eminem; Enrique Iglesias; **Bruno Mars**; Blake Shelton	Adele; Beyoncé; **Katy Perry**; Lady Gaga; Taylor Swift
Favorite Band	Favorite Pop Artist
Coldplay; Foo Fighters; Linkin Park; **Maroon 5**; Red Hot Chili Peppers	Beyoncé; Lady Gaga; **Demi Lovato**; Katy Perry; Rihanna
Favorite Hip Hop Artist	Favorite R&B Artist
B.o.B.; **Eminem**; Jay-Z; Nicki Minaj; Pitbull	Beyoncé; Bruno Mars; Chris Brown; Ne-Yo; **Rihanna**
Favorite Country Artist
Lady Antebellum; Rascal Flatts; Blake Shelton; **Taylor Swift**; Keith Urban
