= Gerald's Game (film) =

2017 American horror film by Mike Flanagan

- Film poster
- Directed by: Mike Flanagan
- Screenplay by: Mike Flanagan; Jeff Howard
- Based on: Gerald's Game by Stephen King
- Produced by: Trevor Macy
- Starring: Carla Gugino; Bruce Greenwood
- Cinematography: Michael Fimognari
- Edited by: Mike Flanagan
- Music by: The Newton Brothers
- Production company: Intrepid Pictures
- Distributed by: Netflix
- Release dates: September 19, 2017 (BFI Southbank); September 29, 2017 (United States)
- Running time: 103 minutes
- Country: United States
- Language: English

Gerald's Game is a 2017 American psychological horror thriller film directed and edited by Mike Flanagan, from a screenplay by Flanagan with Jeff Howard. It is based on Stephen King's 1992 novel of the same name, long thought to be unfilmable. The film stars Carla Gugino and Bruce Greenwood as a married couple who arrive at an isolated house for a holiday. When the husband dies of a sudden heart attack, his wife, left handcuffed to the bed without the key and with little hope of rescue, must find a way to survive, all while battling her inner demons.

Gerald's Game had its world premiere at BFI Southbank on September 19, 2017, and was released on September 29, 2017, by Netflix. It received positive reviews from critics, who lauded Gugino's performance and Flanagan's direction. The film's themes and their treatment were also singled out.

== Plot ==
Jessie and Gerald Burlingame arrive at an isolated lake house in Fairhope, Alabama, for a romantic getaway. While Gerald takes Viagra, Jessie offers raw Kobe steak to a stray dog before her husband leads her to the bedroom, leaving the door to the house open. Hoping to rekindle their relationship, she changes into a new slip, and he handcuffs her to the bedposts to enact a rape fantasy. She tells him to stop, leading to a heated argument, and Gerald dies of a heart attack, leaving Jessie trapped in the handcuffs.

Hours pass, and the dog enters the house, eating pieces of Gerald's corpse. A hallucination of Gerald taunts the helpless Jessie about their strained marriage and his erectile dysfunction. Dehydrated and fatigued, Jessie also hallucinates a more self-assured version of herself, who explains things about her and Gerald that she never had the courage to acknowledge. The hallucinations trigger her to remember a glass of water Gerald left on the shelf above the bed, which she reaches.

Night falls, and a deformed figure with a bag of human bones and trinkets briefly appears in the bedroom. Gerald suggests that this "Moonlight Man" is Death waiting to take Jessie, but the dog's reaction and a bloody footprint leave her unsure whether he is another hallucination. Gerald calls Jessie "Mouse," her father's nickname for her, triggering her memory of a family vacation during a solar eclipse: alone with twelve-year-old Jessie, her father coaxed her to sit on his lap, masturbating while she watched the eclipse, then manipulated her into pretending the assault never happened.

Forced to accept that she continued this cycle of repressed sexual trauma in her unhappy marriage, Jessie dreams that the Moonlight Man is licking her foot. She wakes up to find that it is the hungry dog, which Gerald points out will soon try to eat her. He explains how long it will take for her body to be discovered and warns that the Moonlight Man will be back for her after dark. In a dream, Jessie is confronted by her childhood self, who cut her hand on a glass shortly after the assault.

Determined to escape, Jessie breaks the water glass and cuts her wrist, lubricating the cuff with her own blood and degloving her hand to slip free. She reaches the handcuff key, unlocking her other hand and bandaging her wrist, but passes out. Waking up in the dark beside Gerald’s mutilated corpse, a delirious Jessie confronts the Moonlight Man and gives him her wedding ring for his bag of trinkets. She drives away but hallucinates the eclipse and the Moonlight Man in the backseat; after he whispers "Mouse" in her ear, she crashes the car and is rescued by neighbors.

Six months later, Jessie writes a letter to her twelve-year-old self. Using Gerald’s life insurance to start a foundation for fellow victims of sexual abuse, she is haunted by nightly visions of the Moonlight Man and is disturbed that the police search of the lake house never recovered her ring. News reports reveal that the Moonlight Man is actually Raymond Andrew Joubert, a necrophiliac grave robber and serial killer with acromegaly who has finally been caught; he mutilated Gerald's body for his collection of grisly trophies but spared Jessie.

Jessie arrives at court as Joubert is being arraigned. He breaks free of his handcuffs and mocks her, saying, "You're not real, you're only made of moonlight." Seeing Gerald and her father in him, she tells him, "You're so much smaller than I remember", and leaves in triumph.

== Cast ==
- Carla Gugino as Jessie Burlingame
  - Chiara Aurelia as "Mouse" (Young Jessie)
- Bruce Greenwood as Gerald Burlingame, Jessie's husband
- Carel Struycken as "Moonlight Man" / Raymond Andrew Joubert
- Henry Thomas as Tom, Jessie's father
- Kate Siegel as Sally, Jessie's mother
- Adalyn Jones as Maddie, Jessie's sister
- Bryce Harper as James, Jessie's brother

== Production ==
=== Development ===
On May 19, 2014, Deadline Hollywood reported that Mike Flanagan had been set to direct a film adaptation of Stephen King's suspense thriller novel Gerald's Game, scripted by Jeff Howard. Trevor Macy produced the film through Intrepid Pictures.

In an interview with Rue Morgue in September 2016, Flanagan stated that the film adaptation would be released by Netflix.

=== Casting ===
Carla Gugino and Bruce Greenwood were cast to play Jessie and Gerald Burlingame, along with Henry Thomas, Carel Struycken, Kate Siegel, and Chiara Aurelia.

=== Filming ===
Principal photography on the film began on October 17, 2016, in Mobile, Alabama.

== Release ==
The film was released on September 29, 2017, by Netflix.

== Critical reception ==
Gerald's Game received positive reviews from critics. On review aggregator site Rotten Tomatoes, the film holds an approval rating of 91% based on 81 reviews, with an average rating of 7.60/10. The website's critics consensus states, "Carla Gugino carries Gerald's Game's small-scale suspense with a career-defining performance." At Metacritic, which uses a weighted average, the film has a score of 77 out of 100 based on 12 critics, indicating "generally favorable" reviews. Brian Tallerico of RogerEbert.com gave it a 3/4 star rating, praising Gugino and Greenwood's performances and Flanagan's direction. Stephen King called the film "hypnotic, horrifying and terrific" after watching the rough cut.

== See also ==
- List of films featuring eclipses
