= Luckiest Girl Alive =

2015 novel by Jessica Knoll

- First edition
- Author: Jessica Knoll
- Language: English
- Genre: Mystery fiction
- Publisher: Simon & Schuster (US); Macmillan Publishers (AU)
- Publication date: May 12, 2015
- Publication place: United States

Luckiest Girl Alive is a 2015 mystery novel written by American author Jessica Knoll, and is her debut work. It was first published on May 12, 2015 by Simon & Schuster in the United States and Pan Macmillan in Australia, written in the first-person narrative. The paperback version of the book was released in April 2016; it became a New York Times best seller.

The novel follows a young woman, Ani Fanelli, who has sought to reinvent herself in her adult life, following a series of traumatic events she experienced as a teenager, including a school shooting and a gang rape.

== Synopsis ==
At first glance, 28-year-old Ani FaNelli appears to have a perfect life. She works as an editor at a glamorous New York City women's magazine called The Women's Magazine and has a loving fiancé named Luke from a wealthy family. Yet Ani also hides a secret – as a teenager, she underwent a series of horrifying and emotionally crippling events, including a school shooting, that have continued to impact her well into her adult years. During the course of the novel, it is revealed Ani was gang raped when she was 14. She tried reaching out for help after the assault, but was subjected to cruel bullying and taunts by her peers, who did not believe her. As the story progresses, Ani begins to question whether she is truly happy with who she has become, and if her current life is the one she wants and needs.

== Development ==
While writing the novel, Knoll drew upon her own experiences of being gang raped and bullied as a teenager. Knoll did not initially make this public knowledge while promoting the hardcover book, at first telling fans she based the rape and aftermath on stories she had heard from other rape survivors. In March 2016, Knoll wrote an essay for the online feminist newsletter Lenny Letter, describing her own experience. She further stated that she came forward after interacting with several fellow rape survivors at book signings. She said:

It really killed me to see the looks on these women's faces when I would say, 'Oh no, you know, I just made it up,' and I just never wanted to see that look on anyone's face again".

Knoll later stated in an interview that she "was so conditioned not to talk about it that it didn't even occur to [her] to be forthcoming".

== Reception ==
Critical reception has been positive. Luckiest Girl Alive has been compared to Gone Girl (2012) by Gillian Flynn and Paula Hawkins' The Girl on the Train (2015). The book received praise from Entertainment Weekly and USA Today, the latter of which wrote that "Recent newsworthy topics create a backdrop that can, at times, make the reader uncomfortable. Yet the visceral tension Knoll creates actually complements the reading experience."

== Film adaptation ==
In April 2015, Lionsgate announced that they had obtained the film rights to Luckiest Girl Alive, with Reese Witherspoon's Pacific Standard set to produce.

It was announced in February 2021, that Mila Kunis was set to star in the film, now at Netflix. Produced by Made Up Stories and Picturestart, with the screenplay written by Knoll, Luckiest Girl Alive got directed by Mike Barker. The movie was released on Netflix on October 7, 2022.
