= Jessica Knoll =

American writer

- Education: Shipley School; Hobart and William Smith Colleges
- Writing career
- Notable works: Luckiest Girl Alive (2015); Bright Young Women (2023)
- Website: www.jessicaknoll.com

Jessica Knoll is an American magazine editor, novelist and screenwriter. Her books include Luckiest Girl Alive (2015), The Favorite Sister (2018) and Bright Young Women (2023).

== Career ==
Knoll grew up in Philadelphia, Pennsylvania, and attended a Catholic school in Malvern, Pennsylvania. Knoll studied at the Shipley School in Bryn Mawr, Pennsylvania, then at Hobart and William Smith Colleges in Geneva, New York.

Knoll began her journalism career as an intern for Parenting magazine in New York City. She was an articles editor for Self and a senior editor for Cosmopolitan before becoming a novelist.

Knoll's 2015 debut novel, Luckiest Girl Alive, became a New York Times best seller and was included in Reese's Book Club. The book focuses on the story of TifAni FaNelli, a survivor of sexual assault and a school shooting. The book was shortlisted for the Edgar Allan Poe Award for Best First Novel and was nominated for the Dublin Literary Award.

In April 2015, Lionsgate announced that they had obtained the film rights to Luckiest Girl Alive, with Reese Witherspoon's Pacific Standard company set to produce. Knoll is the screenwriter the film adaption, Luckiest Girl Alive, and also served as an executive producer. The film was released on Netflix on October 7, 2022, starring Mila Kunis.

Knoll's novel The Favorite Sister was released in 2018. She is producing and adapting the novel for a television series with Bruna Papandrea’s Made Up Stories.

Knoll wrote the screenplay for Til Death, which made The Black List annual survey of the "most-liked" motion picture screenplays by studio and production company executives in 2019.

In 2023, Knoll released Bright Young Women, a fictionalized feminist retelling of the crimes of serial killer Ted Bundy which does not mention his name and is focused on the victims and survivors. Erik Feig’s Picturestart and Fifth Season acquired the rights to the book to develop a television series, for which Knoll will write the screenplay and will executive produce.

Her novel Helpless was released in July 2026.

== Publications ==
- Luckiest Girl Alive (2015)
- The Favorite Sister (2018)
- Bright Young Women (2023)
- Helpless (2026)
