= Luckiest Girl Alive (film) =

2022 film by Mike Barker

- Official release poster
- Directed by: Mike Barker
- Screenplay by: Jessica Knoll
- Based on: Luckiest Girl Alive by Jessica Knoll
- Produced by: Bruna Papandrea; Jeanne Snow; Erik Feig; Lucy Kitada; Mila Kunis
- Starring: Mila Kunis
- Cinematography: Colin Watkinson
- Edited by: Nancy Richardson
- Music by: Linda Perry
- Production companies: Picturestart; Made Up Stories; Orchard Farm Productions
- Distributed by: Netflix
- Release dates: September 30, 2022 (United States); October 7, 2022 (Netflix)
- Running time: 113 minutes
- Countries: United States; Australia
- Language: English

Luckiest Girl Alive is a 2022 mystery thriller film directed by Mike Barker from a screenplay by Jessica Knoll, based on her 2015 novel. The film stars Mila Kunis, Finn Wittrock, Scoot McNairy, Chiara Aurelia, Justine Lupe, Thomas Barbusca, Jennifer Beals, and Connie Britton.

Luckiest Girl Alive was released in select cinemas on September 30, 2022, before its streaming release on October 7, 2022, by Netflix.

== Plot ==
In 2015, TifAni "Ani" FaNelli, a respected New York women's magazine columnist, appears to have a picture-perfect life. As she prepares to marry her fiancé Luke Harrison, Ani meets with Aaron Wickersham, a documentary director who is making a short film about a 1999 school shooting she survived as a teenager. Aaron tells Ani that a former classmate, Dean Barton, who became a successful writer and advocate for gun control, has agreed to take part, though Ani declines to be involved.

Luke informs Ani that his firm has offered him a job opportunity in London and suggests that she should take a MFA program there to allow her to write. Ani agrees, despite having hopes of someday working at The New York Times. They later have dinner with a couple Luke knows; the husband turns out to be Ani's former teacher, Andrew Larson.

In a series of flashbacks, TifAni is seen joining the prestigious Brentley School, where she quickly befriends a clique of popular students, including Dean and his friends Liam and Peyton. It is revealed that TifAni was gang-raped at a school dance after party by all three boys while intoxicated. TifAni shared what happened with the headmaster and Mr. Larson, who encourages TifAni to tell her eccentric mother, Dina, but TifAni refuses. However, TifAni tells her friend Arthur who had been continuously bullied by the three boys.

Ani's past slowly begins to haunt her, affecting her relationship with Luke. Aaron tells Ani that Dean wants to meet with her to apologize on camera; she agrees under the condition that Aaron keeps them separate until she is ready. Meanwhile, Ani struggles with her strained relationship with Dina, who claims she always found Ani difficult and alludes that she is only marrying Luke for money.

At the documentary filming, Dean shows up unexpectedly early, causing Ani to flee in a panic. Further flashbacks reveal that Ani has been struggling to deal with the trauma of what happened. The school shooting takes place not long after, perpetrated by Arthur and his friend Ben. Peyton and Liam are killed, and Dean is wounded severely and left unable to walk. Prior to the funerals, Dean started a rumor that TifAni slept with him and helped Arthur and Ben plan the shooting. Supposedly, this was because he did not want to be her boyfriend. TifAni is consequently shunned by everyone, including Dina, who blames TifAni for causing her own rape by drinking and partying excessively.

At a presentation of his new book, Ani meets with Dean, who shows little remorse for what he did and threatens to recapitulate his story of her participation in the shooting if she tells anyone. However, after being pressed by her during the conversation, Dean admits he raped her. Having secretly recorded their conversation, Ani leaves and decides to share her experience after encouragement from her boss and ends up writing a piece for The New York Times.

At their rehearsal dinner, Ani receives the final article, which is about to be published, much to Luke's dismay, who says he wishes she had dealt with it privately. Ani then admits she has been using him to hide from her past, so decides not to marry Luke. Ani finally begins to move on; she receives an overwhelming reaction from other women who tell her their own stories of sexual assault, as she begins her career at The New York Times.

== Cast ==
- Mila Kunis as TifAni "Ani" FaNelli
  - Chiara Aurelia as young TifAni
- Finn Wittrock as Luke Harrison
- Scoot McNairy as Andrew Larson
- Justine Lupe as Nell Rutherford
- Thomas Barbusca as Arthur Finneman
- Jennifer Beals as Lolo Vincent, TifAni's boss
- Connie Britton as Dina Fanelli, TifAni's mother
- Alex Barone as Dean Barton
  - Carson MacCormac as young Dean
- Dalmar Abuzeid as Aaron Wickersham
- Isaac Kragten as Liam Ross
- Gage Munroe as Peyton Powell
- Nicole Huff as Olivia Kaplan
- Alexandra Beaton as Hilary Hitchinson
- Rodrigo Fernandez-Stoll as Williams-Sonoma Salesman

== Production ==
In August 2015, it was announced Lionsgate had acquired film rights to Luckiest Girl Alive by Jessica Knoll, with Reese Witherspoon set to produce under her Pacific Standard banner. It was scrapped, however, due to scheduling conflicts and poor budgeting. In February 2021, it was announced the film would be happening with Mila Kunis starring and Mike Barker set to direct. Netflix was to distribute. In July 2021, Finn Wittrock, Scoot McNairy, Chiara Aurelia, Thomas Barbusca, Justine Lupe, Dalmar Abuzied, Alex Barone, Carson MacCormac, Jennifer Beals, and Connie Britton joined the cast.

Principal photography began June 2021 in Toronto, Canada, and ended in September 2021 in New York City, USA. Filming locations included the cities of Whitby and Cobourg in Ontario, Canada, and Shelter Island, New York, USA.

== Release ==
Luckiest Girl Alive was released in select cinemas on September 30, 2022, before its streaming release on October 7, 2022, by Netflix.

== Reception ==
On Rotten Tomatoes, the film has an approval rating of 42% based on 55 reviews with an average rating of 5.4/10. The website's consensus reads: "Luckiest Girl Alive means well and Mila Kunis does strong work in the central role, but those positive points are overshadowed by a treatment that risks trivializing its themes." Metacritic, which uses a weighted average, assigned the film a score of 54 out of 100, based on 15 critics, indicating "mixed or average" reviews.
