= Friends with Benefits (film) =

2011 film by Will Gluck

- Theatrical release poster
- Directed by: Will Gluck
- Screenplay by: Will Gluck; Keith Merryman; David A. Newman
- Story by: Keith Merryman; David A. Newman; Harley Peyton
- Produced by: Liz Glotzer; Will Gluck; Martin Shafer; Jerry Zucker; Janet Zucker
- Starring: Justin Timberlake; Mila Kunis; Patricia Clarkson; Jenna Elfman; Bryan Greenberg; Richard Jenkins; Woody Harrelson
- Cinematography: Michael Grady
- Edited by: Tia Nolan
- Production companies: Screen Gems; Castle Rock Entertainment; Olive Bridge Entertainment; Zucker Productions
- Distributed by: Sony Pictures Releasing
- Release dates: July 18, 2011 (New York City); July 22, 2011 (United States)
- Running time: 109 minutes
- Country: United States
- Language: English
- Budget: $35 million
- Box office: $149.5 million

Friends with Benefits is a 2011 American romantic comedy film directed by Will Gluck and starring Justin Timberlake and Mila Kunis. The film features Patricia Clarkson, Jenna Elfman, Bryan Greenberg, Nolan Gould, Richard Jenkins, and Woody Harrelson in supporting roles.

The plot revolves around Dylan Harper (Timberlake) and Jamie Rellis (Kunis), who meet in New York City, and naively believe adding sex to their friendship will not lead to complications. Over time, they begin to develop deep feelings for each other, only to deny it each time they are together.

Principal casting for Friends with Benefits took place over a three-month period from April to July 2010. Gluck reworked the original script and plot shortly after casting Timberlake and Kunis. Filming began in New York City on July 20, 2010, and concluded in Los Angeles in September 2010. Sony Pictures Releasing distributed the film, which was released in North America on July 22, 2011.

Friends with Benefits received positive reviews from critics upon release, most of whom praised the chemistry between the lead actors. The film emerged as a commercial success at the box office, grossing $149.5 million worldwide, against a budget of $35 million. It was nominated for two People's Choice Awards—Favorite Comedy Movie, and Favorite Comedic Movie Actress (Kunis)—and two Teen Choice Awards for Timberlake and Kunis.

== Plot ==
Jamie Rellis, an executive headhunter in NYC, recruits Dylan Francis Harper Jr., a Los Angeles art director, to interview for a position with GQ magazine. Initially skeptical, he accepts the job after a night exploring the city with her. Dylan moves to New York, signing a one-year contract that earns Jamie a commission, and they become close platonic friends.

One night, after agreeing that sex should not require emotional attachment, they have purely casual sex. After several trysts together, Jamie decides to start dating again. So, she and Dylan return to simply being friends.

Jamie meets Parker, an oncologist for children. After five dates, they consummate their relationship as per her five-date rule, only for him to break up with her in the morning. When Jamie's free-spirited mother, Lorna, abandons their Fourth of July weekend plans at the last minute, Dylan persuades Jamie to travel with him to Los Angeles. There, she meets his sister Annie, nephew Sam, and his father, who suffers from the early stages of Alzheimer's. Though Jamie and Dylan assure his family that they are merely friends, they spend an intimate night together, having sex again.

The next day, Jamie overhears Dylan telling Annie that she is too "damaged" for him to date. Hurt, she flies home and ignores Dylan's attempts to reach her. He finds her on the roof of a skyscraper—a secret place she showed him the day they met—where she reveals that she overheard everything he said, and ends their friendship.

Some time later, Jamie discovers that Dylan may be leaving GQ for another job before his contract ends, which would affect her commission. She confronts him, leading to another argument. Jamie then spends time with her mother, while Dylan meets his father at Newark Liberty International Airport.

In a moment of Alzheimer's-induced confusion, his father mistakes a passerby for a woman from his past. Regaining his lucidity, he explains that he met "the love of my life" before marrying Dylan's mother, but let her go. Dylan's father urges him not to do the same, and to therefore reconcile with Jamie.

Realizing his true feelings for Jamie, Dylan calls Lorna to set up an excuse for Jamie to go to Grand Central Station. There he surprises her with a flash mob dancing to "Jump" and "Closing Time". After confessing his feelings to her and sharing a passionate kiss, Dylan suggests they go on their first real date. They go across the street to the Pershing Square café and are unable to keep their hands off each other.

In a post-credits scene, Dylan and Jamie watch outtakes from the fictional romantic comedy seen throughout the film.

== Cast ==
- Justin Timberlake as Dylan Harper
- Mila Kunis as Jamie Rellis
- Patricia Clarkson as Lorna Rellis, Jamie's mother
- Jenna Elfman as Annie Harper, Dylan's sister
- Bryan Greenberg as Parker
- Nolan Gould as Sam Harper, Annie's son and Dylan's nephew
- Richard Jenkins as Mr. Harper
- Woody Harrelson as Tommy Bollinger
- Emma Stone as Kayla
- Andy Samberg as Quincy
- Shaun White as himself
- Courtney Henggeler as Flight attendant
- Tiya Sircar as Hostess
- Jason Segel as Brice (uncredited)
- Rashida Jones as Madison (uncredited)

Credits adapted from AllMovie and The Guardian.

== Production ==
=== Development ===
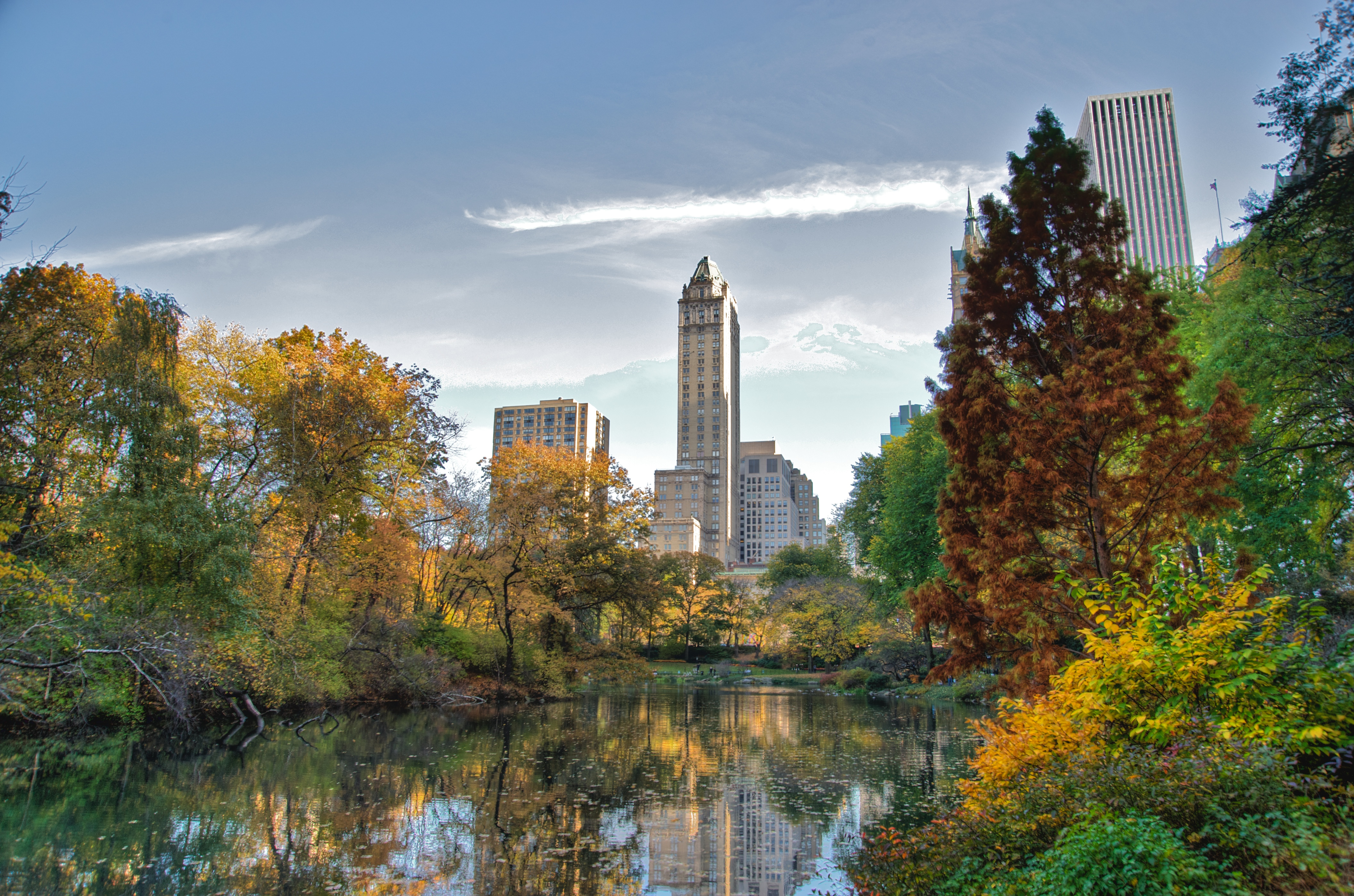
Filming locations of the film on several sections in New York City, including Central Park (pictured).

In April 2010, Justin Timberlake became the first to sign on to the project. He was soon followed by Mila Kunis when she landed the female lead opposite him. Approximately two months later, Variety magazine announced that an ensemble cast consisting of Emma Stone, Patricia Clarkson, Richard Jenkins, Woody Harrelson, Andy Samberg and Jenna Elfman were set to join them in the film. Three days after principal filming began, Bryan Greenberg completed the cast. The film features cameo appearances from Shaun White, Jason Segel, and Rashida Jones. Production locations were set up as early as July 13, and principal filmography commenced on July 20, 2010, in the Midtown Manhattan section of New York City. Filming continued in Central Park and other sections of New York City from July to early August before the production relocated to Los Angeles, California.

Paramount Pictures dropped its original protest against the film after their director, Ivan Reitman, re-titled his film, No Strings Attached. Screen Gems then moved forward with the title Friends with Benefits. At the same time, NBC was developing a sitcom with the same title, but the movie production company stated that due to its production schedule, they didn't expect an issue to arise. Screen Gems chose to accelerate production fearing that they would lose their title to the competing Paramount project. Director Will Gluck spoke about the frustration of comparing the two films, stating: "I wish there was more space between them. The thing that's irking me now is people are saying we're remaking No Strings Attached. We're not remaking it. The two movies were being made at the same time." Gluck, in an interview with The New Zealand Herald, said that both films are different. Similar sentiments were expressed by Kunis, stating, "It's just two different movies. There's only ... so many stories you can tell in the world. This is just one of the many."

The first theatrical trailer of Friends with Benefits was released on March 16, 2011. The trailer had a subsequent release on YouTube and attracted over a million views in 48 hours, becoming the second most-watched video of the day and the most-viewed video in the film category. Promotion for Friends with Benefits subsequently grew, including promotional videos from Facebook and Twitter. Timberlake and Kunis also landed on the cover of Elle in support of the film.

=== Writing ===
Will Gluck stated that the concept of the story began with the idea that he wanted to work with Kunis and Timberlake, explaining that he rewrote the script for the two actors. Following those changes, Gluck expressed that he wanted to attract a more adult audience and that he "wanted to do more of an adult movie about sex, too, and about relationships". He went on to compare the storyline of Friends with Benefits to the relationship in films between Katharine Hepburn and Spencer Tracy.

As a viewer, I don't want to walk into a movie called Friends with Benefits and see the PG-13 version. For me, you can't have a movie like that without embracing what the title is.

— Justin Timberlake

In an interview with Movieline, Gluck further discussed the film's plot saying that Friends with Benefits would relate largely with a younger generation. He added: "They comment about these romantic comedies throughout the movie, and as they go through their storyline, they realize that they're in a romantic comedy story — as two regular people who aren't in a movie would comment on. They're very cognizant that they're in this story ... but they end up embracing the fact that they're going through a romantic comedy moment." In an interview with the Los Angeles Times, Timberlake explained that he and Gluck held authorship of humor and tone in regard to Friends with Benefits. Timberlake and Kunis workshopped the script for more than a month before the movie went into production. Gluck would meet with the actors with 20 pages of script in front of him and the three would beat it up, changing lines, and defending each character's perspective.

=== Music ===
In June 2011, it was announced that Madison Gate Records would be distributing the album which featured 15 songs. The album for Friends with Benefits was released on July 19, 2011.

No.	Title	Length
1.	"Magic Carpet Ride (Philip Steir Remix)" (Steppenwolf)	3:29
2.	"L.O.V." (Fitz and the Tantrums)	3:41
3.	"Booty Call" (G. Love & Special Sauce)	3:28
4.	"New York, New York (FWB Remix)" (Ray Quinn featuring Ultra Love)	2:20
5.	"Boys Don't Cry" (Grant-Lee Phillips)	3:47
6.	"Such a Colorful World" (Max & Simon)	2:14
7.	"Satellite" (Peter Conway)	3:45
8.	"Let a Woman Be a Woman (And a Man Be a Man)" (Dyke & the Blazers)	3:12
9.	"At the Window" (Double 0 Zero)	3:50
10.	"Love's Gonna Getcha" (Tal & Acacia)	3:05
11.	"Jump" (Kris Kross)	3:17
12.	"This Too Shall Pass" (Rogue Wave)	6:13
13.	"Tightrope" (Janelle Monáe)	4:25
14.	"Take a Bow" (Greg Laswell)	3:59
15.	"Closing Time" (Semisonic)	4:34
Total length:		52:39

== Release ==
Friends with Benefits was released on DVD and Blu-ray Disc in the United States on December 2, 2011, and in the United Kingdom on February 6, 2012.

=== Critical response ===
On Rotten Tomatoes, Friends with Benefits has an approval rating of 69% based on 170 reviews with an average rating of 6.20/10. The site's critical consensus reads, "Friends with Benefits adds nothing new to its well-worn rom-com formula, but the chemistry between Justin Timberlake and Mila Kunis is almost enough to carry the movie by itself." On Metacritic, the film has a weighted average score of 63 out of 100 based on 37 critics, indicating "generally favorable" reviews. Audiences polled by CinemaScore gave the film an average grade of "B+" on an A+ to F scale.

The look, thanks to director of photography Michael Grady, and the conversations on sex and commitment are open and open-ended. Important issues about the inherent clash between changing mores and traditional values get noodled over a bit. The sex talk is graphic, the sex itself is explicit and energetic, and Jamie and Dylan have a kind of sweetness that makes you want to root for them. Ironically, the problem is that Friends with Benefits doesn't go far enough when it comes to the substantial stuff. As Freud famously said—even romantic comedies need to take their sex seriously or there will be no satisfaction.

— Betsey Sharkey of the Los Angeles Times

Manohla Dargis of The New York Times praised Friends with Benefits for its "breezy, speedy and funny comedy" and complimented the chemistry between the lead actors. Roger Ebert of the Chicago Sun-Times gave the film three stars, and remarked about the film, "What not every rom-com has, however, is good dialogue, well-delivered at a fast clip." He added, "Kunis fast-talks her way through the opening scenes as if she's channeling Juno, and Timberlake easily keeps up. At some fundamental level, I simply enjoyed watching them." Peter Debruge of Variety found the plot to be predictable and benign; however, he complimented the cast, calling Kunis "a natural with comedy", while Timberlake "exudes the kind of star wattage that put Will Smith on top." Likewise, Salon's Andrew O'Hehir asserted that despite a disappointing conclusion to the film, it was nonetheless a "rewarding summer diversion." The Guardian writer Peter Bradshaw reacted negatively to the film, expressing that there "was no benefit to watching it." Bradshaw gave the film a one-out-of-five-star rating.

The Daily Telegraph's Sukhdev Sandhu felt that Timberlake held his own when working with Kunis. Concluding his review, Sandhu presented Friends with Benefits a three out of five stars. Betsey Sharkey of the Los Angeles Times praised the acting in the film, opining that "it [brought] a lot of natural life to the party." Michael Rechtshaffen of The Hollywood Reporter gave the film a positive review, stating that there was "palpable chemistry" between Timberlake and Kunis. Entertainment Weekly writer Owen Gleiberman gave Friends with Benefits a 'B−' grade, exclaiming that while he enjoyed much of the film, he felt that it was inconsistent.

Kunis's easy authority grounds the movie, while Timberlake tapdances delightfully around the edges. His voice and his manner are light, there's barely a hair on the guy's chest, yet his confidence and wit are sexy in a way entirely befitting a smart urban romance.

— Ty Burr, of the Boston Globe

Mary Pols of Time applauded the film, and wrote that despite the plot being predictable, the film was "elevated by energetic dialogue, the sexual chemistry between the leads and the fact that the miscommunication that keeps bliss at bay ... is plausible." Giving Friends with Benefits a three-star rating, The Boston Globe journalist Ty Burr opined that the film "works like a charm." He added that it mostly keeps its manic energy in check, and that it plays to chick-flick formulas without ever groveling – which is due almost entirely to the leads." Similar sentiments were expressed by Peter Paras of E!. Giving it a 'B' grade, Paras asserted that the film was the best romantic comedy film in a long time. Melissa Leong of the National Post wrote, "While the film takes jabs at the Hollywood fairy tale, ... Gluck adheres to the formula."

=== Themes ===
According to The New York Times, Friends with Benefits, a film "about love and sex in the age of social networking, gets some of its juice and tang partly by trash-talking its own genre. The setup is familiar, as are the essential elements: a single man and a single woman, two battered hearts yet a pair of resilient, eager, pretty bodies ... Friends with Benefits starts from the premise that its characters, and you, are sick of the romantic comedy clichés they may secretly, or not so secretly, adore." Drew Pinsky, an addiction medicine specialist felt that the film's central characters, both of whom were raised by a single parent in the film, "start looking for ways to solve that problem because they were never given the opportunity to grow an emotional landscape from a nurturing, available parent. They were just quickly parentalized and became a caretaker. And the caretaking is all part of the 'going for a broken person' and trying to fix them." He further added that "love addiction ending in 'happily ever after' is not a great message."

Timberlake added that Friends with Benefits is a film for "our generation; people that are between 25 and 30 years of age that are moving into a different part of their life. They are not sure what type of commitment they are comfortable with or what they're gonna do for the rest of their life".

=== Box office ===
Friends with Benefits was released in North America on July 22, 2011, in 2,926 theaters. It collected $6,801,594 on its opening day and then grossed a total of $18,622,150 in its opening weekend, finishing third at the box office, behind Captain America: The First Avenger and Harry Potter and the Deathly Hallows – Part 2. The film grossed $55.8 million in the United States and Canada.

The film had similar success internationally. In Australia, it premiered on August 18, 2011, and earned $2.4 million during its opening weekend, charting above Green Lantern to finish first at the box office. The film expanded into Europe in September 2011. It grossed $10.6 million from over 20 territories in its first weekend. Friends with Benefits topped first place in France, where it opened with $1.8 million. The film performed highest in the United Kingdom and Germany, where it grossed $3.1 million and $2.6 million in its first weekend upon release, respectively. By mid-September, the film had grossed over $29.6 million internationally. It went on to gross over $149.5 million worldwide, with international grosses standing at $93.7 million.

=== Accolades ===
Awards	Category	Nominee	Result
2011 Teen Choice Awards	Choice Summer Movie Star: Male	Justin Timberlake	Nominated
2011 Teen Choice Awards	Choice Summer Movie Star: Female	Mila Kunis	Nominated
2012 People's Choice Awards	Favorite Comedy Movie	Friends with Benefits	Nominated
2012 People's Choice Awards	Favorite Comedic Movie Actress	Mila Kunis	Nominated
2012 Rembrandt Awards	Best Foreign Actress	Mila Kunis	Nominated

== See also ==
- No Strings Attached
- When Harry Met Sally
- Befikre
