= Norman Fell =

American actor (1924–1998)

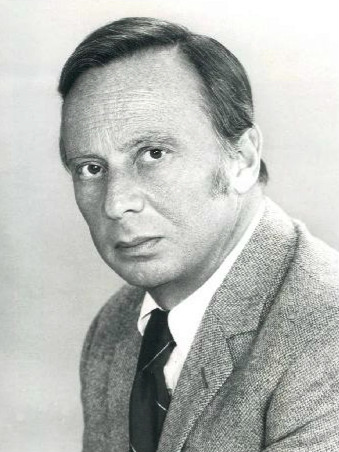
- Fell in 1970
- Born: Norman Noah Feld; March 24, 1924; Philadelphia, Pennsylvania, U.S.
- Died: December 14, 1998 (aged 74); Los Angeles, California, U.S.
- Education: Temple University
- Occupation: Actor
- Years active: 1954–1998
- Television: Three's Company
- Spouses: Dolores Pikoos (m. 1950; div. 1954) Diane Weiss (m. 1961; div. 1973) Karen Weingard (m. 1975; div. 1995)

Norman Fell (born Norman Noah Feld; March 24, 1924 – December 14, 1998) was an American actor of film and television, most famous for his role as landlord Mr. Roper on the sitcom Three's Company and its spin-off, The Ropers, and his film roles in Ocean's 11 (1960), The Graduate (1967), and Bullitt (1968). Early in his career, he was billed as Norman Feld.

== Early life ==
Fell was born on March 24, 1924, in Philadelphia, Pennsylvania, to Samuel and Edna Feld. His father was an Austrian Jewish immigrant, and his maternal grandparents were Russian Jews. He attended Central High School of Philadelphia. He studied drama at Temple University after serving as a tail gunner on a B-25 Mitchell in the United States Army Air Forces during World War II. He later honed his craft at The Actors Studio and the Black Hills Players.

== Career ==
Aside from Fell's best-known television work, he also played minor character roles in several films, including the original Ocean's 11 with the Rat Pack; It's a Mad, Mad, Mad, Mad World; PT 109 with Cliff Robertson as John F. Kennedy; Mike Nichols' The Graduate; Don Siegel's Charley Varrick; Bullitt with Steve McQueen; and Catch-22 (as Sergeant Towser). He appeared alongside Ronald Reagan in Reagan's last film, The Killers with Lee Marvin and Clu Gulager, in which Reagan portrays a villain who slaps Angie Dickinson. In 1992, he starred as a hotel owner in a comedy film titled Hexed.

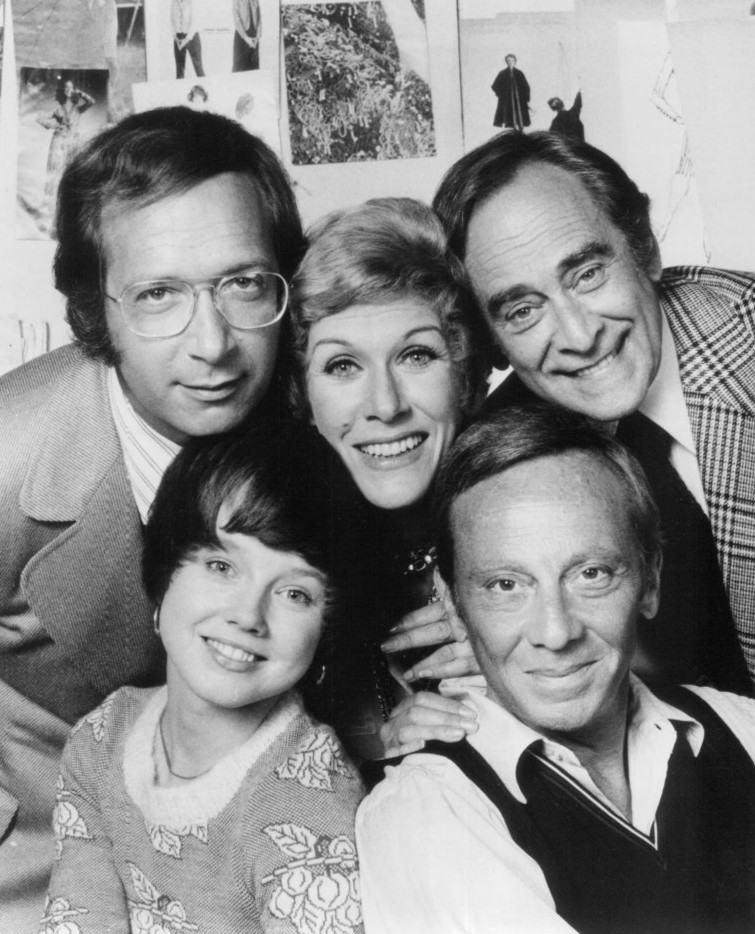
Cast of NBC series Needles and Pins, 1973. Bottom, from left: Deirdre Lenihan, Fell. Top, from left: Bernie Kopell, Sandra Deel, and Louis Nye.

On TV, Fell portrayed Mike in Joe and Mabel (1955–1956), Howie Fletcher in The Tom Ewell Show (1960–1961), Meyer Meyer in 87th Precinct (1961–1962), Charles Wilentz in Dan August (1970–1971), Nathan Davidson in Needles and Pins (1973), Bernie Solkin in Executive Suite (1976–1977), Richie's father in Richie Brockelman, Private Eye (1978), and Ben Cooper in Teachers Only (1982–1983).

From 1977 to 1979, Fell portrayed the main characters' landlord Stanley Roper on the hit sitcom Three's Company (a role with some similarities to hard-edged, suspicious landlord Mr. McCleery in The Graduate, who was on the lookout for reasons to evict Benjamin Braddock, like Mr. Roper was with Jack Tripper). He continued the role as the co-lead with Audra Lindley playing his wife, Helen, on The Ropers, a spin-off which lasted two seasons, airing from 1979 to 1980.

Fell won a Golden Globe Award for Best TV Actor in a Supporting Role in 1979 for Three's Company. He was nominated for an Emmy Award for his dramatic performance as the boxing trainer of Tom Jordache (Nick Nolte) in the miniseries Rich Man, Poor Man. His final television appearance was a cameo as Mr. Roper on an episode of the sitcom Ellen in 1997.

== Personal life ==
On May 21, 1950, Fell married Dolores Pikoos in Philadelphia. They divorced in 1954 and Fell married and divorced two subsequent times. He had two daughters, Tracy and Mara, with his second wife and adopted a son with his third wife, Karen Weingard.

== Illness and death ==
On November 26, 1998 (Thanksgiving Day), Fell was rushed to the hospital and diagnosed with multiple myeloma (plasma cell cancer) after becoming too weak to get out of bed at his Marina del Rey home. He died at the Motion Picture and Television Country House and Hospital in Woodland Hills, California on December 14, 1998, at the age of 74.

== Filmography ==
Year	Title	Role	Notes
1954	Studio One	Juror No. 1	"Twelve Angry Men" (TV episode; teleplay)
1957	The Violators	Ray	
1959	Pork Chop Hill	Sergeant Coleman	
1960	Inherit the Wind	WGN Radio Technician	
1960	The Rat Race	Telephone Repairman	
1960	Ocean's 11	Peter Rheimer	
1963	PT 109	Machinist Edmund Drewitch	
1963	It's a Mad, Mad, Mad, Mad World	Detective at Grogan's Crash Site	
1964	The Killers	Mickey Farmer	
1964	Quick, Before it Melts	George Snell	
1964	The Young Warriors	Sergeant Wadley	
1967	Fitzwilly	Oberblatz	
1967	The Graduate	Mr. McCleery	
1968	Sergeant Ryker	Sergeant Max Winkler	Archive footage
1968	The Secret War of Harry Frigg	Captain Stanley	
1968	The Young Runaways	Mr. Donford	
1968	Bullitt	Captain Baker	
1969	If It's Tuesday, This Must Be Belgium	Harve Blakely	
1970	Catch-22	First Sergeant Towser	
1970	The Boatniks	Max	
1973	The Stone Killer	Lieutenant Les Daniels	
1973	Charley Varrick	Mr. Garfinkle	
1974	Airport 1975	Bill	
1975	Cleopatra Jones and the Casino of Gold	Stanley Nagel	
1976	Guardian of the Wilderness	Doctor	
1978	Rabbit Test	Segoynia's Father	
1978	The End	Dr. Samuel Krugman	
1981	Crunch		
1981	On the Right Track	The Mayor	
1981	Heartbreak High	Jack McGuire	
1981	Paternity	Larry	
1985	Transylvania 6-5000	Mac Turner	
1987	Stripped to Kill	Ray	
1989	C.H.U.D. II: Bud the C.H.U.D.	Tyler	
1990	You're Driving Me Crazy	Doctor 'F'	
1991	With Friends Like These...	Narrator	Direct-to-video
1991	The Boneyard	Shepard	Direct-to-video
1991	For the Boys	Sam Schiff	
1992	The Naked Truth	The Dentist	
1993	Hexed	Herschel Levine	
1996	The Destiny of Marty Fine	Daryl	
1996	Beach House	The Landlord	

== Television ==
Year	Title	Role	Notes
1954	The Elgin Hour	Morton	Season 1 Episode 5: "Hearts and Hollywood"
1954	Westinghouse Studio One	(2) Foreman & Juror #1	(1) Season 6 Episode 18: "A Criminal Design" (2) Season 7 Episode 1: "Twelve Angry Men"
1954	The Philco Television Playhouse		Season 6 Episode 17: "Miss Look-Alike"
1954	Goodyear Television Playhouse		Season 3 Episode 11: "The Huntress"
1955	Westinghouse Studio One	(2) Jake	(1) Season 7 Episode 17: "Grandma Rolled Her Own" (2) Season 7 Episode 28: "Dominique"
1956	The Alcoa Hour	Marvie	Season 1 Episode 13: "Finkle's Comet"
1956	Joe and Mabel	(1) Mike (2) (3) (4) Harry	(1) Season 1 Episode 1*: "Joe's Bankbook" (aired June 26) (2) Season 1 Episode: "The Line-Up" (aired July 10) (3) Season 1 Episode 11*: "Mabel's Voice" (aired September 4) (4) Episode: "Mabel's Legacy" (aired September 18) * Episodes were first produced in 1955 but were thrown out, with CBS starting completely over in 1956. See show homepage for details.
1956	Star Tonight	Sharp	Season 2 Episode 39: "Faith and Patience"
1956	Playwrights '56	Nick Zervas	Season 1 Episode 19: "Nick and Letty"
1956	The United States Steel Hour	Detective	Season 4 Episode 7: "Hunted"
1957	Westinghouse Studio One		Season 9 Episode 40: "Love Me to Pieces"
1959	Hallmark Hall of Fame	Wint Selby	TV movie: "Ah, Wilderness!"
1960	Johnny Staccato	Bill Lentz	Season 1 Episode 17: "The Man in the Pit"
1960	Perry Mason	Caspar Pedley	Season 3 Episode 17: "The Case of the Mythical Monkeys"
1960	The Untouchables	Reiner	Season 2 Episode 1: "The Rusty Heller Story"
1960	The Tom Ewell Show	Howie Fletcher	(1) Season 1 Episode 4: "Tom Takes Over" (2) Season 1 Episode 6: "The Second Phone" (3) Season 1 Episode 7: "The Handwriting on the Wall" (4) Season 1 Episode 8: "The Spelling Bee" (5) Season 1 Episode 11: "Salesmanship Lesson"
1961	The Law and Mr. Jones	Fred Cook	Season 1 Episode 18: "Lethal Weapons"
1961	The Tab Hunter Show	Emory Farnsworth	Season 1 Episode 23: "Me and My Shadow"
1961	Peter Gunn	Danny Carmichael	Season 3 Episode 20: "A Kill and a Half"
1961	The Aquanauts	Oliver Pappas	Season 1 Episode 25: "The Rainbow Adventure"
1961	The Many Loves of Dobie Gillis	Cole	Season 2 Episode 31: "Be It Ever So Humble"
1961	Checkmate	Shep Stryker	Season 1 Episode 34: "Hot Wind in a Cold Town"
1961	Cain's Hundred	Frank Driscoll	Season 1 Episode 13: "Final Judgment: "Alexander Marish"
1961–1962	87th Precinct	Detective Meyer Meyer	Regular cast (30 episodes)
1962	Sam Benedict	Alex McConnell	Season 1 Episode 15: "Where There's a Will"
1963	The Eleventh Hour	Lionel	Season 1 Episode 22: "Five Moments Out of Time"
1963	The Lloyd Bridges Show	(1) Piggy (2) Mel Baxter	(1) Season 1 Episode 25: "Gym in January" (2) Season 1 Episode 26: "Sheridan Square"
1963	The Dick Powell Show	Dr. Joseph Greer	Season 2 Episode 28: "The Last of the Big Spenders"
1963	The Lieutenant	Jerry Belman	Season 1 Episode 2: "Cool of the Evening"
1963	Kraft Suspense Theatre	Sergeant Max Winkler	(1) Season 1 Episode 1: "The Case Against Paul Ryker: Part 1" (2) Season 1 Episode 2: "The Case Against Paul Ryker: Part 2"
1963	East Side/West Side	Eddie Best	Season 1 Episode 9: "Not Bad for Openers"
1963	The Alfred Hitchcock Hour	Al Norman	Season 2 Episode 9: "The Dividing Wall"
1964	The Defenders	George Capp	Season 3 Episode 23: "Moment of Truth"
1964	The Hanged Man	Gaylord Grebb	TV movie
1964–1965	Ben Casey	(1) Arnold Halbert (2) Manny Berger	(1) Season 3 Episode 18: "I'll Get on My Ice Floe and Wave Goodbye" (1964) (2) Season 4 Episode 15: "Where Does the Boomerang Go?" (1965)
1964–1966	Twelve O'Clock High	(1) Lieutenant Canello (2) Major Praeger	(1) Season 1 Episode 14: "An Act of War" (1964) (2) Season 3 Episode 7: "The All-American" (1966)
1965	Mr. Novak	Barney Sanders	Season 2 Episode 29: "And Then I Wrote..."
1965	The Trials of O'Brien	Mickey the Miser	Season 1 Episode 9: "How Do You Get to Carnegie Hall?"
1965	Dr. Kildare	(1) Dr. Keith Myers (2) (3) (4) (5) Arnold Vitnack	(1) Season 4 Episode 31: "A Reverence for Life" (2) Season 5 Episode 20: "Fathers and Daughters" (3) Season 5 Episode 21: "A Gift of Love" (4) Season 5 Episode 22: "The Tent Dwellers" (5) Season 5 Episode 23: "Going Home"
1965	The Fugitive	(1) Lieutenant Germak (2) Lieutenant Green	(1) Season 2 Episode 25: "May God Have Mercy" (2) Season 3 Episode 12: "Stranger in the Mirror"
1965–1969	The F.B.I.	(1) Ted Cullinan (2) Ken Haney (3) Victor Green	(1) Season 1 Episode 11: "All the Streets Are Silent" (1965) (2) Season 3 Episode 27: "The Mercenary" (1968) (3) Season 4 Episode 22: "The Catalyst" (1969)
1966	The Wild Wild West	Jeremiah Ratch	Season 1 Episode 20: "The Night of the Whirring Death"
1966	The Man from U.N.C.L.E.	Mark Slate	Season 2 Episode 23: "The Moonglow Affair"
1966	A Man Called Shenandoah	Captain Arnold Dudley	Season 1 Episode 24: "Muted Fifes, Muffled Drums"
1966	Bob Hope Presents the Chrysler Theatre	Eddie Carr	Season 4 Episode 7: "Dear Deductible"
1966	Bewitched	Dr. Freud	Season 3 Episode 10: "I'd Rather Twitch Than Fight"
1967	The Invaders	Neal Taft	Season 1 Episode 11: "The Betrayed"
1967	Ghostbreakers	Lieutenant P.J. Hartunain	TV movie
1967	I Spy	Karin	Season 3 Episode 4: "The Medarra Block"
1967	Mannix	Daniel Brewer	Season 1 Episode 10: "Coffin for a Clown"
1967–1969	Ironside	(1) Captain Lauren (2) Lieutenant Haines	(1) Season 1 Episode 6: "An Inside Job" (1967) (2) Season 3 Episode 7: "Seeing Is Believing" (1969)
1968	That Girl	Bernie Perperni	Season 2 Episode 19: "Sixty-Five on the Aisle"
1968	Judd, for the Defense	Harry Green	Season 2 Episode 5: "The Sound of the Plastic Axe"
1969	The Name of the Game	Winston Polk	Season 2 Episode 2: "A Hard Case of the Blues"
1969	Three's a Crowd	Norman, the Elevator Operator	TV movie
1969–1972	Love, American Style	(1) Jack 'J.K.' Lewis (2) Ralph Albertson	(1) Season 1 Episode 9 (Segment: "Love and the Good Deal") (1969) (2) Season 4 Episode 8 (Segment: "Love and the Clinic") (1972)
1970	Double Jeopardy	Sergeant Charles Wilentz	TV movie
1970–1971	Dan August	Sergeant Charles Wilentz	26 episodes
1971	The Partridge Family	Mr. Bruner	Season 2 Episode 4: "The Undergraduate"
1972	O'Hara, U.S. Treasury	Leo Walsh	Season 1 Episode 22: "Operation – Smokescreen"
1972	The Heist	Pat Dillon	TV movie
1972	McCloud	Lieutenant Ed Feldman	Season 3 Episode 3: "The Park Avenue Rustlers"
1973	Marcus Welby, M.D.	George Manning	Season 4 Episode 20: "Catch a Ring That Isn't There"
1973	Going Places	Mr. Shaw	TV movie
1973	Needles and Pins	Nathan Davidson	Regular cast (14 episodes)
1973	Griff		Season 1 Episode 10: "Hammerlock"
1974	Medical Center	Frank	Season 5 Episode 22: "The World's Balloon"
1974	Thursday's Game	Melvin Leonard	TV movie
1974–1977	Police Story	(1) Sergeant Dell (2) Lieutenant Alfred Thornwood	(1) Season 2 Episode 8: "Wolf" (1974) (2) Season 4 Episode 19: "One of Our Cops is Crazy"
1975	Death Stalk	Frank Cody	TV movie
1975	McMillan & Wife	Allan Kovacs	Season 4 Episode 6: "Love, Honor and Swindle"
1975	Lucas Tanner	Abe Lydecker	Season 1 Episode 19: "The Noise of a Quiet Weekend"
1975	Rhoda	Dr. Henry Gerber	(1) Season 1 Episode 21: "Chest Pains" (2) Season 2 Episode 3: "Ida's Doctor"
1975	Cannon	Police Lieutenant	Season 5 Episode 15: "The Games Children Play"
1975	Starsky & Hutch	Sammy Grovner	Season 1 Episode 15: "Shootout"
1976	Rich Man, Poor Man	Smitty	Mini-Series (1) Season 1 Episode 3: Part III: Chapter 5" (2) Season 1 Episode 4: "Part IV: Chapter 6" (3) Season 1 Episode 5: "Part V: Chapter 7" (4) Season 1 Episode 9: "Part VIII: Chapters 11 and 12"; Emmy Award (nominated)
1976	Ellery Queen	Errol Keyes	Season 1 Episode 19: "The Adventure of the Tyrant of Tin Pan Alley"
1976	Risko	Max	TV movie; Unsold TV Pilot
1976	The Bionic Woman	Milt Bigelow	Season 2 Episode 2: "In This Corner, Jaime Sommers"
1976	The Streets of San Francisco	Juror	(1) Season 5 Episode 1: "The Thrill Killers: Part 1" (2) Season 5 Episode 2: "The Thrill Killers: Part 2"
1976	Richie Brockelman: The Missing 24 Hours	Mr. Brockelman	TV movie
1976	Switch	Marty	Season 2 Episode 7: "Gaffing the Skim"
1976	Executive Suite	Bernie	Season 1 Episode 10: "Re: The Sounds of Silence"
1976–1981	Three's Company	Stanley Roper	56 episodes; Golden Globe Award (won)
1977	The Life and Times of Grizzly Adams	Mitch Morgan	Season 1 Episode 7: "The Redemption of Ben"
1977	Charlie's Angels	Sammy	Season 2 Episode 1: "Angels in Paradise"
1978	The Love Boat	Mr. McCoy, Julie's Father	Season 2 Episode 3: "Julie's Dilemma/Who's Who/Rocky"
1979	Roots: The Next Generations	Bernie Raymond	Mini-Series; Season 1 Episode 7: "Part VII (1960–1967)"
1979–1980	The Ropers	Stanley Roper	28 episodes
1980	Getting There	Jim	TV movie
1980	This Year's Blonde	Pat Toledo	TV movie
1980	For the Love of It	Hall	TV movie
1982	Matt Houston	Herman	Season 1 Episode 9: "Joey's Here"
1982–1983	Teachers Only	Ben Cooper	21 episodes
1983	Uncommon Valor	Garvin	TV movie
1984	The Jesse Owens Story	Marty Forkins	TV movie
1985	Simon & Simon	Leo Nyquist	Season 5 Episode 11: "Facets"
1985–1986	Crazy Like a Fox	(2) Inspector Peyton	(1) Season 2 Episode 7: "Some Day My Prints Will Come" (1985) (2) Season 2 Episode 22: "A Fox at the Races" (1986)
1985–1988	Murder, She Wrote	(1) Vince Shackman (2) Lieutenant Rupp	(1) Season 2 Episode 8: "Dead Heat" (1985) (2) Season 4 Episode 19: "Just Another Fish Story" (1988)
1986	Webster	Charlie	Season 3 Episode 21: "Almost Home"
1986	The Twilight Zone	Eddie O'Hara	Season 2 Episode 6: "The Convict's Piano"
1986	It's Garry Shandling's Show	Self	Season 1 Episode 5: "The Graduate"
1987	Magnum, P.I.	David Albertson	Season 7 Episode 15: "Solo Flight"
1987	Matlock	Dr. Norman Radburn	Season 1 Episode 24: "The Doctors"
1987	Out of This World	Dr. Hauser	Season 1 Episode 3: "The Nightmare"
1987	Sledge Hammer!	Doctor	Season 2 Episode 13: "They Call Me Mr. Trunk"
1988–1989	The Boys	Dave	(1) Season 1 Episode 1: "Gene's Problem" (1988) (2) Season 1 Episode 2: "Some Don't Like It Hot" (1989) (3) Season 1 Episode 5: "Friar's Club" (1989) (4) Season 1 Episode 8: "Labor Day" (1989)
1989	Hooperman	Pete Cosgrove, Ventriloquist	Season 2 Episode 16: "Dog Day Afternoon, Morning and Night"
1989	The Super Mario Bros. Super Show!	(1) Fred Van Winkle (2) Ted Bull	(1) Season 1 Episode 25: "Fred Van Winkle" (2) Season 1 Episode 44: "Texas Tea"
1990	Good Grief	Slezar	Season 1 Episode 7: "The Good, the Bad and the Mariachis"
1993	Flying Blind	Employer #2	Season 1 Episode 14: "Panic in Neil's Park"
1994	The Fresh Prince of Bel-Air	The Landlord	Season 5 Episode 2: "What's Will Got to Do With It?"
1995	Family Reunion: A Relative Nightmare	Grandpa Joe Dooley	TV movie
1997	The Naked Truth	Himself	Season 3 Episode 3: "Bully for Dave"
1997	Ellen	Mr. Roper	Season 5 Episode 3: "Roommates"
1998	Life With Louie	Vic	Season 3 Episode 11: "Blinded by Love" (voice)
