= Glass Houses (1972 film) =

1972 film by Alexander Singer

- Movie Poster
- Directed by: Alexander Singer
- Written by: Alexander Singer; Judith Singer
- Produced by: George Folsey Jr.
- Starring: Bernard Barrow; Jennifer O'Neill; Deirdre Lenihan; Ann Summers; Phillip Pine; Eve McVeagh
- Cinematography: George J. Folsey
- Edited by: George Folsey Jr.
- Music by: David Raksin
- Distributed by: Columbia Pictures
- Release date: June 1, 1972 (United States)
- Running time: 103 minutes
- Country: United States
- Language: English

Glass Houses is a 1972 American drama-romance film released by Columbia Pictures in 1972, but it was filmed in 1970. It is of interest in film history because of the credentials of its key personnel.

Glass Houses was directed by Alexander Singer, notable for his work on the Star Trek series Star Trek: The Next Generation. It was one of the early screen appearances of actress Jennifer O'Neill, best known for her role in Summer of '42 (1972).

Glass Houses cinematography was by cinematographer George J. Folsey, whose credits include films such as Meet Me In St. Louis (1944) and Seven Brides For Seven Brothers (1954). The score was composed by David Raksin, famous for his musical score in Laura (1944).

== Plot ==
The film's plot centres around the libidinous sexual shenanigans of a middle-class Californian family and explores themes such as marital discord, middle age, adultery, search for one's self, and incestuous desire. It is somewhat similar to the film Bob & Carol & Ted & Alice (1969).

Victor (Bernard Barrow) is a bored, married businessman carrying on an illicit affair with his attractive girlfriend Jean (Jennifer O'Neill). His sexually frustrated, vivacious wife Adele (Ann Summers) involves herself with community civic meetings to do "something" for the community.

Victor and Adele's nubile daughter Kim (Deirdre Lenihan) has a secret attraction to her father of which she cannot let go. As she cannot have her father, she takes up with a man of the same age, this being her father's business associate Ted (Phillip Pine). At one of her civic meetings, Adele bonds with her neighbor, pipe-smoking sex novelist Les Turner (Clarke Gordon), and she has an affair with him, albeit with ambivalence.

Events in the film reach a head when Victor and Jean bump into Kim and her older lover at a health/new age resort. The pairing of Kim and Ted causes a falling out of the two men, and Victor reassesses his relationship to the spirited Jean. The film concludes on a cryptic note with Victor's coming home after leaving his daughter at her friend's house, looking for his wife. He is shown watching television in the living room, lying on the sofa, when it appears that Kim is at his side, or is she? Does Kim actually have her way with her father, or is it all just a fantasy, and if this is so, whose fantasy is it? The film's final sequence leaves this open for the audience to interpret any which way it deems.

== Critical reception ==
Despite featuring some of the top character actors of the time, including Phillip Pine and Eve McVeagh, the film has had a mixed reception at best. Reviewers such as Leonard Maltin pronounced the film as being a "low-grade drama about infidelity and incestuous desire [that] is mildly interesting in a lurid kind of way," (Maltin, 1991: 451). Vincent Canby from The New York Times was more generous, writing that "it is a fairly intelligent, perceptive look at a group of rather shabby people whose emotions are no deeper, nor more complex, than the movie that records them." (Canby, 1972). Clive Hirschhorn described it as "a wryly observed poke at a libidinous group of middle-class nonentities," (Hirschhorn, 1989: 296).

== See also ==
- List of American films of 1972
