= Samantha Sloyan =

American actress (born 1979)

- Sloyan in 2026
- Born: January 4, 1979 (age 47); Los Angeles County, California, U.S.
- Occupations: Actress; producer
- Years active: 2003–present
- Parents: James Sloyan (father); Deirdre Lenihan (mother)

Samantha Sloyan (born January 4, 1979) is an American actress. Sloyan is best known for her multiple collaborations with filmmaker Mike Flanagan in Hush (2016), The Haunting of Hill House (2018), Midnight Mass (2021), The Midnight Club (2022), The Fall of the House of Usher (2023), The Life of Chuck (2024), Carrie (2026) and the upcoming The Exorcist: Martyrs (2027). She has also appeared in recurring roles on Scandal (2012–2014) and the twelfth season of Grey's Anatomy (2015–2016). She is the daughter of actors James Sloyan and Deirdre Lenihan.

== Early life ==
Born in Los Angeles County on January 4, 1979, Sloyan is one of two children, one girl and one boy, born to actors James Sloyan and Deirdre Lenihan. Sloyan is also the niece of Pulitzer Prize-winning journalist Patrick Sloyan.

== Career ==
Sloyan first appeared in the 2003 independent feature film My Life with Morrissey as a florist. She continued to appear in a few short films such as No Shoulder, Shamelove, and Autodoc. In 2009, she produced and starred in the short film Plus One. Sloyan has also guest-starred in several television series such as The Beast, The Forgotten, Law & Order: LA, and NCIS. She played a recurring role as a White House employee named Jeannine Locke in the first three seasons of Scandal. Sloyan continued to appear in smaller films, including In the Key of Eli, Tape 407, and the television movie Murder in Mexico: The Bruce Beresford-Redman Story.

In 2014, Sloyan guest-starred on Castle, Parks and Recreation, Hawaii Five-0, and Rizzoli & Isles. She began a recurring role in the ShondaLand production Grey's Anatomy as Dr. Penelope Blake, first appearing in the eleventh season episode "How to Save a Life", which included the death of lead character, Derek Shepherd, played by Patrick Dempsey. She appeared again in the 12th season, including the show's 250th episode "Guess Who's Coming to Dinner", which was mostly focused on Sloyan's character.

In 2021, Sloyan portrayed Catholic Beverly Keane in the miniseries Midnight Mass, directed by Mike Flanagan. In 2026, she portrays Margaret White in Flanagan's horror television series, Carrie.

On stage, Sloyan acted at the Geffen Playhouse and the Segerstrom Center for the Arts. She received the LADCC and LA Weekly awards for her performance in Munched.

== Filmography ==
=== Film ===
| Year | Title | Role | Notes | Ref. |
|---|---|---|---|---|
| 2003 | My Life with Morrissey | Florist | Independent feature film | |
| 2005 | No Shoulder | Bobbie | Short film | |
| 2005 | 3 Wise Women | Waitress #2 | | |
| 2006 | Shamelove | Julie | | |
| 2009 | Plus One | Lindsay | Short film; also producer | |
| 2009 | Autodoc | Emmy Hennings | | |
| 2011 | In the Key of Eli | Megs | | |
| 2012 | Area 407 | Lois | Originally titled Tape 407: The Mesa Reserve | |
| 2013 | Do You Have a Cat? | Marissa | Short film | |
| 2016 | Losing In Love | Dr. Barton | | |
| 2016 | Fantastic | Michelle | | |
| 2016 | Hush | Sarah Greene | | |
| 2016 | Cat Killer | The Mother | Short film | |
| 2017 | I'm Not Here | Jaime | Short film | |
| 2019 | Pappy Hour | Jean Mulligan | Short film | |
| 2019 | Miss Virginia | Mrs. Watson | | |
| 2023 | Good Daughter | Rebecca | Short film | |
| 2023 | Love You, Mama | Lee | Short film | |
| 2023 | Invaders From Proxima B | Jane Jankins | Online released in May 2024 | |
| 2024 | The Place Between | Beatrice | | |
| 2024 | The Life of Chuck | Miss Rohrbacher | | |
| 2025 | It's Expensive To Be Poor | Narrator | Short film | |
| 2027 | The Exorcist: Martyrs | TBA | Post-production | |
| TBA | Grace | Bonnie | Short film | |
| TBA | Silver Anniversary | TBA | Short film | |

=== Television ===
| Year | Title | Role | Notes | Ref. |
|---|---|---|---|---|
| 2009 | The Beast | Grace Morton | Episode: "No Turning Back" | |
| 2009 | The Forgotten | Nurse | Episode: "Railroad Jane" | |
| 2010 | Law & Order: LA | Rachel Forester | Episode: "Echo Park" | |
| 2011 | The Cape | Television reporter | Episode: "Endgame" | |
| 2011 | NCIS | Emily Goodwin | Episode: "Engaged (Part I)" | |
| 2012–2014 | Scandal | Sassy Staffer | Episode: "The Trail" | |
| 2012–2014 | Scandal | Jeannine Locke | Recurring role; 7 episodes (seasons 2–3) | |
| 2013 | The Fosters | ER Doctor | Episode: "Vigil" | |
| 2014 | Castle | Pam Clark | Episode: "Room 147" | |
| 2014 | Parks and Recreation | Erica | Episode: "New Slogan" | |
| 2014 | Hawaii Five-0 | Sarah Richmond | Episode: "Ho'i Hou" | |
| 2014 | Futurestates | Lisa | Episode: "Ant" | |
| 2014 | Rizzoli & Isles | Alex Ruebens | Episode: "If You Can't Stand the Heat" | |
| 2015–2016 | Grey's Anatomy | Dr. Penelope "Penny" Blake | Recurring role; 20 episodes (seasons 11–12) | |
| 2015 | Murder in Mexico | Gretchen Thorne | Television film | |
| 2015 | Criminal Minds | Tracy Senarak | Episode: "The Witness" | |
| 2017 | Maggie | Dr. White | Episodes: "Past Life Depression" & "Denying Everything About Death" | |
| 2017 | The Good Doctor | Mrs. Gallico | Episode: "Point Three Percent" | |
| 2018 | Here and Now | Officer | Episode: "It's Coming" | |
| 2018 | The Haunting of Hill House | Leigh Crain | Recurring role; 8 episodes | |
| 2018–2019 | SEAL Team | Victoria Seaver | Recurring role; 4 episodes (season 2) | |
| 2019 | Proven Innocent | Gabrielle Parcell | Episode: "Shaken" | |
| 2019 | Animal Kingdom | Jennifer | Episode: "Know Thy Enemy" | |
| 2019 | The Rookie | Alice Sheldon | Episode: "Warriors and Guardians" | |
| 2019 | Truth Be Told | Sharon Dostikas | Episode: "Not Buried, Planted" | |
| 2019 | Everyone Together | Caroline | Unsold television pilot | |
| 2020 | Helstrom | Jolene Spivey | Episodes: "Leviathan" & "Scars" | |
| 2021 | Midnight Mass | Beverly "Bev" Keane | Miniseries; 7 episodes | |
| 2022 | The Midnight Club | Shasta | Miniseries; 7 episodes | |
| 2023 | Minx | Joan Didion | Episode: "I Thought the Bed Was Gonna Fly" | |
| 2023 | The Morning Show | Cheryl | Episode: "The Stanford Student" | |
| 2023 | The Fall of the House of Usher | Tamerlane Usher | Miniseries; 8 episodes | |
| 2023 | Creepshow | Lorna Snell | Episode: "Twenty Minutes with Cassandra" | |
| 2025 | The Pitt | Lily Bradley | Recurring role; 7 episodes (season 1) | |
| 2026 | Carrie | Margaret White | Main role; 8 episodes (season 1) | |
