= Deirdre Lenihan =

American actress (born 1946)

- Lenihan in Needles and Pins, 1973
- Born: May 19, 1946 (age 80); New York City, U.S.
- Occupation: Actress
- Years active: 1970s–1980
- Spouse: James Sloyan (m. 1973; died 2026)
- Children: 2, including Samantha Sloyan

Deirdre Lenihan (born May 19, 1946) is an American former actress best known for portraying Wendy Nelson in the NBC sitcom Needles and Pins (1973–1974). Active primarily during the 1970s and early 1980s, she also appeared in numerous television series including Emergency!, Police Woman, and The Waltons. She is the mother of actress Samantha Sloyan.

== Early life and education ==
Lenihan spent much of her childhood in Greenwich Village, New York City, while also spending summers with relatives in the Atlanta, Georgia area.

She attended P.S. 41 in Greenwich Village before graduating from Friends Seminary. She later studied at St. John's College in Annapolis, Maryland, where she pursued a classical education including Greek, Latin, philosophy, mathematics and history.

Following college, Lenihan studied dress design at the Fashion Institute of Technology and worked in the costume department at Joseph Papp's New York Shakespeare Festival.

== Career ==
Lenihan initially intended to become a costume designer before turning to acting after working at the New York Shakespeare Festival.

She appeared in off-Broadway productions from an early age and later understudied in the Broadway production Fighting Cock.

Her first screen role was in the 1972 film Glass Houses, which led to further auditions with Screen Gems.

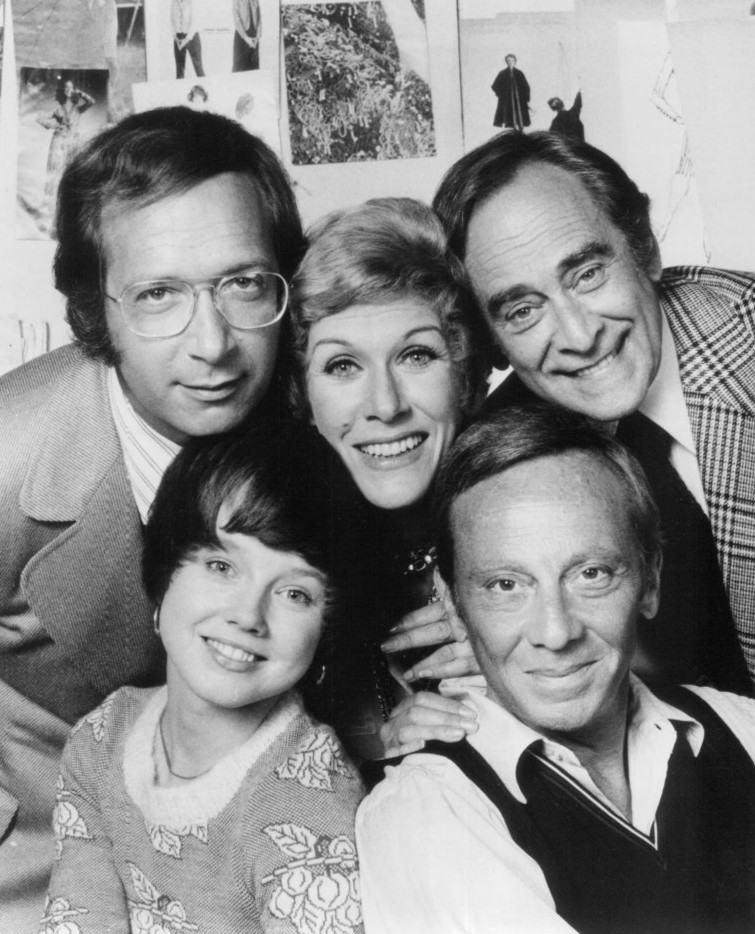
Cast of NBC series Needles and Pins, 1973. Bottom, from left: Lehinan, Norman Fell. Top, from left: Bernie Kopell, Sandra Deel, and Louis Nye.

After unsuccessfully auditioning for the CBS sitcom Bridget Loves Bernie, Screen Gems casting director Renee Valente later selected Lenihan for the role of Wendy Nelson in NBC's Needles and Pins. The show premiered in September 1973. Lenihan portrayed Wendy Nelson, a young aspiring fashion designer working in New York City's garment district alongside characters played by Norman Fell and Louis Nye.

Although the series was short-lived, Lenihan received extensive attention in the American press during its launch. Television columnist Dick Kleiner described her as a candidate for television's "season's prime discovery", while Dan Lewis noted that NBC executives regarded her as a promising newcomer.

Following Needles and Pins, Lenihan made guest appearances in numerous television series, including Emergency!, Police Woman, The Waltons, Little House on the Prairie, Quincy, M.E., and others.

== Personal life ==
Lenihan and actor James Sloyan began dating in 1963 and became engaged five years later. They married in 1973. They have two children, including actress Samantha Sloyan.

== Filmography ==
=== Film ===
Year	Title	Role	Notes
1972	Glass Houses	Kim	Feature film

=== Television ===
Year(s)	Title	Role	Notes
1973–1974	Needles and Pins	Wendy Nelson	Main role; 14 episodes
1974–1978	The Waltons	Daisy Garner	Recurring role; 6 episodes
1974–1977	Police Woman	Linda Hoffman; Alessandra; Joanne McCormack	4 episodes
1975	Cannon	Dana Longman	1 episode
1975	The Streets of San Francisco	Nancy Price	1 episode
1975	Medical Story	Dr. Beverly	1 episode
1978–1979	Emergency!	Laurie Campbell; Doctor of the Rampart Triage Team	3 episodes
1980	From Here to Eternity	Nurse	1 episode
1980	Lou Grant	Deirdre	1 episode
