= She's Leaving Home (Grey's Anatomy) =

- Grey's Anatomy episodes
- Meredith Grey (Ellen Pompeo) and Cristina Yang (played by a body double) at Derek Shepherd's (Patrick Dempsey) funeral. Sandra Oh did not return for the scene, because she had departed from the series in the Season 10 finale.
- Episode nos.: Season 11; Episodes 22/23
- Directed by: Chris Hayden
- Written by: Stacy McKee
- Original air date: April 30, 2015
- Running time: 81 minutes

Guest appearances
- Kate Burton as Ellis Grey; Debbie Allen as Catherine Avery; Kevin Alejandro as Dan Pruitt; Nicole Sullivan as JJ; Elizabeth Ann Bennett as Anne Chambers

Episode chronology
← Previous "How to Save a Life"	Next → "Time Stops"
- Grey's Anatomy season 11

"She's Leaving Home" is the 22nd and 23rd episode of the eleventh season of the American television medical drama Grey's Anatomy and the show's 242nd and 243rd episode overall. Written by Stacy McKee and directed by Chris Hayden, the two-hour episode aired on the American Broadcasting Company (ABC) in the United States on April 30, 2015.

In the episode, the doctors at Grey-Sloan Memorial Hospital mourn the death of their colleague and friend Derek Shepherd (Patrick Dempsey), who died in a car accident in the previous episode. Meredith Grey (Ellen Pompeo), Derek's widow and the show's protagonist, struggles to cope with her loss. The episode follows Meredith as she disappears from Seattle, adjusting to life as a single mother and ultimately giving birth to her third child, Ellis Shepherd.

Although the episodes were fictionally set in Seattle, Washington, filming took place in Los Angeles, California. The episodes serve as a tribute to Derek Shepherd, marking the end of Dempsey's tenure as a series regular.

Upon its original broadcast, "She's Leaving Home" was watched by 8.74 million viewers in the United States, ranking #2 in its time-slot, and earned a 2.6 Nielsen rating in the 18–49 demographic. The episode received positive reviews from television critics, with Pompeo's performance receiving widespread praise; however, criticism was directed towards the writing for its lack of focus on Derek's death.

== Plot ==
The episode opens with a voice-over narration from Ellis Grey (Kate Burton) and Meredith Grey (Ellen Pompeo) about choosing to let go of the past and embracing a fresh start.

Meredith returns to Grey Sloan Memorial to break the news of Derek Shepherd's (Patrick Dempsey) death. While most of the doctors mourn, Amelia Shepherd (Caterina Scorsone) hides her grief behind morbid jokes, unsettling her colleagues. After Derek's funeral, Meredith goes missing, leaving behind only a note saying she and her kids are fine.

Miranda Bailey (Chandra Wilson) and Ben Warren (Jason George) argue over end of life care—Bailey wants to be let go, while Ben wants every effort made to save him. Meanwhile, Richard Webber (James Pickens Jr.) plans to propose to Catherine Avery (Debbie Allen), but she rejects him before he gets the chance. Dan (Kevin Alejandro), Callie's ex-date and police chief, returns to the hospital as a patient, creating awkward tension.

Owen Hunt (Kevin McKidd) and April Kepner (Sarah Drew) head overseas for a military training program, but April extends her stay despite Jackson Avery's (Jesse Williams) pleas for her to return. Almost a year later, Alex gets a call from Meredith, revealing she is safe but pregnant, something only she knows.

Back in Seattle, Callie continues to treat Dan, fitting him with a robotic limb she and Derek developed. Amelia has a breakdown, almost relapsing into drug use, but Owen helps her confront her grief without resorting to drugs. On Valentine's Day, Ben changes his mind about life support, showing Bailey he wants the same as her now.

April surprises Jackson by returning home unexpectedly, and Catherine proposes to Richard at the hospital, and he passionately accepts.

Meredith begins to bleed and instructs Zola to call 911, mirroring her mother, Ellis' (Kate Burton) story. Meredith gives birth to a healthy baby girl, Ellis, and is surprised to see Alex at the hospital, as she had listed him as her emergency contact. They return to Seattle, where Meredith decides it's time to move forward and start fresh.

== Release ==
"She's Leaving Home" was originally broadcast on April 23, 2015, in the United States on the American Broadcasting Company (ABC). The episode attracted 8.74 million viewers, marking a slight decline from the previous episode’s 9.55 million. In the key 18–49 demographic, it scored a 2.6 Nielsen rating, representing a 7 percent decrease from the prior episode's 2.8. Despite this drop, the episode was the second-highest rated since the mid-season premiere in both total viewership and the 18–49 demographic.

In the 8:00 PM time slot, the episode ranked as the second most-watched show, outperforming Bones, The Vampire Diaries, The Odd Couple, and a rerun of The Blacklist, though it was outpaced by The Big Bang Theory. In the 9:00 PM slot, it was the top-rated show, surpassing Mom, The Blacklist, Backstrom and Reign.

The 8.74 million viewers marked an 8 percent decline from the previous episode, and the 2.6 Nielsen rating in the 18–49 demographic also reflected a 7 percent decrease. Nevertheless, the episode was the week's highest-rated drama and the third-highest rated scripted series in the 18–49 demographic, trailing only CBS's The Big Bang Theory (3.4) and ABC's Modern Family (2.9).

== Reception ==
"She's Leaving Home" received positive reviews from television critics, with Ellen Pompeo's performance as Meredith Grey receiving widespread praise; however, criticism was directed towards the writing for its lack of focus on Derek Shepherd's (Patrick Dempsey) death.

Entertainment Weekly criticized the lack of screen time for Pompeo and the limited emphasis on Derek's death, stating, "The two-hour episode very rarely touched on Derek—actually, it rarely touched on anything of great importance—hell, we barely saw Meredith." However, acknowledging Pompeo's absence, the site wrote, "I get that her absence helped make the episode's conclusion stronger. Meredith's quiet examination of Derek's belongings powerfully describes his absence and explains why she had to leave, but still: Could we have gotten just a little more time with her?" Summing up the episode, Entertainment Weekly concluded, "Like the episode before it, this one wasn't particularly good. It was unevenly paced and didn't focus enough on the parts that truly mattered. But when it succeeded, it really succeeded: Amelia Shepherd's (Caterina Scorsone) scene with Owen Hunt (Kevin McKidd) and Meredith's homecoming were both examples of Grey's at its honest, raw best. They weren't enough to make up for Derek's departure—but then again, is anything enough to make up for that?"

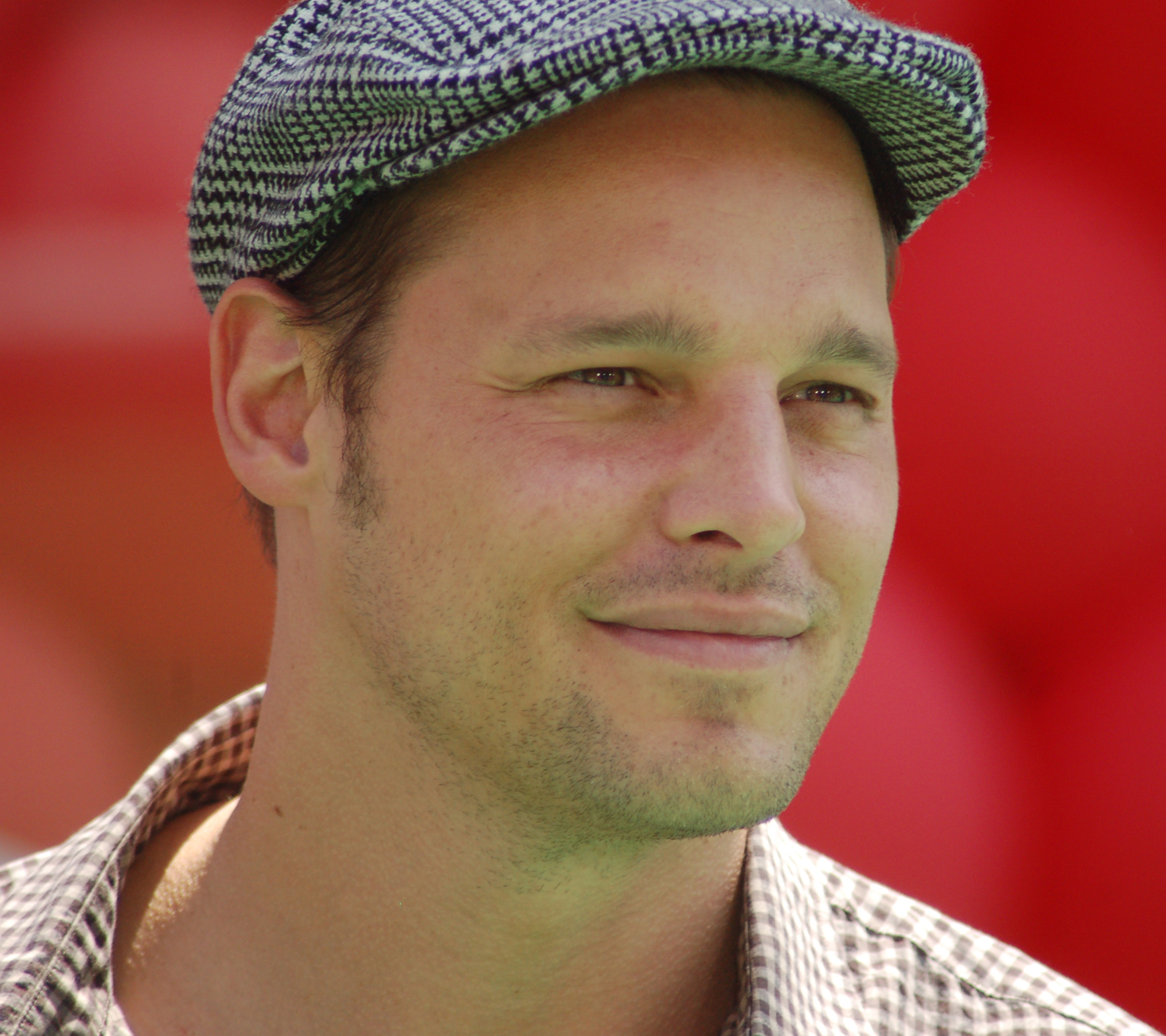
The development of Justin Chambers' character was praised by the critics.

TV Equals gave a mixed review of the episode, stating, "The episode was definitely a mixed bag for me. I'm still not sure how I feel about last night's two-hour farewell," and criticized the lack of screen time for Derek's funeral: "You know what we did not get a lot of? Outward acts of mourning or grieving. Had this been a typical hour-long episode, the very minimal time spent on Derek's funeral or hearing Derek's loved ones and colleagues reflect on his life is much more noticeable." The site added, "The subplot with the women in the burn unit was an unexpected, yet pleasant surprise. It was a much more natural extension of the episode's theme of not choosing to be alone. The writers were clearly trying to do the same with Richard and Catherine, but the material with the women in the burn unit was much more heartfelt." The review praised Justin Chambers' (Alex Karev) performance, noting, "I liked Alex's determination to be Meredith's 'person,' and Meredith finally welcoming him back into her life when she gave birth to Ellis. The more I see them interact, the more I love the dynamic between Alex and Maggie Pierce (Kelly McCreary)."

The site also commended Sara Ramirez's (Callie Torres) performance, writing, "Callie's reflection on Derek's life and contributions was probably the most satisfying of all the doctors. Callie's tears and comments about Derek were what finally brought on the waterworks for me. Ramirez nailed it." TVOverMind also praised Chambers' character development: "Alex and Jo Wilson (Camilla Luddington) are still going strong, and their house becomes home base for the tight-knit group of doctors, just like during Alex and Meredith's intern days. Getting on with his life doesn't stop Alex from worrying about his best friend, and he doesn't stop calling Meredith every day for months."

Ashley Bissette Sumerel of TV Fanatic provided a mixed-to-positive review, highly praising Pompeo's performance: "The episode manages to be both incredibly poignant and emotional, yet a little disappointing at the same time." She added, "Something I've appreciated about Grey's Anatomy Season 11 is the way it has brought focus back to Meredith's character." Sumerel also praised Scorsone's performance, stating, "Kudos, as usual, to Scorsone for portraying such difficult emotions in such a raw way," but criticized the lack of focus on Derek's death: "The male lead of a show that has been on for 11 seasons has been killed off, yet a large amount of time is spent focused on other things. This episode simply tries to do too much. And that's saying a lot, given that it's two hours long."

BroadwayWorld strongly criticized the episode, stating, "Seeing Meredith sleep in that big, empty bed alone is a powerful enough image. They could've taken us through the grief in a much neater way. This could have been a brilliantly emotional hour of television. Instead, we got two hours of useless elements that dragged on." The site also commented on the decline in quality of the show, adding, "This is not the same show it once was."

Us Weekly echoed fan sentiments, noting that viewers "particularly took issue with Derek's funeral, which lasted a mere 10 minutes. Meredith was barely around in the first hour, and it went from Easter to Christmas in a matter of 30 minutes." However, the site acknowledged the episode's emotional impact, adding, "As for some of the episode's better moments? Grey's fans were moved (aka cried uncontrollably) by everyone's reaction to Derek's tragic death."
