= Louis Nye =

American comedic actor (1913–2005)

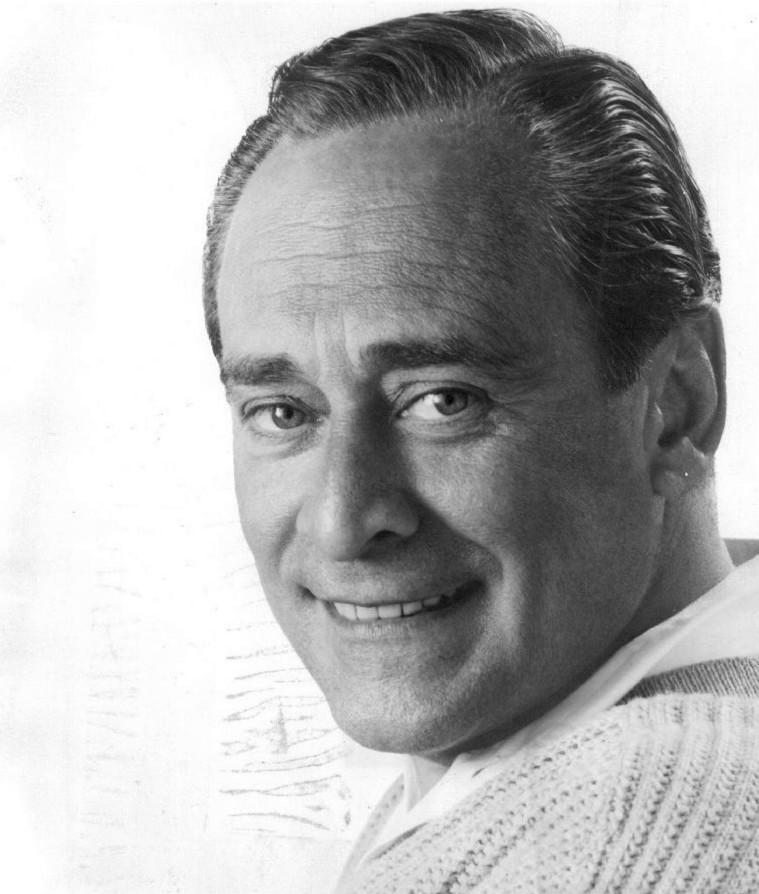
- Nye in 1966
- Born: Louis Neistat; May 1, 1913; Hartford, Connecticut, US
- Died: October 9, 2005 (aged 92); Los Angeles, California, US
- Resting place: Hillside Memorial Park, Culver City, California
- Occupation: Actor
- Years active: 1950–2005
- Spouse: Anita Leonard
- Children: 1
- Relatives: Casey Neistat (great-nephew), Van Neistat (great-nephew)

Louis Nye (May 1, 1913 – October 9, 2005) was an American comedic actor. He is best known for his work on multiple television, film and radio programs.

== Radio and television ==
Nye met Carl Reiner when both were in the US Army Special Services in the Pacific theatre of operations where they entertained troops during World War II.

After the war he returned to New York and began working in live television. He also appeared in several plays on Broadway, and made many appearances on television variety shows such as The Jack Benny Program (including one memorable turn as a crying cab driver), The Jimmy Durante Show, The Pat Boone Chevy Showroom and The Victor Borge Show.

He earned his greatest fame as a regular on The Steve Allen Show, performing with Allen, Don Knotts, Tom Poston, Pat Harrington Jr., Dayton Allen, Gabriel Dell and Bill Dana. He primarily played urbane, wealthy, and often fey bon vivants; as part of the weekly "Man on the Street" sketches, his characterization of the pretentious country-club braggart Gordon Hathaway, with his catchphrase, "Hi-ho, Steverino," plus Allen's inability to resist bursting into hysterical laughter at his ad-libs, made Nye one of the favorites on Allen's show. When production moved to Los Angeles, Nye went too and became a character actor in Hollywood.

Nye was cast as a guest star on many television series, including Make Room for Daddy; Guestward, Ho!; Burke's Law; The Munsters; Love, American Style; Laverne & Shirley; Starsky and Hutch; Police Woman; Fantasy Island; St. Elsewhere; and The Cosby Show.

Nye played dentist Delbert Gray on several episodes of The Ann Sothern Show from 1960 to 1961, the romantic interest of Olive Smith, played by Ann Tyrrell (1909–1983). Nye also played Sonny Drysdale, the spoiled rich stepson of Milburn Drysdale on The Beverly Hillbillies during the 1962 season. He did six episodes, and received more mail than from anything else he had ever done on television, but the character was dropped. It was rumored that someone in the CBS network, or a sponsor, thought Sonny was too "sissified". However, Nye revived the character briefly during the 1966 season. During this period, Nye appeared in several television commercials for various products, including Rath brand lunch meats and the Better Business Bureau.

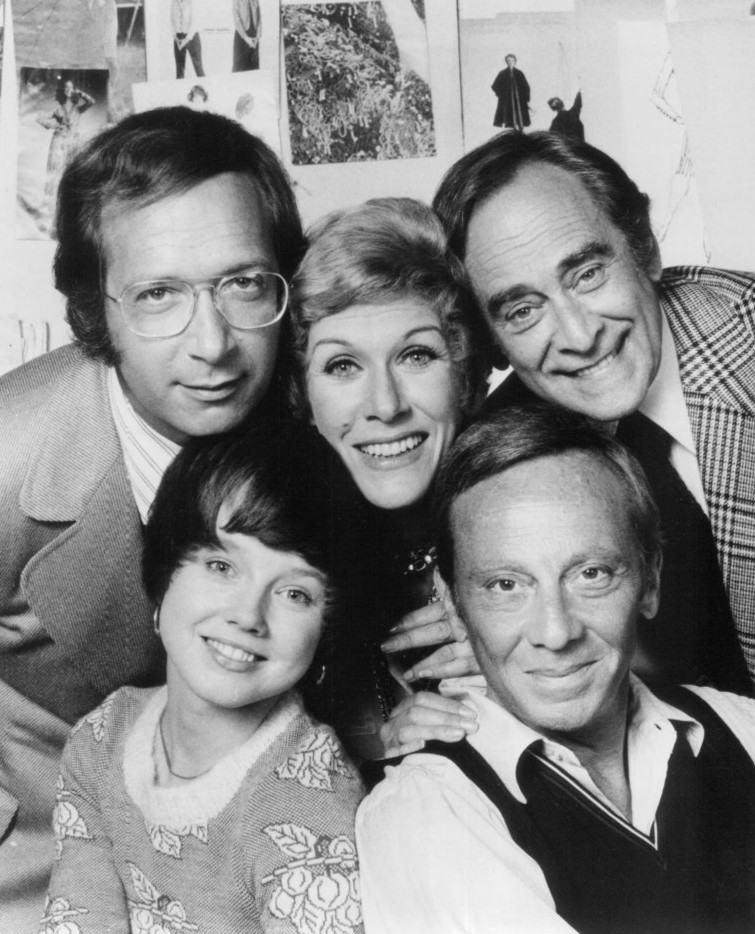
Needles and Pins cast, 1973. Bottom, from left: Deirdre Lenihan, Norman Fell. Top, from left: Bernie Kopell, Sandra Deel and Nye.

Nye was a member of the cast of Needles and Pins, playing Harry Karp. The sitcom, which starred Norman Fell, ran for 14 episodes in the autumn of 1973.

Nye appeared as a celebrity judge on The Gong Show during the late 1970s. He also recorded a few comedy LPs, doing a variety of characterizations. Unfortunately, he never had the opportunity to reach his potential in movies. Many of his character roles were little more than cameos. Nevertheless, he performed with Lucille Ball, Bob Hope, Jack Lemmon, Dean Martin, Walter Matthau, Robert Mitchum, Jack Webb and Joanne Woodward, and others. Nye also appeared on the lecture circuit, in concerts and in nightclubs, and did voice work in animation, such as Inspector Gadget with Don Adams.

== Last years and death ==
Nye never retired. He completed a 24-city tour of the country for Columbia Artists, ending the tour with a two-week stint at the Sahara in Las Vegas. At age 92, he continued to work, appearing in his recurring role of Jeff Greene's father on HBO's Curb Your Enthusiasm from 2000 to 2005.

Nye lived in Pacific Palisades, California, with his wife, pianist-songwriter Anita Leonard, who wrote the standard, "A Sunday Kind of Love." Married since the late 1940s, they had a son, artist Peter Nye. Nye was also the great-uncle of filmmakers Casey Neistat, Van Neistat and stuntman Dean Neistat.

Nye died of lung cancer October 9, 2005, and was cremated. His ashes are interred at Hillside Memorial Park Cemetery in Culver City, California.

== Selected filmography ==
Year	Title	Role	Notes
1960	Sex Kittens Go to College	Dr. Zorch	
1960	The Facts of Life	Hamilton Busbee	
1961	The Last Time I Saw Archie	Private Sam Beacham	
1962	Zotz!	Hugh Fundy	
1962	Beverly Hillbillies	Sonny Drysdale	4 episodes
1963	The Stripper	Ronnie	
1963	The Wheeler Dealers	Stanislaus	
1963	Who's Been Sleeping in My Bed?	Harry Tobler	
1964	Good Neighbor Sam	Det. Reinhold Shiffner	
1966	The Munsters	Zombo	
1967	A Guide for the Married Man	Irving	
1976	Won Ton Ton, the Dog Who Saved Hollywood	Radio Announcer	
1977	Charge of the Model T's	Friedrich Schmidt	
1978	Harper Valley PTA	Kirby Baker	
1981	Full Moon High	Minister	
1981	The Reluctant Dragon	St. George	
1984	Cannonball Run II	Fisherman #3	
1985	Alice in Wonderland	the Carpenter	
1987	O.C. and Stiggs	Garth Sloan	
1987	The Cosby Show	Norman Kirby	
