= Elizabeth Ann Bennett =

American actress

- Occupation: Actress
- Years active: 1999–present

Elizabeth Ann Bennett is an American actress.

== Filmography ==
=== Film ===
Year	Title	Role	Notes
1999	Liberty Heights	Mary	
2006	Soul's Midnight	Alicia Milford	
2006	Military Intelligence and You!	Lt. Monica Tasty	
2008	Kung Fu Panda: Secrets of the Furious Five	Bunny, Ant	Voice, Direct-to-Video
2011	The Passing	Holly	
2013	The Ultimate Life	Hanna Stevens	
2017	Odious	Karen	

=== Television ===
Year	Title	Role	Notes
2001	One Life to Live	Amber	Guest role (3 episodes)
2002	The Dead Zone	Young Abigail Travers (1945)	"Enigma"
2003	Dragnet	Keri Toft	"The Big Ruckus"
2003	Happy Family	Jeannie	Guest role
2004	Helter Skelter	Abigail Folger	TV film
2005	Passions	Veronica	Guest role (3 episodes)
2005	CSI: NY	Regina Bowen	"Summer in the City", "Grand Murder at the Central Station"
2005	NCIS	Carla Johnson	"Frame Up"
2005–06	Point Pleasant	Holly	Recurring role
2007	The Wedding Bells	Skippie Powell	"Fools in Love"
2008–09	Heroes	Sue Landers	"Our Father", "Acceptance"
2009	CSI: Miami	Teresa Vance	"Smoke Gets in Your CSIs"
2009	Castle	Ruth	"Home Is Where the Heart Stops"
2011	Bird Dog	Ginger Cotts	TV film
2012	Matchmaker Santa	Blaire	TV film
2013	Days of Our Lives	Mother	Guest role (3 episodes)
2014	Bones	Mallory Briggs	"The High in the Low"
2014	The Young and the Restless	Alicia	Guest role (3 episodes)
2014	Taken Away	Debbie	TV film
2014–15	The Last Ship	Rachel's Mom	"Trials", "Friendly Fire"
2015	Grey's Anatomy	Anne Chambers	"She's Leaving Home: Parts 1 & 2"
