= Needles and Pins (TV series) =

- Title card
- Genre: Sitcom
- Created by: Adele Styler; Burt Styler
- Starring: Norman Fell; Bernie Kopell; Deirdre Lenihan
- Country of origin: United States
- Original language: English
- No. of seasons: 1
- No. of episodes: 14 (4 unaired)

Production
- Executive producer: David Gerber
- Running time: 30 minutes
- Production company: Screen Gems

Original release
- Network: NBC
- Release: September 21 – December 28, 1973

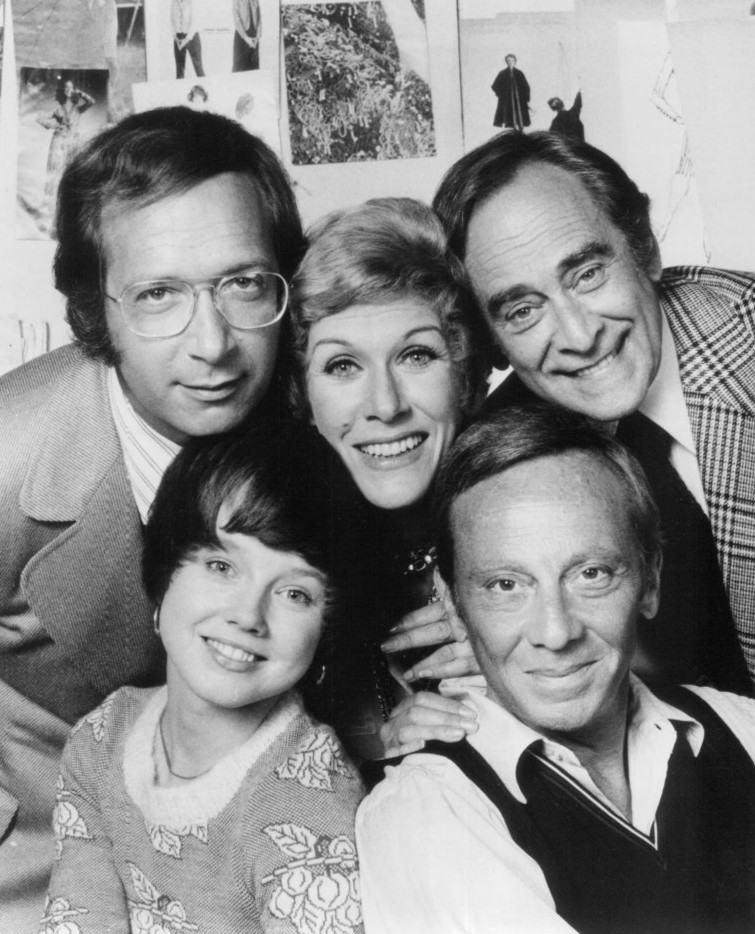
The cast. Bottom, from left: Deirdre Lenihan, Norman Fell. Top, from left: Bernie Kopell, Sandra Deel, Louis Nye.

Needles and Pins is an American sitcom about a women's clothing manufacturer and his employees in New York City that aired from September 21, 1973, to December 28, 1973.

== Cast ==
- Norman Fell as Nathan Davidson
- Louis Nye as Harry Karp
- Deirdre Lenihan as Wendy Nelson
- Sandra Deel as Sonia Baker
- Bernie Kopell as Charlie Miller
- Larry Gelman as Max Popkin
- Alex Henteloff as Myron Russo
- Milton Selzer as Julius Singer

== Synopsis ==
Nathan Davidson is the owner of Lorelei Fashion House, a manufacturer of women's clothing located in New York City's Garment District. His business partner is his dilettante brother-in-law, Harry Karp. Wendy Nelson, the daughter of a friend of Nathan's, has just moved to New York City from Nebraska and taken a job with Lorelei as a fashion designer; she must adjust to the hectic pace of life in New York City in general and in the fashion industry in particular. Also working at Lorelei are Sonia Baker, the bookkeeper and secretary; Charlie Miller, the salesman; Max Popkin, the fabric cutter; and Myron Russo, the patternmaker. Julius Singer, Nathan's archenemy, runs another fashion company that is Lorelei's chief competitor.

== Production notes ==
Deirdre Lenihan was a newcomer to television, and Needles and Pins gave her a prominent role in which to showcase her talents; her appearance during the opening credits is twice as long as that of any other featured character. Episode directors were Hy Averback, Peter Baldwin, George Tyne, and Ernest Losso.

== Broadcast history ==
Needles and Pins aired on NBC on Friday at 9:00 pm Eastern Time throughout its run. It premiered on September 21, 1973, and its last episode aired on December 28, 1973.

== Episodes ==
Sources list 14 Needles and Pins episodes. Ten of them aired in 1973. Apparently, the remaining four copyrighted in early 1974 after the show's last telecast were never broadcast.

Season #	Episode #	Title	Plot/Notes	Original air date
1	1	"The Girl from 7th Avenue"	Wendy, certain that she is talented enough to become a famous fashion designer, arrives in New York City from Nebraska and visits Lorelei to get a feel for the fashion industry; mistaken for a fashion model, she sells 600 copies of a dress she tries on, and Nathan hires her. During Wendy's first day on the job, Nathan must get rid of 3,000 yards of gingham that Harry bought by mistake, and decides to pass it off to Julius as the latest trend so that Julius will buy it.	September 21, 1973
1	2	"The Spy Who Came in on a Hanger"	Julius's company produces one of Lorelei's dress designs, and an angry and suspicious Nathan wants to know who sold the dress to him.	September 28, 1973
1	3	"It Was a Very Good Line"	Nathan falls for a glamorous new fashion designer and fails to notice that her business ideas and work habits are bankrupting his company. Barbara Perry and Rhonda Fleming guest-star.	October 5, 1973
1	4	"Do Your Own Thing"	Wanting an heir to one day take over the Lorelei company, Nathan pressures his nephew to join the fashion industry – but the young man would rather study Oriental philosophy and has no interest in or talent for the fashion business. Danny Goldman and Michael Margotta guest-star.	October 26, 1973
1	5	"The Break-Up"	Harry decides to leave Lorelei to become a show business producer, and Nathan looks forward to Harry's departure so that he can run the business without having to deal with Harry's incompetence.	November 2, 1973
1	6	"Union Trouble"	After Nathan lets the non-union Wendy use a company sewing machine to sew dresses, Lorelei's outraged union employees go on strike. Harold Gould, Murray Hamilton, Virginia Paris, Penny Santon, Gina Alvarado, and Joshua Shelley guest-star.	November 9, 1973
1	7	"The Endangered Species"	One of Lorelei's wealthy clients wants to marry Charlie and pursues him aggressively. Nita Talbot guest-stars.	November 23, 1973
1	8	"The Wife You Save May Be Your Own"	Harry's strong-willed wife Eleanor finds her independence and wants freedom – and a divorce. Joan Rivers guest stars as Eleanor Karp.	December 7, 1973
1	9	"The Great Blizzard"	A blizzard strikes New York City, trapping the Lorelei staff with their archenemy Julius.	December 21, 1973
1	10	"A Woman Has a Right"	Sonia finally finds love and plans to move away – with a married man.	December 28, 1973
1	11	"King for a Day"	?	Never (copyrighted January 11, 1974)
1	12	"No Way to Treat a Relative"	Nathan's father disrupts Lorelei's operations with his muddled efforts to help out. David Opatoshu guest-stars.	Never (copyrighted January 18, 1974)
1	13	"With Such Enemies"	?	Never (copyrighted January 25, 1974)
1	14	"Charlie's Ego Trip"	?	Never (copyrighted February 1, 1974)
