= Area 407 =

- Directed by: Dale Fabrigar; Everette Wallin
- Written by: Robert Shepyer
- Produced by: Matt Allen; Mitch Dickman; Michael Haskins
- Starring: Samantha Lester; James Lyons; Melanie Lyons; Abigail Schrader
- Cinematography: Bryan Olinger
- Edited by: Hunter Hill
- Music by: Matt Dahan
- Production companies: Suzanne DeLaurentiis Productions; Cloud Nine Pictures; Entertainment Factory
- Distributed by: IFC Midnight
- Release date: 27 April 2012
- Running time: 90 minutes
- Country: United States
- Language: English

Area 407 (originally titled Tape 407: The Mesa Reserve Incident) is a 2012 American found footage horror film directed by Dale Fabrigar and Everette Wallin, starring Samantha Lester, James Lyons, Melanie Lyons and Abigail Schrader.

== Plot ==
The story follows two sisters, Jessie and Trish, who are flying from New York to Los Angeles on New Year's Eve. During the flight, the plane encounters severe turbulence and crashes in a remote area. The survivors soon realize they have landed within a secret government testing zone and are being hunted by unknown predators. The film is presented through the lens of a handheld camera, capturing the escalating tension and fear as the group struggles to survive the night. As they seek shelter and attempt to evade the unseen threats, the survivors face internal conflicts and the realization that help may not be coming.

== Cast ==
- Samantha Lester as Jessie
- James Lyons as Jimmy
- Melanie Lyons as Laura Hawkins
- Abigail Schrader as Trish
- Samantha Sloyan as Lois
- Brendan Patrick Connor as Charlie
- Ken Garcia as Charlie

== Release ==
On April 18, 2012, IFC Midnight acquired distribution rights to the film for North and Latin America, France, the Benelux, Greece, Central and Eastern Europe, Turkey and Asia, releasing it on video on demand on 27 April.

== Reception ==
William Goss of Film.com gave the film a rating of "D" and wrote "For some reason, the motivation of panic seems like a consistent rationale for ensemble hysteria in low-budget films like these, and I’d be able to forgive it all -- well, most of it -- if Area 407 had actually made with some effective frights or a more inventive mythology rather than amateurishly cashing in on this trend of handheld hokum." Jinx of Dread Central gave the film a rating of 1.5 out of 5 and wrote, "As a traditionally shot narrative feature, this movie would’ve been terrible. As a found footage flick? It’s punishment."

The film received a positive review in HorrorNews.net.
