= Bernie Kopell =

American actor (born 1933)

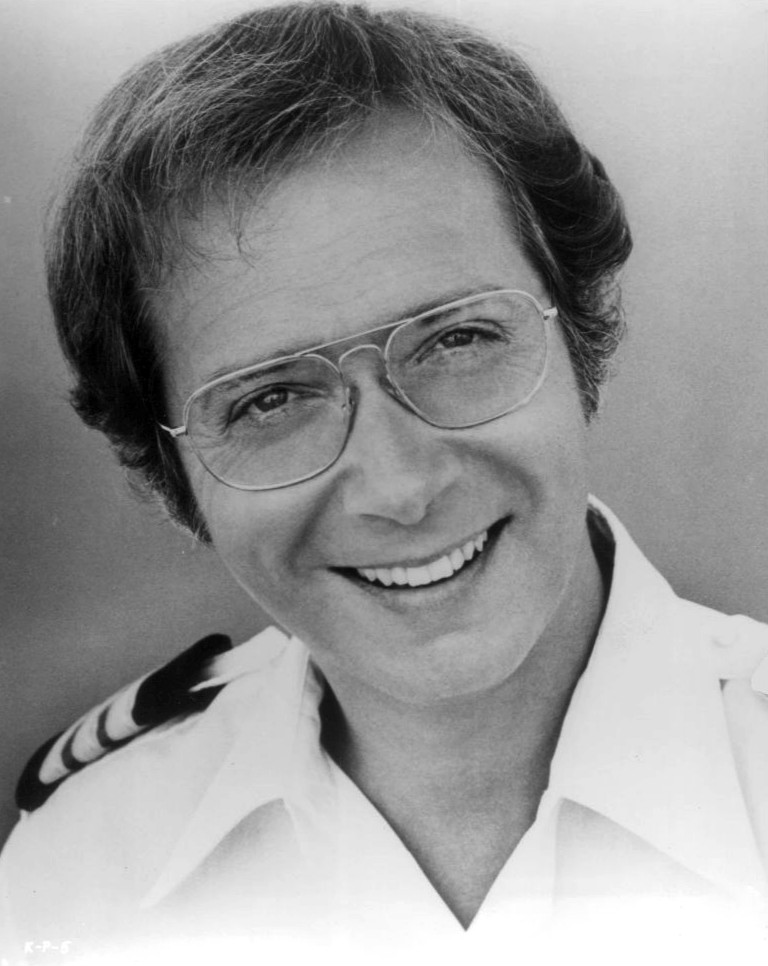
- Kopell as Dr. Adam Bricker in The Love Boat , 1977
- Born: Bernard Morton Kopell; June 21, 1933 (age 93); Brooklyn, New York, U.S.
- Education: New York University (BFA)
- Occupation: Actor
- Years active: 1961–present
- Known for: Siegfried – Get Smart; Dr. Adam Bricker – The Love Boat
- Spouse(s): Celia Whitney (m. 1962; div. 1963) Yolanda Veloz (m. 1974; div. 1995) Catrina Honadle (m. 1997)
- Children: 2
- Military service
- Allegiance: United States
- Branch: United States Navy
- Years: 1955–1957
- Rank: Seaman

Bernard Morton Kopell (born June 21, 1933) is an American character actor notable for his roles as Siegfried in Get Smart from 1966 to 1969 and as Dr. Adam Bricker ("Doc") on The Love Boat from 1977 to 1986.

== Early life ==
Kopell was born in Brooklyn, New York, the son of Jewish parents Pauline (née Taran) and Al Bernard Kopell. Kopell attended Erasmus Hall High School in Brooklyn before enrolling at New York University, majoring in dramatic arts and graduating with a Bachelor of Fine Arts in 1955.

While fulfilling his military service, he served as a librarian at Naval Air Station, Norfolk, Virginia, and then between 1956 and 1957 on board the battleship USS Iowa (BB-61).

During his time on the USS Iowa, he travelled extensively to Europe in Italy, Spain, Greece, the Middle East in Turkey as well as to South America. He also taught the GED prep course to other military personnel. After completing active duty, Kopell returned to New York before going to Los Angeles with the promise of an agent by fellow graduate James Drury.

== Career ==
In Los Angeles, Kopell initially drove a taxi and tried to sell Kirby vacuum cleaners to make ends meet before being cast in a minor role in The Brighter Day, a daytime soap aired on CBS. From there, he moved on to appear in My Favorite Martian and The Jack Benny Program impersonating Latino characters, eventually managing to branch out and do other accents.

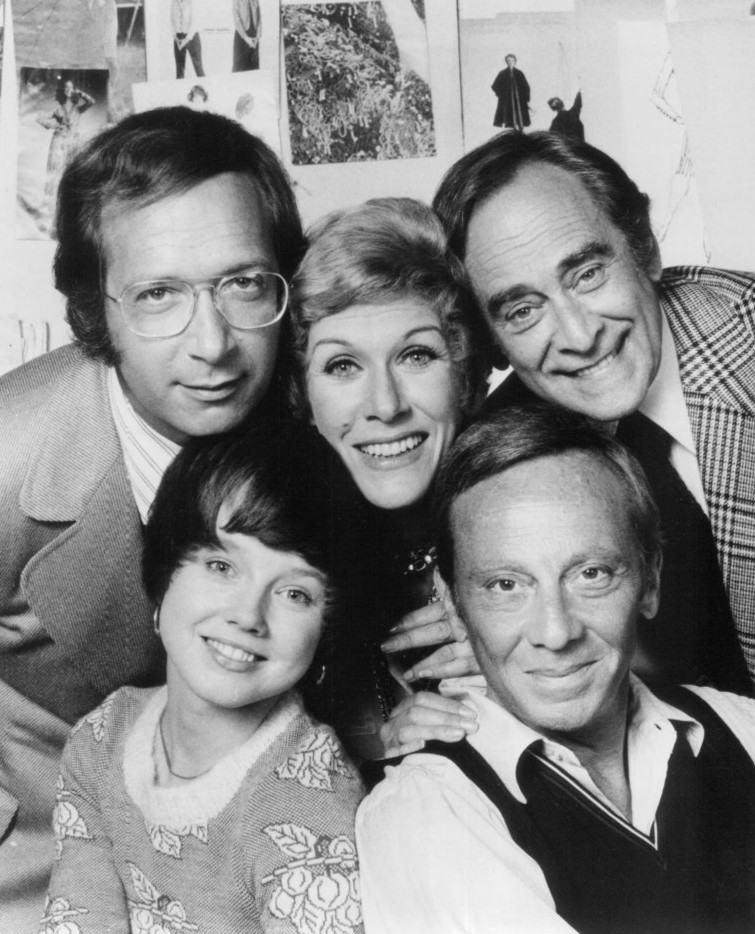
Cast of NBC series Needles and Pins, 1973. Bottom, from left: Deirdre Lenihan, Norman Fell. Top, from left: Kopell, Sandra Deel and Louis Nye.

During the 1960s and early 1970s, Kopell appeared in many television series, often sitcoms, including Ripcord, That Girl, The Jack Benny Program, Our Man Higgins, Green Acres, The Danny Thomas Show, Ben Casey, The Flying Nun, Needles and Pins, McHale's Navy, Kolchak: The Night Stalker, The Sonny and Cher Show, Lancelot Link, Secret Chimp, Petticoat Junction, The Streets of San Francisco, Room 222, The Mary Tyler Moore Show, The Dick Van Dyke Show, Bewitched, The Odd Couple and Kojak.

However, Kopell's longest-running role was as Dr. Adam Bricker on The Love Boat, an Aaron Spelling production. He remained on the series during its entire run, appearing in 250 episodes.

=== Siegfried and other roles ===
Kopell made recurring appearances as KAOS agent Siegfried in Get Smart, Jerry Bauman in That Girl and Louie Pallucci in The Doris Day Show. He played several characters on Bewitched, including the witches' apothecary and the hippie warlock Alonzo in the episode "The Warlock in the Gray Flannel Suit". He played Charlie Miller as a member of the cast of the situation comedy Needles and Pins, which ran for 14 episodes in the autumn of 1973. He portrayed a plastic surgeon who gave Ed Brown a facelift on Chico and the Man. In 1975, he was Alan-A-Dale in the Robin Hood parody When Things Were Rotten.

Earlier in his career, he played a director in an episode of Alfred Hitchcock Presents ("Good-Bye George"). About this same time, he guest starred on the short-lived The New Phil Silvers Show.

=== Later work ===
Kopell's role as Doc on The Love Boat was parodied in a humorous appearance on Late Show with David Letterman in 1995. Two entries in that night's Top Ten List poked fun at The Love Boat, and at the Doc character specifically. The camera cut to Kopell, who was sitting in the audience, and he stormed out of the theater. A few moments later, he was shown having been re-seated in the mezzanine when the second parody was made at his expense, and again stood up, raised his fists and stormed out, playing along with the host. In a dream sequence of The Fresh Prince of Bel-Air, Kopell made a parody cameo as an actor who played a ship's doctor so many times he offers to perform an operation for real, while in a 1994 episode of Saturday Night Live he appeared as Doc during a Love Boat–themed spoof of Star Trek: The Next Generation. In the 1990s, Kopell traded on his Doc Bricker persona when he appeared in a commercial for an anti-snoring product named D-Snore, in which he noted that loud snoring "can even ruin a romantic cruise."

Kopell appears as a coroner in "Which Prue Is It Anyway", an episode of Charmed. Kopell appears in the Monk episode "Mr. Monk and the Critic", playing Mr. Gilson, the ill-fated restroom attendant, whom Monk referred to as the Michelangelo of lavatories. He guest starred in "Pinky", a 2009 episode of My Name Is Earl. He made a cameo as a patient in the Scrubs episode "My Friend the Doctor", as well as an episode of The Suite Life of Zack & Cody.

Beginning in August 2022, Kopell co-starred with Hal Linden in Two Jews Talking off-Broadway at the Theater at St Clement's. He played his final performance on October 16.

As of 2023, he still appeared regularly in film and television productions.

== Personal life ==
Kopell has been married three times, first to actress Celia Whitney, then actress Yolanda Veloz, before marrying Catrina Honadle in 1997. Kopell and Honadle have two children together, Adam (born 1998) and Josh (born 2003).

== Filmography ==
=== Film ===
Year	Title	Role	Notes
1963	The Man from the Diners' Club	Comet Messenger	Uncredited
1963	The Thrill of It All	Commercial Director	Uncredited
1963	The Wheeler Dealers	Fawning Art Fan	Uncredited
1964	Good Neighbor Sam	Richard Taragon	Uncredited
1965	The Loved One	Assistant to the Guru Brahmin	
1966	Death of a Salesman	Howard	
1972	Wild in the Sky	Penrat	
1976	The Love Boat	Dr. Adam Bricker	
1976	Flo's Place	Hoffman	
1976	Bound for Glory	Baker – Woody's Agent	Uncredited
1977	The Love Boat II	Dr. O'Neill	
1978	A Guide for the Married Woman	Bill	
1985	Half Nelson		Pilot episode
1986	Combat High	Mr. Mendelsson	
1989	Get Smart, Again	Conrad Siegfried; Professor Helmut Schmelding	
1989	The Magic Boy's Easter	Mordechai the Magician	Video short
1990	The Love Boat: A Valentine Voyage	Doc	
1992	Missing Pieces	Dr. Gutman	
1998	Bug Buster	Gil Griffin	
1998	Sunset Beach: Shockwave	Captain James Nelson	
1998	Land of the Free	TV Host	
1999	Follow Your Heart	Anthony Mason	
2002	The Stoneman	Professor Milano	
2003	Dismembered		
2003	A Light in the Forest	Artemis Schnell	
2004	Miss Cast Away and the Island Girls	Officer	Uncredited
2005	The Cutter	Issac Teller	
2006	The Creature of the Sunny Side Up Trailer Park	Percy Wells	
2007	Say It in Russian	Geezer 2	
2008	Get Smart	Opel Driver	
2010	First Dog	Psychiatrist Juvenile Hall	
2018	The Last Sharknado: It's About Time	Charter Boat Captain	

=== Television ===
Year	Title	Role	Notes
1961	Whispering Smith	Roulette Game Operator (as Bernard Kopell)	Episode: "Trademark"
1962–1963	The Jack Benny Program	Banker – Mr. Harris / Alberto Rinaldi	Episode: "The Story of the New Talent Show"
1963	Ripcord	Photographer	Episode "Picture of Terror"
1963	Our Man Higgins	Finnerty	Episode: "Half a Higgins"
1963	The Alfred Hitchcock Hour	Director	Season 2 Episode 10: "Good-Bye, George"
1963	The Danny Thomas Show	George	Episode: "Shy Alfie"
1963	McHale's Navy	Colonel Pryor	Episode: "Is There a Doctor in the Hut?"
1964	The Lucy Show	Interne	Episode: "Lucy Plays Florence Nightingale"
1964–1965	My Favorite Martian	George / Senor Pepe Lopez / Morton Beanbecker	3 episodes
1964	The New Phil Silvers Show	Stanislavsky	Episode: "Moonlight and Dozes"
1964	Petticoat Junction	Black Salmon	Episode: "The Umquaw Strip"
1965	The Beverly Hillbillies	Jerry Best	Episode: "The Movie Starlet"
1965	Valentine's Day		Episode: "The Title Fight"
1965	Sally and Sam	Glen	TV pilot
1965	Ben Casey	Al Banner	Episode: "What to Her Is Plato?"
1965–1966	The Farmer's Daughter	Jim Bankes / Buster Cannon	2 episodes
1966	The Dick Van Dyke Show	Juan	Episode: "Remember the Alimony"
1966	Run, Buddy, Run	Albert Overstreet	Episode: "Steam Bath & Chicken Little"
1966	Get Smart	Siegfried	Recurring character; 1966–1969
1966	That Girl	Jerry Bauman	Recurring character; 1966–1971
1966	Green Acres	James Stuart	Episode: "You Ought to Be in Pictures"
1966	The Hero	Charlie	Episode: "I Have a Friend"
1968	The Flying Nun	Dr. G. Paredes	Episode: "The Return of Father Lundigan"
1969–1972	Bewitched	Apothecary / Alonzo / Baron von Fuchs / Dr. Rhinehouse / A.J. Sylvester / Dr. H. Chomsky	9 episodes
1969	The Debbie Reynolds Show	Announcer	Episode: "In the Soup"
1970	Lancelot Link, Secret Chimp	Baron von Butcher / Creto / Wang Fu (various character voices)	17 episodes
1970–1972	Room 222	Franklin / Roger Duncan	2 episodes
1970–1971	Love, American Style	Mr. Chaney / Harry Barker / Counselor	3 episodes
1970–1973	The Doris Day Show	Louie Pallucci / Uncle August Von Kappelhoff / Major Laguinita (Doris' seatmate)	8 episodes
1971	Night Gallery	Reed	Episode: "The Boy Who Predicted Earthquakes"
1971	Funny Face	Repairman	Episode: "The Repairman Cheateth"
1971	The Chicago Teddy Bears	Rudolpho Tarantino	Episode: "Annie Get Your Cue"
1972	Ironside	George Packer	Episode: "Unreasonable Facsimile"
1972	The Odd Couple	Professor Faraday	Episode: "Psychic, Shmychic"
1972	Me and the Chimp	Arbogast	Episode: "Mike's Burglar Alarm"
1972	Insight	Willie	Episode: "Graduation Day"
1972	The New Dick Van Dyke Show	Officer Jack Jackson	Episode: "Sobriety Test"
1972	The Bob Newhart Show	Dr. Arnold	Episode: "I Want to Be Alone"
1972	The New Temperatures Rising Show	Harold Lefkowitz	Recurring character (to 1973)
1973	The Paul Lynde Show	Campbell	Episode: "Out of Bounds"
1973	Needles and Pins	Charlie Miller	Series regular
1974	The Streets of San Francisco	Arthur Ganz	Episode: "Mask of Death"
1974	McMillan & Wife	Bernini Mussolino	Episode: "Guilt by Association"
1975	Harry O	Charlie	Episode: "For the Love of Money"
1975	Kolchak: The Night Stalker	Doctor Gravanites	Episode: "The Trevi Collection" (as Bernard Kopell)
1975	The Mary Tyler Moore Show	Tony Kramer	Episode: "Ted Baxter's Famous Broadcasters' School"
1975	Hot L Baltimore	Travez	Episode: "Historic L Baltimore"
1975	The Ghost Busters	Dr. Frankenstein	Episode: "Dr. Whatsisname"
1975	The Streets of San Francisco	Dean Watson	Episode: "School of Fear"
1975	When Things Were Rotten	Alan-A-Dale	Main role
1975	Kojak	Sam Bernard	Episode: "Money Back Guarantee"
1976	Chico and the Man	Harry Stern	Episode: "The Face Job"
1976	Switch	Gaylord Henderson / Selig	2 episodes
1976	The Six Million Dollar Man	Pete Martin	Episode: "Vulture of the Andes"
1977	Alice	Burt	Episode: "The Failure"
1977	Code R	Garrison	Episode: "The Drifter"
1977–1987	The Love Boat	Doctor Adam Bricker	Main role
1978	Fantasy Island	Fred Stouton	Episode: "Trouble, My Lovely/The Common Man"
1978	Flying High	Morgan	Episode: "The Beautiful People"
1978	Greatest Heroes of the Bible	Potiphar	Episode: "Joseph in Egypt"
1979	$weepstake$	Norman Townes	Episode 1.5
1979	Supertrain	Dr. Marshall Fossberg	Episode: "Pirouette"
1979	Charlie's Angels	Doctor Adam Bricker	Episode: "Love Boat Angels"
1981	Hart to Hart	James Parquest	Episode: "Hartland Express"
1983	Fantasy Island	Carter Ransome	Episode: "The Devil Stick/Touch and Go"
1984	Legmen	Apple Dan Bonny	Episode: "The Return of Apple Dan Bonny"
1987	DuckTales	Voice work	Episode: "Spies in Their Eyes"
1987	The Charmings	Dr. Roland	Episode: "Lillian Loses Her Powers"
1987	Sledge Hammer!	Vincent Lagarski	Episode: "The Last of the Red Hot Vampires"
1987	ABC Afterschool Special	Tom	Episode: "The Day My Kid Went Punk"
1987	The New Mike Hammer		Episode: "Elegy for a Tramp" (as Bernie Koppel)
1991	Civil Wars		Episode: "A Long, Fat Frontal Presentation"
1992	The Fresh Prince of Bel-Air	Doc	Episode: "Ill Will"
1994	Saturday Night Live	Doc (uncredited)	Episode: "Patrick Stewart/Salt-N-Pepa"
1995	Get Smart	Siegfried	Episode: "Wurst Enemies"
1997	Diagnosis: Murder	Dr. Les Franklin	Episode: "Physician, Murder Thyself"
1997	Martin	Dr. Adam Bricker	Episode: "Goin' Overboard: Part 2"
1997	Boy Meets World	Himself	Episode: "Fraternity Row"
1997	Head over Heels	Himself	Episode: "Vice Guy"
1998	The Lionhearts	Voice work	Episode: "Leo's Diet"
1998	Love Boat: The Next Wave	Dr. Adam Bricker	Episode: "Reunion"
1998	Sunset Beach	Captain Nelson	4 episodes
1999	Charmed	Coroner	Episode: "Which Prue Is It Anyway?"
1999	Beverly Hills, 90210	Dr. Beldon	Episode: "Beheading St. Valentine"
2000	As Told by Ginger	Mr. Libby (voice)	Episode: "Cry Wolf"
2003	Scrubs	Mr. Moran	Episode: "My Friend the Doctor"
2006	The Suite Life of Zack & Cody	Banker – Old Guy	Episode: "Not So Suite 16"
2009	My Name Is Earl	Lake Resort Manager	Episode: "Pinky"
2009	Monk	Gilson	Episode: "Mr. Monk and the Critic"
2012–2013	See Dad Run	The Colonel / Colonel James Cunningham	2 episodes
2013	Arrested Development	Judge Kornzucker	3 episodes
2013	Hit the Floor	Mel O'Grane	Episode: "Keep Away"
2013	Raising Hope	Charles	Episode: "Ship Happens"
2014	The Comeback Kids	Jim	Episode: "Richie and Gary Re-Unite"
2016	Gamer's Guide to Pretty Much Everything	Morty	Episode: "The Ringer"
2017	Hawaii Five-0	Itzhak Rozen	Episode: "Ka pa'ani nui", "Big Game"
2017	Superstore	Arthur	Episode: "Valentine's Day"
2019	Better Things	Irwin	Episode: "Nesting"
2019	Mom	Ken	Episode: "Goat Yogurt and Ample Parking"
2019	Silicon Valley	Lex Skelton	2 episodes
2020–2021	B Positive	Mr. Knudsen	8 episodes
2021	Grey's Anatomy	Father Christopher	Episode: "Here Comes the Sun"
2022	The Lincoln Lawyer	Marvin Beedleman	Episode: "He Rides Again"

=== Writer ===
Year	Title	Episodes	Notes
1978	The Love Boat	Episode: "Winner Take Love/The Congressman Was Indiscreet/Isaac's History Lesson"	Segment: "Isaac's History Lesson"
1978	The Love Boat	Episode: "Mike and Ike/The Witness/The Kissing Bandit"	Segments: "Mike and Ike" and "The Kissing Bandit"
1978	The Love Boat	Episode: "The Captain's Cup/Folks from Home/Legal Eagle"	
1979	The Love Boat	Episode: "A Funny Valentine/The Wallflower/Home Is Not a Home"	
1983	The Love Boat	Episode: "Bricker's Boy/Lotions of Love/The Hustlers"	
