= One Flight Down (Grey's Anatomy) =

- Grey's Anatomy episode
- Episode no.: Season 11; Episode 20
- Directed by: David Greenspan (filmmaker)
- Written by: Austin Guzman
- Original air date: April 16, 2015
- Running time: 43 minutes

Episode chronology
← Previous "Crazy Love"	Next → "How to Save a Life"
- Grey's Anatomy season 11

"One Flight Down" is the twentieth episode of the eleventh season of the American television medical drama Grey's Anatomy, and is the 240th episode overall. It aired on April 16, 2015, on ABC in the United States. The episode was written by Austin Guzman and directed by David Greenspan (filmmaker). The episode features a plane crash in Seattle bringing patients to Grey Sloan Memorial and old memories of season 8's tragic plane crash that claimed the lives of Mark Sloan (Eric Dane) and Lexie Grey (Chyler Leigh) back to Meredith Grey, Arizona Robbins, and Derek Shepherd.

== Plot ==
The episode opens with a voice-over narration from Meredith Grey (Ellen Pompeo) about how disaster strikes unexpectedly, revealing our true strength in the moment.

A plane crash in downtown Seattle brings a crop of new patients to Grey Sloan Memorial and old memories back to Meredith, Arizona, and Owen. Meredith tries to make it through the day without freaking out about not knowing where Derek is; Bailey gives her a 5:00 time frame for freaking out. No freaking out until 5:00 pm.

Alex sticks close to Arizona to make sure that she's okay, but she finds him more annoying than helpful. Alex tells Arizona that it was he who cut off her leg, not Callie. When asked, Callie tells Arizona that she was the one to make the call anyway, and she wanted her to have Alex and just be mad at her alone.

Owen and Amelia's separation becomes exacerbated when he's reminded of how he “failed his men” when he hired the service of the plane that went down with his doctors on it. Stephanie, who's obsessed with finding love, is determined to make her patient remember the pilot with whom she fell in love.

The clock finally strikes 5:00 pm, but when Meredith goes to the phone to call Derek, she sees lights from a police car pulling into her driveway.

== Reception ==
=== Broadcast ===
The episode was initially aired on April 16, 2015 and was viewed by 7.60 million viewers on its initial airing, marking an increase from the previous episode "Crazy Love" which was watched by 7.42 million viewers. It garnered a 2.1/7 Nielsen ratings, an increase from the previous instalment.

=== Reviews ===
The episode received mostly positive reviews from critics. The reactions of Owen, Meredith and Arizona to the plane crash were praised, but critics disliked the developments in the relationship of Owen Hunt and Amelia Shepherd. TV Equals wrote, "Overall, “One Flight Down” was a solid episode – not my favorite, but pretty entertaining. Owen and Meredith dealing with their respective guilt and PTSD, along with Maggie learning about the crash and Lexie, were the strongest parts of the episode." also praising Kevin McKidd, "Owen opening up about his guilt about being responsible for signing off on the plane that crashed was my favorite aspect of revisiting the fatal events from a few seasons ago. Kevin McKidd was so great in that scene."

Entertainment Weekly praised Owen's character, saying, "Owen’s not—his guilt is irrational, but it’s real. And to see that, something that so many people struggle with in real life, on TV is both comforting and powerful." Criticizing the development of the Owen-Amelia relationship, the site wrote, "Owen and Amelia’s relationship is far from easy and slowly descending into farce. It almost seems too complicated to keep going, and this is Owen’s modus operendi in cutting it dead. This is a very confused coupling and is in danger of losing fans even before it’s got started. " Also criticizing their relationship, Ashley Bissette of TV Fanatic wrote, "Amelia and Owen are making me want to bang my head against a wall. I initially loved the idea of these two being together, but now they are just infuriating."

Zap2it noted Patrick Dempsey's absence, "Just as fans were used to having him back after his sojourn to D.C. and declaring that he loves Meredith (Ellen Pompeo) and his family more than changing the world, Derek Shepherd has gone missing." The episode also focused on Kelly McCreary's character learning about Lexie Grey (Meredith's sister)) and the story-arc was praised, Tv Equals wrote, "I had completely forgotten that during the midst of all of this sisterly bonding, Maggie knew nothing about Lexie. Watching Meredith and Maggie learn more about each other is absolutely one of my favorite things about this season."
