= How to Save a Life (Grey's Anatomy) =

- Grey's Anatomy episode
- Episode no.: Season 11; Episode 21
- Directed by: Rob Hardy
- Written by: Shonda Rhimes
- Original air date: April 23, 2015
- Running time: 43 minutes

Guest appearances
- Samantha Sloyan as Dr. Penny Blake; Allie Grant as Alana; Savannah Paige Rae as Winnie; Che Landon as Sarah

Episode chronology
← Previous "One Flight Down"	Next → "She's Leaving Home"
- Grey's Anatomy season 11

"How to Save a Life" is the twenty-first episode of the eleventh season of the American television medical drama Grey's Anatomy, and the 241st episode overall. It aired on April 23, 2015 on the American Broadcasting Company (ABC) in the United States. The episode was written by showrunner Shonda Rhimes and directed by Rob Hardy, marking Rhimes' return to writing for the series since the Season 8 finale, "Flight". The installment is notable for the death of the series’ male lead character, Derek Shepherd (Patrick Dempsey), who had starred on the series since its inception.

In the episode, Derek is involved in a tragic accident after stopping to assist victims of a car crash. Despite successfully helping the accident victims, he is later pronounced brain-dead due to delays in receiving a timely CT scan from the surgeons at the hospital treating him.

The episode primarily focuses on only 6 of the regular cast members—Ellen Pompeo (Meredith Grey), Patrick Dempsey (Derek Shepherd), Chandra Wilson (Miranda Bailey), Kevin McKidd (Owen Hunt), Sarah Drew (April Kepner), and Caterina Scorsone (Amelia Shepherd). Additionally, it introduced Dr. Penelope Blake (Samantha Sloyan), whose actions contributed to Shepherd's tragic outcome.

"How to Save a Life's original broadcast was viewed by 9.55 million people, ranking it as the week's highest-rated drama and the third-highest rated scripted series in the 18–49 demographic. The episode received mixed reviews from critics, with polarizing views on the writing and handling of Derek's death; however, Pompeo's performance received universal acclaim, with critic Rick Porter calling it the best performance of her career.

== Plot ==
The episode opens with a voice-over narration from Meredith Grey (Ellen Pompeo) about the unpredictable nature of memory and how life's constant movement mirrors a carousel that never stops turning.

The episode opens with a flashback of a five-year-old Meredith Grey (Ellen Pompeo) lost in a park, symbolizing her recurring fear of abandonment. In the present, Derek Shepherd (Patrick Dempsey) is driving to Washington, D.C. to resign from the President's brain mapping project. On his way, he witnesses a car accident and instinctively pulls over to assist the victims. Shepherd quickly rescues a young girl named Winnie (Savannah Paige Rae) and helps her mother, who has a dislocated leg. With Winnie's help, he also saves another couple involved in the crash.

After paramedics arrive and transport the victims to the hospital, Shepherd prepares to leave. However, as he gets back into his car, he is hit by a semi-truck, leaving him critically injured. He is rushed to a nearby hospital, where he is unable to speak or communicate while the doctors examine him. Internally, Shepherd knows they need to order a head CT scan, but his attending physician dismisses the suggestion from surgical resident Dr. Penelope Blake (Samantha Sloyan). By the time the doctors realize the severity of his injuries—after noticing a blown pupil—Shepherd understands he is beyond saving. The neurosurgeon arrives too late, and Shepherd is declared brain dead.

Meredith is notified by the police and arrives at the hospital, where she is told about Derek’s condition. She immediately questions why a head CT wasn't performed, much to Blake’s dismay. After consulting with the doctor in charge, Meredith is forced to make the difficult decision of signing the papers to take Derek off life support. Before saying her final goodbye, Meredith forgives Dr. Blake, who tearfully apologizes for her role in the tragedy. The episode ends with Meredith returning to Derek’s room to say goodbye, accompanied by an emotional montage of the heyday of their relationship.

== Production ==
"How to Save a Life" was written by showrunner Shonda Rhimes and directed by Rob Hardy. This episode marked the first script Rhimes had penned since the season eight finale, "Flight". Filming for the episode took place both at the studio in Los Angeles and at outdoor locations, stretching over a span of three weeks. Samantha Sloyan, Larry Cedar, Mike McColl, Allie Grant, and Savannah Paige Rae made guest appearances in the episode. Sloyan reprised her role in the show’s 250th episode "Guess Who's Coming to Dinner" and was later promoted to a recurring character in Season 12.

The soundtrack for "How to Save a Life" featured covers, recorded by Sleeping at Last, of such previously used tracks as "Today Has Been OK", originally by Emilíana Torrini and "Chasing Cars", originally by Snow Patrol, and the originals "Sedona" by Houndmouth, "Gulls" by David Gray, and "Into the Fire" by Erin McCarley.

Speculation regarding Patrick Dempsey's exit from Grey's Anatomy began in November 2014, when Dempsey casually mentioned in an interview that he might be leaving the series soon. Though Dempsey had signed a contract for two more years at the end of Season 10, it was later revealed that his final appearance would be in Season 11. The official announcement regarding his exit was released on April 23, 2015, just hours before the airing of "How to Save a Life". Dempsey later shared that the decision to write out Derek Shepherd came about organically and was finalized in February 2015.

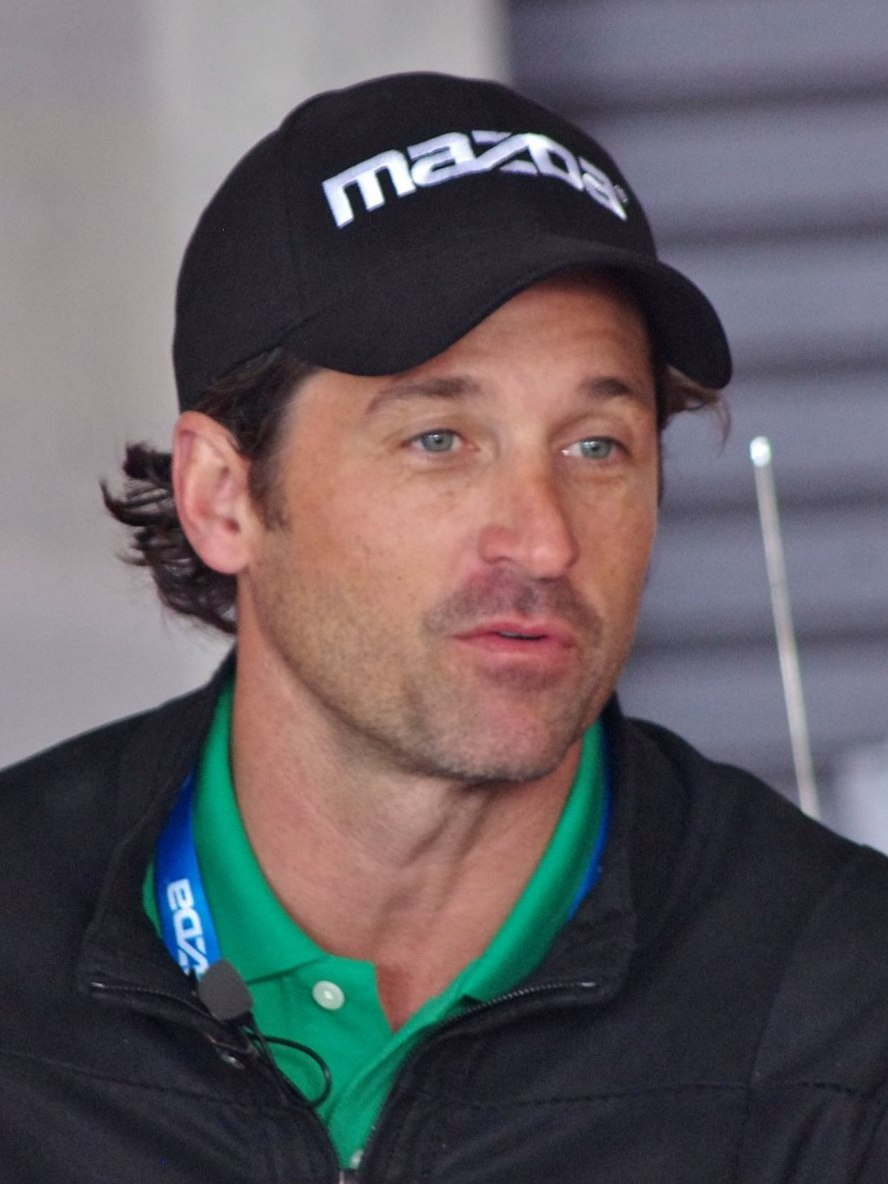
The episode marked the death of Derek Shepherd played by Patrick Dempsey.

Despite speculation of behind-the-scenes tension between Dempsey, Ellen Pompeo, and Shonda Rhimes, Dempsey asserted that he left the show on good terms. In an interview with Entertainment Weekly, Dempsey explained that had any real conflict existed, he would have likely exited at the end of Season 10 when his contract expired. He expressed satisfaction with the way his character’s arc concluded, saying he "[liked] the way it has all played out." Reflecting on his relationship with Pompeo, Dempsey remarked, "We’re like a married couple—it was magic from the beginning.” Rhimes asserted on the importance of Dempsey's character in the statement she released at his departure:

"Derek Shepherd is and will always be an incredibly important character—for Meredith, for me and for the fans. I absolutely never imagined saying goodbye to our ‘McDreamy.’ Patrick Dempsey’s performance shaped Derek in a way that I know we both hope became a meaningful example—happy, sad, romantic, painful and always true—of what young women should demand from modern love [but] as Ellis Grey would say: the carousel never stops turning.”—Rhimes to Lynette Rice, on Dempsey's exit

Pompeo reacted to Derek's death by posting on Twitter, sharing that she was honored and excited to continue telling Meredith’s story “in the face of what feels like the impossible”. She encouraged fans to stay with the series, expressing, "I hope you will all join me on her journey". This was the first time Pompeo spoke publicly about Dempsey’s departure.

== Reception ==
=== Broadcast ===
"How to Save a Life" was originally broadcast on April 23, 2015 in the United States on the American Broadcasting Company (ABC). The episode was watched by a total of 9.55 million viewers, representing a 24 percent increase from the previous episode, which had garnered 7.60 million viewers. In the key 18–49 demographic, the episode achieved a 2.8 Nielsen rating, marking a 33 percent increase from the prior episode’s rating of 2.1. This made the episode the highest-rated drama of the week and the third-highest-rated scripted series in the 18–49 demographic, trailing only CBS's The Big Bang Theory (3.6) and ABC's Modern Family (3.0).

Compared to the previous year’s telecast around the same time, viewership was up 23 percent and the Nielsen rating in the 18–49 demographic increased by 22 percent, registering the best ratings since the Season 11 premiere. While it was the second-highest-rated TV show in the 8:00 pm time slot, beating Bones, The Vampire Diaries and a rerun on The Blacklist, it was outperformed by The Big Bang Theory.

=== Critical reception ===
"How to Save a Life" received mixed reviews from critics, with polarizing views on the writing and handling of Derek Shepherd’s death; however, Ellen Pompeo's (Meredith Grey) performance received universal acclaim.

Ashley Bissette Sumerel of TV Fanatic gave the episode the highest praise, rating it 5 out of 5 stars, and highlighting the "interesting possibilities" Derek's death would offer for the show. She acknowledged the emotional impact of the episode, stating, "I'm beyond heartbroken. [...] We've seen tragic deaths and lost beloved characters, but never quite like this." Sumerel further recognized the show's courage in attempting the "inconceivable" by killing off a central character.

Ariana Bacle of Entertainment Weekly reflected on the emotional weight of losing long-standing characters, writing that despite some "weak moments" the series has had, it's the compelling characters like "Meredith, Derek, or Webber" that make the show "irresistible." She added, "watching one of those characters die hurts. It really, really hurts".

In contrast, a reviewer from Spoiler TV criticized the episode for being "self-indulgent" and lacking the emotional depth of previous character exits, such as those of Lexie Grey and Mark Sloan. The absence of many major cast members was also noted, with the reviewer remarking, "The presence of so many inconsequential and uninteresting characters was continually in danger of swamping the dreaminess of Derek." However, the review praised Pompeo's performance, stating, "the writing of Meredith was completely on point. She was clinical, as we would expect her to be".

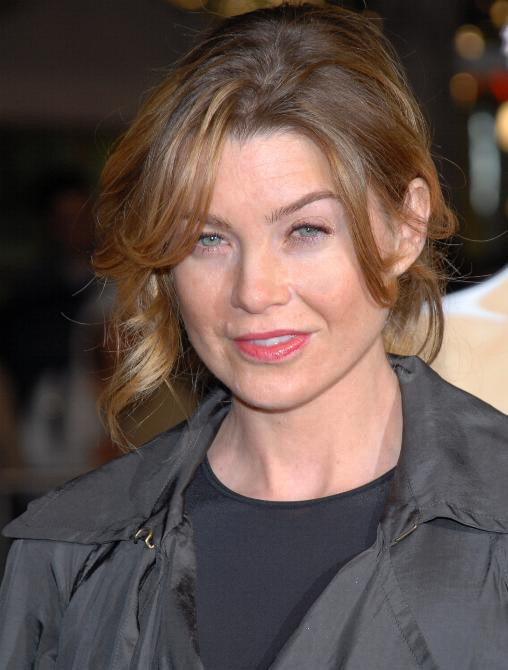
Ellen Pompeo's performance as Meredith Grey was universally hailed by television critics and audiences.

Pompeo's performance was universally hailed by critics. Rick Porter of Zap2it highlighted her portrayal as one of the strongest performances of her career, noting that without Pompeo’s emotional depth, the episode could have come across as "a baldly manipulative death episode". Porter acknowledged that while it might not be an "ideal Emmy-submission episode" for Pompeo due to the screen time, it still featured some of her best work on the show.

Robert Bianco of USA Today similarly praised the episode as a "showcase for Pompeo", noting her memorable scenes, especially her "angry response" to the doctor responsible for Derek's care and her resignation as she comforted the young doctor who made the critical mistakes. Alexandria Ingham from Guardian Liberty Voice also applauded Pompeo for her "range of emotions", from anger to compassion, saying she captured the emotional weight of the moment perfectly.

Shepherd's death came as a shock to the audience and was a major topic of discussion among critics, who gave polarising views on the character's exit. Janalen Samson of BuddyTV emphasized the genuine surprise generated by the episode in an era of spoiler-heavy television, calling it a "rare occurrence" and expressing her amazement at the unexpected turn. David Hinckley of New York Daily News called the death a "lightning bolt" and noted its significance in a season filled with high-mortality moments on television. Similarly, Lindsay Putnam of New York Post described the death as "unthinkable", especially given that Derek was one of the few remaining original cast members.

Reflecting on the long-term impact of Derek’s death, Aisha Harris of Slate remarked on the pivotal moment it created for the show, adding that while Grey's Anatomy is an ensemble show, Meredith has always been the central figure, making this "a very important turning point". However, Harris remained optimistic, stating, "if anyone can come out of this tragedy as a tougher, better character than ever, it’s Meredith Grey".
