= Sandra Deel (actress) =

American actress and singer (1927–2008)

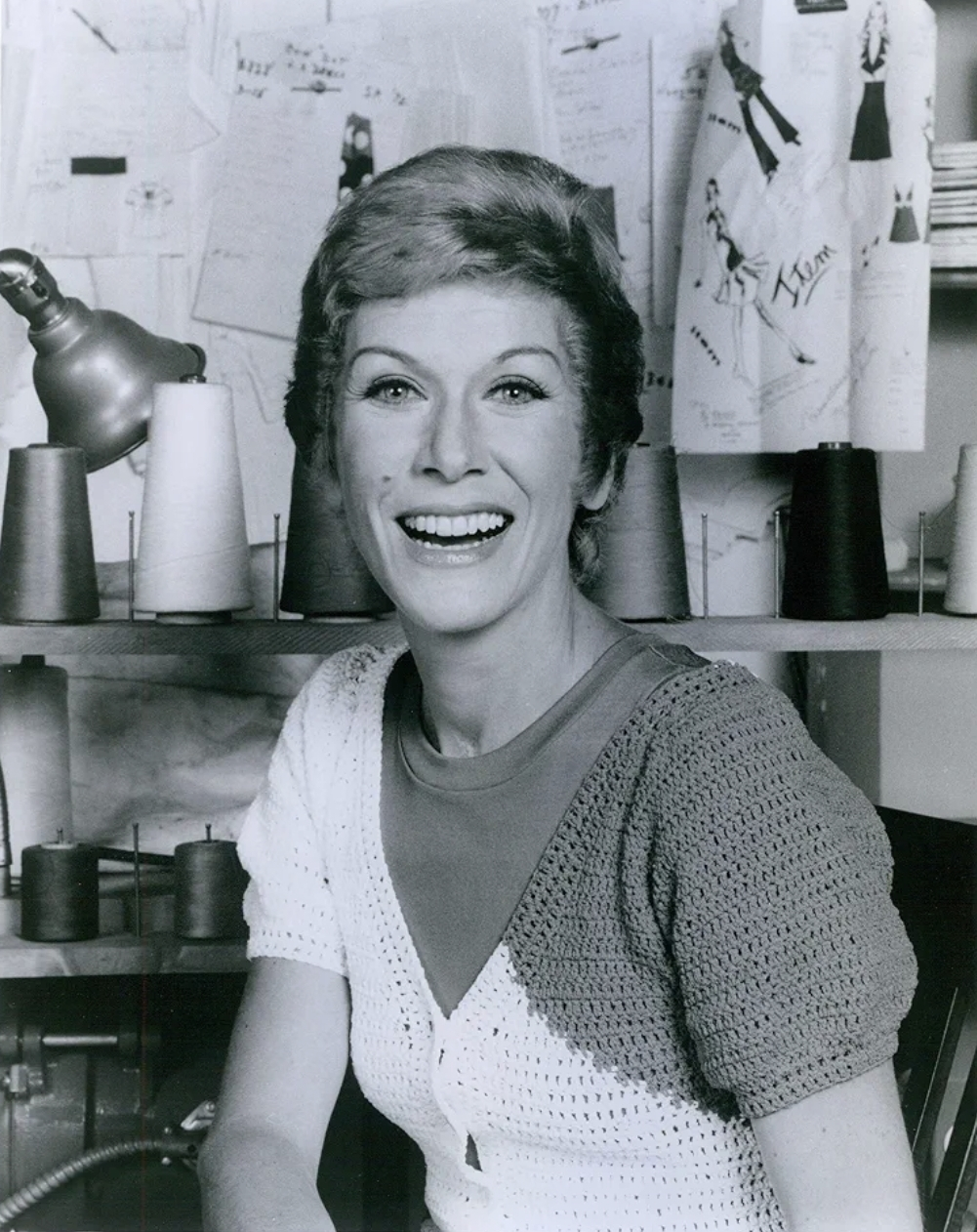
- Deel in Needles and Pins, 1973
- Born: June 26, 1927; United States
- Died: August 3, 2008 (aged 81); North Babylon, New York, U.S.
- Occupations: Actress, singer, dancer
- Years active: 1936–1977
- Spouse: I. Arnold Weissberger
- Children: 2

Sandra Deel (June 26, 1927 – August 3, 2008) was an American actress, singer and dancer whose career spanned Broadway, live television, regional musical theatre, and film.

Beginning as a child performer, she became one of the youngest members of the Radio City Music Hall Rockettes before establishing herself in Broadway musicals during the late 1940s and early 1950s. She later became a regular performer on early television, notably appearing on Caesar's Hour, before temporarily retiring from acting to raise her family. After a hiatus of approximately fourteen years, Deel returned to the stage in the late 1960s, appearing in the Broadway musical Company before transitioning into film and television. Her later screen credits included Junior Bonner (1972) and Needles and Pins (1973).

== Early life ==
Deel began performing professionally while still a child. She later recalled that acting became an important means of self-expression and that she had appeared on stage from an early age.

At the age of fifteen, Deel became a member of the Radio City Music Hall Rockettes, reportedly making her one of the youngest dancers admitted to the troupe. Because of her professional commitments, she completed her education at the Professional Children's School in New York City.

Her first major musical production was Nellie Bly, starring Billy Gaxton and Victor Moore, in which she received one of the principal singing roles.

== Career ==
After working as a Rockette, Deel established herself in musical theatre. Rodgers and Hammerstein engaged her to understudy Mary Martin during the national tour of Annie Get Your Gun. While touring, she was recalled to New York to appear in the Broadway production starring Ethel Merman, where she played Winnie Tate, the singing and dancing ingénue.

Following Annie Get Your Gun, Rodgers and Hammerstein again hired Deel for the touring production of South Pacific. She subsequently replaced Mary McCarty in the comedy lead of the Broadway musical Miss Liberty.

Besides Broadway, Deel became a frequent leading performer in summer stock and municipal opera productions. During the early 1950s she repeatedly portrayed Annie Oakley in Annie Get Your Gun at major summer theatres, including productions at the Pittsburgh Civic Light Opera, the St. John Terrell Music Circus in New Jersey, the South Shore Music Circus in Massachusetts, and other regional venues.

Reviewing her performance in the Pittsburgh production, drama critic Harold V. Cohen praised Deel's interpretation of Annie Oakley, writing that she brought "an agreeable combination of many of them, plus a little that can probably best be described as entirely New Deel." He also commended her singing of Irving Berlin's score, particularly "Doin' What Comes Natur'lly", "You Can't Get a Man with a Gun", and "Moonshine Lullaby".

In 1953 she appeared as Evalina in the St. Louis Municipal Opera production of Bloomer Girl opposite John Tyers.

Parallel to her theatre work, Deel became active in early live television. She began appearing on CBS with singer Johnny Desmond in 1947 in the musical series Face the Music, while simultaneously performing on Broadway.

Her television work also included dramatic anthology series such as Studio One and Kraft Television Theatre.

In 1955 she joined Sid Caesar's Caesar's Hour. According to Deel, Caesar initially hired her as an actress and only later discovered her abilities as a singer and dancer.

By 1956 Deel announced that she would leave Caesar's Hour following the June 18 broadcast. She planned to spend the summer before starring as Peter Pan at the St. Louis Municipal Opera and then pursue freelance television and stage work rather than immediately joining another weekly series.

After becoming one of television's familiar performers during the 1950s, Deel voluntarily withdrew from full-time acting to devote herself to raising her children. In a 1972 interview, she explained that although she enjoyed performing, she believed her children needed her attention during their formative years. During her years away from the profession she remained active in civic organizations, including the Parent-Teacher Association, while largely avoiding professional acting.

She later described the decision as entirely voluntary, explaining that family responsibilities had taken precedence over her career until her children were old enough for her to return to the stage.

After an absence from professional acting of approximately fourteen years, Deel returned to the stage during the late 1960s. Her comeback began with her portrayal of Nellie Forbush in a production of South Pacific at the Ogunquit Playhouse in Maine in 1969. In an interview during the engagement, she said acting had always been a form of self-expression and described the role as one she particularly enjoyed. She also expressed opposition to gratuitous nudity in the theatre, believing it should only be used when dramatically justified.

The production marked the beginning of a sustained return to acting. Deel subsequently became the standby for Elaine Stritch in the Broadway musical Company. When Stritch left the touring production, Deel assumed the role herself, leading to renewed visibility in the theatre industry.

Deel's successful return to Broadway led to opportunities in motion pictures. Director Sam Peckinpah cast her in the western film Junior Bonner (1972), starring Steve McQueen, which marked her feature film debut.

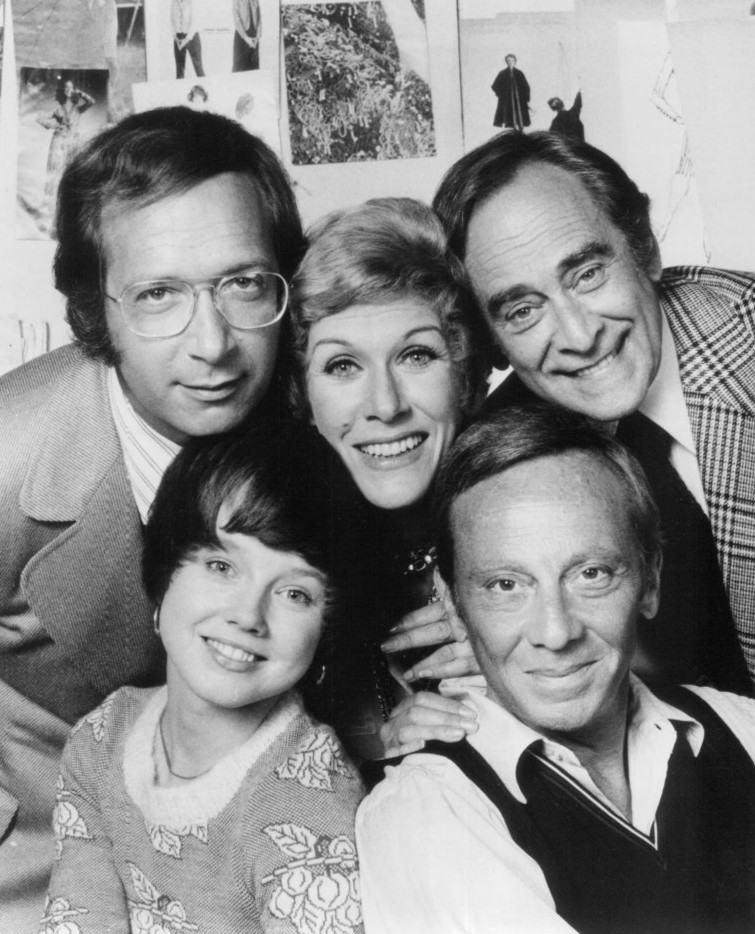
Cast of NBC series Needles and Pins, 1973. Bottom, from left: Deirdre Lenihan, Norman Fell. Top, from left: Bernie Kopell, Deel, and Louis Nye.

She later appeared in the television comedy series Needles and Pins, portraying Miss Wilson. Contemporary profiles described the series as one of her most prominent television assignments following her return to acting.

She continued appearing in both films and television throughout the 1970s, including roles in It Couldn't Happen to a Nicer Guy (1974), A Ghost Story (1974), Mary Jane Harper Cried Last Night (1977), and Little Ladies of the Night (1977).

== Personal life ==
Deel married I. Arnold Weissberger. The couple had two children, Michael and Harijane. Deel voluntarily suspended her acting career during the late 1950s in order to raise them, later describing the decision as one she never regretted.

Outside acting, Deel enjoyed fishing with her family. She and her husband owned a sport-fishing boat named Big Deel, aboard which the family landed a tuna weighing approximately 385 pounds. Deel frequently emphasized the importance of discipline and organization in her professional life. While appearing in Broadway productions, she became known for taking short naps between performances to maintain her demanding schedule.

== Death ==
Sandra Deel died August 8, 2008 on North Babylon, New York, at the age of 81.

== Filmography ==
=== Film ===
Year	Title	Role	Notes
1972	Junior Bonner	Nurse Arlis	

=== Television ===
Year	Title	Role	Notes
1951	Kraft Mystery Theatre		1 episode
1951	Musical Comedy Time		1 episode
1954	Colonel Humphrey Flack		1 episode
1954	Danger		1 episode
1954–1957	Caesar's Hour	Betty Hansen	Recurring role (1955–1956)
1955	Modern Romances		5 episodes
1972	Circle of Fear	Angie	Episode: "The Graveyard Shift"
1973–1974	Needles and Pins	Sonia Baker	14 episodes
1974	It Couldn't Happen to a Nicer Guy	Mrs. Carter	Television film
1975	Barney Miller	Ethel Gorman	1 episode
1975	Kojak	Mrs. Grubert	1 episode
1975	The Waltons	Rachel Stubblefield	1 episode
1977	Phyllis	Saleslady	1 episode
1977	Mary Jane Harper Cried Last Night	Mrs. Ramish	Television film
1977	Little Ladies of the Night	Mrs. Brodwick	Television film
1978–1979	The Love Boat	Dolores Strickland	2 episodes

=== Stage ===
Year	Production	Role	Venue / Notes
1940s	Nellie Bly	Supporting role	First major musical
Late 1940s	Annie Get Your Gun	Winnie Tate	Broadway
Late 1940s	Annie Get Your Gun	Mary Martin understudy	National tour
c. 1950	South Pacific	Performer	National tour
c. 1950	Miss Liberty	Comedy lead (replacement for Mary McCarty)	Broadway
1950	Annie Get Your Gun	Annie Oakley	Pittsburgh Civic Light Opera
1951	Annie Get Your Gun	Annie Oakley	St. John Terrell Music Circus
1952	Annie Get Your Gun	Annie Oakley	South Shore Music Circus
1953	Bloomer Girl	Evalina	St. Louis Municipal Opera
1956	Peter Pan	Peter Pan	St. Louis Municipal Opera
1969	South Pacific	Nellie Forbush	Ogunquit Playhouse
Early 1970s	Company	Joanne (Elaine Stritch standby and replacement)	Broadway and national company
Early 1970s	No, No, Nanette	Cast	National tour
