= Risko =

Risko is a surname. Notable people with the surname include:

- Eddie Babe Risko (1911–1957), Lithuanian-Polish-American boxer
- Robert Risko (born 1956), American caricature artist

== See also ==
- Riske
