= Judith D. Singer =

American academic

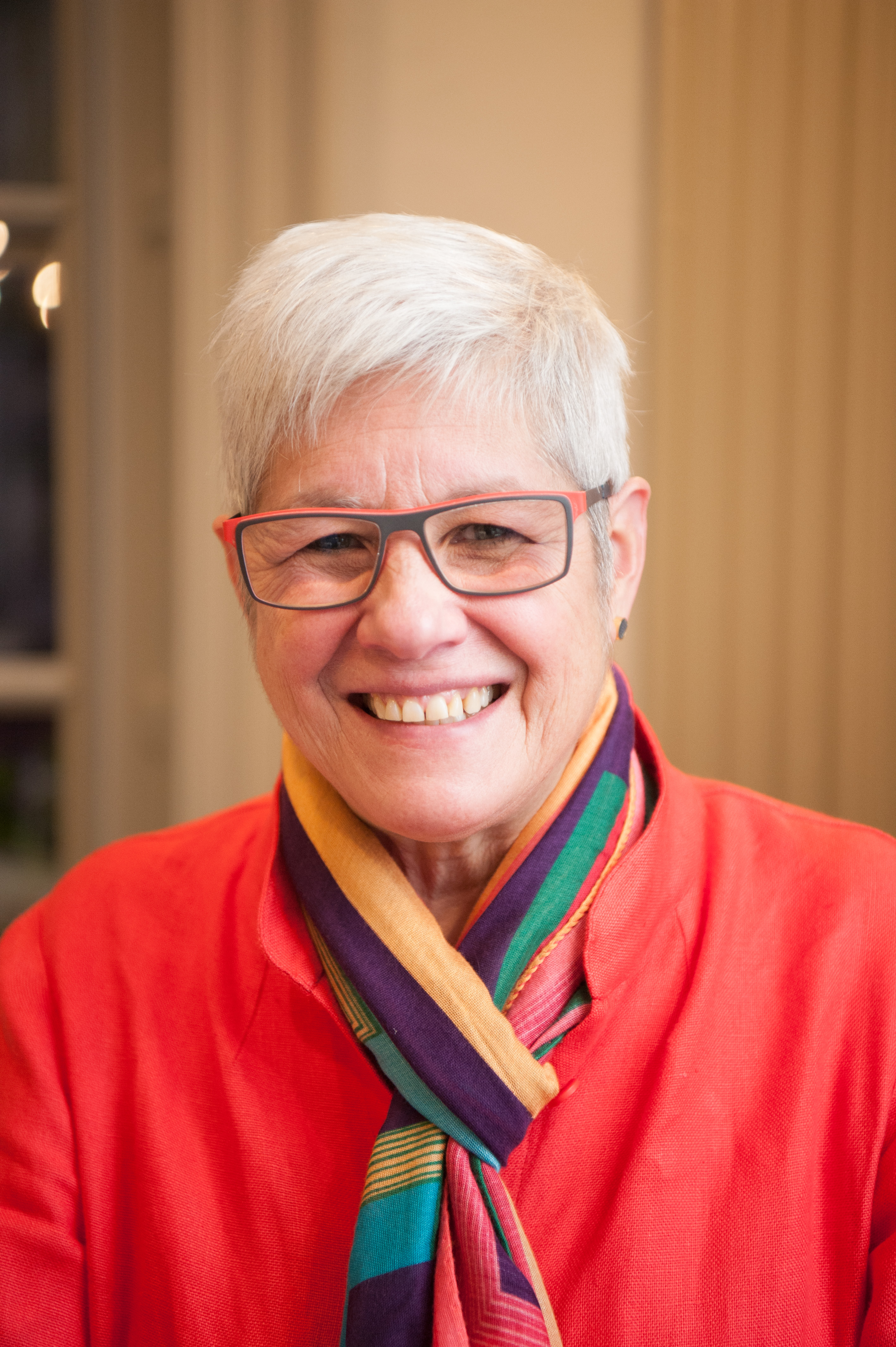
- Education: University at Albany, SUNY; Harvard University
- Occupation: Academic
- Employer: Harvard University

Judith D. Singer is an American academic, statistician, and social scientist. She is the James Bryant Conant Professor of Education (Harvard Graduate School of Education) and Senior Vice Provost for Faculty at Harvard University.

== Education ==
Singer graduated summa cum laude in Mathematics from the State University of New York at Albany in 1976; she entered graduate school at Harvard the same year. She received her Ph.D. in Statistics in 1983.

== Career ==
=== Harvard ===
Singer became an Assistant Professor of Education in 1984 and was promoted to Associate Professor in 1988. In 1993, she was appointed Professor, and in 2001 named James Bryant Conant Professor of Education. Before becoming the second Senior Vice Provost for Faculty Development and Diversity at Harvard University in 2008, she served as academic dean of the Harvard Graduate School of Education from 1999 to 2004 and acting dean from 2001 to 2002.

=== Research and writings ===
An internationally renowned statistician and social scientist, Singer’s scholarly interests focus on improving quantitative methods used in social, educational, and behavioral research. She is primarily known for her contributions to multilevel modeling, survival analysis, and individual growth modeling, and making these and other statistical methods accessible to empirical researchers. Singer has published across a broad array of disciplines, including statistics, education, psychology, medicine, and public health. In addition to writing and co-writing nearly 100 papers and book chapters, she has also co-written three books: By Design: Planning Better Research in Higher Education, Who Will Teach: Policies that Matter (both published by Harvard University Press), and Applied Longitudinal Data Analysis: Modeling Change and Event Occurrence (published by Oxford University Press), the latter of which received an honorable mention from the American Publishers Association for the best mathematics and statistics book of 2003. In 2018, she chaired a National Academy of Education panel on international education assessments and was the lead editor on the resulting monograph, International Education Assessments: Cautions, Conundrums, and Common Sense.

== Other roles and recognition ==
Singer was the first woman to be elected both a member of the National Academy of Education and a Fellow of the American Statistical Association. She was also elected to the initial class of Fellows of the American Educational Research Association. In 2014 she received the 13th annual Janet L. Norwood Award for Outstanding Achievement by a Woman in the Statistical Sciences from the School of Public Health at the University of Alabama. Her nomination by President Obama to serve as a member of the Board of Directors of the National Board of Education Sciences was confirmed by the US Senate in 2012; she recently concluded her second term. She was also a founding Board member of the Society for Research on Educational Effectiveness serving from 2006 - 2017.
