= List of guild awards received by Netflix =

This is a list of awards received by American streaming media company Netflix.

== American Cinema Editors Awards ==
Best Edited Feature Film — Dramatic

Year	Recipients	Film	Result	Ref.
2019	Alfonso Cuarón and Adam Gough	Roma	Nominated	
2020	Thelma Schoonmaker	The Irishman	Nominated	
2020	Jennifer Lame	Marriage Story	Nominated	

Best Edited Feature Film — Comedy or Musical

Year	Recipients	Film	Result	Ref.
2020	Billy Fox	Dolemite Is My Name	Nominated	

Best Edited Half-Hour Series for Television

Year	Recipients	Program	Episode	Result	Ref.
2014	Kabir Akhtar and A.J. Dickerson	Arrested Development	"Flight of the Phoenix"	Nominated	

Best Edited One Hour Series for Non-Commercial Television

Year	Recipients	Program	Episode	Result	Ref.
2014	Kirk Baxter	House of Cards	"Chapter 1"	Nominated	
2015	Byron Smith	House of Cards	"Chapter 14"	Nominated	
2016	Lisa Bromwell	House of Cards	"Chapter 39"	Won	
2017	Yan Miles	The Crown	"Assassins"	Nominated	
2017	Dean Zimmerman	Stranger Things	"Chapter One: The Vanishing of Will Byers"	Nominated	
2017	Kevin D. Ross	Stranger Things	"Chapter Seven: The Bathtub"	Nominated	

Best Edited Comedy Series for Non-Commercial Television

Year	Recipients	Program	Episode	Result	Ref.
2018	William Turro	GLOW	"Pilot"	Nominated	
2020	Liza Cardinale	Dead to Me	"Pilot"	Nominated	
2020	Todd Downing	Russian Doll	"The Way Out"	Nominated	

Best Edited Drama Series for Non-Commercial Television

Year	Recipients	Program	Episode	Result	Ref.
2018	Kevin D. Ross	Stranger Things	"Chapter Nine: The Gate"	Nominated	
2019	Cindy Mollo and Heather Goodwin Floyd	Ozark	"One Way Out"	Nominated	

Best Edited Mini-Series or Motion Picture for Television

Year	Recipients	Program	Episode	Result	Ref.
2016	William Turro	Orange Is the New Black	"Trust No Bitch"	Nominated	
2020	Terilyn A. Shropshire	When They See Us	"Part 1"	Nominated	

Best Edited Documentary Feature

Year	Recipients	Program	Episode	Result	Ref.
2017	Spencer Averick	13th	—	Nominated	
2017	Matthew Hamachek	Amanda Knox	—	Nominated	
2018	Ann Collins	Joan Didion: The Center Will Not Hold	—	Nominated	
2020	Lindsay Utz	American Factory	—	Nominated	

Best Edited Documentary for Television

Year	Recipients	Program	Episode	Result	Ref.
2018	Will Znidaric	Five Came Back	"The Price of Victory"	Won	
2019	Neil Meiklejohn	Wild Wild Country	"Part 3"	Nominated	
2019	Martin Singer	A Final Cut for Orson: 40 Years in the Making	—	Nominated	

== American Society of Cinematographers Awards ==
Outstanding Achievement in Cinematography in Theatrical Release

Year	Recipients	Film	Result	Ref.
2018	Alfonso Cuarón	Roma	Nominated	
2019	Rodrigo Prieto	The Irishman	Nominated	

Outstanding Achievement in Cinematography in Episode of a Regular Series

Year	Recipients	Program	Episode	Result	Ref.
2015	Vanja Černjul	Marco Polo	"The Fourth Step"	Won	

Outstanding Achievement in Cinematography in Television Movie, Miniseries, or Pilot

Year	Recipients	Program	Episode	Result	Ref.
2015	Romain Lacourbas	Marco Polo	"The Wayfarer"	Nominated	
2017	Christopher Probst	Mindhunter	"Episode 1"	Nominated	
2018	Brendan Steacy	Alias Grace	"Part 1"	Nominated	

Spotlight Award

Year	Recipients	Program	Episode	Result	Ref.
2015	Cary Fukunaga	Beasts of No Nation	—	Nominated	

Outstanding Achievement in Cinematography in Regular Series for Non-Commercial Television

Year	Recipients	Program	Episode	Result	Ref.
2016	David Dunlap	House of Cards	"Chapter 45"	Nominated	
2017	Adriano Goldman	The Crown	"Smoke and Mirrors"	Won	
2018	Adriano Goldman	The Crown	"Beryl"	Won	
2018	Cathal Watters	Peaky Blinders	"The Company"	Nominated	

== Art Directors Guild Awards ==
Period Film

Year	Recipients	Film	Result	Ref.
2018	Eugenio Caballero	Roma	Nominated	
2019	Bob Shaw	The Irishman	Nominated	

Half Hour Single-Camera Television Series

Year	Recipients	Program	Episode	Result	Ref.
2013	Denise Pizzini	Arrested Development	"The B. Team"	Nominated	
2017	Todd Fjelsted	GLOW	Episodes: "Pilot"; "The Wrath of Kuntar"; "The Dusty Spur"	Won	
2017	Amy Williams	Master of None	Episodes: "Le Nozze"; "Thanksgiving"; "Amarsi Un Po"	Nominated	
2018	Todd Fjelsted	GLOW	Episodes: "Viking Funeral"; "Perverts Are People, Too"; "Rosalie"	Won	
2019	Michael Bricker	Russian Doll	"Nothing in This World Is Easy"	Won	
2019	Todd Fjelsted	GLOW	"Up, Up, Up"	Nominated	

One-Hour Contemporary Single-Camera Series

Year	Recipients	Program	Episode	Result	Ref.
2014	Steve Arnold	House of Cards	"Chapter 18"	Nominated	
2015	Steve Arnold	House of Cards	"Chapter 29, "Chapter 36"	Won	
2016	Steve Arnold	House of Cards	"Chapter 41", "Chapter 47", "Chapter 48"	Nominated	
2016	Tim Galvin	Bloodline	"Part 16", "Part 21"	Nominated	
2018	Julie Walker	House of Cards	"Chapter 72"	Nominated	
2018	Derek R. Hill	Ozark	"The Gold Coast"	Nominated	
2019	Mark Worthington	The Umbrella Academy	"We Only See Each Other at Weddings and Funerals"	Won	

One-Hour Period or Fantasy Single-Camera Television Series

Year	Recipients	Program	Episode	Result	Ref.
2016	Martin Childs	The Crown	Episodes: "Wolferton Splash" "Hyde Park Corner" "Smoke and Mirrors"	Nominated	
2016	Chris Trujillo	Stranger Things	Episodes: "Chapter One: The Vanishing of Will Byers" "Chapter Three: Holly, Jolly" "Chapter Eight: The Upside Down"	Nominated	
2017	Bo Welch	A Series of Unfortunate Events	Episodes: "The Bad Beginning: Part One"; "The Reptile Room: Part One"; "The Wide Window: Part One"	Nominated	
2017	Martin Childs	The Crown	Episodes: "A Company of Men"; "Beryl"; "Dear Mrs. Kennedy"	Nominated	
2017	Steve Arnold	Mindhunter	Episodes: "Episode 1"; "Episode 4"; "Episode 9"	Nominated	
2017	Chris Trujillo	Stranger Things	Episodes: "Chapter Six: The Spy"; "Chapter Eight: The Mind Flayer"; "Chapter Nine: The Gate"	Nominated	
2018	Patricio M. Farrell	The Haunting of Hill House	"The Bent-Neck Lady"	Nominated	
2018	Bo Welch	A Series of Unfortunate Events	"The Ersatz Elevator: Part One"	Nominated	
2019	Bo Welch	A Series of Unfortunate Events	"Penultimate Peril: Part 1"	Nominated	
2019	Martin Childs	The Crown	"Aberfan"	Nominated	

Multi-Camera Series

Year	Recipients	Program	Episode	Result	Ref.
2016	John Shaffner	The Ranch	"Leavin's Been Comin' (For a Long, Long Time)"	Nominated	
2017	John Shaffner	The Ranch	Episodes: "Last Dollar (Fly Away)"; "Wrapped up in You"	Nominated	
2018	John Shaffner	The Ranch	Episodes: "Travelin' Prayer"; "Tie Our Love (In a Double Knot)"; "Fresh Out of Forgiveness"	Nominated	
2019	Aiyanna Trotter	Family Reunion	"Remember Black Elvis?"	Nominated	
2019	Kristan Andrews	No Good Nick	"The Italian Job"	Nominated	

Television Movie or Limited Series

Year	Recipients	Program	Episode	Result	Ref.
2017	Joel Collins	Black Mirror	"USS Callister"	Won	
2018	Alex Digerlando	Maniac	—	Nominated	
2019	Anne Beauchamp	Black Mirror	"Striking Vipers"	Nominated	

Variety or Competition Series/Awards or Event Special

Year	Recipients	Program	Episode	Result	Ref.
2017	James Pearse Connelly	Bill Nye Saves the World	"Earth Is a Hot Mess"	Nominated	

== Artios Awards ==
Achievement in Casting – Television Pilot Drama

Year	Recipients	Program	Result	Ref.
2013	Laray Mayfield	House of Cards	Won	
2017	Carmen Cuba, Carla Hool, Wittney Horton	Narcos	Nominated	

Outstanding Achievement in Casting – Television Pilot Comedy

Year	Recipients	Program	Result	Ref.
2015	Jennifer Euston	Orange Is the New Black	Won	
2016	Jennifer Euston, Emer O'Callaghan	Unbreakable Kimmy Schmidt	Nominated	
2016	Tracy Lilienfield, Emily Towler	Grace and Frankie	Nominated	
2017	Susie Farris, Melanie Crescenz	Wet Hot American Summer: First Day of Camp	Nominated	

Achievement in Casting – Television Series Drama

Year	Recipients	Program	Result	Ref.
2013	Laray Mayfield, Julie Schubert	House of Cards	Nominated	
2015	Laray Mayfield, Julie Schubert	House of Cards	Nominated	
2016	Laray Mayfield, Julie Schubert	House of Cards	Nominated	
2016	Nominees: Debra Zane Lori Wyman Shayna Markowitz Marie-Thérèse Verbruggen Erin Fragetta	Bloodline	Nominated	
2017	Laray Mayfield, Julie Schubert	House of Cards	Nominated	
2017	Jennifer Euston, Emer O'Callaghan	Orange Is the New Black	Nominated	
2017	Nominees: Debra Zane Lori Wyman Shayna Markowitz Marie-Thérèse Verbruggen Erin Fragetta	Bloodline	Won	

Outstanding Achievement in Casting – Television Series Comedy

Year	Recipients	Program	Result	Ref.
2015	Jennifer Euston, Emer O'Callaghan	Orange Is the New Black	Won	
2016	Jennifer Euston, Emer O'Callaghan	Orange Is the New Black	Nominated	
2017	Cindy Tolan, Anne Davison	Unbreakable Kimmy Schmidt	Nominated	

Achievement in Casting – Television Animation Adult

Year	Recipients	Program	Result	Ref.
2016	Linda Lamontagne	Bojack Horseman	Nominated	
2017	Linda Lamontagne	Bojack Horseman	Nominated	

Achievement in Casting – Television Animation Children

Year	Recipients	Program	Result	Ref.
2016	Ania O'Hare	The Adventures of Puss in Boots	Nominated	

Achievement in Casting – Children's Pilot and Series (Live Action)

Year	Recipients	Program	Result	Ref.
2017	Nominees: Alexis Frank Koczara Christine Smith Shevchenko Amanda Lenker Doyle	Fuller House	Nominated	

== Cinema Audio Society Awards ==
Outstanding Achievement in Sound Mixing for Television Series – One Hour

Year	Recipients	Program	Episode	Result	Ref.
2015	Nominees: Lorenzo Millan Nathan Nance Scott R. Lewis Corey Tyler	House of Cards	"Chapter 27"	Nominated	
2016	Nominees: Chris Durfy Joe Barnett Adam Jenkins Judah Getz John Guentner	Stranger Things	"Chapter Seven: The Bathtub"	Nominated	

Outstanding Achievement in Sound Mixing for a Television Movie or Mini-Series

Year	Recipients	Program	Episode	Result	Ref.
2016	Nominees: Adrian Bell Martin Jensen Philip Clements Rory de Carteret	Black Mirror	"San Junipero"	Nominated	

== Costume Designers Guild Awards ==
Excellence in Costume Design for a Contemporary Television Series

Year	Recipients	Program	Result	Ref.
2013	Tom Broecker	House of Cards	Won	
2014	Johanna Argan	House of Cards	Nominated	
2015	Johanna Argan, Kemal Harris	House of Cards	Nominated	
2016	Allyson B. Fanger	Grace and Frankie	Nominated	
2016	Johanna Argan, Kemal Harris	House of Cards	Nominated	

Excellence in Costume Design for a Period Series

Year	Recipients	Program	Result	Ref.
2016	Michele Clapton	The Crown	Won	
2016	Kimberly Adams, Malgosia Turzanska	Stranger Things	Nominated	

Excellence in Costume Design for a Contemporary Film

Year	Recipients	Film	Result	Ref.
2015	Jenny Eagan	Beasts of No Nation	Won	

== Directors Guild of America Awards ==
Outstanding Directing – Drama Series

Year	Recipients	Program	Episode	Result	Ref.
2013	David Fincher	House of Cards	"Chapter 1"	Nominated	
2014	Jodie Foster	House of Cards	"Chapter 22"	Nominated	
2016	The Duffer Brothers	Stranger Things	"Chapter One: The Vanishing of Will Byers"	Nominated	

Outstanding Directing – Comedy Series

Year	Recipients	Program	Episode	Result	Ref.
2014	Jodie Foster	Orange Is the New Black	"Thirsty Bird"	Nominated	

Outstanding Directing – Documentaries

Year	Recipients	Program	Episode	Result	Ref.
2015	Liz Garbus	What Happened, Miss Simone?	—	Nominated	

== Golden Reel Awards ==
Best Sound Editing in Television, Short Form — Music Score

Year	Recipients	Program	Episode	Result	Ref.
2015	Jonathon Stevens, Marie Ebbing	House of Cards	"Chapter 14"	Nominated	
2017	Michael Brake	Luke Cage	"Soliloquy of Chaos"	Nominated	
2017	David Klotz	Stranger Things	"Chapter Three: Holly Jolly"	Won	

Best Sound Editing in Television, Short Form — Music

Year	Recipients	Program	Episode	Result	Ref.
2016	Jonathon Stevens	House of Cards	"Chapter 33"	Won	

Best Sound Editing in Television, Short Form — Dialogue/ADR

Year	Recipients	Program	Episode	Result	Ref.
2016	Lauren Stephens	Daredevil	—	Nominated	

Best Sound Editing in Television, Animation — Effects/Foley/Dialogue/ADR

Year	Recipients	Program	Episode	Result	Ref.
2017	Nominees: Hunter Curra Konrad Piñon Andrew Twite Joy Elett Kailand C. Reilly	BoJack Horseman	"Fish Out of Water"	Nominated	

Best Sound Editing in Television, Documentary Short Form – Effects/Foley/Dialogue/ADR

Year	Recipients	Program	Episode	Result	Ref.
2016	William McGuigan	Chef's Table	—	Nominated	
2017	Claire Ellis, Kim Tae Hak	Captive	—	Nominated	
2017	William McGuiga, Nikola Simikic	Chef's Table	—	Nominated	
2017	Nominees: Pete Nichols Graham Barclay Aaron Cross Jason Coleman Barry Weir	Last Chance U	—	Nominated	
2017	Claire Ellis, Tom Foster	The White Helmets	—	Nominated	

Best Sound Editing in Television, Long Form — Musical

Year	Recipients	Program	Episode	Result	Ref.
2017	Nominees: Jamieson Shaw Dave Robertson	The Get Down	"Where There Is Ruin, there Is Hope"	Nominated	

Best Sound Editing in Television, Short Form – FX/Foley

Year	Recipients	Program	Episode	Result	Ref.
2016	Dave Patterson	Marco Polo	—	Nominated	
2017	Nominees: Dave Paterson Rachel Chancey Glenfield Payne Damian Volpe	Marco Polo	"Heirs"	Nominated	
2017	Nominees: Randle Akerson Steve Hammond Dino R.DiMuro	Narcos	"The Good, the Bad, and the Dead"	Nominated	
2017	Nominees: Bradley North Jacob McNaughton Noel Vought Craig Henighan Jordan Wilby Jonathan Golodner	Stranger Things	"Chapter Eight: The Upside Down"	Nominated	

Best Sound Editing in Television, Short Form — Musical

Year	Recipients	Program	Episode	Result	Ref.
2016	Emily Kwong	Wet Hot American Summer	—	Nominated	
2017	Jamieson Shaw	The Get Down	"Raise Your Words, Not Your Voice"	Won	
