= The Haunting (TV anthology) =

American television anthology

- Genre: Anthology; Drama; Supernatural; Horror
- Created by: Mike Flanagan
- Based on: The Haunting of Hill House by Shirley Jackson; The Turn of the Screw by Henry James
- Starring: Victoria Pedretti; Oliver Jackson-Cohen; Kate Siegel; Henry Thomas; Michiel Huisman; Carla Gugino; Elizabeth Reaser; Amelia Eve; T'Nia Miller; Rahul Kohli; Tahirah Sharif; Amelie Bea Smith; Benjamin Evan Ainsworth
- Composer: The Newton Brothers
- Country of origin: United States
- Original language: English
- No. of series: 2
- No. of episodes: 19

Production
- Executive producers: Meredith Averill; Darryl Frank; Justin Falvey; Trevor Macy; Mike Flanagan
- Producers: Dan Kaplow; Kathy Gilroy
- Cinematography: Michael Fimognari; James Kniest; Maxime Alexandre
- Editors: Jim Flynn; Brian Jeremiah Smith; Mike Flanagan; Ravi Subramanian
- Running time: 42–71 minutes
- Production companies: FlanaganFilm; Intrepid Pictures; Amblin Television; Paramount Television

Original release
- Network: Netflix
- Release: October 12, 2018 – October 9, 2020

The Haunting is an American television supernatural horror anthology series created by Mike Flanagan, and produced by Amblin Television and Paramount Television for Netflix. The first series, titled The Haunting of Hill House, premiered on October 12, 2018, and the second, titled The Haunting of Bly Manor, followed on October 9, 2020. Both series star Victoria Pedretti, Oliver Jackson-Cohen, Henry Thomas, Kate Siegel and Carla Gugino, portraying different characters across the two seasons.

== Production ==
=== The Haunting of Hill House ===
The first series, titled The Haunting of Hill House, is loosely based on the 1959 novel of the same name by Shirley Jackson. The plot alternates between two timelines, following five adult siblings whose paranormal experiences at Hill House continue to haunt them in the present day, and flashbacks depicting events leading up to the eventful night in 1992 when the family fled from the mansion. The ensemble cast features Michiel Huisman, Elizabeth Reaser, Oliver Jackson-Cohen, Kate Siegel, and Victoria Pedretti as the adult counterparts of the siblings, with Carla Gugino and Henry Thomas as parents Olivia and Hugh Crain, and Timothy Hutton appearing as an older version of Hugh.

On April 10, 2017, Netflix announced that it had ordered a 10-episode adaptation of the classic horror novel The Haunting of Hill House, with Mike Flanagan and Trevor Macy as executive producers, and Amblin Television and Paramount Television as co-production companies. It is the first scripted series to be made for Netflix by Amblin.

Production on the series began in October 2017 in Atlanta, Georgia, with location filming in the city and its environs. Bisham Manor, former name of the property located in LaGrange, served as the exterior of "Hill House". The house's interior settings were filmed at EUE/Screen Gem Studios in Atlanta.

=== The Haunting of Bly Manor ===
On February 21, 2019, Netflix ordered a second installment of The Haunting anthology series, titled The Haunting of Bly Manor, to be based on the 1898 The Turn of the Screw novella by Henry James. Though it serves as a follow-up to The Haunting of Hill House, Bly Manor is a standalone story and there is "no dramatic link between The Haunting of Bly Manor and its predecessor."

The series stars recurring cast members Victoria Pedretti, Henry Thomas, Oliver Jackson-Cohen and Kate Siegel, along with T'Nia Miller, Catherine Parker, Rahul Kohli, Benjamin Evan Ainsworth, Amelie Smith and Amelia Eve. The nine-episode series was released on October 9, 2020. Although the prominent source for the adaptation is The Turn of the Screw, the season also adapts (some more loosely) multiple James works, some of which had never been adapted previously.

=== Future ===
Following the release of The Haunting of Bly Manor, Flanagan confirmed on Twitter in December 2020 that there were "no plans for more chapters" of the series, though he added that he would keep fans informed "if things change". Flanagan confirmed in November 2023 that were a third installment to be commissioned, the season would adapt Richard Matheson's Hell House and be titled The Haunting of Hell House; however, the rights were not yet available.

== Cast ==
List indicator

This section includes characters who will appear or have appeared in both series.

- A green cell indicates the actor is a main cast member.
- A red cell indicates the actor is a recurring cast member.

Actor	Capacity and character per season	
Actor	Hill House	Bly Manor
Henry Thomas	Hugh Crain (young)	Henry Wingrave
Victoria Pedretti	Eleanor "Nell" Crain Vance (adult)	Danielle "Dani" Clayton
Oliver Jackson-Cohen	Luke Crain (adult)	Peter Quint
Kate Siegel	Theodora "Theo" Crain (adult)	Viola Willoughby / The Lady of the Lake
Carla Gugino	Olivia Crain	Jamie Taylor (older) / The Storyteller
Catherine Parker	Poppy Hill	Perdita Willoughby

== Episodes ==
Series	Episodes	Originally released
Hill House	10	October 12, 2018
Bly Manor	9	October 9, 2020

=== The Haunting of Hill House (2018) ===
No.	Title	Directed by	Written by	Original release date
1	"Steven Sees a Ghost"	Mike Flanagan	Teleplay by : Mike Flanagan	October 12, 2018
2	"Open Casket"	Mike Flanagan	Mike Flanagan	October 12, 2018
3	"Touch"	Mike Flanagan	Liz Phang	October 12, 2018
4	"The Twin Thing"	Mike Flanagan	Scott Kosar	October 12, 2018
5	"The Bent-Neck Lady"	Mike Flanagan	Meredith Averill	October 12, 2018
6	"Two Storms"	Mike Flanagan	Mike Flanagan & Jeff Howard	October 12, 2018
7	"Eulogy"	Mike Flanagan	Charise Castro Smith	October 12, 2018
8	"Witness Marks"	Mike Flanagan	Jeff Howard & Rebecca Klingel	October 12, 2018
9	"Screaming Meemies"	Mike Flanagan	Meredith Averill	October 12, 2018
10	"Silence Lay Steadily"	Mike Flanagan	Mike Flanagan	October 12, 2018

=== The Haunting of Bly Manor (2020) ===
No.	Title	Directed by	Written by	Original release date
1	"The Great Good Place"	Mike Flanagan	Mike Flanagan	October 9, 2020
2	"The Pupil"	Ciarán Foy	James Flanagan	October 9, 2020
3	"The Two Faces, Part One"	Ciarán Foy	Diane Ademu-John	October 9, 2020
4	"The Way It Came"	Liam Gavin	Laurie Penny	October 9, 2020
5	"The Altar of the Dead"	Liam Gavin	Angela LaManna	October 9, 2020
6	"The Jolly Corner"	Yolanda Ramke & Ben Howling	Rebecca Leigh Klingel	October 9, 2020
7	"The Two Faces, Part Two"	Yolanda Ramke & Ben Howling	The Clarkson Twins	October 9, 2020
8	"The Romance of Certain Old Clothes"	Axelle Carolyn	Leah Fong	October 9, 2020
9	"The Beast in the Jungle"	E. L. Katz	Julia Bicknell	October 9, 2020

== Reception ==
Critical response of The Haunting
Series	Rotten Tomatoes	Metacritic
Hill House	93% (97 reviews)	79 (18 reviews)
Bly Manor	87% (94 reviews)	63 (18 reviews)

=== The Haunting of Hill House ===
On Rotten Tomatoes, The Haunting of Hill House has a 93% rating based on 97 reviews, with an average rating of 8.46/10. The website's critical consensus reads, "The Haunting of Hill House is an effective ghost story whose steadily mounting anticipation is just as satisfying as its chilling payoff." On Metacritic, it has a weighted average score of 79 out of 100 based on 18 critics, indicating "generally favorable reviews".

=== The Haunting of Bly Manor ===
On Rotten Tomatoes, The Haunting of Bly Manor has an 87% rating based on 94 reviews, with an average rating of 7.26/10. The critics consensus reads, "It may not be as scary as its predecessor, but with plenty of spooky tricks inside its haunted halls and a strong sense of heart, The Haunting of Bly Manor is another solid entry into Mike Flanagan's growing horrorography." On review aggregator Metacritic, The Haunting of Bly Manor received a score of 63 out of 100 based on 18 critical reviews, indicating "generally positive reviews".
