= The Jolly Corner =

- Short story by Henry James

Text available at Wikisource
- Country: United Kingdom
- Language: English
- Genre: Short story

Publication
- Publication type: Periodical
- Publisher: The English Review
- Media type: Print (magazine)
- Publication date: December 1908
- Pages: 30 pp

"The Jolly Corner" is a short story by Henry James published first in the magazine The English Review in December 1908. One of James' most noted ghost stories, "The Jolly Corner" describes the adventures of Spencer Brydon as he prowls the now-empty New York City house where he grew up. Spencer encounters a "sensation more complex than had ever before found itself consistent with sanity".

== Plot summary ==
Spencer Brydon returns to New York City after 33 years abroad. He has returned to "look at his 'property'": two buildings, the first one his boyhood home on the "jolly corner", and the second, larger structure now going to be renovated into a big apartment building. These properties have been the source of his income since the deaths of his family members.

Spencer finds he is good at directing the renovation, despite never having done this work before, suggesting that his innate ability for business was hiding deep within him unused. Spencer rekindles a relationship with an old friend, Alice Staverton, who has always lived in New York. Both comment on his "real gift" for business and construction which he also finds "vulgar and sordid". He starts to wonder who he would have been if he had stayed in the United States. Spencer begin to realize that he might have been an astute businessman if he had not forsaken moneymaking for a more leisurely life; he discusses this possibility with Alice.

Spencer begins to believe that his American alter ego—the ghost of the man he might have been—is haunting the "jolly corner", his nickname for the old family house. He starts to prowl the house at night to try to meet his alter ego. After a harrowing night of pursuit in the house, Spencer finally confronts the ghost, who advances on him and overpowers him with "a rage of personality before which his own collapsed". Spencer eventually awakens with his head pillowed on Alice's lap. Alice had come to the house because she sensed he was in danger. She tells him that she pities the ghost of his alter ego, who has suffered and lost two fingers from his right hand, but she also embraces and accepts Spencer as he is. Spencer muses that "He has a million a year [...] But he hasn't you." It is left ambiguous whether or not Spencer had actually become unconscious or whether he had died and has awoken in an afterlife.

== Adaptations ==
A television version of the story was produced during 1975 with Fritz Weaver as Spencer Brydon and Salome Jens as Alice Staverton. An episode of Mike Flanagan's The Haunting of Bly Manor, also titled "The Jolly Corner", is inspired by this story.
