= Julian Hilliard =

American actor (born 2011)

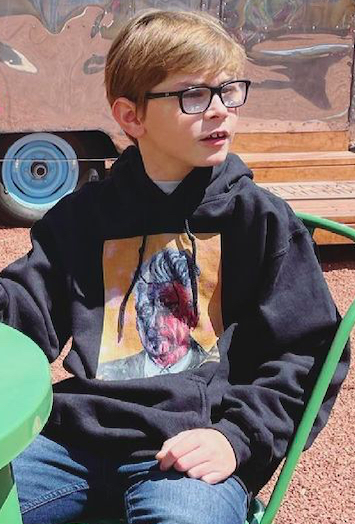
- Hilliard in 2021
- Born: June 20, 2011 (age 15); Dallas, Texas, U.S.
- Occupation: Actor

Julian Hilliard (born June 20, 2011) is an American actor, best known for his roles in television and film, including The Haunting of Hill House (2018), WandaVision (2021), and Doctor Strange in the Multiverse of Madness (2022), the latter two in which he portrayed Billy Maximoff in the Marvel Cinematic Universe. Born in Dallas, Texas, Hilliard is the son of actress Arianne Martin and director/writer/producer Justin D. Hilliard.

== Career ==
In 2018, Hilliard played Young Luke Crain in the Netflix horror series The Haunting of Hill House, created by Mike Flanagan. His portrayal of the character earned him a Young Artist Award nomination for Best Performance in a Streaming Series or Film: Young Actor in 2019. The cast was nominated for an OFTA Television Award for Best Ensemble in a Motion Picture or Limited Series that same year.

In 2021, Hilliard was part of the cast of the Marvel Studios miniseries WandaVision, set in the Marvel Cinematic Universe and which aired on Disney+. He played Billy Maximoff, son of Wanda Maximoff (Elizabeth Olsen) and the Vision (Paul Bettany), and twin brother of Tommy (Jett Klyne). He later reprised the role in Doctor Strange in the Multiverse of Madness, released in 2022.

In 2021, Hilliard was part of the cast of The Conjuring: The Devil Made Me Do It, the third installment in The Conjuring franchise. He portrayed David Glatzel, a young boy who becomes the center of a supernatural investigation led by paranormal investigators Ed and Lorraine Warren, played by Patrick Wilson and Vera Farmiga.

== Filmography ==
=== Television ===
Year	Title	Role
2018	The Haunting of Hill House	Young Luke Crain
2020	Penny Dreadful: City of Angels	Tom Craft
2021	WandaVision	Billy Maximoff

=== Film ===
Year	Title	Role
2012	A Father	Child
2018	Never Goin' Back	Boy at Diner
2019	Greener Grass	Julian
2019	Color Out of Space	Jack Gardner
2021	The Conjuring: The Devil Made Me Do It	David Glatzel
2022	Doctor Strange in the Multiverse of Madness	Billy Maximoff
2025	The Conjuring: Last Rites	David Glatzel (cameo)
