= Art Directors Guild Awards 2018 =

Annual US film and television awards ceremony

23rd Art Directors Guild Awards
- Date: February 2, 2019

The 23rd Art Directors Guild Excellence in Production Design Awards took place on February 2, 2019, at the InterContinental Los Angeles Downtown, honoring the best production designers of 2018. Nominations were announced on January 7.

== Winners and nominees ==
=== Film ===
Period Film:

- Fiona Crombie – The Favourite
  - Jess Gonchor – The Ballad of Buster Scruggs
  - Aaron Haye – Bohemian Rhapsody
  - Nathan Crowley – First Man
  - Eugenio Caballero – Roma

Fantasy Film:

- Hannah Beachler – Black Panther
  - Stuart Craig – Fantastic Beasts: The Crimes of Grindelwald
  - Jon Hutman – The House with a Clock in Its Walls
  - John Myhre – Mary Poppins Returns
  - Adam Stockhausen – Ready Player One

Contemporary Film:

- Nelson Coates – Crazy Rich Asians
  - Peter Wenham – Mission: Impossible – Fallout
  - Jeffrey Beecroft – A Quiet Place
  - Karen Murphy – A Star Is Born
  - Stefan Dechant – Welcome to Marwen

Animated Film:

- Adam Stockhausen and Paul Harrod – Isle of Dogs
  - Colin Stimpson – Dr. Seuss' The Grinch
  - Ralph Eggleston – Incredibles 2
  - Cory Loftis – Ralph Breaks the Internet
  - Justin K. Thompson – Spider-Man: Into the Spider-Verse

=== Television ===
One-Hour Period or Fantasy Single-Camera Television Series:

- Bill Groom – The Marvelous Mrs. Maisel (for "Simone", "We're Going to the Catskills!")
  - Patricio M. Farrell – The Haunting of Hill House (for "The Bent-Neck Lady")
  - Drew Boughton – The Man in the High Castle (for "Now More Than Ever, We Care About You", "History Ends", "Jahr Null")
  - Bo Welch – A Series of Unfortunate Events (for "The Ersatz Elevator: Part One")
  - Howard Cummings – Westworld (for "Akane no Mai")

One-Hour Contemporary Single-Camera Television Series:

- Mark White and Elisabeth Williams – The Handmaid's Tale (for "June", "Unwomen")
  - Judy Rhee – Better Call Saul (for "Piñata", "Coushatta")
  - Steve Arnold – Castle Rock (for "The Box")
  - Julie Walker – House of Cards (for "Chapter 72")
  - Derek R. Hill – Ozark (for "The Gold Coast")

Half Hour Single-Camera Television Series:

- Todd Fjelsted – GLOW (for "Viking Funeral", "Perverts Are People, Too", "Rosalie")
  - Timothy O'Brien – Atlanta (for "Teddy Perkins")
  - Ian Phillips – The Good Place (for "Janet(s)")
  - Anastasia White – Homecoming (for "Mandatory")
  - Richard Toyon – Silicon Valley (for "Tech Evangelist", "Artificial Emotional Intelligence")

Multi-Camera Series:

- David Gallo – Sesame Street (for "Book Worming", "The Count's Counting Error", "Street Food")
  - John Shaffner – The Big Bang Theory (for "The Novelization Correlation", "The Sibling Realignment", "The Bow Tie Asymmetry")
  - Jane Musky – Murphy Brown (for "#MurphyToo")
  - John Shaffner – The Ranch (for "Travelin’ Prayer", "Tie Our Love (In a Double Knot)", "Fresh Out of Forgiveness")
  - Glenda Rovello – Will & Grace (for "The Three Wise Men," "Tex and the City", "Anchor Away")

Television Movie or Limited Series:

- Mara LePere-Schloop – The Alienist (for "The Boy on the Bridge")
  - Valdar Wilt – American Horror Story: Apocalypse (for "Fire and Reign")
  - Judy Becker – The Assassination of Gianni Versace: American Crime Story
  - Alex Digerlando – Maniac
  - John Paino – Sharp Objects

Variety or Competition Series/Awards or Event Special:

- Derek McLane – 90th Academy Awards
  - Chloe Arbiture – Drunk History (for "Halloween")
  - Jason Ardizzone-West – Jesus Christ Superstar Live in Concert
  - Schuyler Telleen – Portlandia (for "Riot Spray")
  - Keith Raywood, Eugene Lee, Akira Yoshimura and N. Joseph DeTullio – Saturday Night Live (for "Bill Hader/Arcade Fire", "John Mulaney/Jack White", "Donald Glover/Childish Gambino")

Short Format: Web Series, Music Video or Commercial:

- Christopher Glass – Apple: "Welcome Home"
  - Ethan Tobman – Ariana Grande: "No Tears Left to Cry"
  - Kai Boydell – A Tribe Called Quest: "The Space Program"
  - Ethan Tobman – Kendrick Lamar: "All the Stars"
  - Michael Gaw – Nespresso: "Quest"
  - Shane Valentino and Craig Pavilionis – Rolex: "2018 Academy Awards"
