= The Romance of Certain Old Clothes =

1868 short story by Henry James

- Short story by Henry James

Text available at Wikisource
- Country: United States
- Genre: Short story

Publication
- Published in: The Atlantic Monthly
- Publication date: 1868

"The Romance of Certain Old Clothes" is a short story by American-British author Henry James, written in February 1868 and first published in The Atlantic Monthly. The original debut was in volume 21, issue 124. James later made some revisions, including changes to the family name and eldest daughter when he published the story in the UK in 1885. It has been included in several anthologies, including American Gothic Tales, edited by Joyce Carol Oates.

== Plot summary ==
The tale begins in the 18th century in Massachusetts. It features the Willoughby family (called Wingrave in the 1885 revision), consisting of a widowed mother, one son named Bernard, and two daughters. The girls, Perdita and Viola (changed to Rosalind in the 1885 version), are considered by the narrator to be equally beautiful. Respecting her late husband's wish, the mother sends Bernard to England to study at the University of Oxford, where he meets the Briton, Arthur Lloyd, with whom he becomes friends. After his studies, Bernard returns home, accompanied by Lloyd.

Both sisters fall in love with Mr. Arthur Lloyd, who then feels he must choose between them. The sisters vow not to be envious or angry at his choice. When Lloyd chooses Perdita, Viola is jealous but does not act on it. After the wedding, Mr. Lloyd leaves the now-pregnant Perdita at home when he attends the wedding of his brother-in-law, where he encounters his sister-in-law, Viola. Arthur receives a message that his daughter has been born but his wife's health is failing. Perdita, aware that she is dying and angry that her husband was with Viola on the day their daughter was born, makes Arthur promise to preserve the gowns she has saved in a chest for their daughter. She fears Viola will marry Lloyd and appropriate the dresses for herself. Arthur swears to Perdita that he will protect the chest and its contents until their daughter is old enough to wear them.

After Perdita's death, Viola eventually marries Mr. Lloyd. A series of misfortunes follow, leaving them with significant financial losses and with Viola unable to bear children. At this time, Viola begins to pressure Arthur to open the chest. Arthur argues that he made a promise to Perdita and tells Viola that the matter is closed. However, Viola keeps asking for her late sister's wardrobe until Arthur gives in, in a fit of annoyance, and provides Viola with the key to her sister's chest, which is stored in the attic. When Viola has failed to attend dinner or respond to several of Mr. Lloyd's summons, he climbs the stairs to the attic, where the chest is kept, to look for her. In the attic, he finds Viola dead, on her knees in front of the opened chest, with ten hideous wounds inflicted by ghostly hands.

== Analysis ==
The tale is considered to be a Gothic tale due to its Freudian uncanny nature. It is something that is familiar while at the same time being repressed. It is possibly something that is hidden, but has been brought to life. Freud describes it as atavistic feelings of death.

== Reception ==
Many critics seem to agree this story is a reflection of Sigmund Freud's theory of "the uncanny". Critics say that it is a revenge story about the grudges of the dead combined with sibling rivalry. Some critics also note that James' writing style in this work reflects Nathaniel Hawthorne's.

== Screen ==
The story, along with James's The Turn of the Screw, forms the basis for the plot of Mike Flanagan's TV miniseries The Haunting of Bly Manor. Both stories are substantially altered in the adaptation.
