= Star-Crossed (TV series) =

- Genre: Science fiction; Romance; Teen drama
- Created by: Meredith Averill
- Starring: Aimee Teegarden; Matt Lanter; Grey Damon; Malese Jow; Titus Makin Jr.; Natalie Hall; Chelsea Gilligan; Greg Finley; Brina Palencia
- Composer: Gabriel Mann
- Country of origin: United States
- Original language: English
- No. of seasons: 1
- No. of episodes: 13

Production
- Executive producers: Andre Nemec; Bryan Furst; Daniel Gutman; Josh Appelbaum; Meredith Averill; Richard Shepard; Scott Rosenberg; Sean Furst
- Producer: Joseph Zolfo
- Running time: 42 minutes
- Production companies: Space Floor Television; Olé Productions; Warner Bros. Television; CBS Television Studios

Original release
- Network: The CW
- Release: February 17 – May 12, 2014

Star-Crossed is an American science fiction romantic teen drama television series created by Meredith Averill. The series premiered on The CW on February 17, 2014, and concluded on May 12, 2014, with a total of 13 episodes.

On May 8, 2014, The CW cancelled Star-Crossed after one season due to low ratings.

== Synopsis ==
Set in the near-future in 2024, the series follows a romance between a human girl named Emery and an alien boy named Roman when he and six others of his kind are integrated into a suburban high school. It is filmed and takes place in Louisiana in the fictional town of Edendale.

== Cast and characters ==
=== Main ===
- Aimee Teegarden as Emery Whitehill:

Emery is a 16-year-old human girl who lives in Edendale, Louisiana and the female protagonist of Star Crossed. She was 6 years old when the Atrians arrived, and on that day, she helped a young Atrian boy (later found out to have been Roman) survive. Emery spent 4 years in the hospital due to an immune deficiency and just recently began high school at the beginning of the show. Emery's first day of high school is also the day the integration program is set into action. She believes strongly in integration and meets Roman during that week. There is an immediate attraction between the two of them as the show's main love story begins to form. Emery is best friends with Julia, but is also close with Lukas, Taylor, Sophia, and, later on in the show, Eric. Her other love interest in the show is Grayson Montrose, a human boy who is seen to have cared about Emery since the beginning of the show. Her main enemy is Teri, Roman's ex-girlfriend who constantly shows dislike for humans, especially Emery.

- Matt Lanter as Roman:

Roman is a 16-year-old Atrian boy who now lives on Earth in a militarized sector with the remaining members of his race. When Roman was a little boy and had to flee from the chaos of Arrival Day, he took refuge in Emery's parents' tool house upon which Emery found him and cared for him until he was found. Roman defends humans and does not despise them, he feels that while they're very unwelcoming, but knows that just like Emery, there are good people in the world. He is the son of Nox, leader of the Atrians, and is thus a natural born leader. His father dies in the Pilot after being shot by Emery's father Ray Whitehill. Roman's father's death took a huge toll on him as he now feels it is his job to keep his race alive and protect his mother and his sister, Sophia. Roman notices Emery on the first day of school and immediately recognizes her. Throughout the show, Roman is seen as having to choose between his love for Emery or keeping her safe, being that her father killed his people's leader. He feels the pressure of having to choose between his people or Emery. Roman is best friends with Drake, and he was once friends with Teri, despite their romantic past, until she betrays him and he decides that they cannot be friends. He is also close with Julia, Lukas, and friends with Taylor. His main enemy on the show is Grayson, the human boy who is also in love with Emery, and whose parents are leaders of the Red Hawks, and another concern throughout the show are the Trags a group of rebel Atrians. His uncle that takes over as leader used to be a Trag.

- Grey Damon as Grayson Montrose:

Grayson is a 16-year-old human boy who lives in Edendale, Louisiana. He is an average teenage boy (hangs out with his friends, he's on the school swim team, etc.) except for the fact that his parents are the leaders of a terrorist group against the Atrians inhabiting Earth known as the Red Hawks. Grayson is always shown to be kind and welcoming despite growing up with parents like his, but he is also seen as resolute and stubborn, using any means necessary to get what he wants. Grayson's main love interest in this show is Emery, whom he's liked a lot since the beginning of the show. When Emery learned about Grayson's parents, she was infuriated, however, she eventually forgave them and the two had a very brief romantic relationship. Grayson is best friends with Eric but is also friends with Taylor, Lukas, and Julia. His main enemy in the show is Roman, who is also in love with Emery.

- Malese Jow as Julia Yeung:

Julia is a 16-year-old human girl who lives in Edendale, Louisiana. Julia was diagnosed with Leukemia at the beginning of the show and since none of the treatments were working she was told she must go home, however Roman saves her by combining his blood with cyper as a favor to Emery. She is a very bubbly, lively young girl who is fascinated with 'all things Atrian. Julia's main love interest later in the show is Eric, an ex Red Hawk who comes to appreciate having the Atrians around. Her best friend is Emery, but she becomes very close friends with Roman after he saves her life. She is also close friends with Lukas, Taylor, Sophia, and Grayson.

- Titus Makin Jr. as Lukas Parnell:

Lukas is a 16-year-old boy who lives in Edendale, Louisiana. He is a very intelligent and kind person who excels in technological advances. Lukas has always fought for the Atrians' rights and believes in tolerance, however he starts to get a bit iffy about the Atrians' motives after he is poisoned by black cyper, a poisonous form of the Atrian herb, which was created by the Trags (Atrian terrorists against the humans) to extinguish the human race. Lukas had a crush on Sophia, but they're just friends throughout the series. He is best friends with Emery and close with Julia, Roman, Grayson, Taylor, and Eric.

- Natalie Hall as Taylor Beecham:

Taylor is a 16-year-old girl living in Edendale, Louisiana. She is very much the 'popular socialite' of this show. She forms an intense relationship with Drake, despite the fact that Sophia is interested in her, and ends up pregnant later on in the show. She is close friends with Emery, Lukas, Julia, Grayson, and Roman.

- Chelsea Gilligan as Teri:

Teri is a 16-year-old Atrian who now lives on Earth in a militarized sector with the remaining members of her race. She is very much a rebellious Atrian who despises the humans' intolerance and later becomes a Trag. Teri once had a very serious relationship with Roman until he realized that 'with (you) it's all about mind games' and ended their relationship. Her main enemy in the show is a Emery, due to the fact that Teri distrusts her as a human, and because Emery is in love with Roman. She is friends with Drake and was friends with Roman. In the beginning of the show she constantly was fighting humans that got in her way. Her mother is the leader of the Trags.

- Greg Finley as Drake:

Drake is a 16-year-old Atrian boy who now lives on Earth in a militarized sector with the remaining members of his race. Drake is a very strong, tall Atrian and he is definitely not the passive type. He forms an intense relationship with Taylor, thus resulting in her pregnancy. Drake is best friends with Roman, but also becomes friends with Emery, Julia, and Lukas. He was a Trag but realized he couldn't kill people. His mother was imprisoned in the crate which is the jail for the Sector but later released. His mother is forced to build a doomsday device for the Trags.

- Brina Palencia as Sophia:

Roman's younger Atrian sister who is always curious about humans. After her father's death, she became frustrated with Roman as he was being overprotective of her. She tried to form a relationship with Taylor, but is rejected by her. Lukas also shows affection for her, but she is in love with Taylor. Sophia is close friends with Emery, Drake, Julia, and Lukas. She also loves to swim and later tries to join the school swim team.

=== Recurring and guest ===
- Jonathan Billions as Gloria's Son
- Dora Madison Burge as Zoe
- Jesse Luken as Eric
- Tahmoh Penikett as SEU Officer Jack Beaumont
- Jay Huguley as Ray Whitehill
- Andrea Frankle as Michelle Whitehill
- Susan Walters as Maia
- Jason Douglas as Nox
- Deena Dill as Margaret Montrose
- Tom Hillmann as Mr. Montrose
- Victoria Platt as Gloria Garcia
- Merle Dandridge as Vega
- Louise Lombard as Saroya
- Johnathon Schaech as Castor
- Stephanie Jacobsen as Eva Benton
- Alec Rayme as Sketchy Atrian

== Episodes ==
All the episode titles after the pilot are taken from William Shakespeare's Romeo and Juliet.

| No. | Title | Directed by | Written by | Original release date | Prod. code | US viewers (millions) |
|---|---|---|---|---|---|---|
| 1 | "Pilot" | Gary Fleder | Meredith Averill | February 17, 2014 | 101 | 1.28 |
On September 17, 2014, aliens known as Atrians crash-land on Earth, where humans' hostile reaction provokes them to defend themselves; a battle ensues. A six-year-old Emery finds Roman, an Atrian child who had escaped, hiding in her family's shed. She shelters and befriends him. A short while later, the military finds them and shoots him. Ten years pass. Emery returns to school after spending four years in hospital for immune deficiency. Officials announce that seven Atrians will attend her high school as part of an integration program. To help her terminally ill friend Julia, Emery joins her to hunt for the Atrians' Cyper, a plant rumored to cure the uncurable. They're unsuccessful. Emery learns that Roman, one of the seven Atrian students, is actually the boy from the shed. Eric and his friends attack Roman at school; Roman's friends plan to crash an upcoming party to return the favor. Drake attacks Eric. Police raid the party, but Roman evades them with Emery. In the final scene, Roman uses Cyper to heal Julia's cancer using the secret ingredient – his own blood. His father, Nox, is accidentally killed by Emery's father.
| 2 | "These Violent Delights Have Violent Ends" | Gary Fleder | Meredith Averill | February 24, 2014 | 102 | 1.14 |
An explosion in the Sector injures some human guards. As Roman's family prepares for the funeral, their uncle Castor, visits. He wants to succeed Roman's father, Nox, as leader of the Atrians. Roman declines and asserts his birthright, becoming Iksen (leader) himself. At school, Roman avoids Emery after her father's accidental shooting of his own father. At a school board meeting, Emery defends the Atrians and petitions to allow them to attend the school's homecoming carnival. Roman attends reluctantly to protect Emery, who is being targeted by the Trags, an Atrian extremist group seeking vengeance for Nox's death. At the carnival, Roman stops the Trag assassin and discovers that he's actually an Atrian who's had his markings removed. The assassin, Beaumont, warns him that "they are watching him." Roman yields the Atrian leadership to Castor, but indicates that he does not trust him and won't hesitate to have him deposed.
| 3 | "Our Toil Shall Strive to Mend" | Deran Sarafian | Adele Lim | March 3, 2014 | 103 | 1.12 |
With the tenth anniversary of the Atrians' arrival looming, Gloria arranges for Emery's class to be allowed inside the Sector as a cultural exchange. Despite Roman's objections, Emery participates, and recruits Grayson to document Atrians telling their Arrival Day stories. Roman asks Teri for Vire, a plant to eliminate Julia's side effects from being cured with Cyper. She refuses at first but later acquiesces when he's almost tortured by her mother, Vega – current leader of the Trags. The Vire returns Julia to normal. During the commemoration ceremony, the Red Hawks replace Grayson and Emery's video with one broadcasting a hate-filled message. Roman gives an impromptu speech from the heart, saving the ceremony. Meanwhile, Drake, who has now joined the Trags, is assigned to break into the Atrian starship and retrieve a cube for Vega. Emery discovers that Grayson's parents are actually the leaders of the Red Hawks. Vega reveals that the cube produces Black Cyper, a poison deadly to Atrians and humans alike. She kills Beaumont for being a traitor – he was seen reporting to Castor. Teri joins the Trags, and Gloria is revealed to be mother to an Atrian child.
| 4 | "And Left No Friendly Drop" | Harry Sinclair | Robert Hewitt Wolfe | March 10, 2014 | 104 | 0.99 |
Sector guards ransack Roman's family's pod looking for restricted technology. When the guards leave, Roman's mother reveals she found a cell phone amongst his father's belongings. Roman asks Lukas to try getting any data he can from the phone. They retrieve a single video but are caught by Gloria, who destroys the data chip before they can watch it. Meanwhile, human students learn about Atrian biology – two sets of lungs and the ability to breathe through their skin. Sophia wants to join the swim team; Emery and Grayson support her. The rest of the team eventually agrees. Just before the swim meet begins, a member of the rival team tricks Sophia into ingesting caffeine, a deadly allergen for Atrians. Sophia almost dies, but Emery saves her. The Atrian students and Marshall High swim team brawl with the other team until Gloria arrives with security. The swim meet is cancelled, along with the rest of Marshall's swim season. However, Gloria praises them for fighting alongside each other (for once) against the rival team – it shows they're learning to work together. Emery and Grayson work out their issues and have their first kiss; Roman witnesses it from the Atrian bus. In the final scene, Gloria is watching the video from Nox's phone: it is of bath time with her son – whose father is Nox.
| 5 | "Dreamers Often Lie" | Michael Pressman | Marc Halsey | March 17, 2014 | 105 | 1.00 |
The Atrian Seven are given a full free day in town, outside the Sector. Lukas helps Roman locate the phone his father was secretly communicating with. A handwritten note leads him into the Bayou to find Eljida, a rumored Atrian safe haven. He arrives at a boat dock and summons the gatekeeper. He discovers Gloria following him and confronts her. She reveals that she and his father were lovers. The gatekeeper fails to arrive and Roman leaves dejected, sure that Eljida wasn't real after all. Meanwhile, Emery and Grayson go to a movie, but he leaves her to help Eric and ends up being framed for assault. He and Emery track down the Red Hawk extremists who committed the crime. Drake mistakes Taylor for his Trag contact when he's tasked with delivering the cube weapon to an operative outside the Sector. He and Taylor hook up in a bathroom. The real operative turns out to be her best friend, Zoe. Zoe leads Drake to Beaumont's body, where they plant the cube which causes Black Cyper to grow. Late that night, the gatekeeper arrives to a still-waiting Gloria. For her son's safety, she sends him off to Eljida with the gatekeeper.
| 6 | "Stabbed with a White Wench's Black Eye" | Oz Scott | Yolanda E. Lawrence | March 24, 2014 | 106 | 0.88 |
Zoe foils a Red Hawk plan to bomb the Sector, and learns that Grayson's parents are the leaders of the Red Hawks. Drake passes that intel to Vega, who assigns them to kidnap Grayson at his parents' upcoming charity ball, to get prisoners released. At the ball, Roman confronts Emery about not telling him that she knew about Grayson's parents. He ends up confessing that he does want to be with her, but can't – he has to keep her safe. Later, Roman spots Drake and Zoe dragging Grayson into a car; he tricks Zoe into revealing that she's Atrian. He follows the car and confronts them, forcing Drake to take sides. Drake sides with Roman and almost kills Zoe. They let her go; she says they'll regret it. Meanwhile, a tabloid reporter confronts Emery with video of her and Julia talking about Cyper. She promises to get him a juicier story to prevent him printing that one. After the ball, she leads him to a Red Hawk meeting, where he deploys hidden cameras. Grayson's mother steps onto the stage, unaware she's being recorded. The next morning, she's arrested for planning the bombing. Julia visits Emery at home; Emery shares that she'd rather wait for Roman than be with Grayson. Grayson shows up at Emery's house as well, seeking comfort. Roman arrives at the back door shortly after, but spots the two of them "looking cozy" on the couch and slinks away.
| 7 | "To Seek a Foe" | Ed Ornelas | Jay Faerber | March 31, 2014 | 107 | 1.04 |
Emery comforts Grayson, who plans to confront his mother in jail. Roman and Drake discuss finding Zoe before she gets to Vega about Drake's betrayal. In town, Lukas is poisoned and hospitalized by Black Cyper meant for Taylor, that Zoe planted. Roman and Drake consult with Castor, who shares the cure for Black Cyper poison – a fresh cutting from the plant – and gives Roman a bomb to destroy it. Drake goes to Zoe's house to gather intel to find her, while Roman and Emery follow a clue to a state park to find the plant – the same one once planted in Beaumont's body, which Zoe dug up and moved there. Emery demands to know what's really been going on, what they're up against. Roman tells her everything – that's he's been trying to protect her from all of it. They find the Black Cyper; Zoe's guarding it. Drake shows up in time to fight her, while Emery runs to the plant to get a fresh cutting. She then activates the bomb, which kills Zoe. Roman saves Emery from the blast; they share a passionate kiss. Meanwhile, at the hospital, Eric and Julia bond over trigonometry, her car, and shared worry about Lukas. Grayson goes alone to confront his mother in jail. One of their teachers is revealed to be working at a lab, where tests confirm the presence of Cyper in Julia's blood. That night, Lukas is cured with the fresh cutting. Emery tells Roman she is choosing him over Grayson, and they kiss again. Grayson, out of sight, witnesses it.
| 8 | "An Old Accustom'd Feast" | Michael Zinberg | Brian Studler | April 7, 2014 | 108 | 0.95 |
Roman invites Emery inside the sector to celebrate Dinaskyu, an Atrian holiday that celebrates the family. Emery asks Sophia for tips on how to impress her mother.Vega tells Drake that with Zoe missing, they've tapped him to be their new undercover operative, which means he'll be leaving town and getting his markings removed.When Roman goes to Vega and asks her to reconsider sending Drake away, she offers him a way out. Meanwhile, Eva approaches Julia with an offer. When Julia refuses, Eva takes her mission to a dangerous place. Finally, Grayson confronts Emery about her feelings for Roman.
| 9 | "Some Consequence Yet Hanging in the Stars" | Zetna Fuentes | Samantha Stratton | April 14, 2014 | 109 | 0.76 |
Roman argues with Emery about whether he can trust his uncle Castor. However, when Roman asks his uncle about the day their spaceship crashed, Castor's reaction is far from what he expected. Meanwhile, Grayson tries to remember what happened the night he blacked out, and Taylor throws a "meteor shower" party to spend more time with Drake. Sophia finally makes her move on Taylor. Still unable to deny her feelings for Roman, Teri makes a decision that puts her in grave danger.
| 10 | "What Storm is This That Blows So" | Norman Buckley | Robert Hewitt Wolfe & Yolanda E. Lawrence | April 21, 2014 | 110 | 0.81 |
A hurricane suddenly hits the town and everyone is trapped inside the school. Teri drugs Roman, which leaves him very paranoid and very angry. While drugged he says some very hurtful things to Emery that alter their relationship. Taylor convinces Drake that they should go public as a couple. However, when Grayson overhears the couple talking, he blackmails Drake into breaking up with Taylor. Meanwhile, Julia turns to Emery for help after Eva threatens her. Sophia and Lukas discover that the hurricane might have originated from the crashed Atrian spaceship. Drake's rejection of Taylor brings her closer to Sophia.
| 11 | "Give Me a Torch" | Michael Katleman | Marc Halsey & Jay Faerber | April 28, 2014 | 111 | 0.83 |
Sophia suspects Taylor is pregnant with Drake’s baby. Sophia tells Emery and the two research Atrian pregnancies. Red Hawk extremist Vartan stumbles upon the information and mistakenly believes Emery is pregnant, so he kidnaps her. Vega tasks Teri with finding the Iksen's key, which they need to complete the Suvek. Meanwhile, Roman and Castor testify before the Hwatab about the day the spaceship crashed. Also, Eric shares a pleasant moment with Julia at the school's Winter Dance.
| 12 | "This Trick May Chance to Scathe You" | Elizabeth Allen | Brian Studler & Samantha Stratton | May 5, 2014 | 112 | 0.87 |
After Roman and Drake discover the Trags are building a bomb known as a Suvek, they realize they need help and Turn to an unexpected source — Grayson. Emery enlists Sophia and Lukas to help them smuggle the Suvek out of the sector, which ultimately puts all of them in danger. Meanwhile, Teri continues her mission for her mother, Vega, by helping Castor recover from his wounds while plotting to betray him at the same time.
| 13 | "Passion Lends Them Power" | Ed Omelas | Meredith Averill & Adele Lim | May 12, 2014 | 113 | 0.83 |
After Roman is seriously injured, Emery turns to an unexpected ally (Teri) for help. They use cypher to heal him and, when Teri leaves, Emery and Roman engage in sex for the first time. Meanwhile, Grayson, Drake, Sophia, Lukas, Eric and Julia all join forces to race against the clock to find the stolen Suvek before the Trags can activate it. However, Vega is a step ahead of them and plans to set off the Suvek in the middle of a Mardi Gras parade. Teri is shocked when she overhears Vega ordering the death of her friends and makes the painful decision to turn in her mother and the Trags over to the human authorities. Elsewhere, Gloria discovers Taylor's secret regarding her pregnancy and shares a secret of her own. Roman finally learns about his late father's illegitimate child and receives a warning about what the Suvek can really do. Zoe is revealed to be alive and finally reveals her Atrian origins to Taylor when she stumbles upon the Suvek. In the final confrontation, Roman, Drake, Emery and Grayson lead an assault on the Trags' rooftop position where the Suvek is. In the subsequent shootout all of the Trags, including Zoe, are killed, but Grayson is seriously wounded. Roman deactivates the Suvek, but Zoe activates a back-up trigger before she dies, which sets off the Suvek, creating a pulse shockwave which knocks out all the humans in the area. Taylor is trapped in a car overturned by the shock wave. Roman and Drake then discover that the Suvek is not a bomb, but a beacon that sends a signal to a huge battle fleet of Atrian warships in deep space, positioned just outside the Milky Way Galaxy. The fleet heads for Earth, seeking the source of the signal.

== Development and production ==
The project was originally titled Oxygen while in development at Isla Producciones (in collaboration with Olé). It was then adapted for the American market by Powwow before being acquired by The CW. Star-Crossed premiered on The CW on Monday, February 17, 2014, at 8:00 pm Eastern/7:00 pm Central. The series was picked up for a thirteen-episode season.

The language of the Atrian aliens, called Sondiv, was created for the program by language creator David J. Peterson.

=== Casting ===
In 2013, it was announced that Natalie Hall and Aimee Teegarden landed roles. On February 25, 2013, Grey Damon was cast as Grayson. In February, it was announced that Malese Jow would be joining, playing Julia, a girl who has an illness which may be cured by aliens. On March 5, 2013, Matt Lanter was cast as a co-star opposite Aimee Teegarden. It was announced Tahmoh Penikett will appear as SEU Officer Jack Beaumont Deena Dill was cast as Margaret Montrose along with Johnathon Schaech, who was cast as Castor.

== Reception ==
=== Ratings ===
The pilot episode debuted on The CW on February 17, 2014, drawing an audience of 1.28 million viewers. The second episode "These Violent Delights Have Violent Ends" debuted on February 24, 2014, drawing an audience of 1.14 million viewers. The pilot episode is the most watched episode, drawing an audience of 1.28 million viewers, and the least watched episode, "Some Consequence Yet Hanging in the Stars" aired on April 14, 2014, drawing an audience of 0.76 million viewers.

=== Critical response ===
David Hinckley of the New York Daily News gave the series 4 out of 5 stars, saying "add forbidden love, which can never escape the shadow of potential doom, and Star-Crossed could become both provocative and entertaining." Diana Werts of Newsday gave the series 3 out of 4 stars, saying "Plenty of potential, if Star-Crossed stops talking down to us". Carrie Raisler of The A.V. Club gave the series a positive review. Jeanne Jakle of the San Antonio Express-News gave a positive review, particularly of Aimee Teegarden's performance, saying "Just as she was so heartbreakingly natural as young Julie Taylor, she also comes across refreshingly unpretentious in Star-Crossed — which, actually, may be the best reason of all to watch the CW drama."

Gail Pennington of the St. Louis Post-Dispatch gave the series 2 of 4 stars signaling mixed reviews, saying "Star-Crossed doesn't aim as high as those, Lanter does get a few witty lines ("One of my hearts stopped beating for a few minutes. Luckily I had a backup)" but the tone is mostly dreary and the plot with few exceptions goes precisely where you expect. Only if the romance proves genuinely heart-stopping to young fans (maybe, the same ones who have embraced Reign) will this one be a hit." Robert Lloyd of the Los Angeles Times gave the series a mixed review, saying "It's the usual dance of insiders and outsiders, mean kids and weirdos, of Sharks and Jets, Montagues and Capulets biting their thumbs at one another in the school corridor while one special guy and girl fall in love. There are the good ones and the bad ones, and the bad good ones, and the good bad ones. Adults, as always in these things, are no help at all."

David Wiegand of the San Francisco Chronicle gave it a negative review, writing: "The title is Star-Crossed because it's about an alien boy who falls in love with a human girl, a repurposed 'Romeo and Juliet', without the poetry. Or drama. Or credibility." Robert Bianco, of USA Today, saying "As vapid as it is unoriginal, Star-Crossed is sadly typical of a network that continually underestimates its audience. Teenagers may not be smarter than they were when the WB was at its peak, but it's unlikely they're dumber. So why does CW treat them as if they are?" Matt Roush of TV Guide gave a negative review, saying "Star-Crossed lacks humor, suspense or even heat."

=== Awards and accolades ===
| Year | Award | Category | Nominee(s) | Result |
|---|---|---|---|---|
| 2015 | Teen Film/TV Series International Awards | Best TV Actor : Comedy, Drama or Musical | Matt Lanter | Won |
| 2015 | Teen Film/TV Series International Awards | Best TV Actress : Comedy, Drama or Musical | Aimee Teegarden | Won |
| 2015 | Teen Film/TV Series International Awards | Outstanding Comedy Series, Drama or Musical | Star-Crossed | Nominated |

== Broadcast ==
The series debuted February 18, 2014, on Fox8 in Australia. In the UK, it debuted April 4, 2014, on Sky 1.
