= The Haunting of Bly Manor =

American television miniseries

- Genre: Gothic romance; Drama; Supernatural; Horror
- Created by: Mike Flanagan
- Based on: The Turn of the Screw by Henry James
- Starring: Victoria Pedretti; Oliver Jackson-Cohen; Amelia Eve; T'Nia Miller; Rahul Kohli; Tahirah Sharif; Amelie Bea Smith; Benjamin Evan Ainsworth; Henry Thomas
- Composer: The Newton Brothers
- Country of origin: United States
- Original language: English
- No. of episodes: 9

Production
- Executive producers: Darryl Frank; Justin Falvey; Trevor Macy; Mike Flanagan; Diane Ademu-John
- Producers: Kathy Gilroy; Leah Fong
- Cinematography: James Kniest; Maxime Alexandre
- Editors: Brian Jeremiah Smith; Mike Flanagan
- Running time: 46–66 minutes
- Production companies: Intrepid Pictures; Amblin Television; Paramount Television Studios

Original release
- Network: Netflix
- Release: October 9, 2020

Related
- The Haunting of Hill House

The Haunting of Bly Manor is an American gothic romance supernatural horror drama television miniseries created by Mike Flanagan, and released on Netflix on October 9, 2020. The second entry in Flanagan's anthology series, The Haunting, it mostly acts as an adaptation of the 1898 novella The Turn of the Screw by Henry James, but also includes other elements either based on James' other works or created for the show. It features much of The Haunting of Hill House's crew and some of the same cast, such as Victoria Pedretti, Oliver Jackson-Cohen, Amelia Eve, T'Nia Miller, Rahul Kohli, Tahirah Sharif, Amelie Bea Smith, Benjamin Evan Ainsworth, and Henry Thomas. Although Pedretti, Jackson-Cohen and Thomas returned from the prior series as different characters, as did Kate Siegel, Carla Gugino, and Catherine Parker in recurring roles, the two series' narratives are not connected.

Following a nonlinear narrative, The Haunting of Bly Manor follows the events occurring in the eponymous countryside manor in the United Kingdom, mostly upon the arrival of a young American, hired as an au pair for the two children living at Bly, who is unaware that the manor is haunted. It was released on October 9, 2020, and like its predecessor received positive reviews from critics, who particularly praised the performances of Pedretti and Miller. At the 73rd Primetime Emmy Awards, the series was nominated for Outstanding Sound Editing for a Limited or Anthology Series. At the 1st Critics' Choice Super Awards, it received nominations for Best Horror Series and Best Actress in a Horror Series (Pedretti and Miller). At the 2021 MTV Movie & TV Awards, Pedretti won the award for Most Frightened Performance.

== Synopsis ==
The story tells of a young au pair hired by a man to look after his niece and nephew at the family country house after they fall into his care. Arriving at the Bly estate, she begins to see apparitions that proceed to haunt the premises.

== Cast ==
=== Main ===
- Victoria Pedretti as Danielle "Dani" Clayton, a young American woman hired as an au pair for the children of the wealthy Wingrave family in England. Dani moves to England to escape her traumatic past, and quickly becomes subject to the paranormal happenings of Bly Manor.
  - Elizabeth Allhands as Young Dani
- Oliver Jackson-Cohen as Peter Quint, a former executive assistant to Henry Wingrave who frequently visited Bly Manor before Dani's arrival. His ghost continues to haunt the mansion's grounds.
- Amelia Eve as Jamie Taylor, Bly Manor's dry-witted gardener and Dani's love interest.
  - Carla Gugino as Older Jamie / The Storyteller, who recounts the events of the series to the guests of a wedding in Northern California in 2007.
- T'Nia Miller as Hannah Grose, the housekeeper of Bly Manor who is fiercely protective of the grounds and the Wingrave children.
- Rahul Kohli as Owen Sharma, Bly Manor's cook who frequently spends time away from the grounds to care for his ailing mother.
  - Kamal Khan as Older Owen
- Tahirah Sharif as Rebecca Jessel, Dani's deceased predecessor who began working at Bly Manor a year before Dani's arrival. Rebecca was in a romantic relationship with Peter Quint prior to her death.
- Amelie Bea Smith as Flora Wingrave, the younger child of the late Dominic and Charlotte Wingrave. Flora has a habit of making effigies of the manor's residents, and maintains a large dollhouse modeled after the mansion.
  - Christie Burke as Older Flora / The Bride
  - Alice Comer as Younger Flora
- Benjamin Evan Ainsworth as Miles Wingrave, the eccentric elder Wingrave child who has lived with his sister in Bly Manor ever since his expulsion from a boarding school.
  - Thomas Nicholson as Older Miles / The Bride's Brother
  - Kasen Kelly as Younger Miles
- Henry Thomas as Henry Wingrave, Miles and Flora's estranged uncle who hires Dani as an au pair at Bly Manor.
  - Duncan Fraser as Older Henry / The Father of the Bride

=== Recurring ===
- Alex Essoe as Charlotte Wingrave, Miles and Flora's late mother.
- Matthew Holness as Dominic Wingrave, Miles and Flora's late father and Henry's brother.
- Roby Attal as Edmund "Eddie" O'Mara, Dani's fiancé who died in a car accident prior to her move to London. Eddie's ghost continues to haunt Dani in the present day as a manifestation of the guilt she feels for his death.
  - Daxton Gujral as Young Eddie
- Kate Siegel as Viola Willoughby-Lloyd, heiress and original owner of Bly Manor centuries ago.
  - Daniela Dib as The Lady of the Lake
- Katie Parker as Perdita Willoughby-Lloyd, Viola's younger sister.
- Greg Sestero as the Fiancé / James
- Calix Fraser as Doll Face Ghost
- Liam Raymond Dib as the Plague Doctor

=== Guest ===
- Jim Piddock as Father Stack
- Lynda Boyd as Judy O'Mara, Eddie's mother.
- Teryl Rothery as Karen Clayton, Dani's mother.
- Lizzy McInnerny as Elspeth, Peter's mother.
- Martin McCreadie as Arthur Lloyd, Viola's husband who initially courts Perdita.

== Episodes ==
No.	Title	Directed by	Written by	Original release date
1	"The Great Good Place"	Mike Flanagan	Mike Flanagan	October 9, 2020
In Northern California, 2007, a woman attends a rehearsal dinner for a wedding. There, she tells the story of an au pair, which dates back to 1987 in London. American emigre Dani Clayton is hired by Henry Wingrave to look after his niece and nephew in their manor in Bly. Dani arrives with Owen the cook and meets the children, Miles and Flora; the housekeeper, Hannah Grose; and the gardener, Jamie. Flora warns Dani not to leave her room at night, but Dani ignores this. She finds many talismans spread throughout the manor, one of which belongs to the previous au pair, Rebecca Jessel, who allegedly killed herself. Hannah describes the talismans as a protection for Flora. She sees a man on the parapet. When Dani stumbles on The Lady of the Lake's talisman, she is locked in Flora's cupboard by Miles. She sees a spectre she has seen repeatedly in a mirror in the closet. Dani is let out a few hours later and notices muddy footsteps. When she follows them outside, she sees Miles and Flora staring at her from their windows. Title reference: From Henry James's 1900 short story "The Great Good Place"
2	"The Pupil"	Ciarán Foy	James Flanagan	October 9, 2020
Dani tells the children that while she forgives them for locking her in the closet, she does not believe their story. In a flashback to his days in prep school, Miles exhibits increasingly erratic behavior—picking fights, killing small animals—and he is expelled. It is suggested that Miles wanted to be expelled, as he holds a letter from Flora that says "Come home." In the present, Dani makes the children do the house chores, giving Hannah and Jamie a break. Dani has a panic attack when Flora tries on a pair of broken glasses she finds among Dani's things. Miles acts unnervingly adult-like toward Dani, which creeps her out. While playing a game of hide-and-seek, she discovers a photo of Rebecca and her lover. Her lover is the same apparition she saw on the parapet, and he appears again. Miles falls unconscious and a ghostly figure grins eerily at Miles. Title reference: From Henry James's 1891 short story "The Pupil"
3	"The Two Faces, Part One"	Ciarán Foy	Diane Ademu-John	October 9, 2020
A flashback to a year before reveals that the ghost whom Dani saw earlier is Peter Quint, who works with Henry and meets Rebecca Jessel when she interviews for the au pair position. They begin a relationship. Flora gifts Rebecca the doll she made of her. Peter becomes possessive of Rebecca and jealous of Rebecca's interactions with Owen. The photo that Dani found is revealed to have been taken by Peter in the off-limits wing of the house, and that Hannah disapproved of their relationship. In the present, the police fail to find Peter on the grounds. Assuming Peter is alive, the adults deduce that Peter may not know Rebecca is dead and may be stalking the grounds. Flora is found by the lake in the morning, staring at Rebecca's ghost. At story time, Miles presents a story about puppets who forgot their maker and mocked him. They receive a call and learn that Owen's mother has died. Dani has a panic attack once again and screams as she sees the same spectre appear before her. Title reference: From Henry James's 1900 short story "The Two Faces"
4	"The Way It Came"	Liam Gavin	Laurie Penny	October 9, 2020
In flashbacks, Dani is engaged to her childhood friend Edmund. One night, during a date, Edmund realizes Dani does not want to marry him and the two fight in the car. As Edmund exits the car angrily, a truck runs him over and kills him. A traumatized Dani sees Edmund's spectre for the first time at the hospital and plans to leave the country without telling anyone. Edmund's mother gives Dani Edmund's glasses before she leaves. At Bly Manor, Dani joins the house staff at a bonfire after Owen's mother's funeral. Jamie initiates a traditional remembrance of the deceased, "throwing bones into the fire", but Dani does not participate. Dani and Jamie fall in love. Dani later awakens in a drunken stupor, but Flora notices the faceless doll in her dollhouse. The children prevent her from seeing a white-clad female spirit wandering the manor. After putting the children to bed, Dani burns Edmund's glasses. Title reference: From Henry James's 1896 short story "The Way It Came"
5	"The Altar of the Dead"	Liam Gavin	Angela LaManna	October 9, 2020
Hannah flashes back and forth between events at different points in time, some real and some imaginary: the day she interviewed Owen for the cook position; the night of the bonfire when he offers to take her to Paris; and the time of Rebecca's employment at the manor, when Hannah caught Peter stealing from the Wingraves. One night, Peter is killed by the "Lady in the Lake", the faceless white-clad ghost who tracks mud into the house. Reincarnating as a ghost, he discovers he can possess Miles. Hannah sees Miles speaking to Peter. Peter then possesses Miles and shoves Hannah down the well, killing her. Dani arrives at the manor after, revealing that Hannah was killed right at that moment and has unwittingly been a ghost since Dani's arrival. The episode ends at the bonfire, where Hannah agrees to go to Paris with Owen, only to see him toasting her goodbye as he leaves with Jamie. Title reference: From Henry James's 1895 short story "The Altar of the Dead"
6	"The Jolly Corner"	Yolanda Ramke & Ben Howling	Rebecca Leigh Klingel	October 9, 2020
Flashbacks reveal that Henry was having an affair with his brother Dominic's wife Charlotte before their deaths and is Flora's biological father. After deducing this, Dominic cuts ties with Henry, reasserting himself as Flora's father and forbidding Henry to contact the family. Dominic and Charlotte travel to India in an attempt to save their marriage, but are killed there in an accident. In the present, Henry drinks heavily and refuses to answer Dani's calls when Flora behaves strangely and sleepwalks. At night, he calls the manor hoping Flora will answer but hangs up when anybody else does. Flora repeatedly "dream hops", flashing back to the past in dreams about Charlotte and the ghost of a faceless child in her room. She speaks to Rebecca's ghost, who visits her at night and is the cause of these occurrences. Dani ends up seeing Rebecca and Peter's ghosts. As she tries to flee with Flora, Miles knocks Dani unconscious. Title reference: From Henry James's 1908 short story "The Jolly Corner"
7	"The Two Faces, Part Two"	Yolanda Ramke & Ben Howling	The Clarkson Twins	October 9, 2020
In flashbacks, Peter learns the mechanics of being a ghost at Bly Manor; he is able to possess the living temporarily, but can do so permanently if he is invited. If a ghost remains in Bly Manor for too long, they will lose their face along with their sense of self. As a ghost, Peter convinces Rebecca they can be together forever if she invites him to possess her. Rebecca agrees but Peter walks into the lake in her body, drowning her and rendering her a ghost as well. Rebecca is horrified and feels betrayed but Peter convinces her that using the same method, they can permanently possess Miles and Flora, letting them start new lives together. In the present, the two ghosts and the children take Dani to the attic while the ghosts enact their plan. The children let the ghosts possess them permanently. When Hannah calls out to them, Peter, as Miles, leads her to the well where he killed her, forcing her to accept that she is a ghost. Flora reveals that she and Rebecca only pretended to carry out the possession and Rebecca's ghost is still separate. Dani once again attempts to escape with Flora but is attacked by the Lady in the Lake. Title reference: From Henry James's 1900 short story "The Two Faces"
8	"The Romance of Certain Old Clothes"	Axelle Carolyn	Leah Fong	October 9, 2020
Centuries ago, the owner of Bly Manor, Willoughby, dies, orphaning his two daughters, Viola and Perdita. Viola marries their distant cousin, Arthur Lloyd, to Perdita's chagrin, who has feelings for Lloyd. After having a daughter Isabel, Viola falls ill with a lung disease. She refuses her last rites, insisting she "will not leave". She becomes bitter and angry as her disease worsens, and she is isolated from the family, frequently searching for her daughter. Perdita, no longer able to tolerate her sister's worsening condition, smothers Viola to death and marries Arthur herself. Viola's spirit is trapped in a chest in the manor, filled with dresses and jewelry she once owned and had bequeathed to Isabel. Arthur's finances dwindle and, at risk of losing the house, Perdita opens the chest, hoping to sell Isabel's inheritance to keep them afloat. Viola's spirit kills Perdita. Finding Perdita's corpse, Arthur fears the chest is cursed and sinks it into the lake on the property before leaving with Isabel. Viola becomes the Lady in the Lake, searching the manor for her daughter at night, and killing anyone in her path, as well as trapping those who die on the grounds. Her memory fades along with her face over the centuries. Title reference: From Henry James's 1868 short story "The Romance of Certain Old Clothes"
9	"The Beast in the Jungle"	E. L. Katz	Julia Bicknell	October 9, 2020
As Viola drags Dani by the throat, she is intercepted by Flora. Flora reminds Viola of Isabel so she takes Flora to the lake to drown her. Dani saves Flora by letting Viola's ghost permanently inhabit her body, releasing all the previously trapped souls that had died in the house over the centuries. Henry returns to Bly Manor to raise the children as his own; Owen and Jamie find Hannah's body in the well. Dani and Jamie leave for America to start a life together. After nine years, Dani starts to see Viola's reflection and worries her appearance may harm Jamie. During their visit to Owen's restaurant in France, he reveals that Flora and Miles do not recall the events at Bly Manor and only have happy memories. Dani wakes one night with her hand around Jamie's neck. Not wanting to risk Jamie's life, Dani returns to Bly Manor and drowns herself in the lake, taking Viola's place. The storyteller, now revealed to be a middle-aged Jamie, ends the story and enjoys the wedding reception of a now grown-up Flora, with Miles, Owen, and Henry. Back in her hotel room, Jamie waits by the door, hoping to reunite with Dani's ghost, who watches over her as she falls asleep, with a hand on her shoulder. Title reference: From Henry James's 1903 novella The Beast in the Jungle

== Production ==
=== Development ===
In an interview with Entertainment Weekly in October 2018, on the topic of The Haunting of Hill House, Flanagan said, "I don't want to speculate too much about season two until Netflix, Paramount and Amblin let us know if they want one. What I will say, though, is that as far as I've ever been concerned with this, the story of the Crain family is told. It's done."

On February 21, 2019, Netflix announced a follow-up series to Hill House. Titled The Haunting of Bly Manor, it is based on The Turn of the Screw by Henry James. Though it would serve as a follow-up series to The Haunting of Hill House, it is a standalone story, indicating that there would be "no dramatic link between The Haunting of Bly Manor and its predecessor." Although the prominent source for the adaptation is The Turn of the Screw, the season also adapts (some more loosely) multiple James works, including "The Romance of Certain Old Clothes" and "The Jolly Corner".

=== Casting ===
Victoria Pedretti and Oliver Jackson-Cohen return as new characters: Pedretti in the role of Dani, "a governess who takes care of two very unusual children", and Jackson-Cohen portrays Peter, "a charming fellow". Henry Thomas, Carla Gugino, Kate Siegel, and Catherine Parker also returned for Bly Manor.

=== Filming ===
The Haunting of Bly Manor entered production on September 30, 2019, filming in Vancouver, Canada. Filming wrapped on February 21, 2020, less than a month before the response to the COVID-19 pandemic shut down much of North America.

== Reception ==
=== Reviews ===
On review aggregator Rotten Tomatoes, 88% of 104 critics positively reviewed The Haunting of Bly Manor, and the average rating is 7.4/10. The critical consensus reads, "It may not be as scary as its predecessor, but with plenty of spooky tricks inside its haunted halls and a strong sense of heart, The Haunting of Bly Manor is another solid entry into Mike Flanagan's growing horrorography." At Metacritic, the series received a weighted average score of 63 out of 100 based on 18 critics, indicating "generally favorable reviews".

=== Awards ===
Year	Award	Category	Recipient	Result	Ref.
2021	Bram Stoker Awards	Superior Achievement in a Screenplay	Angela LaManna (for "The Altar of the Dead")	Nominated	
2021	Critics' Choice Super Awards	Best Horror Series	The Haunting of Bly Manor	Nominated	
2021	Critics' Choice Super Awards	Best Actress in a Horror Series	T'Nia Miller	Nominated	
2021	Critics' Choice Super Awards	Best Actress in a Horror Series	Victoria Pedretti	Nominated	
2021	GLAAD Media Awards	Outstanding Limited or Anthology Series	The Haunting of Bly Manor	Nominated	
2021	MTV Movie & TV Awards	Most Frightened Performance	Victoria Pedretti	Won	
2021	Primetime Emmy Awards	Outstanding Sound Editing for a Limited or Anthology Series	"The Two Faces (Part Two)"	Nominated	
2021	Satellite Awards	Best Television Series – Genre	The Haunting of Bly Manor	Won	
2021	Saturn Awards	Best Television Presentation (under 10 Episodes)	The Haunting of Bly Manor	Nominated	

== See also ==
- Other adaptations of The Turn of the Screw
