= Bram Stoker Award for Best Screenplay =

Horror screenwriting award

- Awarded for: "Superior achievement" in horror writing for best screenplay
- Sponsored by: Horror Writers Association (HWA)
- Date: Annually

The Bram Stoker Award for Best Screenplay is an award presented by the Horror Writers Association (HWA) for "superior achievement" in horror writing for best screenplay.

== Winners and nominees ==
This category existed between 1998 and 2004. It was reintroduced in 2011. Nominees are listed below the winner(s) for each year.

=== Original run ===
Year	Nominated Film / Series	Screenwriter	Result	Ref
1998	Dark City	Alex Proyas	Won (tie)	
1998	Gods and Monsters	Bill Condon	Won (tie)	
1998	Fallen	Nicholas Kazan	Nominated	
1998	Millennium (Season 2, Episode 21: "Somehow, Satan Got Behind Me")	Darin Morgan	Nominated	
1999	The Sixth Sense	M. Night Shyamalan	Won	
1999	The Blair Witch Project	Daniel Myrick and Eduardo Sánchez	Nominated	
1999	Buffy the Vampire Slayer (Season 4, Episode 10: "Hush")	Joss Whedon	Nominated	
1999	The Green Mile	Frank Darabont	Nominated	
2000	Shadow of the Vampire	Steven Katz	Won	
2000	The Cell	Mark Protosevich	Nominated	
2000	Pitch Black	David Twohy, Ken Wheat, and Jim Wheat	Nominated	
2000	Requiem for a Dream	Darren Aronofsky and Hubert Selby Jr.	Nominated	
2000	Unbreakable	M. Night Shyamalan	Nominated	
2001	Memento	Christopher Nolan and Jonathan Nolan	Won	
2001	From Hell	Terry Hayes and Rafael Yglesias (based on the graphic novel by Alan Moore and Eddie Campbell)	Nominated	
2001	The Lord of the Rings: The Fellowship of the Ring	Philippa Boyens, Peter Jackson, and Fran Walsh (based on the novel by J. R. R. Tolkien)	Nominated	
2001	The Others	Alejandro Amenábar	Nominated	
2002	Frailty	Brent Hanley	Won	
2002	Minority Report	Jon Cohen and Scott Frank (based on the story by Philip K. Dick)	Nominated	
2002	The Ring	Ehren Kruger (based on the novel by Koji Suzuki and film by Hiroshi Takahashi)	Nominated	
2002	Signs	M. Night Shyamalan	Nominated	
2003	Bubba Ho-Tep	Don Coscarelli	Won	
2003	Identity	Michael Cooney	Nominated	
2003	Pirates of the Caribbean: The Curse of the Black Pearl	Ted Elliott and Terry Rossio	Nominated	
2004	Eternal Sunshine of the Spotless Mind	Charlie Kaufman, Michel Gondry, and Pierre Bismuth	Won (tie)	
2004	Shaun of the Dead	Simon Pegg and Edgar Wright	Won (tie)	
2004	Dawn of the Dead	James Gunn	Nominated	
2004	Hellboy	Guillermo del Toro	Nominated	

=== 2011–present ===
Year	Nominated Film / Series	Screenwriter	Result	Ref
2011	American Horror Story: Murder House (Season 1, Episode 12: "Afterbirth")	Jessica Sharzer	Won	
2011	The Adjustment Bureau	George Nolfi	Nominated	
2011	Priest	Cory Goodman	Nominated	
2011	True Blood (Season 4, Episode 8: "Spellbound")	Alan Ball	Nominated	
2011	The Walking Dead (Season 2, Episode 7: "Pretty Much Dead Already")	Scott M. Gimple	Nominated	
2011	The Walking Dead (Season 2, Episode 3: "Save the Last One")	Scott M. Gimple	Nominated	
2012	The Cabin in the Woods	Joss Whedon and Drew Goddard	Won	
2012	American Horror Story: Asylum (Season 2, Episode 7: "Dark Cousin")	Tim Minear	Nominated	
2012	The Hunger Games	Gary Ross, Suzanne Collins, and Billy Ray	Nominated	
2012	The Walking Dead (Season 3, Episode 4: "Killer Within")	Sang Kyu Kim	Nominated	
2012	The Woman in Black	Jane Goldman	Nominated	
2013	The Walking Dead (Season 3, Episode 16: "Welcome to the Tombs")	Glen Mazzara	Won	
2013	American Horror Story: Asylum (Season 2, Episode 11: "Spilt Milk")	Brad Falchuk	Nominated	
2013	Dracula (Episode: "A Whiff of Sulfur")	Daniel Knauf	Nominated	
2013	Hannibal (Episode: "Apéritif")	Bryan Fuller	Nominated	
2013	The Returned (Season 1, Episode 8: "The Horde")	Frédéric Adda and Fabrice Gobert	Nominated	
2014	The Babadook	Jennifer Kent	Won	
2014	American Horror Story: Coven (Season 3, Episode 10: "The Magical Delights of Stevie Nicks")	James Wong	Nominated	
2014	Doctor Who (Series 8, Episode 4: "Listen")	Steven Moffat	Nominated	
2014	Penny Dreadful (Season 1, Episode 2: "Séance")	John Logan	Nominated	
2014	The Walking Dead (Season 4, Episode 14: "The Grove")	Scott M. Gimple	Nominated	
2015	It Follows	David Robert Mitchell	Won	
2015	Crimson Peak	Guillermo del Toro and Matthew Robbins	Nominated	
2015	Penny Dreadful (Season 2, Episode 9: "And Hell Itself My Only Foe")	John Logan	Nominated	
2015	Penny Dreadful (Season 2, Episode 3: "The Nightcomers")	John Logan	Nominated	
2015	What We Do in the Shadows	Jemaine Clement and Taika Waititi	Nominated	
2016	The Witch	Robert Eggers	Won	
2016	10 Cloverfield Lane	Josh Campbell, Damien Chazelle, and Matthew Stuecken	Nominated	
2016	Penny Dreadful (Season 3, Episode 4: "A Blade of Grass")	John Logan	Nominated	
2016	Stranger Things (Season 1, Episode 1: "Chapter One: The Vanishing of Will Byers")	The Duffer Brothers	Nominated	
2016	Stranger Things (Season 1, Episode 8: "Chapter Eight: The Upside Down")	The Duffer Brothers	Nominated	
2017	Get Out	Jordan Peele	Won	
2017	It	Chase Palmer, Cary Fukunaga, and Gary Dauberman	Nominated	
2017	The Shape of Water	Guillermo del Toro and Vanessa Taylor	Nominated	
2017	Stranger Things (Season 2, Episode 1: "Chapter One: MADMAX")	The Duffer Brothers	Nominated	
2017	Twin Peaks (Season 3, Episode 8: "Part 8")	Mark Frost and David Lynch	Nominated	
2018	The Haunting of Hill House (Season 1, Episode 5: "The Bent-Neck Lady")	Meredith Averill	Won	
2018	Annihilation	Alex Garland	Nominated	
2018	Bird Box	Eric Heisserer	Nominated	
2018	Hereditary	Ari Aster	Nominated	
2018	A Quiet Place	Bryan Woods, Scott Beck, and John Krasinski	Nominated	
2019	Us	Jordan Peele	Won	
2019	Doctor Sleep	Mike Flanagan	Nominated	
2019	The Lighthouse	Robert Eggers and Max Eggers	Nominated	
2019	Midsommar	Ari Aster	Nominated	
2019	Stranger Things (Season 3, Episode 8: "Chapter Eight: The Battle of Starcourt")	Matt Duffer and Ross Duffer	Nominated	
2020	The Invisible Man	Leigh Whannell (Universal Pictures, Blumhouse Productions, Goalpost Pictures, Nervous Tick Productions)	Won	
2020	Color Out of Space	Scarlett Amaris and Richard Stanley (SpectreVision)	Nominated	
2020	Lovecraft Country (Season 1, Episode 1: "Sundown")	Misha Green (Affeme, Monkeypaw Productions, Bad Robot Productions, Warner Bros. Television Studios)	Nominated	
2020	Lovecraft Country (Season 1, Episode 8: "Jig-a-Bobo")	Misha Green and Ihuoma Ofordire (Affeme, Monkeypaw Productions, Bad Robot Productions, Warner Bros. Television Studios)	Nominated	
2020	The Haunting of Bly Manor (Season 1, Episode 5: "The Altar of the Dead")	Angela LaManna (Intrepid Pictures, Amblin Television, Paramount Television Studios)	Nominated	
2021	Midnight Mass (Season 1, Episode 6: "Book VI: Acts of the Apostles")	Mike Flanagan, James Flanagan, and Jeff Howard (Intrepid Pictures)	Won	
2021	Antlers	C. Henry Chaisson, Nick Antosca, and Scott Cooper (Searchlight Pictures)	Nominated	
2021	Candyman	Jordan Peele, Win Rosenfeld, and Nia DaCosta (Universal Pictures)	Nominated	
2021	Fear Street: Part One – 1994	Phil Graziadei and Leigh Janiak (Chernin Entertainment)	Nominated	
2021	Squid Game (Season 1, Episode 1: "Red Light, Green Light")	Hwang Dong-hyuk (Siren Pictures)	Nominated	
2022	The Black Phone	Scott Derrickson & C. Robert Cargill	Won (tie)	
2022	Stranger Things (Season 4, Episode 1: "Chapter One: The Hellfire Club")	The Duffer Brothers	Won (tie)	
2022	The Pale Blue Eye	Scott Cooper	Nominated	
2022	Men	Alex Garland	Nominated	
2022	Pearl	Mia Goth & Ti West	Nominated	
2023	Godzilla Minus One	Takashi Yamazaki	Won	
2023	Black Mirror (Season 6, Episode 3: "Beyond the Sea")	Charlie Brooker	Nominated	
2023	Huesera: The Bone Woman	Michelle Garza Cervera & Abia Castillo	Nominated	
2023	No One Will Save You	Brian Duffield	Nominated	
2023	When Evil Lurks	Demián Rugna	Nominated	
2024	The Substance	Coralie Fargeat	Winner	
2024	Nosferatu	Robert Eggers, Henrik Galeen, & Bram Stoker	Nominated	
2024	Heretic	Scott Beck & Bryan Wood	Nominated	
2024	Longlegs	Osgood Perkins	Nominated	
2024	I Saw the TV Glow	Jane Schoenbrun	Nominated	
2025	Sinners	Ryan Coogler	Winner	
2025	Weapons	Zach Cregger	Finalist	
2025	28 Years Later	Alex Garland	Finalist	
2025	Companion	Drew Hancock	Finalist	
2025	Bring Her Back	Danny Philippou & Bill Hinzman	Finalist	
