= Meredith Averill =

American television writer and producer

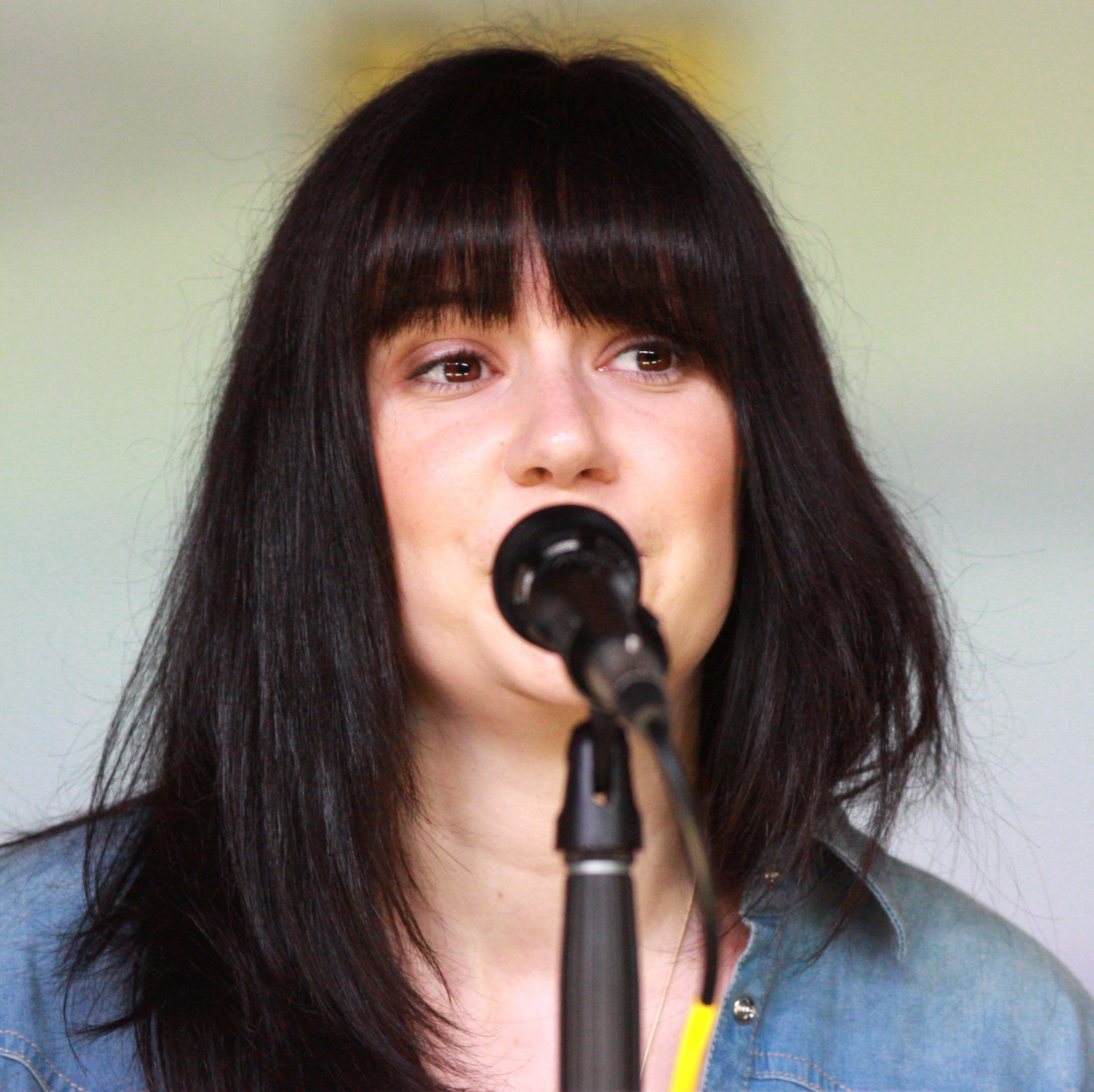
- Born: Pottsville, Pennsylvania, U.S.
- Occupations: Screenwriter; Producer
- Years active: 2008–present
- Known for: Star-Crossed; The Good Wife; The Haunting of Hill House

Meredith Averill is an American television writer and producer. Born in Pottsville, Pennsylvania, Averill graduated from New York University with a degree in screenwriting.

== Career ==
Averill began her career as an assistant to TV writer/producers André Nemec and Josh Appelbaum, then became a writer for the ABC Family mini-series Samurai Girl, ABC's Life on Mars and ABC's Happy Town. Averill then spent three years on CBS's The Good Wife as a writer and producer.

In May 2013 she signed an overall deal with CBS Television Studios, where she was the creator and executive producer of The CW science fiction teen drama Star-Crossed.

After Star-Crossed's cancellation, she then went on to work as a Co-Executive Producer for the CW's Jane the Virgin and CBS's Pure Genius. She served as the co-showrunner/executive producer for Netflix's series The Haunting of Hill House.

In 2018, Averill came on board as the Co-Showrunner/Executive Producer for Netflix's adaptation of Locke & Key, which she developed for television along with Carlton Cuse and Aron Eli Coleite.

In December 2020, Netflix announced it had picked up Locke & Key for a second and third season and signed Averill to a three-year overall deal.

In May 2023, Netflix extended Averill's overall deal and she joined Wednesday as an Executive Producer for its second season.

In October 2025, Amazon announced Averill as the showrunner for their adaptation of the best-selling romantasy book series, Fourth Wing. In May 2026, this project was greenlit to series.

== Filmography ==
=== Television ===
The numbers in writing credits refer to the number of episodes.

Title	Year	Credited as			Network	Notes
Title	Year	Creator	Writer	Executive Producer	Network	Notes
October Road	2007–08	No	No	No	ABC	Assistant to Showrunners (season 2)
Samurai Girl	2008	No	Yes (2)	No	ABC Family	
Life on Mars	2008–09	No	Yes (3)	No	ABC	Staff Writer
Happy Town	2010	No	Yes (1)	No	ABC	Story editor (6 episodes)
The Good Wife	2010–13	No	Yes (9)	No	CBS	Story editor (season 2; 11 episodes); Executive story editor (season 2; 12 episodes); Co-producer (season 3); Producer (season 4)
Star-Crossed	2014	Yes	Yes (3)	Yes	The CW	Co-Showrunner
Jane the Virgin	2014–15	No	Yes (3)	No	The CW	Co-executive producer (season 1)
American Gothic	2016	No	Yes (1)	No	CBS	
Pure Genius	2016–17	No	Yes (2)	No	CBS	Co-executive producer (4 episodes)
Gone	2017	No	Yes (1)	No	TF1; VOX	
The Haunting of Hill House	2018	No	Yes (2)	Yes	Netflix	Co-Showrunner
الآنسة فرح (Miss Farah)	2019–20	No	Yes (3)	No	MBC 4	Arabic-language remake of Jane the Virgin; based on the Episode 3, 10 and 18, Written by (season 1)
Locke & Key	2020–2022	Developer	Yes (6)	Yes	Netflix	Co-Showrunner
Wednesday	2025	No	No	Yes	Netflix	

== Awards ==
Averill is a two-time Golden Globe nominee and a four-time nominee of the Writers Guild of America Award. She was chosen as one of Variety's Top 10 TV Writers to Watch for 2013. In 2019, she was awarded the Bram Stoker Award for Superior Achievement in a Screenplay for an episode of The Haunting of Hill House she wrote entitled "The Bent-Neck Lady".
