= The Haunting of Hill House (TV series) =

American television miniseries

- Genre: Drama; Supernatural; Horror
- Created by: Mike Flanagan
- Based on: The Haunting of Hill House by Shirley Jackson
- Directed by: Mike Flanagan
- Starring: Michiel Huisman; Carla Gugino; Henry Thomas; Elizabeth Reaser; Oliver Jackson-Cohen; Kate Siegel; Victoria Pedretti; Lulu Wilson; Mckenna Grace; Paxton Singleton; Julian Hilliard; Violet McGraw; Timothy Hutton
- Composer: The Newton Brothers
- Country of origin: United States
- Original language: English
- No. of episodes: 10

Production
- Executive producers: Meredith Averill; Darryl Frank; Justin Falvey; Trevor Macy; Mike Flanagan
- Producer: Dan Kaplow
- Cinematography: Michael Fimognari
- Editors: Jim Flynn; Brian Jeremiah Smith; Mike Flanagan; Ravi Subramanian
- Running time: 42–71 minutes
- Production companies: FlanaganFilm; Amblin Television; Paramount Television

Original release
- Network: Netflix
- Release: October 12, 2018

Related
- The Haunting of Bly Manor

The Haunting of Hill House is an American supernatural horror drama television miniseries created and directed by Mike Flanagan, produced by Amblin Television and Paramount Television for Netflix, and serves as the first entry in an anthology series, The Haunting. It is loosely based on the 1959 novel by Shirley Jackson. The plot alternates between two timelines, following five adult siblings whose paranormal experiences at Hill House continue to haunt them in the present day, and flashbacks depicting events leading up to the eventful night in 1992 when the family fled from the mansion. The ensemble cast features Michiel Huisman, Elizabeth Reaser, Oliver Jackson-Cohen, Kate Siegel, and Victoria Pedretti as the siblings in adulthood, with Carla Gugino and Henry Thomas as parents Olivia and Hugh Crain, and Timothy Hutton appearing as an older version of Hugh.

The series premiered on Netflix on October 12, 2018. The Haunting of Hill House received critical acclaim, particularly for its acting, directing, and production values. A follow-up series by Flanagan titled The Haunting of Bly Manor, with most of the same crew and some of the same cast but a different story and characters, was released on October 9, 2020.

== Synopsis ==
In the summer of 1992, Hugh and Olivia Crain and their five children—Steven, Shirley, Theodora (Theo), Luke, and Eleanor (Nell)—move into Hill House to renovate the mansion in order to sell it and build their own house, designed by Olivia. However, due to unexpected repairs, they have to stay longer, and they begin to experience increasing paranormal phenomena, resulting in a tragic loss and the family fleeing from the house. Twenty-six years later, the Crain siblings and their estranged father reunite after another tragedy strikes them, and they are forced to confront how their time in Hill House has affected each of them.

== Cast and characters ==
=== Main ===
- Michiel Huisman and Paxton Singleton as Steven Crain (adult and child, respectively), the eldest son of the family. He became a famous author after writing about his family's experiences at Hill House, despite his siblings' disapproval.
- Carla Gugino as Olivia Crain, the matriarch of the family, who designs houses. She, along with her youngest daughter Nell, is among the most affected by the paranormal activity in the house.
- Timothy Hutton and Henry Thomas as Hugh Crain (older and younger, respectively), the patriarch of the family, who flips houses. He becomes estranged from his children after the events at Hill House.
- Elizabeth Reaser and Lulu Wilson as Shirley Crain Harris (adult and child, respectively), the eldest daughter of the family. She owns a mortuary with her husband Kevin. They have a son and a daughter.
- Oliver Jackson-Cohen and Julian Hilliard as Luke Crain (adult and child, respectively), older twin of Nell and one of the two youngest members of the family. He struggles with heroin addiction as an adult to push out his memories of Hill House.
- Kate Siegel and Mckenna Grace as Theodora "Theo" Crain (adult and child, respectively), the middle child of the five, and a child psychologist. "Sensitive" like her mother, she wears gloves to prevent touching other people and experiencing psychic knowledge about them.
- Victoria Pedretti and Violet McGraw as Eleanor "Nell" Crain Vance (adult and child, respectively), Luke's younger twin and one of the two youngest members of the family. She has never fully recovered from the haunting she experienced while living in Hill House.

=== Recurring ===
- Annabeth Gish as Clara Dudley. She and her husband are the caretakers of the house and help the Crains in their efforts to renovate the mansion.
- Robert Longstreet as Horace Dudley, married to Clara Dudley. They both live close to the mansion while they act as caretakers for the property.
- Anthony Ruivivar as Kevin Harris, Shirley's husband.
- Samantha Sloyan as Leigh Crain, Steven's wife.
- Levy Tran as Trish Park, Theo's lover.
- James Lafferty as Ryan Quale, an apparition from Shirley's memory.
- James Flanagan as Funeral Director
- Jordane Christie as Arthur Vance, Nell's sleep technologist and later husband.
- Elizabeth Becka as Aunt Janet, sister of Olivia Crain.
- Logan Medina as Jayden Harris, son of Shirley and Kevin.
- May Badr as Allie Harris, daughter of Shirley and Kevin.
- Anna Enger as Joey, a recovering addict that Luke tries to help.
- Fedor Steer as William Hill, former owner of Hill House who went insane and bricked himself behind a wall. His ghost returns as the Tall Man / Bowler Hat Man who haunts Luke.
- Olive Elise Abercrombie as Abigail Dudley, young Luke's friend from the woods.
- Catherine Parker as Poppy Hill, one of the ghosts inhabiting Hill House, wife of William Hill and considered insane when alive.
- Mimi Gould as Hazel Hill, one of the ghosts inhabiting Hill House

== Episodes ==
No.	Title	Directed by	Written by	Original release date
1	"Steven Sees a Ghost"	Mike Flanagan	Teleplay by : Mike Flanagan	October 12, 2018
Steven Crain is an author known for The Haunting of Hill House, an autobiographical novel about his childhood experience while residing in the haunted mansion with parents Hugh and Olivia, and younger siblings Shirley, Theo, Nell and Luke. During their stay, the Crains encounter paranormal occurrences and are forced to flee without Olivia, who dies within the house, traumatizing the rest of the family. Years later, Steven uses his family's traumatic experiences to write his book, straining the bonds with his siblings. Although it becomes a best-seller, he misses most of the frightening experiences and does not actually believe in the paranormal. Theo meets a woman, Trish, at a nightclub and brings her home to have sex. Steven and Shirley miss calls from Nell, who then calls Hugh and expresses concern for Luke, who has become a drug addict. When Steven returns home, he finds Luke attempting to steal from him and gives him money instead. In his apartment he encounters Nell standing in a corner. He receives a call from Hugh, informing him that Nell went to Hill House and is dead. Steven realizes that he is seeing a ghost.
2	"Open Casket"	Mike Flanagan	Mike Flanagan	October 12, 2018
In childhood flashbacks at Hill House, Shirley encounters a box of abandoned kittens and takes them in. However, the kittens all end up dying, which deeply affects Shirley, who obsesses over why she could not fix them. Later, during Olivia's funeral, an initially distraught Shirley is in awe that the mortician was able to "fix" her mother and return her previous beauty. As an adult, Shirley is a mortician who owns a funeral business alongside her husband, Kevin, and rents a guesthouse to Theo, who is now a child therapist. Shirley is informed of Nell's death. Distraught, she decides to embalm and "fix" her sister herself. However, while doing so, she encounters her mother's ghost.
3	"Touch"	Mike Flanagan	Liz Phang	October 12, 2018
Theo is able to perceive feelings from people and impressions from objects when she touches them with bare hands. During their childhood in the house, Luke once begs her to let him ride in the dumbwaiter up to the top floor. When Theo presses the up button, the dumbwaiter instead goes down and Luke encounters a ghost that attacks him and is upset that the adults do not believe him. Theo investigates for him and finds a hidden trapdoor leading to a basement that is not in the plans of the house. Olivia reveals to her that her grandmother was "sensitive" just like her and gives Theo a pair of gloves to protect her hands. At her job, adult Theo comes across a child that she cannot "read", who claims to be tormented by "Mr. Smiley", a monster. Theo goes to the girl's house and discovers the truth: the girl's foster dad is molesting her and Mr. Smiley is a manifestation of the abuse. Theo gets the foster dad arrested. She then goes to the morgue and touches Nell's forehead before collapsing and screaming. A flashback to their last night in Hill House reveals that when Hugh grabbed Theo as they were trying to flee, Theo saw disturbing images of ghosts and Olivia being pushed, with her head hitting a wall.
4	"The Twin Thing"	Mike Flanagan	Scott Kosar	October 12, 2018
Child Luke is frustrated as only Theo believes him about the ghosts he sees, including his "imaginary friend", Abigail. Luke claims a bowler hat his mother finds in the attic and wears it. Present Luke is now 90 days clean. Since birth, Luke and Nell are able to feel the other's physical ailments. Luke's best friend in rehab, Joey, flees to get high, and Luke follows to get her back. Child Luke encounters the ghost of an abnormally tall man that comes to get its bowler hat back from him. Luke finds Joey but begins feeling unnaturally cold and stiff. Lacking money for a place to stay, Luke breaks into Steven's apartment to steal items to sell but is caught by Steven, who gives him money. Joey steals the money and flees, and Luke is mugged, leaving him wandering with the hatted ghost following him. Luke calls his caseworker and she and Steven find him and inform him that Nell died by suicide. Realizing he has been feeling Nell in death all this time, Luke states it was not suicide.
5	"The Bent-Neck Lady"	Mike Flanagan	Meredith Averill	October 12, 2018
Child Nell is tormented by an apparition she calls the Bent-Neck Lady, a ghost with a broken neck. Adult Nell sees a sleep technologist, Arthur, for sleep paralysis. The two fall in love and marry. But during their first year of marriage, Arthur suffers a brain aneurysm and dies, as the Bent-Neck Lady returns. Nell stops using her medication, believing that it makes her see the Lady. Convinced by her therapist that Hill House is "just a carcass" of a house and not the haunted nightmare of her past, Nell travels to the house. She sees it as it was in her childhood, fully renovated, with her family and Arthur present. However, the house is actually desolate and abandoned. Nell is led to the spiral staircase, where she puts a noose around her neck while imagining it to be her mother's locket. She is then pushed by her mother's ghost, breaking her neck. As Nell dies, she travels through the past, revealing that she herself was the Bent-Neck Lady and has been haunting her younger self all along.
6	"Two Storms"	Mike Flanagan	Mike Flanagan & Jeff Howard	October 12, 2018
The episode alternates between two storms: one the family experienced in the past at Hill House, the other in the present, the night before Nell's funeral, with the Crain family meeting at the funeral parlor to view her body, finally together in the same room after years. At Hill House, Nell goes missing. Olivia sees spirits and enters a fugue state, acting strangely. Nell reappears, shaken, and states that she had been right there in front of the family the whole time, yelling, but they could not see or hear her. In the present, as the Crains argue, odd things happen: Steven sees the ghost of his mother, the power goes out, and someone places buttons on Nell's eyes. Steven demands answers from Hugh about what really happened, leading to confrontations. Shirley catches Theo and Kevin together in a storage room. Nell's coffin falls over by itself, startling the Crains into shock. Nell's spirit, as the Bent-Neck Lady, is present in the room, but no one sees her – except for Hugh for a short time.
7	"Eulogy"	Mike Flanagan	Charise Castro Smith	October 12, 2018
It is revealed that Hugh often talks to Olivia like she is still there. He is able to make amends with Theo, who says she should have reached out to him. During the funeral, he tries to reconnect with the rest of his children. In the past, Hugh assesses the house for storm damage. Mr. Dudley assists, revealing some history of the house's previous occupants. Mr. Dudley suggests that the erratic Olivia needs to spend time away from the house, revealing why he and Mrs. Dudley never come to the house at night. Olivia's behavior becomes more disturbing. After Hugh wakes to find a disoriented Olivia holding a screwdriver to his neck, they agree she needs to leave Hill House for a few days. While carrying out renovation works in the basement where Luke fell, Hugh inadvertently uncovers the body of William Hill, the original owner, who had bricked himself up inside the house's walls. After Olivia's death, when being questioned by the police, Hugh states the Red Room remained locked, but during the events of the last night at the house, Hugh finds the door to the Red Room unlocked. After the funeral, Olivia's ghost attacks Luke, then Hugh and Theo. Luke goes missing after the funeral, stealing Shirley's wallet and Theo's car.
8	"Witness Marks"	Mike Flanagan	Jeff Howard & Rebecca Klingel	October 12, 2018
Steven and Hugh drive around to find Luke. Steven believes the family's issues are due to mental illness and explains he underwent a vasectomy to avoid passing his family's "sickness" on. At the funeral parlor, Shirley and Theo have an argument over Theo and Kevin in the storage room. The family discovers that Luke is on his way to Hill House. Hugh reveals to Steven that Steven has been seeing ghosts all along without realizing they were ghosts, assuring him that none of them are mentally ill. He reveals that the tree house which Steven and Luke frequented at Hill House was not actually there, describing the Crains as "like an unfinished meal" to the house. Shirley and Theo also begin driving to Hill House to save Luke. As they begin to argue, Nell's ghost suddenly appears, scaring them. Theo breaks down, explaining that Shirley misunderstood her and Kevin; nothing happened beyond her trying to get her ability to "feel" back. Luke tries to burn down Hill House, only to be attacked by the ghost of Poppy Hill, William Hill's insane wife.
9	"Screaming Meemies"	Mike Flanagan	Meredith Averill	October 12, 2018
In the past, Olivia begins having disturbing paranormal experiences in the house. She sees a vision of the corpses of adult Nell and Luke, and encounters the ghost of Poppy Hill, who tells her the world outside will devour her children and she needs to keep them safe. Disoriented and scared, Olivia and Hugh decide she should take a break and travel to her sister Janet's house. However, Olivia, now unstable and influenced by the house, never goes and the family's last night at the mansion starts to unfold. A delusional Olivia takes Nell, Luke, and Abigail, who was sleeping over, for a tea party in the Red Room, which is now open. Hugh realizes Olivia has poisoned the tea with rat poison to kill the kids, believing this is the only way to keep them safe from the world. He saves Luke and Nell but is too late to save Abigail. Terrified, he hurriedly gets the kids out of the house while Olivia, wanting to "wake up" from her horrible "dream", jumps off the top of the spiral staircase.
10	"Silence Lay Steadily"	Mike Flanagan	Mike Flanagan	October 12, 2018
Steven and Hugh find Luke unconscious in the Red Room. Steven, Theo, and Shirley all become locked inside with Luke, and all experience revelatory nightmares about their lives as the house tries to kill them; all the siblings are saved by Nell's ghost. They awaken to find Luke dying. Nell's ghost explains that the Red Room is the "stomach" of the house and can disguise itself as different rooms to each person to calm them while it "digests" them. It disguised itself as the tree house for Luke, the gaming room for Steven, and so on. The siblings apologize for not saving Nell and she assures them that they all loved each other. Olivia's ghost keeps the siblings trapped, not wanting them to leave. Hugh convinces her to open the door, telling her he will make her a promise. She frees them, and Shirley and Theo drive Luke to the hospital. Hugh and Steven stay behind and the aftermath of Olivia's death is revealed, including the fact that the Dudleys were Abigail's parents. Hugh says goodbye to Steven, entering the Red Room to stay forever with Olivia and Nell (his promise). Steven finally acknowledges the presence of the house's ghosts. Two years later, the siblings, their bonds reconciled, celebrate Luke's sobriety together with their partners. An elderly Horace brings Clara to die in the house, her spirit joining Abigail.

== Production ==
=== Development ===
On April 10, 2017, Netflix announced that it had ordered a 10-episode adaptation of the classic horror novel The Haunting of Hill House, with Mike Flanagan and Trevor Macy as executive producers, and Amblin Television and Paramount Television as co-production companies. It is the first scripted series to be made for Netflix by Amblin.

Production on the series began in October 2017 in Atlanta, Georgia, with location filming in the city and its environs. Bisham Manor, former name of the property located in LaGrange, served as the exterior of "Hill House". The house's interior settings were filmed at EUE/Screen Gem Studios in Atlanta.

=== Music ===
The soundtrack was composed by The Newton Brothers. On October 31, 2018, Waxwork Records released the soundtrack on a double LP.

==== Track listing ====
The Haunting of Hill House (Music from the Netflix Horror Series)
No.	Title	Length
1.	"The Haunting of Hill House (Main Titles)"	1:06
2.	"Come Home"	5:11
3.	"Larks and Katydids"	4:33
4.	"Darkness and Chaos"	1:45
5.	"That Night"	1:47
6.	"Take Her Down"	1:26
7.	"Whatever Walked There, Walked Alone"	1:04
8.	"Hill House"	1:10
9.	"Go Tomorrow"	2:37
10.	"Science vs. Religion"	0:54
11.	"What Did You Really See"	1:19
12.	"The Red Room"	1:11
13.	"Missing Things"	1:06
14.	"I Believe You"	1:42
15.	"12:00 A.M."	1:45
16.	"In the Shadow of Ghosts"	1:34
17.	"I Want to Wake up So Badly"	3:16
18.	"Luke"	1:28
19.	"Approaching the House"	2:39
20.	"Haunted Past"	1:51
21.	"You Remember"	1:57
22.	"Feel Nothing"	2:39
23.	"Beginning of the End Movement I"	3:28
24.	"Beginning of the End Movement II (Tea Party)"	2:44
25.	"Beginning of the End Movement III"	2:29
26.	"Beginning of the End Movement IV"	3:27
27.	"The End"	2:48
Total length:		58:56

== Reception ==
=== Critical reception ===
On Rotten Tomatoes, The Haunting of Hill House has a 93% rating based on 103 reviews, with an average rating of 8.4/10. The website's critical consensus reads, "The Haunting of Hill House is an effective ghost story whose steadily mounting anticipation is just as satisfying as its chilling payoff." On Metacritic, it has a weighted average score of 79 out of 100 based on 18 critics, indicating "generally favorable reviews".

Corrine Corrodus of The Telegraph graded the series with a 5/5 rating, calling it "the most complex and complete horror series of its time." Brian Tallerico of RogerEbert.com gave unanimous praise to the Netflix adaptation, describing it as "essential viewing", and stated that "[the show] contains some of the most unforgettable horror imagery in film or television in years." David Griffin of IGN gave the series a rating of 9.5 out of 10, calling it "a superb and terrifying family drama", and Paul Tassi of Forbes described it as "absolutely fantastic" and stated that "it may actually be Netflix's best original show ever."

Horror author Stephen King, who holds considerable admiration for Jackson's novel, tweeted about the series, "I don't usually care for this kind of revisionism, but this is great. Close to a work of genius, really. I think Shirley Jackson would approve, but who knows for sure." (Note: Mike Flanagan also wrote and directed two films adapted from novels by King, 2017's Gerald's Game, also for Netflix, and 2019's Doctor Sleep.)

In January 2020, filmmaker Quentin Tarantino said, "My favorite Netflix series, with no competition, is The Haunting of Hill House."

=== Awards and nominations ===
Year	Award	Category	Nominee(s)	Result	Ref.
2019	Writers Guild of America Awards	New Series	Meredith Averill, Charise Castro Smith, Mike Flanagan, Jeff Howard, Rebecca Leigh Klingel, Scott Kosar, Liz Phang	Nominated	
2019	Art Directors Guild Awards	One-Hour Period or Fantasy Single-Camera Television Series	Patricio M. Farrell	Nominated	
2019	Fangoria Chainsaw Awards	Best Series	Mike Flanagan	Won	
2019	Bram Stoker Award	Superior Achievement in a Screenplay	Meredith Averill for "The Bent-Neck Lady"	Won	
2019	Saturn Awards	Best Streaming Horror & Thriller Series	The Haunting of Hill House	Nominated	
2019	Saturn Awards	Best Actor in a Streaming Presentation	Henry Thomas	Won	
2019	Saturn Awards	Best Actress in a Streaming Presentation	Carla Gugino	Nominated	
2019	Saturn Awards	Best Supporting Actor in a Streaming Presentation	Michiel Huisman	Nominated	
2019	Saturn Awards	Best Supporting Actor in a Streaming Presentation	Timothy Hutton	Nominated	
2019	Saturn Awards	Best Supporting Actress in a Streaming Presentation	Victoria Pedretti	Nominated	

== Home media ==
In August 2019, it was announced that The Haunting of Hill House would be released on Blu-ray and DVD from Paramount Home Entertainment on October 15, 2019. The release includes extended director's cuts of three episodes ("Steven Sees a Ghost", "The Bent-Neck Lady" and "Silence Lay Steadily"), all of which also have audio commentaries from Flanagan, and an additional audio commentary for "Two Storms".

== Follow-up series ==
In October 2018, Flanagan said that a possible second season would not continue the story of the Crain family, specifying, "it's done." On February 21, 2019, Netflix renewed the series for a second season as an anthology series, titled The Haunting of Bly Manor, and based on The Turn of the Screw by Henry James. It was released on October 9, 2020. The second season features the return of several Hill House actors portraying new characters, including Victoria Pedretti, Oliver Jackson-Cohen, Henry Thomas, Kate Siegel, Katie Parker and Carla Gugino.

== See also ==
- Other adaptations of The Haunting of Hill House
