= The Bent-Neck Lady =

- The Haunting of Hill House episode
- Episode no.: Episode 5
- Directed by: Mike Flanagan
- Written by: Meredith Averill
- Running time: 70 minutes

Guest appearances
- Annabeth Gish as Mrs. Dudley; Anthony Ruivivar as Kevin Harris; Samantha Sloyan as Leigh Crain; Robert Longstreet as Mr. Dudley; Jordane Christie as Arthur; Russ Tamblyn as Dr. Montague; Bruce Greenwood as a ghost (uncredited)

Episode chronology
| ← Previous "The Twin Thing" | Next → "Two Storms" |

"The Bent-Neck Lady" is the fifth episode of the American supernatural horror drama miniseries The Haunting of Hill House. The episode follows Nell, the deceased youngest child of the Crain family. The nonlinear narrative depicts her struggles with an apparition known as the Bent-Neck Lady as a child and adult that ultimately lead to her death. Directed by Mike Flanagan and written by Meredith Averill, the episode was released on Netflix on October 12, 2018.

Flanagan said that Nell's story in "The Bent-Neck Lady" made him cry and that it was the reason he wanted to create The Haunting of Hill House. The episode received positive reviews from critics, who found it moving and scary. They enjoyed the twist ending, in which it is revealed that Nell herself is the Bent-Neck Lady. The episode also won a Bram Stoker Award for Best Screenplay.

== Plot ==
The Crain family is living at Hill House to renovate the mansion in order to sell it. Their youngest child, Nell (Violet McGraw), is tormented by an apparition she calls the Bent-Neck Lady, a ghost with a broken neck. Later, her mother, Olivia (Carla Gugino), furiously accuses her of writing "Nell" on the wall, which she denies. While cleaning the wall, Nell's older sister Theo (Mckenna Grace) pulls back the rest of the wallpaper to reveal the full text "Come Home, Nell".

As an adult, Nell (Victoria Pedretti) sees a technologist, Arthur (Jordane Christie), for sleep paralysis. The two fall in love and marry, with Nell no longer being haunted by the Bent-Neck Lady. During their first year of marriage, Nell experiences sleep paralysis and sees the Lady while Arthur dies. Nell discusses his death with a therapist named Dr. Montague (Russ Tamblyn), blaming it on Hill House, but Montague tells her that he died of a brain aneurysm. Later, before entering rehabilitation for his heroin addiction, Luke (Oliver Jackson-Cohen), Nell's twin, convinces her to buy him a last dose of heroin to aid his recovery. As he injects it, she sees the Bent-Neck Lady.

Months later, Nell stops using her sleep paralysis medication, believing that it makes her see the Lady. She asks Theo (Kate Siegel) to try to obtain information about Arthur's death using extrasensory perception and lashes out at her when she refuses. Nell then goes to a book talk for an autobiographical novel about the Crain family's experiences at Hill House written by her brother Steven (Michiel Huisman). There, she angrily confronts him for not believing the events he wrote about.

Nell travels to Hill House after Montague convinces her that it is "just a carcass". Before she arrives, she sees Luke's corpse on a motel ceiling and phones Steven and Shirley (Elizabeth Reaser), but both decline her calls. When she arrives at Hill House, she sees it boarded-up and derelict. She calls her father, Hugh (Timothy Hutton), and the house's interior suddenly lights up. Inside, Nell sees it fully renovated, with her family and Arthur present, instead of its desolate, abandoned reality. Nell is led to the spiral staircase, where she puts a noose around her neck while imagining it to be Olivia's locket. She is then pushed by Olivia's ghost, breaking her neck. As Nell dies, she travels through the past, revealing that she herself was the Bent-Neck Lady and has been haunting her younger self.

== Production ==
The Haunting of Hill House is a supernatural horror drama miniseries loosely based on Shirley Jackson's 1959 novel of the same name. The series employs a nonlinear narrative, with frequent flashbacks. The first five episodes are told from the perspectives of each Crain sibling, with "The Bent-Neck Lady" focusing on Nell's backstory; the idea was inspired by the science fiction television series Lost (2004–2010). Series creator Mike Flanagan reimagined Jackson's novel as a family horror series due to his lifelong interest in the genre. Nell's character was shaped by Jackson's line "I am like a small creature swallowed whole by a monster, and the monster feels my tiny movements inside."

The episode was directed by Flanagan and written by Meredith Averill. Flanagan began crying when he conceived Nell's character arc in "The Bent-Neck Lady", adding that it was the reason he wanted to create The Haunting of Hill House. He said that her arc was the "spine" of the show since the beginning of development and that knowing the direction of the Bent-Neck Lady's story was crucial. He attempted to make Nell's interactions with the Bent-Neck Lady in prior episodes "an extension" of "The Bent-Neck Lady". The episode's twist ending—where it is revealed that Nell herself is the Bent-Neck Lady—was conceived as the series' midpoint, since Flanagan thought it would become too obvious if it was withheld for longer. During initial pitches, studios and Netflix found the twist to be one of the show's most intriguing elements.

The Canadian actor Bruce Greenwood makes an appearance as a ghost in the background of the Crain parents' bedroom. Flanagan ensured that he was out-of-focus so that he would seem as though he were "just part of the wall". Greenwood's appearance was an easter egg to Flanagan's film Gerald's Game (2017), which stars Gugino, Greenwood, and Thomas. Tamblyn, who portrayed Luke Sanderson in the 1963 film adaptation of Jackson's novel, makes a cameo appearance as Dr. Montague.

== Release ==
"The Bent-Neck Lady" was released alongside the entirety of The Haunting of Hill House on October 12, 2018. It is the fifth episode and has a length of approximately 70 minutes. An extended director's cut with commentary by Flanagan was released on Blu-ray and DVD in October 2019.

== Reception ==
"The Bent-Neck Lady" received positive reviews and has been considered a standout episode by critics and viewers. Several journalists remarked on its depth. Brian Tallerico of RogerEbert.com favorably compared it to the horror author Stephen King's best work and called it "one of the most moving things I've seen all year" due to its "human" narrative. Similarly, Slate's Sam Adams guaranteed that the episode would "crush you emotionally", and Digital Spy's Josh Winning found its emotion "devastating". According to Daniel D'Addario of Variety, it explores themes of family and shared suffering realistically and meaningfully. The New Yorker's Emily Nussbaum, who deemed the majority of The Haunting of Hill House soulless, lauded "The Bent-Neck Lady" as a "beautifully structured fairy tale with a sad ending" and "truly skillful". Additionally, Ruth Franklin from Vulture said Christie was "very smooth", and Emily L. Stephens from The A.V. Club approvingly highlighted Pedretti's silent scenes.

Other critics found the episode scary. Yahoo! Entertainment dubbed it "an effective horror-movie event", while Den of Geek praised the performances as "harrowing" and noted the use of real-life medical problems for horror. Katie Rife from The A.V. Club wrote that the episode prompted her to go to bed with the lights turned on "for the first time in years", and Katie Heaney and Allison P. Davis of The Cut said the Bent-Neck Lady was so scary that she caused them nightmares. Vulture's Lindsey Romain described "The Bent-Neck Lady" as "an inevitable hour of impending doom" that combines the supernatural with great psychological tension. Franklin deemed it the show's most frightening episode thus far and argued that it was equally sad as well.

Critics singled out the twist ending, with the /Film writer Nick Staniforth describing it as a "wild time loop ... [that] worked brilliantly". Slant Magazine's Ed Gonzalez and Franklin found the ending "wrenching" and "inspiring", while VanArendonk rated its scariness "12/10". Reviewers also praised the technical aspects; Adams found the visuals enchanting, and D'Addario and Winning dubbed it a "bravura".

The episode has been included in best-of lists by journalists. Variety and Salon picked it as one of 2018's top television episodes, while TVLine deemed it the best drama episode of the year. IGN and BuzzFeed News listed the ending as one of 2018's best twists and scenes, respectively. Averill also won the 2018 Bram Stoker Award for Best Screenplay.
