= List of Australian films of 2022 =

The following is a list of Australian films that have been released in 2022.

== Films ==
Opening		Title	Director	Cast	Genre	Ref
J A N U A R Y	22	You Won't Be Alone	Goran Stolevski	Noomi Rapace, Anamaria Marinca, Alice Englert	Horror	
J A N U A R Y	26	Gold	Anthony Hayes	Zac Efron, Susie Porter	Survival thriller	
M A Y	22	How to Please a Woman	Renée Webster	Sally Phillips, Caroline Brazier, Erik Thomson	Comedy	
J U N E	8	We Are Still Here	Beck Cole, Dena Curtis, Tracey Rigney, Danielle MacLean, Tim Worrall, Renae Maihi, Miki Magasiva, Mario Gaoa, Richard Curtis and Chantelle Burgoyne		Anthology	
J U N E	13	Lonesome	Craig Boreham	Josh Lavery, Daniel Gabriel, Ian Roberts	Drama	
J U L Y	29	The Reef: Stalked	Andrew Traucki	Teressa Liane, Ann Truong, Saskia Archer, Kate Lister, Tim Ross	Horror	
A U G U S T	4	Of an Age	Goran Stolevski		Drama	
A U G U S T	11	6 Festivals	Macario de Souza	Rory Potter, Yasmin Honeychurch, Rasmus King, Guyala Bayles, Kyuss King, Briony Williams	Drama	
A U G U S T	13	Sweet As	Jub Clerc	Shantae Barnes-Cowan, Mark Coles Smith, Tasma Walton	Drama	
S E P T E M B E R	10	Blueback	Robert Connolly	Mia Wasikowska, Radha Mitchell, Erik Thomson, Eddie Baroo, Eric Bana	Drama	
O C T O B E R	19	Dipped in Black (Marungka tjalatjunu)	Matthew Thorne, Derik Lynch	Derik Lynch	Short documentary	
O C T O B E R	27	Monolith	Matt Vesely	Lily Sullivan	Sci-fi thriller	
O C T O B E R	30	Talk to Me	Danny and Michael Philippou	Sophie Wilde, Alexandra Jensen, Joe Bird, Otis Dhanji, Miranda Otto, Zoe Terakes, Chris Alosio, Marcus Johnson, Alexandria Steffensen	Horror	
N O V E M B E R	3	Sissy	Hannah Barlow, Kane Senes	Aisha Dee, Hannah Barlow, Emily De Margheriti, Daniel Monks, Yerin Ha, Lucy Barrett	Horror thriller	

== See also ==
- 2022 in Australia
- 2022 in Australian television
- List of Australian films of 2023
