= David Frigerio =

American screenwriter

- Education: Lee Strasberg Theater Institute
- Occupations: Screenwriter; Producer
- Years active: 1998–present
- Notable work: The Signal; Land of Bad

David Frigerio is an American screenwriter and producer. He is known for his film Land of Bad, directed by William Eubank and starring Liam Hemsworth, Russell Crowe, and Luke Hemsworth, which was released theatrically in the United States on February 16, 2024.

== Background ==
Frigerio began his writing career as a playwright in his hometown New York City, writing and producing his first play, an off-Broadway production, at age 21. He is a lover of science fiction and used to attend MUFON conferences, which inspired his work on The Signal. He is strongly influenced by the work of Michio Kaku, Ray Kurzweil, and Neil deGrasse Tyson.

== Filmography ==
Year	Title	Writer	Producer	Ref.
2010	Wreckage	Yes	Yes	
2014	The Signal	Yes	No	
2019	Crypto	Yes	Yes	
2023	Muzzle	No	Yes	
2023	Bad Hombres	No	Yes	
2024	Land of Bad	Yes	Yes	
2025	Broke	No	Yes	
2026	Beast	Yes	Yes	
