= Ghost Soldier (film) =

2026 action film directed by Will Eubank

- Theatrical release poster
- Directed by: William Eubank
- Written by: Chris Papasadero
- Produced by: David Zelon; William Sherak
- Starring: Jim Caviezel; Olivia Thirlby; Garret Dillahunt; Beau Knapp; Shea Whigham
- Cinematography: Agustin Claramunt
- Edited by: Todd E. Miller; Rebecca Weigold
- Music by: Brandon Roberts
- Production companies: Columbia Pictures; Mandalay Pictures; Project X Entertainment; Alien Films Entertainment
- Distributed by: Sony Pictures Releasing
- Release dates: November 4, 2026 (France); November 11, 2026 (United States)
- Running time: 90 minutes
- Country: United States
- Language: English
- Budget: $18 million
- Box office: $12.6 million

Ghost Soldier is a 2026 American action film directed by William Eubank and written by Chris Papasadero. It stars Jim Caviezel, Olivia Thirlby, Beau Knapp, Garret Dillahunt, and Shea Whigham. A retired soldier (Caviezel) helps a family save their land from corrupted greedy business people.

Ghost Soldier was first released in France on November 4, 2026, and in the United States by Sony Pictures Releasing through Columbia Pictures on November 11, 2026. It received mixed reviews from critics.

== Plot ==
Henry "Fitz" Fitzgerald is a former United States Army Special Forces (Green Beret) soldier who lives off the grid in Wyoming designing weapons for a U.S. military research projects agency.

Meanwhile, a ruthless Middle Eastern corporation, Brownstone, uses aggressive machinations to force people out of their homes and steal their lands for the company. Two hunters attempt to kill Jack Hernandez, a young boy who is the son of Fitz's deceased military friend, but one is shot in the shoulder by Fitz and both are forced to back away.

Fitz and Jack go hunting but Fitz refrains from killing a deer after seeing it has a family. Soon after Fitz tells Jack to go home, he sees that Headwaters, his base, is under threat from Brownstone mercenaries, lead by Graves and his henchman, McNeil. The mercenaries beat and stab Fitz with his own knife and throw him in the river, but he manages to survive, make it back to Headwaters and treat his wounds. Fitz then assaults and tortures the same mercenary who stabbed him into telling him what Graves is up to next and then shoots him dead as retaliation for stabbing him.

Graves, McNeil and the Brownstone mercenaries attack the Hernandez family home and burn it to the ground, and Jack's grandfather, Javier, is shot. Fitz sneaks onto the farm land and kills five of the mercenaries, rescuing Jack, Javier and Jack’s mother, Sophia, who kills the last mercenary as Graves and McNeil escape. Heidi, a policewoman, investigates Brownstone's CEO, Ty Bell, despite being under pressure from the town’s corrupt mayor, Boyd, who is being bribed by Brownstone.

After Javier is taken to the hospital, Fitz tracks down Brownstone executives, Nina Whitney and Michael Taran, where he uses psychological torture on Whitney to find out what Brownstone is plotting, and shoots Taran dead outside his house. Graves and McNeil locate the hospital where the Hernandez family is at and attempt to kidnap Jack, but Fitz, with an invisibility cloak, rescues him and has the Hernandez family sent to a safer location. A Bosnian mercenary named Mirko and his men are tasked with eliminating Fitz, and brutally murder his gun supplier, a fellow war veteran named Garry.

Fitz then calls Graves and Mirko, and warns them that he is not a threat, but a guarantee, before targeting Brownstone’s new AI data centre. He launches shockwaves in order to prevent water from being used for it, while Mirko orders his men to kill Fitz, who uses his gadgets and weapons like his invisibility cloak, explosive bullets, etc., to kill all of Mirko's men, while Heidi fights McNeil, who is accidentally shot and killed by Graves.

Fitz eventually engages Mirko in hand to hand combat and kills him by blasting a hole through his chest with one of his gadgets. Graves attempts to shoot Fitz, but is shot by Heidi, wounding him. The two escape and Fitz's explosive bullets go off, destroying the AI data centre. Boyd and Bell are then both arrested for their crimes.

Fitz goes horse riding with Jack again and tells him that he will be out of the country for a few days. He then tracks down the Middle Eastern investor and mastermind behind Brownstone and shoots him in the head with a sniper rifle, killing him.

== Cast ==
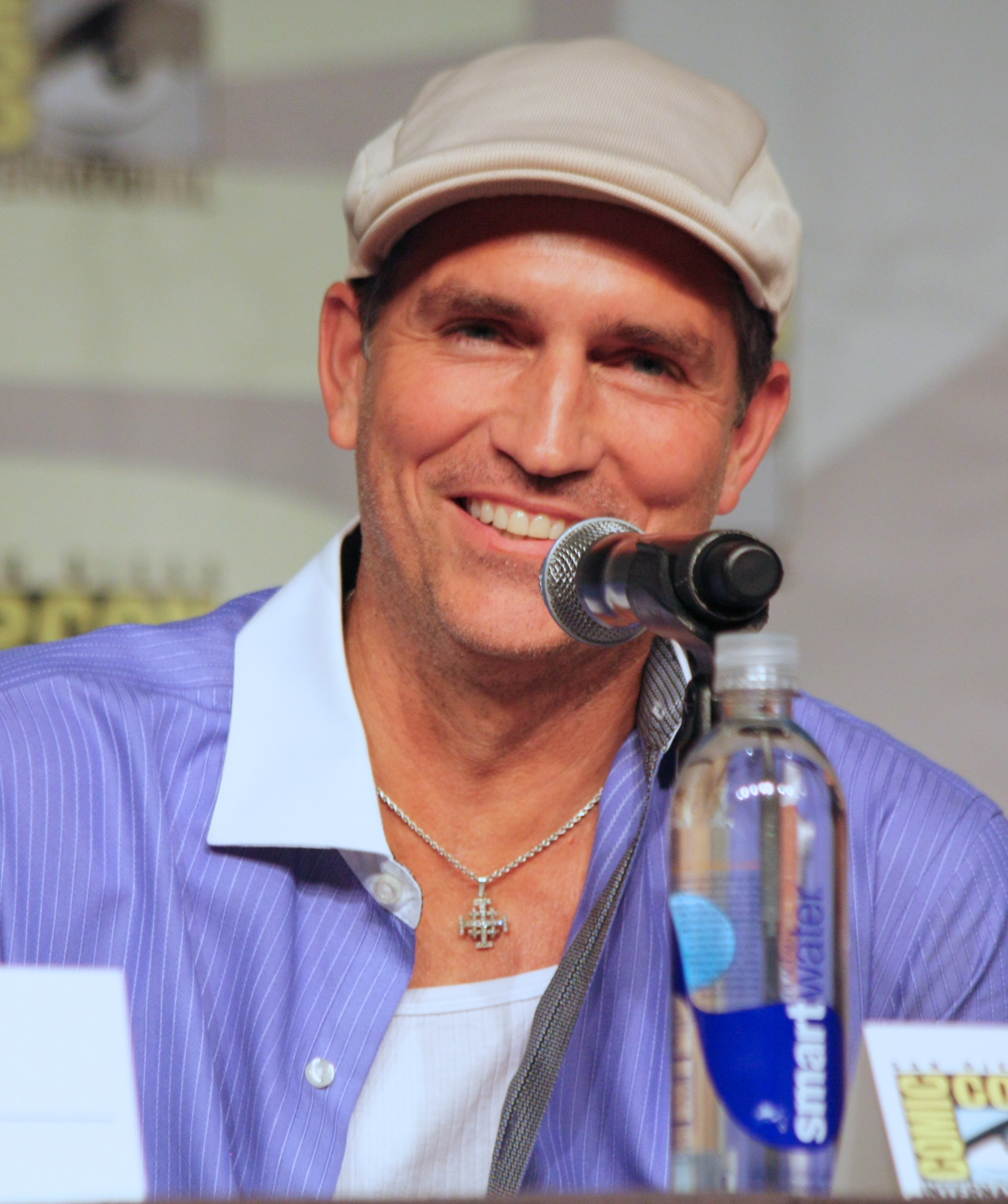
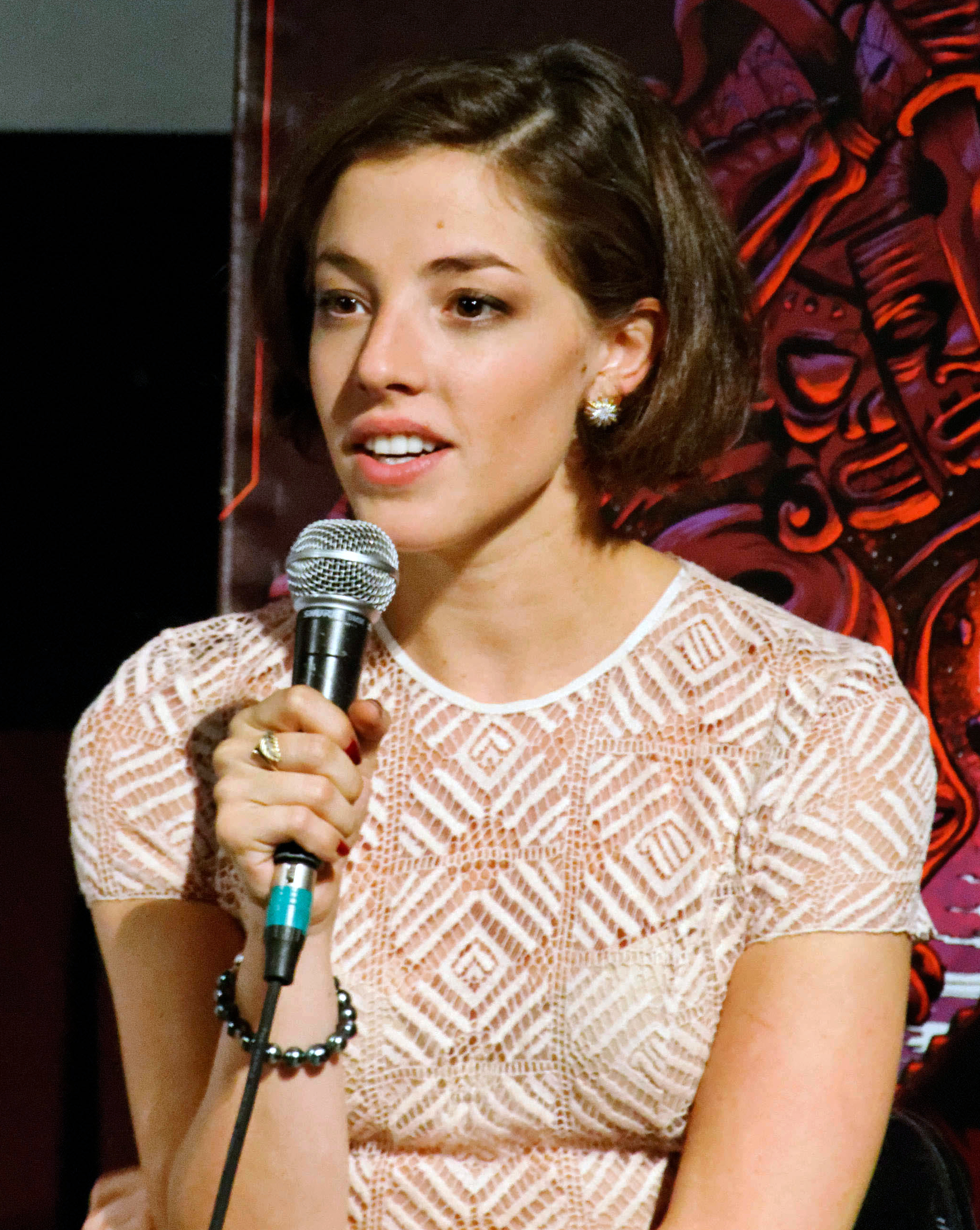
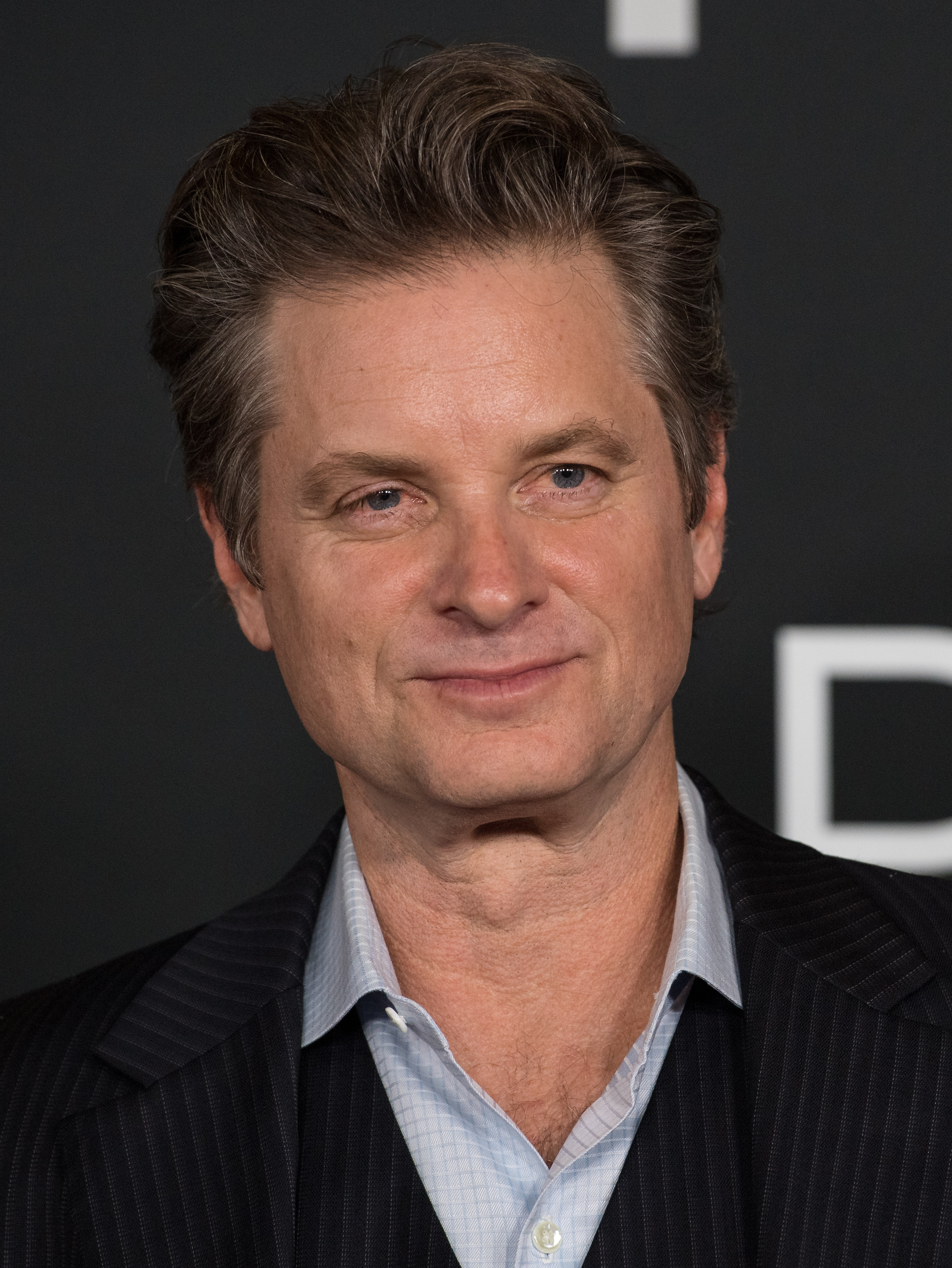
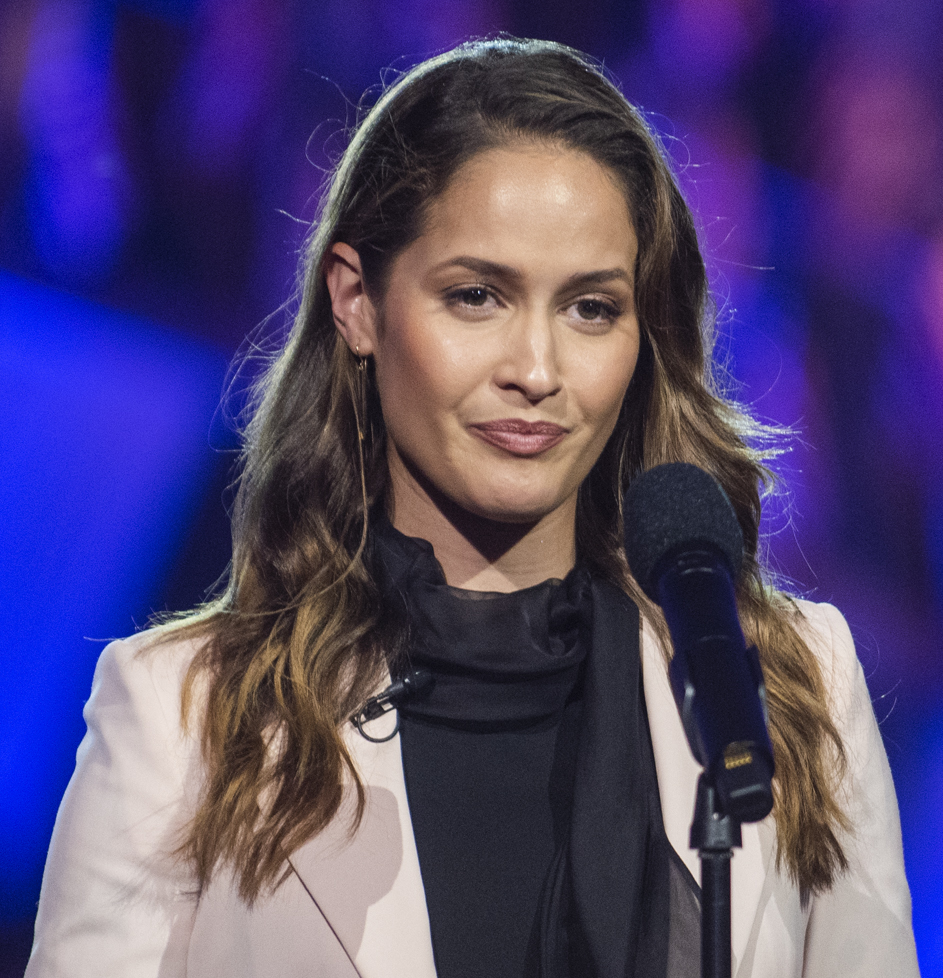
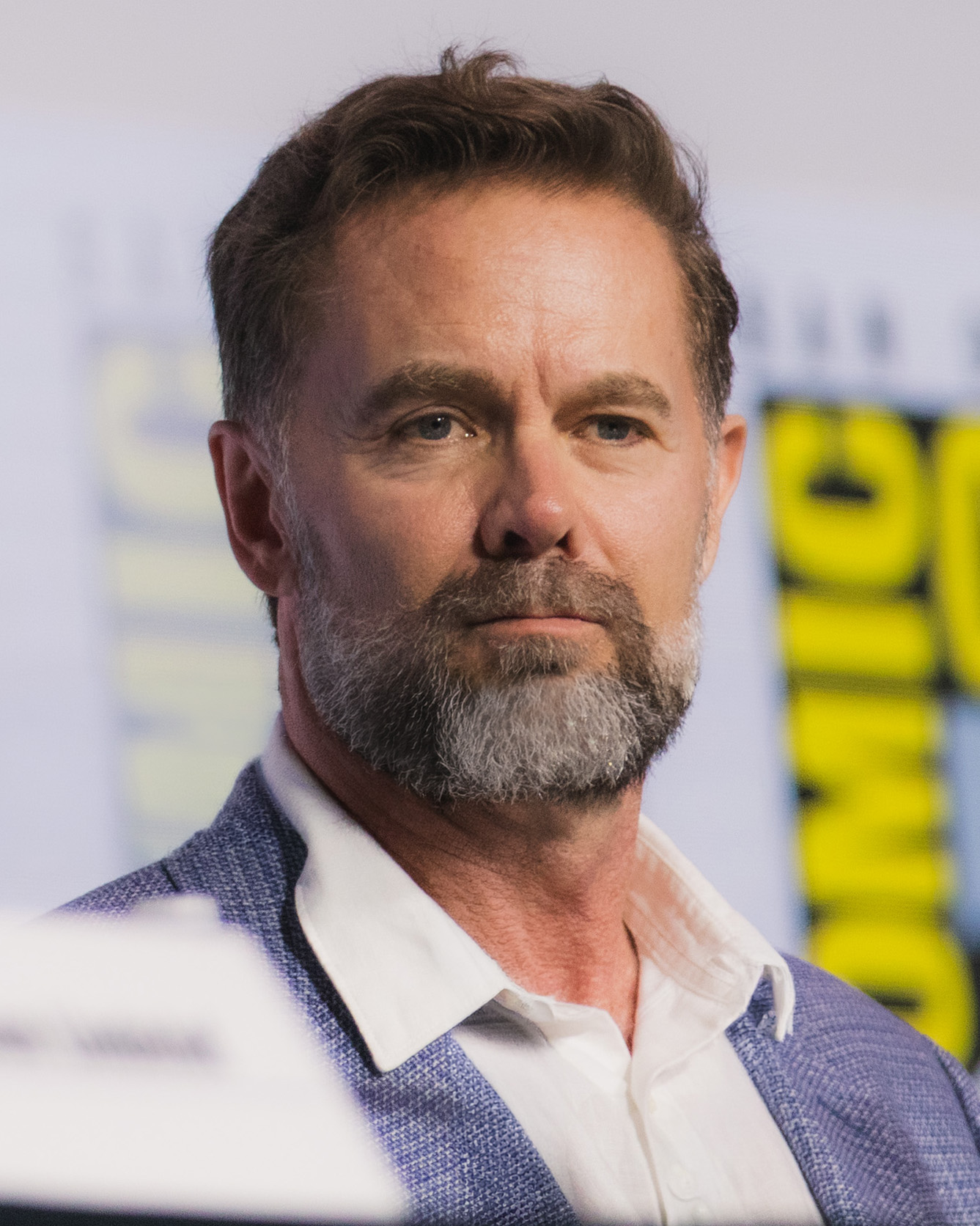
(Left to right, top-bottom): Jim Caviezel, Olivia Thirlby, Shea Whigham, Jaina Lee Ortiz, and Garret Dillahunt
- Jim Caviezel as Henry "Fitz" Fitzgerald
- Olivia Thirlby as Heidi
- Garret Dillahunt as Graves
- Shea Whigham as Scott Peary
- Beau Knapp as Mirko
- Michael Ironside as Garry
- Olivia Chenery as Sarah Taran
- Tetiana Dar as Cava Sokolov
- Jaina Lee Ortiz as Sophia Hernandez
- Cameron Gayden as Jack Hernandez
- Carlos Gómez as Javier Hernandez

== Production ==
In October 2025, it was announced that an action film directed by William Eubank was in development under the title Archangel, with screenwriters Chris Papasadero and Randall Wallace attached and Jim Caviezel, Olivia Thirlby, Garret Dillahunt, and Shea Whigham joining the cast. The cast also includes Beau Knapp and Jaina Lee Ortiz.

Filming took place in Romania, beginning on August 18, 2025. The film's screenplay, originally titled Headwaters, was credited to Chris Papasadero. The film's score was composed by Brandon Roberts. The film was produced by Mandalay Pictures, Project X Entertainment, and Alien Films Entertainment.

== Release ==
Ghost Soldier was first released in France on November 4, 2026, and in the United States through Columbia Pictures by Sony Pictures Releasing on November 11, 2026. It was initially scheduled for November 6 but pushed back to coincide with Veterans Day in order to avoid competition with the Warner Bros. animated film The Cat in the Hat. The film began using that title in May when audiences were invited to test screenings. For its release in the United States, the film secured a PG-13 rating from the Motion Picture Association, with rating content descriptors listed as "strong violence, some bloody images, and language".

== Reception ==
=== Box office ===
The film made $3.1 million over its first two days of release.

=== Critical response ===
On the review aggregator website Rotten Tomatoes, 38% of 21 critics' reviews are positive, with an average rating of 4.2/10. Metacritic, which uses a weighted average, assigns the film a score of 41 out of 100, based on six critics, indicating "mixed or average" reviews.
