= Land of Bad =

2024 action film by William Eubank

- Theatrical release poster
- Directed by: William Eubank
- Written by: David Frigerio; William Eubank
- Produced by: David Frigerio; William Eubank; Michael Jefferson; Adam Beasley; Nathan Klingher; Ryan Winterstern; Arianne Fraser; Petr Jákl; Mark Fasano
- Starring: Liam Hemsworth; Russell Crowe; Luke Hemsworth; Ricky Whittle; Milo Ventimiglia
- Cinematography: Agustin Claramunt
- Edited by: Todd E. Miller
- Music by: Brandon Roberts
- Production companies: R.U. Robot Studios; Highland Film Group; Volition Media Partners
- Distributed by: The Avenue; Variance Films
- Release dates: February 9, 2024 (Edwards Air Force Base); February 16, 2024 (United States)
- Running time: 114 minutes
- Country: United States
- Language: English
- Budget: $20 million
- Box office: $7 million

Land of Bad is a 2024 American action thriller film directed by William Eubank, who co-wrote the script with David Frigerio. The film stars Liam Hemsworth, Russell Crowe, Luke Hemsworth, Ricky Whittle, and Milo Ventimiglia, and follows a US Army Delta Force team on a rescue operation that comes under attack from terrorists. Land of Bad was released theatrically on February 16, 2024. It grossed $7 million worldwide.

== Plot ==
Captain Eddie "Reaper" Grimm, a US Air Force drone pilot in the 15th Attack Squadron, supported by Staff Sergeant Nia Branson, provides air support from a Reaper to a US Army Delta Force team sent to rescue a CIA spy in the southern Philippines. After a firefight breaks out against the Abu Sayyaf, Sergeant JJ Kinney – a young Air Force TACP (callsign "Playboy") attached to the Delta Force team as its JTAC – is seemingly the only survivor and is directed to an extraction point, relying only on the Reaper's remote air support.

Once Kinney arrives, he is intercepted by the Abu Sayyaf forces, depleting the ammunition of Grimm's drone (consisting of AGM-114 Hellfire and BLU-118 munitions) and forcing the endangered extraction helicopter to leave. Trying to reach another extraction point, Kinney falls down a hill and loses his rifle, runs out of ammunition for his pistol, and then gets captured. One of his squad mates, Master Sergeant John "Sugar" Sweet, turns out to be alive and rescues Kinney, while telling him Sergeant Bishop was taken prisoner in Abu Sayyaf's base in a series of caves, at their initial mission location. Using Sweet's radio, Kinney contacts Grimm, who schedules three bombings to hit the base, each 15 minutes apart, before Grimm and Branson are forced by their superiors to take a leave for having exceeded their duty day. Kinney and Sweet raid one of Sayyaf's facilities before being captured and taken to their prison.

Sweet is executed right as the first superficial bombing hits, and Kinney is taken to be tortured, where the rebel leader does not believe his warning about the upcoming bombings till it was too late. After the explosion, Kinney survives due to having been dunked in a water tub, while his captors are caught in the flames. Kinney grabs a machete and kills the surviving leader, taking his satellite phone and calling Nellis Air Force Base for Grimm to call off the third bombing, before the battery runs out.

The base crew, distracted by a March Madness game, dismisses Kinney's call and redirects him to Grimm's private phone. Grimm does not answer, being in a call with his very pregnant wife while grocery shopping, so Kinney leaves a voice mail, and leaves seeking the other prisoners. Returning to Bishop and searching for a way out, they also find the CIA operative, whom Grimm and Branson had been lied to that he was found elsewhere by another agency's operation.

At the grocery store checkout, Grimm hears Kinney's voicemail and immediately leaves, trying to call Nellis while driving to the base. As no one answers, Grimm is forced to rush to the control room and order the B-1 Lancer pilot to abort the bombing, right as it flies in front of Kinney, Bishop, and the CIA agent reaching the cave's entrance. As the soldiers in the Philippines are finally extracted, Grimm complains to the rest of the base crew and his superiors that three men nearly died because they were too distracted to hear their calls, despite being repeatedly asked to pay attention to the phone because of his pregnant wife, and he smashes the break room's main television in anger. Afterwards he convenes with Branson in a hangar, where she asks him to walk her down the aisle in her wedding, and he agrees and leads her in a dance.

== Cast ==
- Liam Hemsworth as AF Sgt. JJ Kinney
- Russell Crowe as AF Capt. Eddie Grimm 'Reaper'
- Luke Hemsworth as Sgt. Abell
- Ricky Whittle as Sgt. Bishop
- Milo Ventimiglia as Master Sgt. John 'Sugar' Sweet
- Chika Ikogwe as Staff Sgt. Nia Branson
- Daniel MacPherson as Colonel Duz Packett
- Robert Rabiah as Saeed Hashimi, leader of the Abu Sayyaf rebels
- Jack Finsterer as Victor Petrov
- Lincoln Lewis as a Young Airman
- Gunner Wright as Hornet #1 and Capt. David Andrews
- George Burgess as Private Cooper
- William Eubank as B1 Pilot

== Production ==
The film, originally titled JTAC, was written by David Frigerio and William Eubank in 2012 and in 2013 at Satellite Coffee coffee shops in Albuquerque during production of their film The Signal. Shortly after writing the script, Eubank and Frigerio shadowed real-life JTACs for two weeks at Fort Irwin National Training Center; their immersion in the world of forward air control was extensive with the two radioing in "nine lines" (close air support briefings) to F-35 pilots overhead during exercises.

The cast project, with Eubank also directing, was first announced at the 2022 Cannes Film Market, with Russell Crowe and Liam Hemsworth as the first cast members attached to the film. In September 2022, additional casting announcements added Milo Ventimiglia, Luke Hemsworth, Ricky Whittle, Daniel MacPherson, Chika Ikogwe, and Robert Rabiah. George Burgess was brought to the cast by Crowe.

In interviews, Eubank explained that the primary inspirations for the film were the 2001 war film Black Hawk Down by director Ridley Scott, the 2010 combat documentary Restrepo by photojournalist Tim Hetherington and writer Sebastian Junger, and the war comedy television series M*A*S*H developed by Larry Gelbart.

Principal photography began in September 2022, running through November 2022 in the Gold Coast, Queensland.

== Release ==
During production, Signature Entertainment purchased the distribution rights for UK and Ireland, France and Scandinavia, with distribution in the United States handled by The Avenue.

The film premiered on February 9, 2024 at Edwards Air Force Base, in an event hosted by the 412th Force Support Squadron which included an audience Q&A session with director William Eubank, writer David Frigerio, producer J.J. Caruth, and actors Ricky Whittle and Milo Ventimiglia. Beginning the following day, complimentary advanced screenings began at US military installations worldwide in the Army & Air Force Exchange Service Reel Time Theaters.

The film was widely released in 1,130 theaters in the United States on February 16, 2024. It was released on demand on March 19, 2024 by Paramount Pictures. It began streaming on Netflix on July 18, 2024.

== Reception ==
On the review aggregator website Rotten Tomatoes, 66% of 64 critics' reviews are positive, with an average rating of 6.2/10. The website's consensus reads: "Thanks to some exciting set pieces and a smartly assembled cast, Land of Bad stands as a solid survival thriller in spite of an overall reliance on genre formula." Metacritic, which uses a weighted average, assigned the film a score of 57 out of 100, based on 10 critics, indicating "mixed or average" reviews.

Simon Abrams of RogerEbert.com gave the film two out of four stars and wrote, "Land of Bad may sell itself as a post-Black Hawk Down rescue mission thriller, but it's too often a baggy dramatized lecture about what's really wrong with the American military and modern warfare."

In a positive review, Nick Schager of The Daily Beast wrote, "The film trades in aggro bluster and bombast that's so pure, undiluted, and unsubtle that it verges on—and sometimes tips over into—comedy. Nonetheless, beneath its puffed chest lurks earnest affection for the men and women who risk their lives for their country and, more importantly, for each other, and that goes some way toward helping it earn its climactic feel-good pathos."

== See also ==
- List of American films of 2024
