= Beast (2026 film) =

2026 film

- Theatrical release poster
- Directed by: Tyler Atkins
- Written by: Russell Crowe; David Frigerio
- Produced by: David Frigerio; John Schwarz; Michael Schwarz; Jamie Arscott; Tim O'Hair
- Starring: Russell Crowe; Daniel MacPherson; Luke Hemsworth
- Cinematography: Thomaz Labanca
- Edited by: Todd E. Miller
- Music by: Brian Cachia
- Production companies: Deepwater Films; Black Pearl Productions; Broken Open Pictures; Storm Alley Entertainment; Armagh Films; One Championship
- Distributed by: Lionsgate and Grindstone Entertainment Group (United States); Rialto Distribution (Australia)
- Release dates: April 10, 2026 (United States); April 23, 2026 (Australia)
- Running time: 113 minutes
- Countries: United States; Australia
- Language: English
- Box office: $1.8 million

Beast is a 2026 sports action drama film set in the world of mixed martial arts, and starring Russell Crowe, Luke Hemsworth and Daniel MacPherson.

== Plot ==
MMA legend Patton James, now a commercial fisherman, is pulled back into the cage when his brother is in danger. Reuniting with his old coach Sammy, he commits to one final fight in ONE Championship against its champion Xavier Grau.

== Cast ==
- Russell Crowe as Sammy
- Daniel MacPherson as Patton James
- Luke Hemsworth as Gabriel Stone
- Mojean Aria as Malon
- Kelly Gale as Luciana
- George Burgess as Neal
- Bren Foster as Xavier Grau
- Saphira Moran as Nadine James
- Amy Shark as Rose
- Herb Dean as himself

== Production ==
The film is produced by Broken Open Pictures and is directed by Tyler Atkins; it was originally announced through the working title The Beast in Me. Russell Crowe co-wrote the script with David Frigerio, who will produce alongside Tim O'Hair and John Schwarz. Crowe also leads the cast with Daniel MacPherson. The cast also includes Luke Hemsworth, Mojean Aria, Kelly Gale, George Burgess, Bren Foster, Saphira Moran, and Australian musician Amy Shark, who makes her feature film debut.

One Championship are collaborating with the film. Principal photography took place in Bangkok at the Impact Arena, where ONE 170: Tawanchai vs. Superbon 2 event on January 24, 2025 provided the setting for a key scene. Additional footage was filmed throughout the week-long event.

== Release ==
In October 2025, Grindstone Entertainment Group acquired domestic distribution rights to the film. Beast was released in the United States on April 10, 2026. It was also released in Australia on April 23, by Rialto Distribution.

== Reception ==
=== Critical response ===
On the review aggregator website Rotten Tomatoes, 81% of 31 critics' reviews are positive, with an average rating of 6.0/10.

== See also ==
- List of American films of 2026
- List of Australian films of 2026
