= Non Compos Mentis (film) =

- Directed by: Paul Schrader
- Written by: Paul Schrader
- Produced by: David Gonzales
- Starring: Liam Hemsworth; Sam Worthington; Cara Delevingne; Dianne Wiest
- Production company: Fortitude Films
- Country: United States
- Language: English

Non Compos Mentis is an upcoming American erotic thriller film written and directed by Paul Schrader. It stars Liam Hemsworth, Sam Worthington, Cara Delevingne, and Dianne Wiest.

== Cast ==
- Liam Hemsworth
- Sam Worthington
- Cara Delevingne
- Dianne Wiest

== Production ==
In May 2024, it was announced that Paul Schrader would be writing and directing his next feature film, an erotic thriller titled Non Compos Mentis. In February 2026, Liam Hemsworth, Caleb Landry Jones, Sarah Pidgeon, and Dianne Wiest joined the cast.

In September 2026, Landry Jones and Pidgeon left the project and were replaced by Sam Worthington and Cara Delevingne.

Principal photography began on October 13, 2026, in New York City, and wrapped on November 2.
