= Kelly Gale =

Swedish-born model (born 1995)

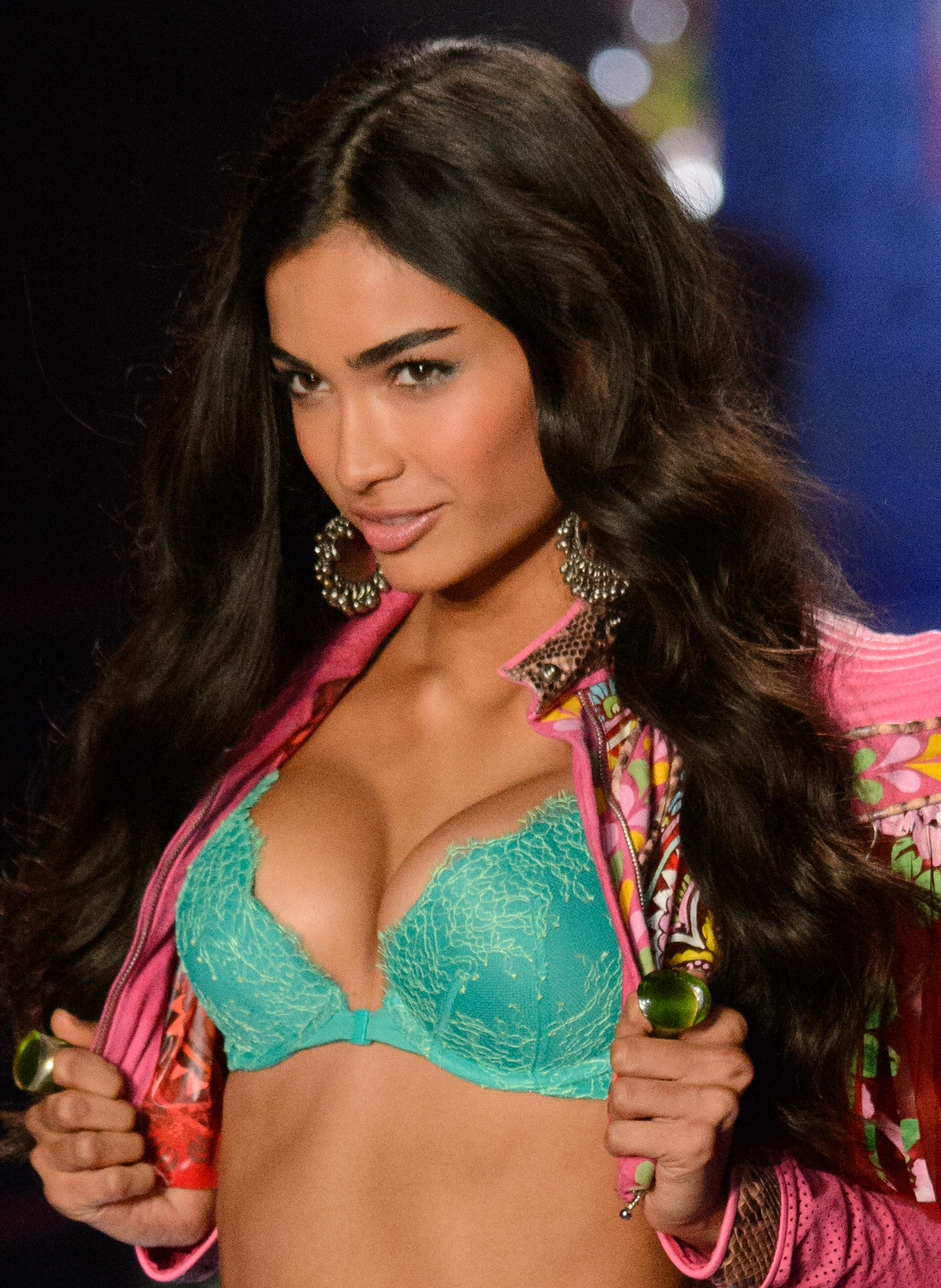
- Gale at Victoria's Secret Fashion Show 2014
- Born: Kelly Olivia Gale; 14 May 1995 (age 31); Gothenburg, Sweden
- Occupations: Model, actress
- Known for: Victoria's Secret Fashion Show
- Spouse: Joel Kinnaman (m. 2024)
- Modelling information
- Height: 5 ft 11 in (1.80 m)
- Hair colour: Brown
- Eye colour: Brown
- Agency: New Scouting & Management (New York); Ford Models (Paris, Los Angeles); Why Not Model Management (Milan); Elite Model Management (London, Barcelona); Unique Models (Copenhagen); Model Management (Hamburg)

Kelly Olivia Gale (born 14 May 1995) is a Swedish-Australian model and actress. She is known globally for her work for Victoria's Secret, the Sports Illustrated Swimsuit Issue, and Playboy, as well as being featured in the music video of "Duele el Corazón" by Enrique Iglesias.

== Early life ==
Gale was born and raised in Gothenburg, Sweden; she also lived in Ghana for four years, and in Australia. Her mother, Gita, who is a dentist and former pilot, was born in Pune, Maharashtra, India and was adopted by a Swedish family at age 5. Gale's father, Jeff, is a photographer and former footballer from Tatura, Victoria, Australia. Gale has two younger brothers.

Gale has been involved in sports since an early age. She played football with Näsets SK in Gothenburg and tennis since she was seven years old. She attended Näsetskolan and Göteborgs Högre Samskola.

At age 13, she was discovered by a model agent outside a coffee shop in Gothenburg. Initially, Gale's parents were opposed to her working as a model but she eventually started modeling one year later. One of her first modelling jobs was for H&M.

== Career ==
Gale's first big fashion show was Chanel in 2012.

In 2013, she was chosen to walk the Victoria's Secret Fashion Show for the first time, she has since walked the show in 2014, 2016, 2017 and 2018.

Gale has been in adverts and catalogues of H&M and H-I-G-H. She has walked runways for Azzedine Alaia, Chanel, Monique Lhuillier, Tommy Hilfiger, Band of Outsiders, Narciso Rodriguez, Badgley Mischka, Vivienne Tam, Ralph Lauren, Christopher Kane, Reem Acra, Tom Ford, Jean Paul Gaultier, John Galliano, Academy of Arts, Diane von Fürstenberg, Nanette Lepore, L'Wren Scott, Thomas Tait, Houghton, Rag & Bone and Victoria's Secret.

She has been featured on the cover of French Revue des Modes, and on editorials of Teen Vogue, Vogue Italia, Elle, Vogue India and Lucky.

In 2016, Gale was the Playboy Playmate of the Month for September 2016.

Gale leads a healthy lifestyle, paying particular attention to the type of food she eats. She trains for 2–3 hours each day and ramps up the tempo in the weeks prior to the Victoria's Secret Fashion Show. Her fitness regime includes power walking, jogging, boxing, and yoga.

Gale made her acting debut in the 2023 action thriller Plane. She starred in the 2024 science fiction film Uglies and in 2026 starred in sports action drama film Beast, and disaster horror film Deep Water.

== Personal life ==
Gale was in a long-term relationship with Swedish business manager, Johannes Jarl, who she met at school. As of early 2019, she has been in a relationship with Swedish actor Joel Kinnaman. She became engaged to Kinnaman in January 2021. The couple married in 2024 at the Burning Man Festival.

== Filmography ==
Year	Title	Role	Notes
2023	Plane	Katie Dhar	
2024	Uglies	Sage	
2026	Jo Nesbø's Detective Hole	Maya Ek	
2026	Beast	Luciana	
2026	Deep Water	Jaya	

Amberleigh West	Kristy Garett	Dree Hemingway	Camille Rowe	Brook Power	Josie Canseco
Ali Michael	Valerie van der Graaf	Kelly Gale	Allie Silva	Ashley Smith	Enikő Mihalik
