= Della Rae Morrison =

Aboriginal actress, songwriter and Bibulman Noongar activist

Della Rae Morrison is an Aboriginal actress, songwriter and activist of the Bibulman Noongar people.

The daughter of Patricia Morrison and Eddie Parfitt, she was born in Narrogin, Western Australia and grew up in Albany, Perth and South Hedland. She left school at the age of 14 and began working at a checkout counter to help support her family. She later attended Hedland Business College and began doing office work. She lived in Melbourne and Sydney, later returning to Perth.

Morrison began singing and acting at a young age. She performed in the musical Bran Nue Dae. Morrison appeared in the Australian children's television series Lockie Leonard and has also appeared in various theatre productions and film. She is musical director and co-founder of Madjitil Moorna, a community choir performing in the Nyungar language. Morrison and Jessie Lloyd, vocalists for the award-winning group Djiva, created the Chocolate Martini series of shows for National Indigenous Television.

In 2009, she was one of the founders of the West Australian Nuclear Free Alliance.

She also helped establish a Noongar tent embassy on Heirisson Island in 2012.

At the 2020 Perth Festival she played the title role in Yirra Yaakin Theatre Company's production of Hecate. The performance won her Best Actor (Female) at the Performing Arts WA Awards in 2021.

== Awards ==
=== WAM Song of the Year ===
The WAM Song of the Year was formed by the Western Australian Rock Music Industry Association Inc. (WARMIA) in 1985, with its main aim to develop and run annual awards recognising achievements within the music industry in Western Australia.

Year	Nominee / work	Award	Result (wins only)
2007	"Moodjebing" (with Jessie Lloyd)	World and Folk Song	Won
