= Lockie Leonard =

Fictional character by Tim Winton

Lockie Leonard is a fictional character and the protagonist of a trilogy of young adult novels by Australian author Tim Winton.

== Character ==
Lockie Leonard is a 12-year-old who moves to Angelus, a fictional, small coastal town in the southwest region of Western Australia. Lockie has to deal with starting high school in a new town, his father is a police officer who everybody calls Sarge, his mother Joy, is overly understanding, and his brother Phillip still wets the bed. The books follow his adventures and the disasters which beset him. From falling in love, being dumped, finding a best friend, being embarrassed by his family, and through it all making discoveries about himself.

The Lockie Leonard TV series, adapted from the books, was shot in Albany, Western Australia, and originally screened on the Nine Network in 2007, and a second season began airing in 2010. It was popular all around the world and still has many avid fans.

== Books in the series ==
=== Lockie Leonard, Human Torpedo ===
Published in 1990 the book has been republished several times by different publishers and in different formats (print, eBook, audio, braille) and languages (English, French, Dutch). Lockie Leonard is a teenage boy new in town who pines for the most unattainable girl in the class.

A stage version, dramatised by Paige Gibbs and published by Currency Press, was performed by the Perth Theatre Company 1995. It was first commissioned and performed by the WA Youth Theatre Company, Perth, in 1993. It won the following awards:

- 1991 Joint winner Western Australian Premier's Book Awards: Children's Book
- 1993 American Library Association Best Book for Young Adults Award
- 1996 Winner YABBA Awards: Fiction for Older Readers

=== Lockie Leonard, Scumbuster ===
Published in 1993, the book has been republished several times by different publishers and in different formats (print, eBook, audio, braille) and languages (English, French). Lockie has been dumped by his girlfriend but finds a new friend Egg the metal head, wants to save the planet and has a new love interest.

Lockie Leonard, Scumbuster won the 1993 Wilderness Society Environment Award.

=== Lockie Leonard, Legend ===
Published in 1997, the book has been republished several times by different publishers and in different formats (print, eBook, audio, braille) and languages (English, French). With the first year of High School behind him, Lockie finds embarrassing behaviour from all his family members but then events occur and Lockie makes some discoveries about himself.

Lockie Leonard, Legend won the 1998 Family Award for Children's Literature.

== See also ==
- Lockie Leonard (TV series) (2007–2010)
