= Asking for It (film) =

2021 film by Eamon O'Rourke

- Release poster
- Directed by: Eamon O'Rourke
- Written by: Eamon O'Rourke
- Produced by: Kiersey Clemons; Lee Broda; Ezra Miller; Luke Daniels
- Starring: Kiersey Clemons; Vanessa Hudgens; Alexandra Shipp; Ezra Miller; Gabourey Sidibe; Luke Hemsworth
- Cinematography: Jendra Jarnagin
- Edited by: RJ Cooper; Ethan Maniquis; Ninef Sargis
- Music by: Lilah Larson
- Production companies: Redwire Pictures; Sopherim; Tunnel Post
- Distributed by: Saban Films
- Release dates: June 13, 2021 (Tribeca); March 4, 2022
- Running time: 101 minutes
- Country: United States
- Language: English

Asking for It is a 2021 American thriller film written and directed by Eamon O'Rourke and starring Kiersey Clemons, Vanessa Hudgens, Alexandra Shipp, Ezra Miller, Gabourey Sidibe and Luke Hemsworth.

The film was released at the Tribeca Festival on June 13, 2021, before being released by Saban Films on March 4, 2022.

== Plot ==
Joey (Kiersey Clemons), a small-town waitress, befriends Regina (Alexandra Shipp), a regular customer at the diner where she works. After Joey experiences date rape from an old school acquaintance, Regina introduces her to the Cherry Bombers, an all-female vigilante gang. The group includes hot-headed Beatrice (Vanessa Hudgens) and their advisors Sal (Radha Mitchell) and Fala (Casey Camp-Horinek). United by their shared traumatic experiences at the hands of men, the Cherry Bombers have transformed their personal quests for vengeance into a broader mission to make misogynists suffer. The group is planning their most ambitious mission yet—targeting Mark Vanderhill (Ezra Miller), the leader of the Men’s First Movement (MFM), whose toxic rhetoric combines men’s rights activism and incel ideology. The film has been described as having a B-movie vibe as it portrays this group of radical feminists taking on incels and the patriarchy.

== Cast ==
- Kiersey Clemons as Joey
- Vanessa Hudgens as Beatrice
- Alexandra Shipp as Regina
- Ezra Miller as Mark Vanderhill
- Radha Mitchell as Sal
- Gabourey Sidibe as Rudy
- Casey Cott as Mike
- Leslie Stratton as Lily
- Casey Camp-Horinek as Fala
- Leyna Bloom as Jett
- Lisa Yaro as Angie
- Demetrius Shipp Jr. as Cuzzo
- Luke Hemsworth as Vernon
- David Patrick Kelly as Chief Morrill
- Patricia Belcher as Nana
- Wayne Dehart as Henry
- Ruby Ibarra as Hexus
- Eric Michael Cole as Officer Grumm
- Randy Wayne as Douchebag

== Production ==
Principal photography took place in Guthrie, Oklahoma for over a month in late 2019.

== Release ==
Asking for It had its world premiere at the 2021 Tribeca Festival on June 13. It was released in limited theaters and on VOD by Saban Films on March 4, 2022.

== Reception ==
On the review aggregator website Rotten Tomatoes, 22% of 32 critics' reviews are positive, with an average rating of 4.3/10. Metacritic, which uses a weighted average, assigned the film a score of 20 out of 100, based on seven critics, indicating "generally unfavorable" reviews.

Ferdosa of Screen Rant awarded the film one and a half stars out of five. Susannah Gruder of IndieWire graded the film a C−. Ciara Wardlow of RogerEbert.com awarded the film one star.

Jon Mendelsohn of Comic Book Resources gave the film a negative review and wrote that it "attempts a hard-hitting social commentary with a vibrant cast, but falls flat due to a lack of authenticity and follow-through." Jessica Kiang of Variety also gave the film a negative review, writing that it "is too much like its cardboard heroines: edgy on the outside, empty within." Jeannette Catsoulis of The New York Times also gave the film a negative review, calling it "a film that cares little for differentiating one violated woman — or one pasty-faced jerk — from another."
