= Lockie Leonard (TV series) =

Australian children's television series

- Genre: Children's Comedy-Drama
- Created by: Tim Winton
- Starring: Sean Keenan; Rhys Muldoon; Briony Williams; Corey McKernan; Clarence Ryan; Gracie Gilbert
- Theme music composer: Jebediah
- Opening theme: "Worlds Away"
- Ending theme: "Worlds Away"
- Country of origin: Australia
- Original language: English
- No. of series: 2
- No. of episodes: 52

Production
- Executive producers: Jo Horsburgh; Rosemary Blight
- Producers: Kylie du Fresne; Tony Tilse
- Production location: Albany, Western Australia
- Running time: 26 minutes

Original release
- Network: Nine Network
- Release: 19 June 2007 – 27 July 2010

Lockie Leonard is an Australian children's television series that was adapted from the Lockie Leonard books by Tim Winton. Filmed in Albany, Western Australia, the series premiere was on the Nine Network on 19 June 2007.

Lockie Leonard was produced by Goalpost Pictures Australia and is distributed by the Australian Children's Television Foundation. The theme song "Worlds Away" was performed by Jebediah.

Lockie Leonard first premiered in the UK on Jetix, airing from April 14, 2007, but would later premiere on 27 September 2008 as part of the children's Saturday morning programme TMi which airs from 09:00 to 10:30 on BBC Two. It ran for the first 12 episodes then continued to air on CBBC Channel.

The show won the 2008 TV Week Logie Award for Best Children's Series, and star Sean Keenan (Lockie) was nominated for the Graham Kennedy Award for Most Outstanding New Talent. It won the 2007 AFI award for Best Children's Drama Series. The series was also nominated for the 2007 BAFTA Awards for Best International Children's Drama Series.

== Origin ==
The first TV series was adapted from the Lockie Leonard books, written by multi-award-winning West Australian author, Tim Winton. The three books in the series are Lockie Leonard, Human Torpedo; Lockie Leonard, Scumbuster; and Lockie Leonard, Legend. All books were distributed by Puffin International.

== Overview ==
=== Series one ===
The premise of the series is the same as the book series from which it is derived. Lockie Leonard is a surf rat who moves with his family to Angelus, a small coastal town in Western Australia. Lockie has to deal with starting high school in a new town with no friends and a house that is in danger of sinking into a swamp. After Lockie "nuts himself smacko in the goolies" (has an accident in which his surfboard strikes him in his "tricky bits"—testicles) in the surf on his second day in town, Lockie meets a headbanger named Egg, and the two eventually become best friends. Earlier that day, while enrolling at his new school, Lockie falls in love for the first time with Vicki Streeton, the smartest and richest girl in the entire school, whose father also happens to be the mayor of Angelus. The first series is spread over Lockie's first year spent in Angelus with his family. Later in the series, Lockie finds turmoil with relationships, with him getting together with Vicki Streeton, breaking up, getting back together, breaking up. He also struggles with home life, with his mother, Joy hospitalised with depression.

=== Series two ===
The second series follows Lockie Leonard's second year in Angelus, middle of nowhere, where Lockie must cope with new situations. Vicki leaves to go to boarding school, and Lockie makes friends with new girl Mel, to whom he is initially assigned "buddy duty". His best friend Egg decides to make a new best friend in school bully, Curtis, and begins dating Vicki's friend Sasha. Lockie's brother Phillip enters Angelus High a year early owing to his impressive intelligence, and discovers a new friend or two along the way. Meanwhile, poetry-loving Sarge must deal with the new constable at the police station, and Joy decides to get out of the house and set up a new radio station, Radio Angelus.

== Awards ==
=== Series 1 ===
- Award for Best Children's Drama 2007
- Award for Best Children's Television series 2007
- Sean Keenan won the Young Actor Award in 2007
- TV Week Logie Award for Best Children's Television series 2008

=== Series 2 ===
- Award nomination Best Children's Television Drama 2010
- Award nomination Lead Actor (Corey McKernan) 2010
- Award nomination Supporting Actor in a Television Drama (Rhys Muldoon) 2010

== Cast ==
=== Main ===
- Sean Keenan as Lachlan 'Lockie' Leonard
- Clarence Ryan as Geoffrey 'Egg' Eggleston
- Gracie Gilbert as Victoria Anne 'Vicki' Streeton
- Briony Williams as Joy Leonard
- Rhys Muldoon as Sarge Leonard
- Corey McKernan as Phillip Leonard
- Ella Maddy as Barbara "Blob" Leonard

=== Recurring and guest ===
- Melanie Lyons (as Melanie Munt) as Lisa (Series 1)
- Mike Dorsey as Pop
- Alice Dale as Nan
- Jorden Silver as Curtis
- Tiarna Clarke as Dorothy 'Dot' Cook (Series 1)
- Trevor Jamieson as Rev. Eggleston
- Della Rae Morrison as Mrs. Eggleston (Series 1)
- Richard Mellick as Mayor Barry Streeton
- Christie Sistrunk as Mrs. Sally Streeton
- Mitchell Page as Colin 'Monster' Streeton (Series 1)
- James Beck as Josh Woodpond (Series 2)
- Laura Fairclough as Melanie 'Mel' Lamb (Series 2)
- Verity Gorman as Sasha Thompson-Baxter
- Nicholas Rechichi as Joe Ramir (Series 2)
- Cameron Findlay as Boof (Series 1)
- Ewen Leslie as John East (Series 1)
- Karli-Rae Grogan as Heidi (Series 1)
- Chanel Marriott as Kirstina (Series 2)

== Episodes ==
=== Series one ===
(Episode information retrieved from Australian Television Information Archive).

No. overall	No. in season	Title	Directed by	Written by	Original release date
1	1	"The Human Torpedo"	Tony Tilse	Keith Thompson	19 June 2007
2	2	"Stormy Mondays"	Tony Tilse	Keith Thompson	20 June 2007
3	3	"Lockie Chickens Out"	Tony Tilse	Keith Thompson	21 June 2007
4	4	"To Cheat or Not to Cheat"	Tony Tilse	Keith Thompson	26 June 2007
5	5	"Cyril"	Tony Tilse	Keith Thompson	27 June 2007
6	6	"A Water Feature"	Tony Tilse	Keith Thompson	28 June 2007
7	7	"Match of the Day"	Wayne Blair	Keith Thompson & James Bogle	3 July 2007
8	8	"The Details"	Wayne Blair	Keith Thompson	4 July 2007
9	9	"Weird Genes"	Wayne Blair	David Ogilvy	5 July 2007
10	10	"Miracles"	Roger Hodgman	David Ogilvy & Ken Kelso	10 July 2007
11	11	"X Marks the Dot"	James Bogle	Michael Miller	11 July 2007
12	12	"Dog Days"	Roger Hodgman	Shelley Birse	12 July 2007
13	13	"It's Not You, It's Me"	James Bogle	Matt Ford	17 July 2007
14	14	"Pure Poetry"	James Bogle	Sarah Rossetti	18 July 2007
15	15	"The Ladder of Love"	Peter Templeman	Keith Thompson	19 July 2007
16	16	"Brothers"	Roger Hodgman	Leeanne Innes	24 July 2007
17	17	"Swamp Rat"	Peter Templeman	Drew Proffitt	25 July 2007
18	18	"Face the Fear"	Peter Templeman	Shelley Birse	26 July 2007
19	19	"Lockie Takes the Cake"	James Bogle	Matt Ford	31 July 2007
20	20	"The Clock's Tickin'"	Roger Hodgman	Matt Ford	1 August 2007
21	21	"Zig Zag Hill"	James Bogle	David Ogilvy	2 August 2007
22	22	"Angels and Monsters"	James Bogle	Michael Miller	7 August 2007
23	23	"Boredom Busters"	Roger Hodgman	Shelley Birse	8 August 2007
24	24	"Barry Goes Pop"	Roger Hodgman	Michael Miller	9 August 2007
25	25	"The Domino Effect"	Roger Hodgman	Leeanne Innes	14 August 2007
26	26	"Joy... to the World"	Roger Hodgman	Keith Thompson	15 August 2007

=== Series two ===
1. "New and Improved"
2. "The X Factor"
3. "Bubble Trouble"
4. "Pick a Winner"
5. "Life Map"
6. "Total Eclipse"
7. "The Silence of the Frogs"
8. "The Information Age"
9. "Time and Tide"
10. "...It Happens"
11. "Snake Hide Oil"
12. "The Big Questions"
13. "The Party"
14. "Enter the Mermaid"
15. "A Head of the Team"
16. "Cure for Stings"
17. "A Musical Moment"
18. "Laugh with the Leonards"
19. "Aliens in Angelus"
20. "Buried Treasure"
21. "Second Best in Show"
22. "I, Monster"
23. "Trixie Wants to Party"
24. "Not So Perfect Storm"
25. "Crimes of the Heartless"
26. "Legend"

== Second series ==
The second series of Lockie Leonard was filmed in 2009 and screened in Australia on the Nine Network and WIN in 2010. The cast list remained unchanged, with new and original stories formulated by the show's writers. The new series follows a more mature Lockie's adventures and is once again set in Albany, Western Australia. The episode guide was announced online on 6 December 2009, on the Australian Television website.

The second series first screened on 17 May 2010 on Nickelodeon New Zealand, and the Nine Network in Australia on 21 August 2010, continuing weekly. In the United States, the series began airing on 21 June 2010 on Disney XD at 9:30am. In Latin America, the series premiered on Wednesday, 2 June 2010 on Boomerang. In the United Kingdom, it began airing Monday 2 August 2010 and continued daily (except on Fridays) on the CBBC channel at 11:30am.

== DVD release ==
A DVD box set of the first series of Lockie Leonard was released in Australia in mid-August 2008, and the UK on 19 July 2010, with the second series scheduled for release in Australia on 2 March 2011 by Universal Studios, and later in 2011 by Revelation Films for the UK.

DVD	Release date
Lockie Leonard: The Complete Series 1	August 2008 (Australia), July 2010 (United Kingdom)
Lockie Leonard: Series 2, Part 1	March 2011 (Australia), December 2011 (United Kingdom)
Lockie Leonard: Series 2, Part 2	December 2011 (Australia), March 2012 (United Kingdom)

== See also ==
- List of Australian television series
