= Bosch & Rockit =

2022 film

- Directed by: Tyler Atkins
- Written by: Tyler Atkins; Drue Metz
- Produced by: Jamie Arscott; Tyler Atkins; Cathy Flannery; John Schwarz
- Starring: Rasmus King; Luke Hemsworth
- Cinematography: Ben Nott; Shane Fletcher
- Edited by: Scott Gray
- Music by: Brian Cachia
- Release date: 2022
- Running time: 106 minutes
- Country: Australia
- Language: English

Bosch & Rockit, also known as Ocean Boy, is a 2022 Australian drama film co-written and directed by Tyler Atkins. It is based on Atkins' own experiences growing up. It stars Luke Hemsworth and Rasmus King in the title roles as Bosch and Rockit respectively.

== Plot ==
Bosch (Luke Hemsworth) and his son Rockit (Rasmus King) live in an unidentified beach community on the NSW North Coast where Bosch runs an illegal marijuana farm. A bushfire reveals his weed farm to the police who make Bosch a person of interest and Bosch tells his son that they are going on a magical journey north to Byron Bay. Arriving in Byron Bay with no accommodation booked, they create a basic tent on the beach where they surf all day, cook up dinner and camp out. Bosch meets an attractive young local called Deb, who suggests they stay at a local motel owned by her mother. Bosch offers three months accommodation up-front and it is there that Rockit meets his initial friend and then love interest, Ash-Ash. They explore Byron Bay together and slowly their friendship grows closer over time turning into a love interest. Bosch's relationship with Deb also grows stronger over time as they spend more time together. Bosch and Rockit are pulled over after a surfing trip as the number plates are flagged in the police system and Bosch lies about his identity to get away. A corrupt cop who is owed money by Bosch from his weed farm tracks Bosch to the Byron Bay hospital but Bosch closely escapes again. Deb loans her vehicle to Bosch knowing that the police are after him and Bosch heads further north to deliver Rockit to his mother on the Gold Coast. Bosch tells his son that he has to sort some stuff out in his life and that he will see his son soon.

Rockit discovers that his love interest Ash-Ash also lives on the Gold Coast and their relationship blossoms. A year after Bosch left, Rockit's mother tells him that they are visiting their Uncle. When they arrive at an old abandoned shack, Rockit's mother says that she needs to go to the bottle shop. Rockit discovers his dad, Bosch, at this abandoned shack and is initially confused about what is going on. Bosch reveals that Rockit's mother couldn't handle looking after him and has brought him back to his dad. Rockit realises that his dad is struggling with life and gets a job as a deckhand on a prawn trawler. Rockit sees an opportunity for Bosch, with a deckhand opportunity on a boat heading to Fiji. They bid goodbye as Bosch boards the boat to Fiji and Rockit finds Ash-Ash.

== Cast ==
- Luke Hemsworth as Bosch
- Rasmus King as Rockit
- Leeanna Walsman as Elizabeth
- Savannah La Rain as Ash-Ash
- Martin Sacks as Derek
- Michael Sheasby as Keith
- Isabel Lucas as Deb

== Reception ==
On review aggregator Rotten Tomatoes, the film has an approval rating of 56% based on 16 reviews.

Writing in The Sydney Morning Herald Paul Byrnes gave it 3 1/2 stars stating "This is a young director favouring mood over plot, soundtrack over action, like thousands before him. The last act needed a disciplined edit, but I can understand the constraints." In news.com.au Wenlei Ma give it 3 stars and states "The movie itself is an appealing story which also features the beautiful backdrop of the NSW north coast and some stunning cinematography to capture it. It also has a phenomenal performance from King, a professional surfer who holds the screen with his magnetic presence. " The Guardians' Luke Buckmaster gives it a 2 star review finishing "At this point, having been exposed to so many dolphins and whales, and all that dewy-eyed dialogue, I thought I could no longer be surprised by this film's cheesiness. I was wrong. The scene ends with Rockit asking Ash-Ash to “stay a little longer — just ’til we catch a shooting star”."

== Awards ==
- 12th AACTA Awards
  - Best Sound -Sam Hayward - nominated
