= The Signal (2014 film) =

2014 film by William Eubank

- Theatrical release poster
- Directed by: William Eubank
- Written by: Carlyle Eubank; David Frigerio; William Eubank
- Produced by: Nimra Rafaqat; Brian Kavanaugh-Jones; Tyler Davidson
- Starring: Brenton Thwaites; Olivia Cooke; Beau Knapp; Lin Shaye; Robert Longstreet; Laurence Fishburne
- Cinematography: David Lanzenberg
- Edited by: Brian Berdan
- Music by: Nima Fakhrara
- Production companies: Low Spark Films; IM Global
- Distributed by: Focus Features
- Release dates: January 20, 2014 (Sundance); June 13, 2014 (United States)
- Running time: 97 minutes
- Country: United States
- Language: English
- Budget: $4 million
- Box office: $2.4 million

The Signal is a 2014 American science fiction thriller film directed by William Eubank, written by William and Carlyle Eubank and David Frigerio, and starring Brenton Thwaites and Laurence Fishburne. It premiered at the 2014 Sundance Film Festival, and was theatrically released in the United States on June 13, 2014.

== Plot ==
Three MIT students Jonah, Nic, and Haley are on a road trip to take Haley to California. This decision has been adding stress to Nic and Haley's romantic relationship. Nic has limited mobility and uses forearm crutches to walk around. Haley feels Nic is distancing himself from her but Nic explains that he doesn't want his muscular dystrophy to hold her back. Haley is in tears listening to Nic and breaks up with him.

During their stay in a hotel, Nic and Jonah discover that a hacker named NOMAD (who nearly got Jonah and Nic expelled for breaking into MIT servers), has found their location and is taunting them with strange and ominous emails. NOMAD also hacks one of their laptops and activates their camera feed remotely. Nic and Jonah are livid and immediately start tracking NOMAD. They identify the IP from which NOMAD hacked their laptop and translate that into a physical address.

On the way, they receive emails with real-time photos of Haley's car from a traffic camera. They track NOMAD to an abandoned house in the middle of Nevada near their path and decide to investigate, reaching the house in the middle of the night. After finding nothing in the house, Nic and Jonah rush outside when they hear Haley screaming. The two black out as Haley is pulled into the air by an unseen force.

Nic wakes up in a strange and sterile underground research facility, with the number 2.3.5.41 tattooed on his arm. He is questioned by Dr. Wallace Damon, who is wearing a hazmat suit. Nic is not able to move his limbs, even though he is conscious. He is limited to moving around in a wheelchair. Dr. Damon tells Nic what they encountered near the house was an extraterrestrial biological entity. Damon shows footage from Nic's own video camera and pauses once an alien face can be seen.

Nic is taken to his room where he hears Jonah talking to him through a small vent in the wall, saying his "body feels weird". Nic also notices that his legs, previously weak but functional, are now completely numb. When Dr. Damon questions Nic again, Nic unsuccessfully tries to get answers about Haley's condition (whom he saw in a coma in one of the rooms at the facility). Following an unexplained experiment on a cow in another part of the facility, a security alarm goes off and Nic, along with other personnel, finds large dents with scorch marks on the walls of the facility and no sign of Jonah.

Nic asks Damon where Jonah went, but Damon says Jonah was "never recovered" from the house. Nic tries to break Haley out but is intercepted. After Nic is restrained, he's shocked to discover that his legs have been amputated and replaced by advanced prosthetic legs. Nic then uses these high-powered limbs to break himself and Haley out of the facility and discovers they're in the middle of a vast barren desert.

After hitching a ride with an old woman, Nic and Haley hijack an 18-wheeler truck to find a way around the seemingly endless canyon that extends around the facility and surrounding area. At a visitors' center, they find Jonah in a hazmat suit, disguised as one of the workers. Jonah reveals that his forearms and hands have been replaced with the same alien technology as Nic's legs.

Jonah speculates that they are in Area 51 (because they both have the same tattooed number, which adds up to 51). After Nic discovers indications of advanced technology implanted in Haley's spine, the trio drive up to a military checkpoint. Jonah tries to hack into their computer system, only to be stopped by gunfire from the facility personnel, which damage his glasses and ruins his ability to see the computer clearly.

Nic and Jonah hug as the latter, fatally wounded, prepares for his final stand, allowing Nic and Haley to escape. Jonah uses his prosthetic high-tech arms to subdue the soldiers. As Nic and Haley approach the bridge that leads to the outside world, they run into Damon and his armed personnel, who blow out the truck's tires with spikes. Haley is evacuated by helicopter beyond the canyon, and knowing that Nic has mastered the use of his legs, Damon attempts to discourage Nic, saying "You can't reach her". After hearing a loud horn coming from the sky, Nic looks at Damon’s name tag and he realizes that Damon is NOMAD ("Damon" spelled backwards). Damon explains that it was Nic who came looking for him, and then adds that Nic is "the perfect integration of human will and alien technology… Our finest achievement". Agitated, Nic uses his bionic legs to sprint at supersonic speed across the bridge, where he breaks through an invisible barrier.

Nic finds himself inside a larger exterior facility. Housed within it can be seen the Earth-like world within the canyon city. Damon walks up to Nic and removes his helmet to reveal that he is actually a robotic alien with a human-like face. Nic turns around, and through the glass sees stars and outer space. He realizes he is not in a government facility, but is actually on an immense alien spacecraft numbered 2.3.5.41 (matching the numerical tattoo on his arm) that is docking at their home world. A zoom-out view reveals the entire ship, with a parabolic sun shield on top and a large alien city, complete with skyscrapers, pointing away from the alien sun. Another, similar city-ship can be seen in the distance.

== Cast ==
- Brenton Thwaites as Nic Eastman
- Laurence Fishburne as Dr. Wallace Damon
- Olivia Cooke as Haley Peterson
- Beau Knapp as Jonah Breck
- Lin Shaye as Mirabelle
- Robert Longstreet as James
- Jeffrey Grover as Gil, Gas Station Clerk

== Themes ==
The filmmakers have stated that they wrote the film primarily as an exploration of the conflict between logic and emotion. Director William Eubank stated in an interview, "The Signal, for me, is about choices and sort of what drives somebody – the decisions we make, whether we make them based on thinking logically or thinking emotionally. Nic is sort of a character who's being – he wants to be logical, because he believes from his computer background that is a stronger way to live your life, and that's a more reasonable way to live your life. Black and white decisions, yes or nos. Then he's sort of challenged to make an emotional choice. At the very start, he was sort of trying to push those emotions away... At the end of the movie, he chooses to embrace that emotional side and make a choice based on a feeling."

Co-writer Carlyle Eubank explained the film similarly, saying "The real crux of the film is how the characters... find who they are as people through adversity."

Actor Brenton Thwaites stated the film's metaphoric message of following one's heart over reason was what drew him to the project, saying "I love the little messages and metaphors throughout the film that tell you to really chase what you believe in and follow your heart... the message is so beautiful."

Screenwriter David Frigerio echoed his co-writers' sentiments in his explanation of the film's themes:

Once Singularity hits and people start getting really smart, like a million times smarter than we are now—and that might not be that far off in the distance...where does that put human emotions? Because let's face it, if you're dealing in science alone, emotions are a waste of time because they just block you down. So that was one of our big questions. We got these kids from MIT. This kid has everything going for him... and then he's struck down with this muscular dystrophy and now his whole life is different. And he's trying to deal with it... only to realize later it's his emotions that make him human, to be who he is. We really wanted to emphasize that.

Through metaphor, the film intends to explore the idea that though sometimes humans may attempt to live their lives based on rules and logic, working diligently to suppress their feelings, deep down there are emotions that cannot be eliminated. The so-called "Signal" is that internal gnawing fire of a human's inner voice that can tell what is true if listened for, and that makes humans human. Eubank explained the meaning of the film's title by saying the "Signal" is a "waiting for something, listening for something, having an open heart... there's levels of what the 'Signal' really is."

In the film, the character Nic finally listens and hears "The Signal", and in a fiery burst discovers his true feeling, love. Having found his emotions, Nic chooses to follow a course of action based on love. Eubank discussed this in saying the critical part of the film is "to watch [Nic] arc out, to decide 'You know what, I’ve been trying to think logically about this the whole time... and [have] always been trying to run away from my emotions, here's a situation that says logically I shouldn't do this or I'm at great risk if I do this, so logically I should do nothing.' And he decides to do something, and to go for it, and he embraces it." This decision flies in the face of logic, but trusting love empowers him, and the transformation enables him to break out of the allegorical cave of darkness he had formerly found himself in and out into the wide field of reality.

At Sundance, the filmmakers and actor Brenton Thwaites described the film as a Twilight Zone–style story, drawing heavily on Plato's Allegory of the Cave, and intended as a modern interpretation of the 1939 film The Wizard of Oz, an element later noted by reviewers.

The film utilizes nontraditional storytelling directions, which have frustrated some reviewers.

== Production ==
Laurence Fishburne joined the cast on May 9, 2013.

Filming began in May 2013 in New Mexico, on locations including Albuquerque, Los Lunas and Taos. The New Mexico Film Office also announced the start of filming. On June 18 and 19, crews were filming scenes on the Rio Grande Gorge Bridge.

=== Music ===
The film's score was written by Nima Fakhrara who designed experimental musical instruments to construct the resonant soundscapes. A soundtrack album was released by Varèse Sarabande on June 10, 2014.

== Distribution ==
=== Marketing ===
On March 18, 2014, a teaser poster and some photos from the film were released, followed by the first official trailer next day. On March 26, 2014, Focus revealed a new poster for the film. On May 27, "ruagitated.com" was launched.

=== Theatrical release ===
Originally supposed to be released by FilmDistrict, the project was transferred to Focus Features after the latter absorbed the former. Focus Features released the film worldwide on June 13, 2014 and in a limited release in North America for five weeks, grossing $600,896.

=== Home media ===
The Signal was released in a Blu-ray/DVD/Digital HD combo pack on September 23, 2014 by Focus Features and Universal Studios Home Entertainment. It earned $1,212,804 in video sales in the United States.

== Reception ==
As of September 2026, the film holds a 60% approval rating on review aggregator Rotten Tomatoes, based on 87 reviews with an average rating of 5.80 out of 10. The site's consensus says, "Director William Eubank clearly has big ideas and an impressive level of technical expertise; unfortunately, The Signal fritters them away on a poorly constructed story." The film received a score of 54 out of 100 on Metacritic, based on 34 reviews.

Entertainment Weekly gave the film a "B" rating, saying, "Hard science fiction meets tender hearts in a slow-burn, twist-filled thriller... The trio wind up in an abandoned shack in the middle of the Nevada desert, where they are attacked by forces unknown. It gets worse!... What is happening? Will Nic escape? And do we even want him to, given that the facility's workers all wear protective suits when interacting with their guests/test subjects?" The review concludes that "all this sounds like a souped-up episode of The Twilight Zone or The X-Files."

Nicolas Rapold of The New York Times wrote, "William Eubank's The Signal demonstrates the fine line between paranoid science-fiction fantasy and demo reel... After a brief excursion into found-footage horror, Nic wakes up in one of those antiseptic, white-walled secret compounds used for human experimentation in the movies. Mr. Eubank plays with our minds, and Nic's, for a while." Rapold judges that "the story evolves into a kind of poor man's X-Men", though "the grandiosity of the film's setups partly fits in with the guys' sense of righteous-geek drama, and you wouldn't be surprised to see Mr. Eubank directing a bigger-budget movie down the road..."

Michael O'Sullivan of The Washington Post gave the film a one-and-a-half star rating and a half-scathing review: "Two of the major plot turns in The Signal—a good-looking sci-fi thriller with more fashion sense than brains—hinge on misdirection involving simple arithmetic and spelling. I won't spoil the fun by elaborating further, but when each moment arrives, it's cheapened by the implicit insult to the audience's intelligence. The twists feel less like jolts of genuine surprise than like being had by a third-grader with a good knock-knock joke." O'Sullivan adds, "I'll say one thing: The general state of confusion fostered by the head-scratching plot is a surprisingly effective way of maintaining continued engagement with it—if by 'engagement' you mean 'This better lead somewhere.' Oh, it does. It's just a less than wholly satisfying destination, despite some fun detours. (Veteran character actress Lin Shay, in a nutty little cameo, is one such pleasure.)"

In contrast, USA Today wrote, "Had Stanley Kubrick and David Lynch made a movie together, it might have looked something like The Signal. Visually stunning, emotionally stunted and weird as all get-out, this sci-fi tale (**1/2 stars out of four, rated PG-13...) isn't worthy of the canon of either master of disturbing imagery. But Signal thinks big, takes chances and has enough arresting scenes to stand apart from the science fiction films of late... Signal is so determined to remain mysterious—and pack a visual punch at the movie's climax—that it withholds too much... Instead, Signal aims to get you thinking. The story can be maddening to follow, but it sure is cool to look at."

Geoff Berkshire, who watched the film at the 2014 Sundance Film Festival, gave a similarly admiring yet disappointed review, calling it "Indebted to both District 9 and The Blair Witch Project, but unlikely to enjoy either of those films' sleeper success": "Exceedingly stylish and ultimately quite silly, The Signal is a sci-fi head trip better appreciated for the journey than the destination. The less audiences know going in, the more intrigued they'll be by the story's not entirely predictable twists and turns." He writes that when "the film pulls its flashiest twist, which turns Nic into something like the Six Billion Dollar Teen", "it's also the clear highlight of a film more interested in surface flash than in narrative coherence or character depth."

== See also ==
- Alien abduction
- Dark City (1998 film)
