= Rasmus King =

Australian actor

- Occupation: Actor
- Notable work: Bosch & Rockit; 6 Festivals

Rasmus King is an Australian actor and surfer. He starred in the films Bosch & Rockit and 6 Festivals. He played Daniel Johns in the semi autobiographical short film What if the Future Never Happened? and had a small part in Barons. Along with his brother Kyuss King and their neighbour Bon he formed the band Headsend.
