= Liam Hemsworth =

Australian actor (born 1990)

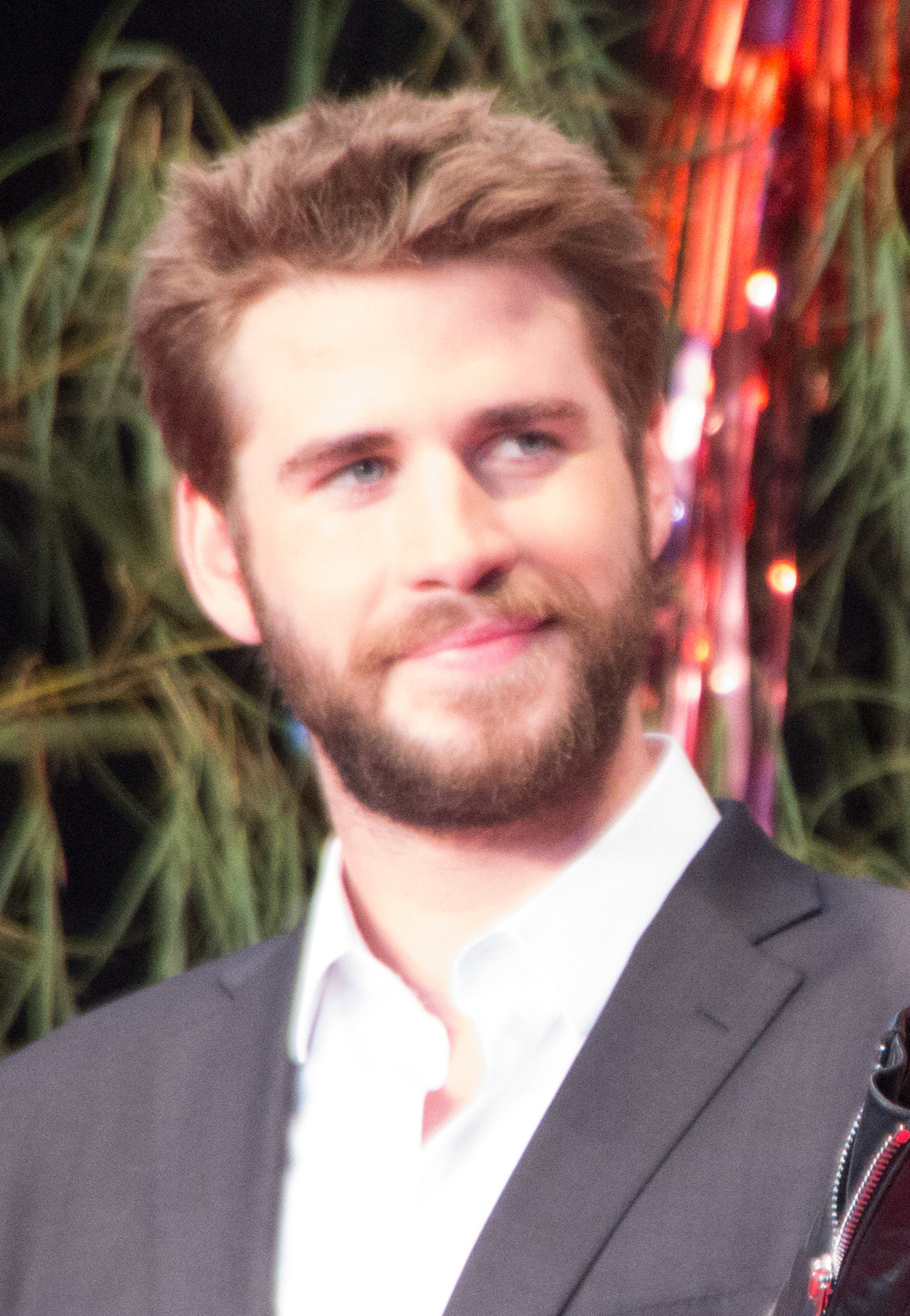
- Hemsworth at the Japan premiere of Independence Day: Resurgence in 2016
- Born: 13 January 1990 (age 36); Melbourne, Victoria, Australia
- Occupation: Actor
- Years active: 2007–present
- Spouse: Miley Cyrus (m. 2018; div. 2020)
- Partner: Gabriella Brooks (eng. 2025)
- Relatives: Luke Hemsworth (brother); Chris Hemsworth (brother); Joanne van Os (aunt); India Rose Hemsworth (niece)

Liam Hemsworth (born 13 January 1990) is an Australian actor. He played the roles of Josh Taylor in the soap opera Neighbours and Marcus in the children's television series The Elephant Princess. In American films, Hemsworth starred as Will Blakelee in The Last Song (2010), as Gale Hawthorne in The Hunger Games film series (2012–2015), and as Jake Morrison in Independence Day: Resurgence (2016).

== Early life ==
Hemsworth was born on 13 January 1990 in Melbourne, Australia, to Leonie (née van Os), an author, and Craig Hemsworth, a social-services counsellor. He has two older brothers, Chris Hemsworth and Luke Hemsworth, who are also actors. His maternal grandfather is a Dutch immigrant, and his other ancestry is Irish, English, German, and Scottish. Hemsworth has said that though there is competition for jobs among them, it is friendly: "We are brothers and we are always competitive, but it is a good thing, it pushes us and we are always happy whenever someone books something."

When Hemsworth was in year 8 high school, he and his family relocated to Phillip Island, a small Australian island southeast of Melbourne where he spent much of his time there surfing with his brothers. In March 2009, Hemsworth moved to the United States to pursue his acting career. He and his brother Chris first stayed in the guest house of Chris's manager, William Ward, before renting their own Los Angeles apartment.

== Career ==
=== 2007–2010: Career beginnings ===
Prior to becoming an actor, Hemsworth laid floors for six months. He began to seriously consider following his elder brothers' footsteps in high school by participating in school plays. Eventually, Hemsworth retained an agent. He attended his first audition at the age of sixteen and began his career in 2007 with guest appearances on the TV shows Home and Away and McLeod's Daughters. The week of 8 July 2007, Hemsworth began filming episodes for Neighbours, an Australian soap opera his brother Luke had previously starred in. Hemsworth's character, Josh Taylor, was a recurring character from 2007 to 2008. In the show, Josh was an athletic paraplegic who supported and began a relationship with character Bridget Parker after she was paralysed down one side of her body in a car crash. In 2008, Hemsworth began acting on the children's television show The Elephant Princess, playing "Marcus", the lead guitarist of the protagonist's band. Hemsworth later had roles in the television series Satisfaction and starred in the British film Triangle. He also made a brief appearance as an MIT student in the film Knowing.

In 2009, Hemsworth was selected to act opposite Sylvester Stallone in Stallone's 2010 film, The Expendables, but his character was written out of the script (Hemsworth later co-starred in The Expendables 2). Hemsworth's brother, Chris, told Movieline that just a few hours after Hemsworth learned he would not appear in The Expendables, director Kenneth Branagh called to ask him to test for the lead role in the 2011 film Thor. Hemsworth moved to the States in March 2009 for screen tests. Though he eventually lost the role to Chris in May, Disney announced later the same week that Hemsworth had landed the part of Will Blakelee in the 2010 drama The Last Song, based on the Nicholas Sparks novel by the same name. Hemsworth plays the love interest of Miley Cyrus's character in the film. Nikki Finke reported that Hemsworth had been in Los Angeles for just three weeks and had not yet found an agent when he was cast. Hemsworth next appeared in the music video for Cyrus' "When I Look at You" which was recorded on 16 August 2009.

In September 2009, Hemsworth appeared at a dinner event to promote Foxtel, an Australian pay television company. In March 2010, Details magazine selected Hemsworth as one of their predictions for "The Next Generation of Hollywood's Leading Men". Later that month, it was announced that Hemsworth was in negotiations to star in Arabian Nights, a 3D action film that will be directed by Chuck Russell for Inferno Entertainment. It was later confirmed that he will be starring in the movie. He has also reportedly been offered the lead role in Northern Lights after Taylor Lautner withdrew from the David Ellison-financed project.

Hemsworth was the Nickelodeon Australian Kids' Choice Awards 2010 host. He and Miley Cyrus won the "Fave Kiss" category.

Hemsworth starred in the music video for "Colder Weather" by the Zac Brown Band.

=== 2011–present: The Hunger Games series and beyond ===
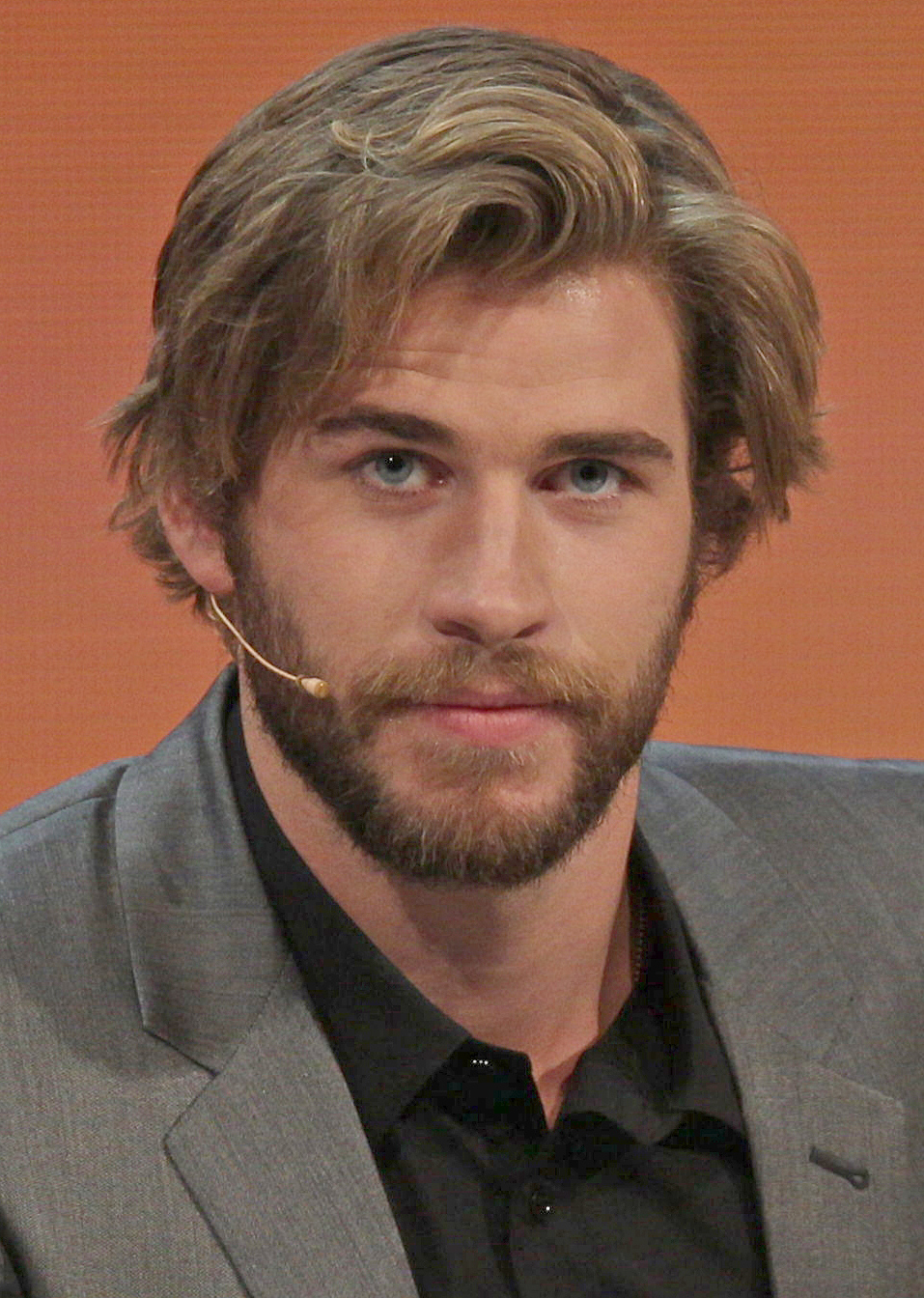
Hemsworth in 2014

On 4 April 2011, Lionsgate announced Hemsworth to be one of the leads, Gale Hawthorne, in The Hunger Games, which was released in 2012. In June 2011, he became attached to war drama Love and Honor which also stars Aimee Teegarden and Teresa Palmer.

In 2013, Hemsworth appeared in Empire State, with Emma Roberts, and Paranoia, co-starring Harrison Ford, Gary Oldman and Amber Heard. He reprised his role, Gale Hawthorne, in three sequels to The Hunger Games, The Hunger Games: Catching Fire, released in November 2013, The Hunger Games: Mockingjay – Part 1, released in November 2014, and The Hunger Games: Mockingjay – Part 2, released in November 2015.

In 2012, Hemsworth attended a benefit dinner organised by non-profit organisation Australians in Film with his then fiancée Miley Cyrus. It was their first public appearance together as an engaged couple.

In 2015, Hemsworth portrayed the love interest of Kate Winslet's character in the Australian literary adaptation The Dressmaker, which was filmed in Victoria in the summer of 2014. Hemsworth starred in director Roland Emmerich's 2016 film Independence Day: Resurgence. In 2019, following a three-year absence, he played a fantasy version of a romantic comedy leading man in the film Isn't It Romantic, and starred in the action crime film Killerman.

Hemsworth currently appears on the horror TV series, Most Dangerous Game, for Quibi, the short-form streaming platform. Hemsworth plays the lead role as a terminally ill man trying to provide for his pregnant wife before he dies.

In 2022, Hemsworth was set to star in the Netflix film Lonely Planet with Laura Dern. In October 2022, Netflix announced that Hemsworth would be replacing Henry Cavill as Geralt of Rivia from the start of Season 4 of The Witcher.

== Personal life ==
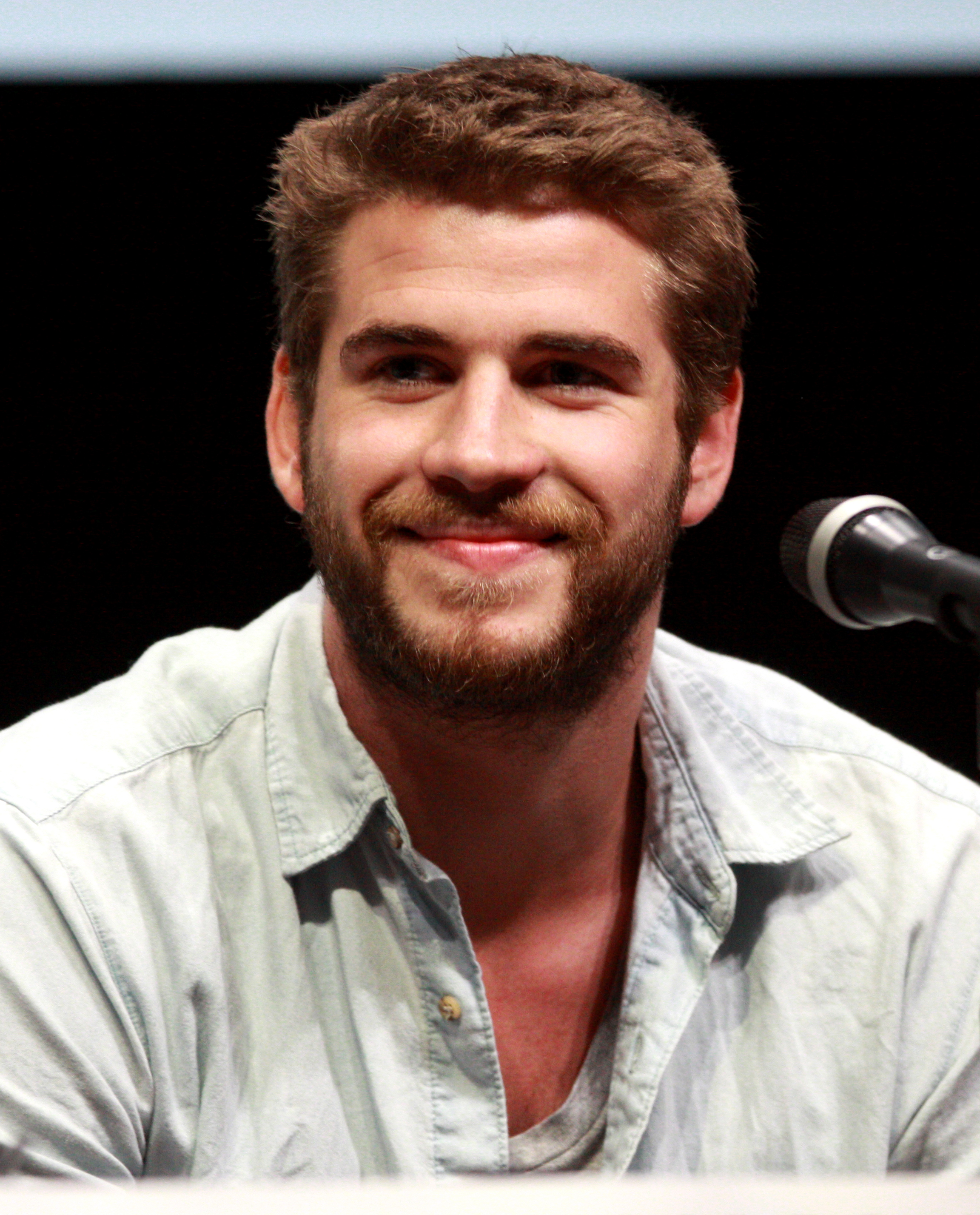
Hemsworth at 2013 San Diego ComicCon

As of 2012 Hemsworth was ambassador of the Australian Childhood Foundation, attributing his association with the foundation to his parents, who had worked in child protection for 20 years "and have only ever given me encouragement and support".

Hemsworth was vegan and told Men's Fitness in 2015 that he found "no negatives to eating like this. I feel nothing but positive, mentally and physically." In 2020, following hospitalization for kidney stones, he told Men's Health that he had to "completely rethink what [he] was putting in [his] body."

While filming The Last Song in June 2009, Hemsworth began a relationship with his co-star Miley Cyrus. After a three-year on-again, off-again relationship, the couple announced their engagement in June 2012. They lived together in Los Angeles but ended their engagement in September 2013. In October 2016, Cyrus confirmed that they were once again engaged. In November 2018, their home burned down in the Woolsey Fire, In his social media posts he encouraged his followers to donate to The Malibu Foundation and to Cyrus's non-profit organisation the Happy Hippie Foundation. In November 2018, the couple made a joint $500,000 donation to The Malibu Foundation through the Happy Hippie Foundation. Hemsworth and Cyrus married on 23 December 2018 at their home in Nashville, Tennessee. On 10 August 2019, Cyrus announced their separation. Eleven days later, Hemsworth filed for divorce, citing irreconcilable differences,and the divorce was finalised on 28 January 2020.

After his separation from Cyrus, Hemsworth began a relationship with Australian model Gabriella Brooks. In September 2025, Brooks confirmed via Instagram that the couple were engaged.

== Filmography ==
=== Film ===
| Year | Film | Role | Notes |
|---|---|---|---|
| 2009 | Knowing | Spencer | |
| 2009 | Triangle | Victor | |
| 2010 | The Last Song | Will Blakelee | |
| 2012 | The Hunger Games | Gale Hawthorne | |
| 2012 | The Expendables 2 | Billy "The Kid" Timmons | |
| 2013 | Love and Honor | Mickey Wright | |
| 2013 | Paranoia | Adam Cassidy | |
| 2013 | Empire State | Chris Potamitis | |
| 2013 | The Hunger Games: Catching Fire | Gale Hawthorne | |
| 2014 | Cut Bank | Dwayne McLaren | |
| 2014 | The Hunger Games: Mockingjay – Part 1 | Gale Hawthorne | |
| 2015 | The Dressmaker | Ted McSwiney | |
| 2015 | The Hunger Games: Mockingjay – Part 2 | Gale Hawthorne | |
| 2016 | Independence Day: Resurgence | Jake Morrison | |
| 2016 | The Duel | David Kingston | |
| 2019 | Isn't It Romantic | Blake | |
| 2019 | Killerman | Moe | |
| 2020 | Arkansas | Kyle | |
| 2022 | Poker Face | Michael Nankervis | |
| 2024 | Land of Bad | Kinney | |
| 2024 | Lonely Planet | Owen Brophy | |
| TBA | The Kellys † | TBA | Post-production |
| TBA | Non Compos Mentis † | TBA | Post-production |

=== Television ===
| Year | Film | Role | Notes |
|---|---|---|---|
| 2007 | Home and Away | Unknown | Season 20, Episode 42 (#4372) |
| 2007 | McLeod's Daughters | Damo | Episode: "Leaving the Nest" |
| 2007–2008 | Neighbours | Josh Taylor | 19 episodes |
| 2008–2009 | The Elephant Princess | Marcus | 18 episodes |
| 2009 | Satisfaction | Marc | 2 episodes |
| 2015 | The Muppets | Himself | Episode: "Bear Left Then Bear Write" |
| 2016 | Workaholics | Cushing Ward | Episode: "Wolves of Rancho" |
| 2020 | Most Dangerous Game | Dodge Maynard | Lead |
| 2025–present | The Witcher | Geralt of Rivia | Lead; Seasons 4–5 |

=== Music videos ===
| Year | Title | Artist | Role | Ref. |
|---|---|---|---|---|
| 2012 | "Decisions" | Borgore & Miley Cyrus | Cameo | |

== Awards and nominations ==
On 27 June 2012, Liam Hemsworth was presented with the Australians in Film Breakthrough Award for international success.

| Year | Award | Category | Work | Notes |
|---|---|---|---|---|
| 2010 | Young Hollywood Awards | Breakthrough of the Year | The Last Song | Won |
| 2010 | Nickelodeon Australian Kids' Choice Awards | Favorite Kiss (with Miley Cyrus) | The Last Song | Won |
| 2010 | Nickelodeon Australian Kids' Choice Awards | Cutest Couple (with Miley Cyrus) | The Last Song | Nominated |
| 2010 | Teen Choice Awards | Choice Movie Breakout Star – Male | The Last Song | Won |
| 2010 | Teen Choice Awards | Choice Movie – Liplock (with Miley Cyrus) | The Last Song | Nominated |
| 2010 | Teen Choice Awards | Choice Movie – Drama | The Last Song | Nominated |
| 2010 | Teen Choice Awards | Choice Movie – Dance Scene (with Miley Cyrus) | The Last Song | Nominated |
| 2010 | Teen Choice Awards | Choice Movie – Chemistry (with Miley Cyrus) | The Last Song | Nominated |
| 2012 | Teen Choice Awards | Choice Movie – Male Scene Stealer | The Hunger Games | Nominated |
| 2012 | People's Choice Awards | Favorite On Screen Chemistry (shared with Jennifer Lawrence and Josh Hutcherson) | The Hunger Games | Won |
| 2012 | MTV Movie Awards | Best Breakthrough Performance | The Hunger Games | Nominated |
| 2012 | MTV Movie Awards | Best Cast | The Hunger Games | Nominated |
| 2012 | Teen Choice Awards | Choice Hottie – Male | The Hunger Games | Nominated |
| 2014 | Teen Choice Awards | Choice Hottie – Male | The Hunger Games: Catching Fire | Nominated |
| 2014 | Teen Choice Awards | Choice Movie Actor – Sci-Fi | The Hunger Games: Catching Fire | Nominated |
| 2015 | Teen Choice Awards | Choice Movie Actor – Sci-Fi | The Hunger Games: Mockingjay – Part 1 | Nominated |
| 2015 | Teen Choice Awards | Choice Movie – Best Kiss (with Jennifer Lawrence) | The Hunger Games: Mockingjay – Part 1 | Nominated |
| 2017 | People's Choice Awards | Favorite Action Movie Actor | Independence Day: Resurgence | Nominated |
| 2019 | Teen Choice Awards | Choice Movie Actor – Comedy | Isn't It Romantic | Nominated |
| 2020 | Primetime Emmy Awards | Outstanding Short Form Comedy or Drama Series | Most Dangerous Game | Nominated |
| 2016 | Golden Eye Award (Zurich Film Festival) | The New A-Lister | | Won |

== See also ==
- List of Australian film actors
