= Invisibility Cloak =

Invisibility Cloak may refer to:

- Cloak of invisibility, a theme that has occurred in fiction
  - Invisibility cloak (Harry Potter), a specific instance in the Harry Potter series
- Cloaking device, technology for partial or full invisibility to parts of the electromagnetic or acoustic spectrums
  - Metamaterial cloaking, a type of cloaking using metamaterials
- Cap of invisibility (aidos kyneê in Greek), a mysterious helmet or cap that possesses the ability to turn the wearer invisible
- The Invisibility Cloak, a short novel by Chinese author Ge Fei.
