= Briony Williams =

Australian actress

- Born: 1967 (age 58–59)
- Occupation: Actress
- Years active: 2003–present

Briony Williams is an Australian actress. She is best known for her role as Joy, mother to Lockie and Phillip, in Lockie Leonard. She has appeared in the film Struck By Lightning, and the TV Series All Saints.

On Stage she has appeared in including as a Weird Sister (witch) in Macbeth (Wildfire Theatre, 2008) the Consultant in Customs (Sidetrack Theatre, 1998) Ilse in Spring Awakening (The Playhouse, 1991), Annabella in 'Tis Pity She's A Whore (Red Shed Theatre, 1990) and in Speed-the-Plow (Space Theatre, 1989). She was played in and co devised Rites of Memory and Desire: 2 (Belvoir Street Theatre and The Performance Space, 1994)

== Filmography ==
Year	Title	Role	Notes
1998	Blue Heelers	Deb Hill	1 episode
2000	Eugenie Sandler PI	Georgia	1 episode
2003–2008	All Saints	Alana Cato	Appeared in 2003, 2005 and 2008
2007–2010	Lockie Leonard	Joy Leonard	52 episodes
2011	Neighbours	Janet Green	1 episode
2013	Packed to the Rafters	Nicole	1 episode
2014	House Husbands	Nurse Jenny	1 episode
2017	Here Come the Habibs	Racist	1 episode
2018	Dead Lucky	Harriet Pierce	1 episode
2018	Rake	Amy	1 episode
2015–18	Home and Away	Edwina / Patricia	2 episodes
2019	Total Control	Peta Randall	1 episode
2021	The Unusual Suspects	Detective	2 episodes
2022	Awe-Stralia	Louise Flex	3 episodes

=== Film ===
Year	Title	Role	Notes
2022	6 Festivals	Sue	Film
2022	Lucky Peach	Marie	Short
2011	Remake	Homeowner	
2010	Complicity	Woman	Short
2003	Martha's New Coat	Denise	
2002	Guru Wayne	Interviewer	
1999	Girl Talk		Short
1990	Struck By Lightning	Gail	Film also known as Saltmarsh in U.S.
