= 6 Festivals =

2022 film

- Directed by: Macario de Souza
- Screenplay by: Macario de Souza; Sean Nash; Lou Sanz
- Produced by: Jade van der Lei; Michael Wrenn; Shannon Wilson-McClinton; Macario de Souza
- Starring: Rory Potter; Yasmin Honeychurch; Rasmus King
- Cinematography: Hugh Miller
- Edited by: Ahmad Halimi
- Music by: Blessed
- Production companies: Hype Republic; Superlative Pictures; Invisible Republic; Helium Pictures
- Distributed by: Bonsai Films; Paramount+
- Release dates: 10 June 2022 (Sydney Film Festival); 11 August 2022 (Australia); 25 August 2022 (Paramount+)
- Running time: 95 minutes
- Country: Australia
- Language: English

6 Festivals is a 2022 Australian drama film directed by Macario De Souza and starring Rory Potter, Yasmin Honeychurch and Rasmus King.

== Cast ==
- Rory Potter as James
- Yasmin Honeychurch as Summer
- Rasmus King as Maxie
- Guyala Bayles as Marley
- Kyuss King as Kane
- Briony Williams as Sue

== Reception ==
On review aggregator Rotten Tomatoes, the film has an approval rating of 100% based on 4 reviews.

In Time Out, Stephen A. Russell gives it 4 stars and states, "A monument to Australia's thriving music scene, it will have you whooping with joy one minute, then fighting back the tears the next. Destined to be a cult hit, it even made this reviewer, who thought his festival-hopping days were long behind him, reconsider jumping in the back of a ute, heading to a bush doof and getting lit. That’s some achievement." Writing in The Sydney Morning Herald, Paul Byrnes gave it 3 stars, stating, "The movie has deep reserves of energy and spirit. Who cares if it lacks a little polish when it has a strong sense of life?" The Guardians' Luke Buckmaster gives it a 2-star review, finishing, "Overt emotionalising has a way of corroding everything, turning the best of dramatic intentions (and what film isn’t well intended?) into schmaltzy goo. Young viewers will probably approach 6 Festivals wanting something fun and mildly rebellious – like drinking goon straight from the bag before sneaking into a festival – but discover a maudlin experience instead."
