= Digital imaging technician =

Job in the motion picture industry

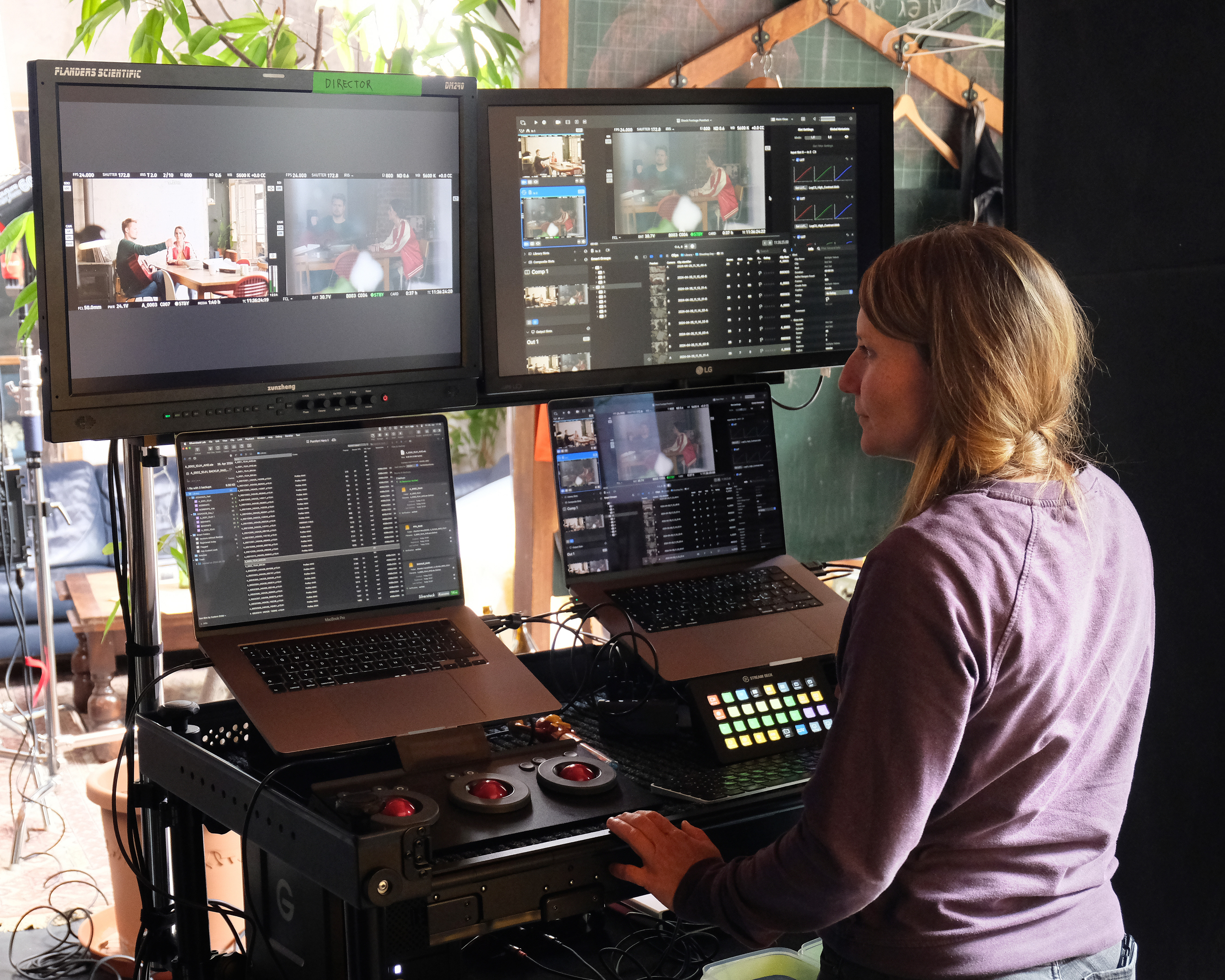
A DIT with her DIT cart

A digital imaging technician (DIT) was created for the motion picture industry in response to the transition from the long established film movie camera medium into the current digital cinema era. The DIT is the camera department crew member who works in collaboration with the cinematographer on workflow, systemization, camera settings, signal integrity and image manipulation to achieve the highest image quality and creative goals of cinematography in the digital realm.

With the progression of the digitization ever more tasks concerning data management emerged: the position of the Digital Imaging Technician was introduced. The DIT is the connector between on-set time and post production. DITs support the camera team with technical and creative tasks with the digital camera. Their purpose is to ensure the best technical quality possible, as well as production safety. DITs are responsible for tasks during preparation, on-set time and post production. They are also responsible for managing data on set, such as making backups and quality checks of the material. In post production, the DIT hands the recordings to the post production team, possibly after checking the quality of the material and generating working copies.

Data backups and quality control are of great significance for the DIT who has to make sure that the original camera data and metadata is backed up at least twice daily, ensuring data integrity with checksum verification. Furthermore, the data may be backed up on LTO tape which is hardier than electronic devices and is used for long-term storage. Another copy must be made on a transfer data carrier that will be sent to post production along with the reports of the content. Again, the data has to be backed up. The data has to be accessible at all times and should be saved in a system where it can be reviewed, displaying the metadata of each clip.

The DIT's role on-set has become especially prevalent through assisting cinematographers, normally accustomed to film stock, in achieving their desired look digitally. This is accomplished by the DIT through monitoring picture exposure, setting up Color Decision List (CDL) on daily basis and, if requested, "look up tables" (LUTs) for the post-production. Additionally, the DIT handles any settings in the digital camera's menu system, such as recording format and outputs. As a courtesy, the DIT also secures the digital audio recorded by the external digital audio recorder operated by the Production Sound Mixer.

== Related positions ==
Alongside the digital imaging technician, the digital loader position has also been created. Digital loaders may be independent or work under a digital imaging technician. A data wrangler is another common term for the role of digital loader. A digital loader supports the camera department by managing, transferring and securing all the digital data acquired on-set via any digital cinematography cameras, interacting with the 2nd AC. Depending on the scale of the project, the DIT can also wrangle data, but never the opposite. In tradition with the classic role of film loader, the 2nd AC may alternatively take on the responsibility of digital loading as an additional duty.

A digital loader may also be called a loader, DMT (Data Management Technician), data wrangler or film loader. Loaders usually, however, have responsibilities in addition to data wrangling, like maintaining the camera truck and completing paperwork for the camera crew. Traditional film loaders also continue to be employed on film productions where the skills of a DIT aren't applicable.

Prior to the DIT position and its focus on on-set image work, several other positions, including video controllers, video shaders and video engineers performed similar functions of exposure and color control on a live video feed. While video positions still exist (especially in live broadcast and studio television), the DIT position has become commonplace in cinema, commercials and digital television.
