= Luke Hemsworth =

Australian actor (born 1980)

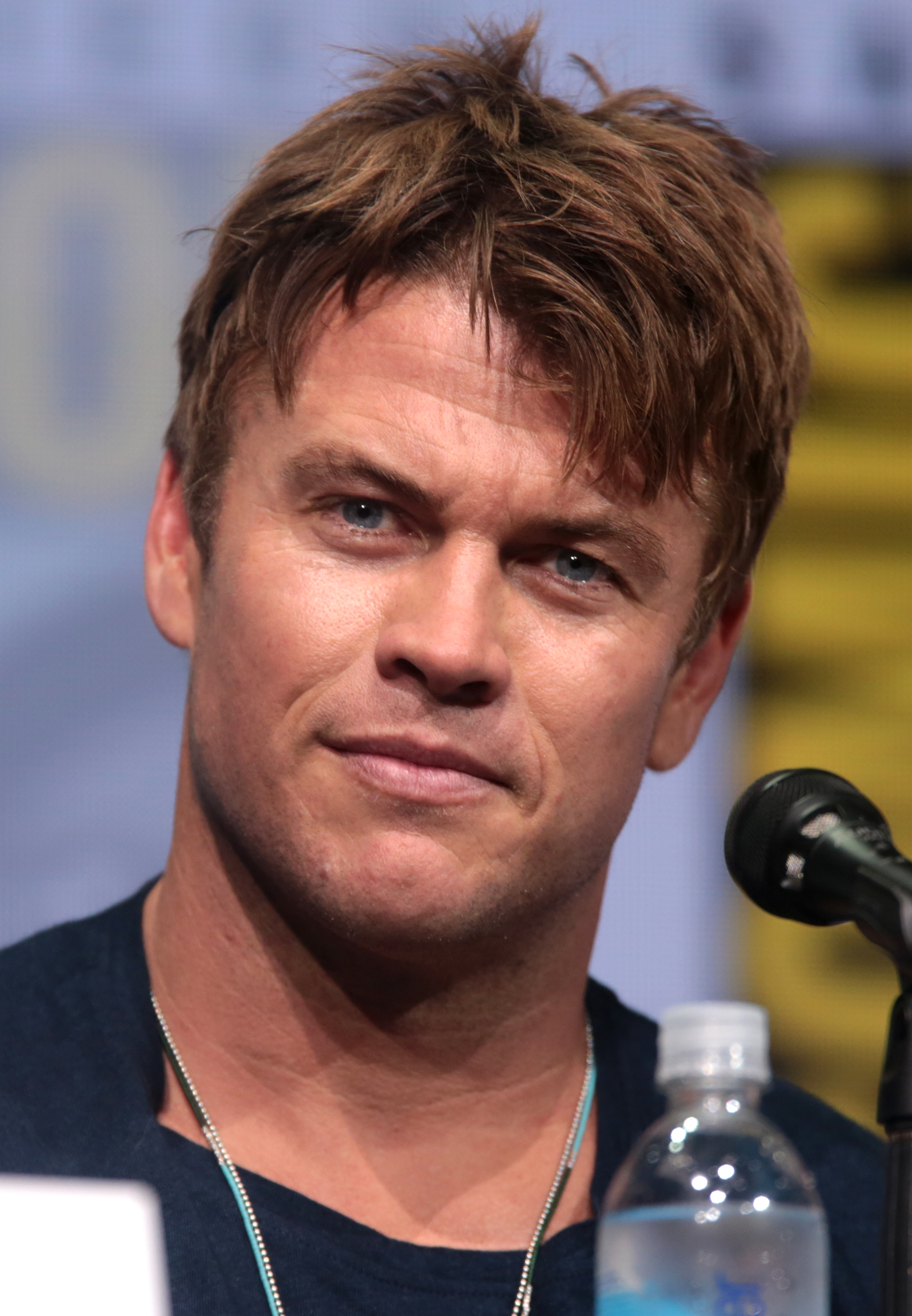
- Hemsworth at the 2017 San Diego Comic-Con
- Born: 5 November 1980 (age 46); Melbourne, Victoria, Australia
- Education: National Institute of Dramatic Art
- Occupation: Actor
- Years active: 2001–present
- Relatives: Chris Hemsworth (brother); Liam Hemsworth (brother)

Luke Hemsworth (born 5 November 1980) is an Australian actor. He is known for his roles as Nathan Tyson in the TV series Neighbours and as Ashley Stubbs in the HBO sci-fi series Westworld. His latest role is as Jason Wade in series 2 of the comedy crime series Deadloch (March 2026). He is the older brother of actors Chris Hemsworth and Liam Hemsworth.

== Early life and education ==
Luke Hemsworth was born on 5 November 1980 in Melbourne, the eldest son of Leonie (née van Os), an author, and Craig Hemsworth, a social services counsellor. His younger brothers are actors Chris and Liam. His maternal grandfather is a Dutch immigrant and his other ancestries are Irish, German, Scottish, and English.

Hemsworth trained in acting at the National Institute of Dramatic Art in Sydney.

== Career ==
In 2001, Hemsworth started his career on the Australian soap opera Neighbours as Nathan Tyson. Mainly a television actor, Hemsworth has appeared in TV series such as The Saddle Club, Blue Heelers, Last Man Standing, All Saints, Satisfaction, and Westworld. In 2012, he starred in the six-part miniseries Bikie Wars: Brothers in Arms as Gregory "Shadow" Campbell.

In 2018, Hemsworth was selected as the newest face of Tourism Australia, and appeared in a "Crocodile Dundee" ad.

He played the character Caleb Duran in the 2019 film Crypto, which follows the life of a family that gets embroiled in a crypto conspiracy involving Russian mafia.

On 5 November 2024, Hemsworth was announced for the second series of Amazon Prime Video comedy crime series Deadloch in the role of Jason Wade. The series was released on 20 March 2026.

== Filmography ==
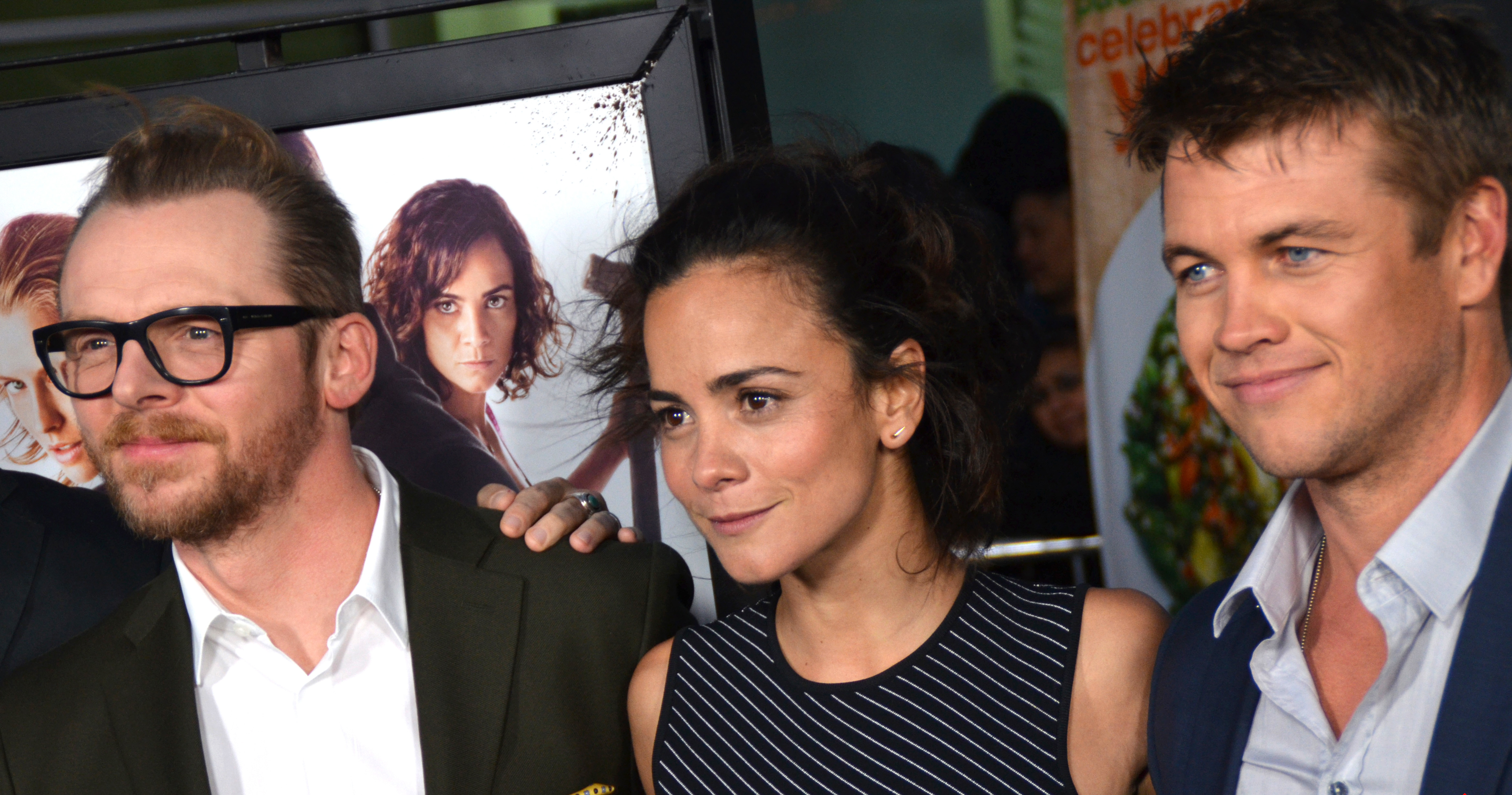
Hemsworth with co-stars Simon Pegg and Alice Braga at the Kill Me Three Times premier in March 2015

=== Film ===
Year	Title	Role	Notes
2014	The Reckoning	Detective Jason Pearson	
2014	The Anomaly	Agent Richard Elkin	
2014	Kill Me Three Times	Dylan Smith	
2015	Infini	Charlie Kent	
2016	Science Fiction Volume One: The Osiris Child	Travek	
2017	Hickok	Wild Bill Hickok	
2017	Thor: Ragnarok	Thor actor	Cameo
2018	We Are Boats	Lucas	
2018	River Runs Red	Von	
2018	Encounter	Will Fleming	
2019	Crypto	Caleb	
2020	Death of Me	Neil	
2020	The Very Excellent Mr. Dundee	Himself (cameo)	
2021	Asking for It	Vernon	
2022	Thor: Love and Thunder	Thor actor	Cameo
2022	Bosch & Rockit	Bosch	
2023	Next Goal Wins	Keith	
2023	Bad Hombres	Donnie	also executive producer
2024	Land of Bad	Sergeant Abel	also executive producer
2024	Gunner	Lee Gunner	
2026	Beast	Gabriel Stone	
2026	Ithaqua		

=== Television ===
Year	Title	Role	Notes
2001–2002	Neighbours	Nathan Tyson	10 episodes
2003	The Saddle Club	Simon	Episode: "Foster Horse: Part 1"
2004	Blue Heelers	Glen Peters	2 episodes
2005	Last Man Standing	Shannon Gazal	3 episodes
2005	All Saints	Ben Simpson	Episode: "Out of Darkness"
2007	Satisfaction	Paul the Butcher	Episode: "Lauren Rising"
2008	Neighbours	John Carter	3 episodes
2008	The Elephant Princess	Uncle Harry	Episode: "The Big Gig"
2009	Carla Cametti PD	Electrician	Episode: "Love, Honour and Cherish"
2009	Tangle	John	2 episodes
2011	The Bazura Project	Villain	Episode: "Money"
2012	Bikie Wars: Brothers in Arms	Gregory "Shadow" Campbell	Miniseries
2012	Winners & Losers	Jackson Norton	2 episodes
2016–2022	Westworld	Ashley Stubbs	Main role
2021	Young Rock	Coach Erickson	2 episodes
2025	The Terminal List: Dark Wolf	Jules Landry	Recurring role
2026	Deadloch	Jason Wade	Recurring role
2026	The Terminal List	Jules Landry	Recurring role (season 2)
