= List of science fiction films of the 2010s =

This is a list of science fiction films release in the 2010s. These films include core elements of science fiction, but can cross into other genres. They have been released to a cinema audience by the commercial film industry and are widely distributed with reviews by reputable critics.

== List ==
2010
Title	Director	Cast	Country	Subgenre/Notes
Alien vs Ninja	Seiji Chiba	Shuuji Kashiwabara, Ben Hiura	Japan	Action
Beyond the Black Rainbow	Panos Cosmatos	Michael Rogers, Eva Allan	Canada	Mystery thriller
The Book of Eli	Albert Hughes, Allen Hughes	Denzel Washington, Gary Oldman, Mila Kunis	United States	Post-apocalyptic
Daybreakers	Peter Spierig, Michael Spierig	Ethan Hawke, Willem Dafoe, Sam Neill	United States	Vampire thriller
Denizen	J.A. Steel	J.A. Steel, Julie Corgill, Glen Jensen, Ben Bayless	United States	Action horror
Despicable Me	Chris Renaud, Pierre Coffin	Steve Carell (voice), Jason Segel (voice), Russell Brand (voice), Kristen Wiig (voice), Miranda Cosgrove (voice)	United States	Comedy Animation Family
The Disappearance of Haruhi Suzumiya	Tatsuya Ishihara, Yasuhiro Takemoto	Aya Hirano (voice), Tomokazu Sugita (voice), Minori Chihara (voice), Yūko Gotō (voice)	Japan	Anime drama
Downstream	Simone Bartesaghi, Philip Kim	Jonathon Trent, Jono Roberts	United States	Post-apocalyptic action
Enthiran	S. Shankar	Rajinikanth, Aishwarya Rai Bachchan	India	Robot Uprising
Future X-Cops	Wong Jing	Andy Lau, Xu Jiao, Barbie Hsu	China; Hong Kong; Taiwan	Time travel
Growth	Gabriel Cowan	Mircea Monroe	United States	Horror
Hot Tub Time Machine	Sean Anders, John Morris	Rob Corddry, John Cusack	United States	Comedy
Hunter Prey	Sandy Collora	Clark Bartram, Damion Poitier, Isaac C. Singleton Jr.	United States	Thriller
Inception	Christopher Nolan	Leonardo DiCaprio, Ken Watanabe, Joseph Gordon-Levitt	United Kingdom; United States	Action thriller (Note: Awarded Best Production Design, Best Special Visual Effects and Best Sound at the 64th British Academy Film Awards. It was nominated for Best Film, Best Cinematography, Best Director, Best Editing, Best Music and Best Original Screenplay. At the 83rd Academy Awards, Inception received Oscars for Best Cinematography, Best Sound Editing, Best Sound Mixing and Best Visual Effects. It was nominated for Best Art Direction, Best Music (Original Score), Best Picture and Best Writing (Original Screenplay). At the 37th Annual Saturn Awards, Inception received awards for Best Science Fiction Film, Best Director, Best Writer, Best Music, and Best Special Effects. It was nominated for Best Actor, Best Actress, Best Supporting Actor, and Best Production Design.)
Iron Man 2	Jon Favreau	Robert Downey Jr., Gwyneth Paltrow, Don Cheadle	United States	Superhero
Justice League: Crisis on Two Earths	Lauren Montgomery, Sam Liu	William Baldwin, Mark Harmon, Chris Noth	United States	Animated superhero film
The Jensen Project	Douglas Barr	Justin Kelly, Kelli Martin, Brady Smith	Canada, United States	Action Adventure
Kaboom	Gregg Araki	Thomas Dekker, Juno Temple, Haley Bennett	France; United States	Comedy mystery
The King of Fighters	Gordon Chan	Maggie Q, Sean Faris, Ray Park, David Leitch	Germany; Japan; Taiwan; United States	Martial Art Science Fiction
Die kommenden Tage	Lars Kraume	Bernadette Heerwagen, Johanna Wokalek, Daniel Brühl, August Diehl	Germany	Near-future drama
Mardock Scramble: The First Compression	Susumu Kudo	Megumi Hayashibara, Norito Yashima, Hiroki Touchi, Kazuya Nakai (all voice)	Japan	Drama Animation Action Thriller
Megamind	Tom McGrath	Will Ferrell (voice), Brad Pitt (voice), Tina Fey (voice), David Cross (voice)	United States	Family-oriented action comedy
Monsters	Gareth Edwards	Scoot McNairy, Whitney Able	United Kingdom	Romantic drama
Mutant Girls Squad	Noboru Iguchi, Yoshihiro Nishimura, Tak Sakaguchi	Yumi Sugimoto, Yuko Takayama, Suzuka Morita	Japan	Action
Never Let Me Go	Mark Romanek	Keira Knightley, Carey Mulligan, Ella Purnell, Andrew Garfield	United Kingdom	Dystopian, romantic drama
Planet Hulk	Sam Liu, Frank Paur	Rick D. Wasserman, Lisa Ann Beley, Mark Hildreth, Liam O'Brien (all voice)	United States	Fantasy Animation Action
Predators	Nimród Antal	Adrien Brody, Topher Grace, Laurence Fishburne	United States	Horror
Repo Men	Miguel Sapochnik	Jude Law, Liev Schreiber, Forest Whitaker	United States	Action thriller
Resident Evil: Afterlife	Paul W. S. Anderson	Milla Jovovich, Ali Larter, Spencer Locke	Germany; United Kingdom; United States	Action horror
Skyline	Colin Strause, Greg Strause	Donald Faison, Eric Balfour, Scottie Thompson	United States	Alien invasion thriller
Space Battleship Yamato	Takashi Yamazaki	Takuya Kimura, Koyuki, Hiroyuki Ikeuchi, Naoto Takenaka	Japan	Action adventure (Note: Released theatrically in Japan on December 1.)
Superman/Batman: Apocalypse	Lauren Montgomery	Andre Braugher, Kevin Conroy, Tim Daly, Summer Glau, (all voice)	United States	Adventure Action Animation
Tron: Legacy	Joseph Kosinski	Jeff Bridges, Garrett Hedlund, Olivia Wilde, Bruce Boxleitner, Michael Sheen	United States	Action adventure
Universal Soldier: Regeneration	John Hyams	Jean-Claude Van Damme, Dolph Lundgren	United States	Action (Note: Only released theatrically in the Middle East and Southeast Asia.)
Womb	Benedek Fliegauf	Eva Green, Matt Smith	Germany	Romantic drama
2011
Title	Director	Cast	Country	Subgenre/Notes
51	Jason Connery	Bruce Boxleitner, John Shea	United States	Horror Thriller
7 Aum Arivu	A. R. Murugadoss	Surya Sivakumar, Shruti Haasan	India	Action Thriller
The Adjustment Bureau	George Nolfi	Matt Damon, Emily Blunt	United States	Romance Thriller
All-Star Superman	Sam Liu	James Denton, Christina Hendricks, Anthony LaPaglia	United States	Animation Action Adventure
All Superheroes Must Die	Jason Trost	Jason Trost, Lucas Till, James Remar	United States	Superhero Action Horror Thriller
Another Earth	Mike Cahill	William Mapother, Brit Marling	United States	Drama Romance
Apollo 18	Gonzalo López-Gallego	Lloyd Owen, Warren Christie	United States	Horror Mystery Thriller
Area Q	Gerson Sanginitto	Isaiah Washington, Murilo Rosa, Tania Khalill	Brazil; United States	Thriller
Atlas Shrugged: Part I	Paul Johansson	Taylor Schilling, Grant Bowler	United States	Drama Mystery
Attack the Block	Joe Cornish	John Boyega, Nick Frost, Jodie Whittaker, Luke Treadaway	United Kingdom	Action Adventure Comedy Thriller
Battle: Los Angeles	Jonathan Liebesman	Aaron Eckhart, Michelle Rodriguez, Michael Peña, Bridget Moynahan	United States	Action Adventure
Captain America: The First Avenger	Joe Johnston	Chris Evans, Hugo Weaving, Samuel L. Jackson	United States	Superhero Action Adventure
Cowboys & Aliens	Jon Favreau	Daniel Craig, Olivia Wilde, Harrison Ford, Sam Rockwell	United States	Action Drama Thriller Western
The Darkest Hour	Chris Gorak	Olivia Thirlby, Emile Hirsch	United States	Action Adventure Horror Thriller
The Day	Douglas Aarniokoski	Ashley Bell, Shannyn Sossamon, Dominic Monaghan, Shawn Ashmore	Canada	Action Drama Horror Thriller
Dear God No!	James Bickert	Jett Bryant, Madeline Brumby, Paul McComiskey	United States	Horror
Eva	Kike Maíllo	Daniel Brühl, Marta Etura, Alberto Ammann	Spain	Adventure Drama Fantasy Romance
Extraterrestrial	Nacho Vigalondo	Michelle Jenner, Carlos Areces, Julián Villagrán, Raúl Cimas	Spain	Comedy Drama
Gantz	Shinsuke Sato	Kazunari Ninomiya, Ken'ichi Matsuyama	Japan	Action Adventure Drama Horror Mystery
Gantz: Perfect Answer	Shinsuke Sato	Kazunari Ninomiya, Ken'ichi Matsuyama	Japan	Action Adventure Drama Horror Mystery
Green Lantern	Martin Campbell	Ryan Reynolds, Blake Lively, Peter Sarsgaard, Mark Strong	United States	Superhero Action Adventure
Green Lantern: Emerald Knights	Christopher Berkeley	Nathan Fillion, Elisabeth Moss, Jason Isaacs	United States	Superhero Animation Action Adventure
Hell	Tim Fehlbaum	Hannah Herzsprung, Lars Eidinger, Stipe Erceg	Germany; Switzerland	Horror Thriller
Hellacious Acres: The Case of John Glass	Pat Tremblay	Navin Pratap, Jamie Abrams, Paula Davis	Canada	Comedy
I Am Number Four	D. J. Caruso	Timothy Olyphant, Alex Pettyfer, Teresa Palmer, Dianna Agron	United States	Action Adventure Thriller
In Time	Andrew Niccol	Justin Timberlake, Amanda Seyfried, Olivia Wilde, Cillian Murphy	United States	Action Thriller
Limitless	Neil Burger	Bradley Cooper, Abbie Cornish, Robert De Niro	United States	Thriller
Love	William Eubank	Gunner Wright	United States	Drama Music
Manborg	Steven Kostanski	Matthew Kennedy, Adam Brooks, Meredith Sweeney	Canada	Action
The Man from the Future (a.k.a O Homem do Futuro)	Cláudio Torres	Wagner Moura, Alinne Moraes	Brazil	Comedy Fantasy Romance
Mardock Scramble: The Second Combustion (a.k.a Marudukku sukuranburu: Nenshou)	Susumu Kudo	Leraldo Anzaldua, Chris Ayres, Luci Christian, Justin Doran	Japan	Anime film
Mars Needs Moms	Simon Wells	Seth Green (voice), Joan Cusack (voice), Elisabeth Harnois (voice)	United States	Animation Action Adventure Family
Melancholia	Lars von Trier	Kirsten Dunst, Kiefer Sutherland	Denmark	Drama
Paul	Greg Mottola	Simon Pegg, Nick Frost, Seth Rogen, Kristen Wiig	United Kingdom; United States	Adventure Comedy
Phase 7	Nicolás Goldbart	Daniel Hendler, Jazmín Stuart, Federico Luppi	Argentina	Comedy Thriller
The Prodigies	Antoine Charreyron	Jeffrey Evan Thomas (voice), Lauren Ashley Carter (voice), Moon Dailly (voice)	France	Animation Action Drama Fantasy Horror Thriller
Ra.One	Anubhav Sinha	Shah Rukh Khan, Arjun Rampal, Kareena Kapoor	India	Superhero Action Adventure
Real Steel	Shawn Levy	Hugh Jackman, Evangeline Lilly	United States	Action Drama Sport
Rise of the Planet of the Apes	Rupert Wyatt	James Franco, Freida Pinto, John Lithgow, Andy Serkis	United States	Action Drama Thriller
Source Code	Duncan Jones	Jake Gyllenhaal, Vera Farmiga, Michelle Monaghan, Jeffrey Wright	France; United States	Action Drama Mystery Thriller
Super 8	J. J. Abrams	Joel Courtney, Elle Fanning, Kyle Chandler	Canada; United States	Action Mystery Thriller
The Thing	Matthijs van Heijningen Jr.	Mary Elizabeth Winstead, Joel Edgerton	United States	Horror Mystery
Transformers: Dark of the Moon	Michael Bay	Shia LaBeouf, Rosie Huntington-Whiteley, Josh Duhamel, Tyrese Gibson	United States	Action Adventure
X-Men: First Class	Matthew Vaughn	James McAvoy, Michael Fassbender, Jennifer Lawrence	United States; United Kingdom	Superhero Action
2012
Title	Director	Cast	Country	Subgenre/Notes
009 Re:Cyborg	Kenji Kamiyama	Chiwa Saitô, Daisuke Ono, Hiroyuki Yoshino, Mamoru Miyano	Japan	Animation Action
Alien Origin	Mark Atkins	Chelsea Vincent, Peter Pedrero, Philip Coc, Trey McCurley, Daniela Flynn	United States	Action Adventure Horror Mystery Thriller
The Amazing Spider-Man	Marc Webb	Andrew Garfield, Emma Stone, Rhys Ifans	United States	Superhero Action Adventure
The Avengers	Joss Whedon	Robert Downey Jr., Chris Evans, Scarlett Johansson	United States	Superhero Action (Note: At the 39th Annual Saturn Awards, The Avengers received awards for Best Science Fiction Film, Best Director, Best Supporting Actor, and Best Special Effects. It was nominated for Best Writing and Best Editing.)
Battleship	Peter Berg	Taylor Kitsch, Alexander Skarsgård, Liam Neeson	United States	Action Adventure
Branded	Jamie Bradshaw, Alexander Doulerain	Ed Stoppard, Leelee Sobieski, Jeffrey Tambor, Max von Sydow	Russia; United States	Drama Fantasy Thriller
Chronicle	Josh Trank	Michael B. Jordan, Dane DeHaan, Michael Kelly, Alex Russell	United States	Action Drama Thriller
CLONED: The Recreator Chronicles	Gregory Orr	Stella Maeve, J. Mallory McCree, John de Lancie, Laura Moss	United States	
Cloud Atlas	Tom Tykwer, The Wachowskis	Tom Hanks, Halle Berry, Hugh Grant, Susan Sarandon	Germany; United States	Drama Mystery Thriller (Note: Saturn Awards for Best Editing and Best Make-up)
Dredd	Pete Travis	Karl Urban, Olivia Thirlby, Lena Headey	United Kingdom; United States	Action Crime
The Divide	Xavier Gens	Lauren German, Michael Biehn, Milo Ventimiglia, Rosanna Arquette	Canada; Germany; United States	Drama Horror Thriller
Grabbers	Jon Wright	Richard Coyle, Ruth Bradley, Russell Tovey	Ireland	Action Adventure Comedy Horror Thriller
The Hunger Games	Gary Ross	Jennifer Lawrence, Josh Hutcherson, Liam Hemsworth	United States	Action Adventure Thriller (Note: Won a Saturn Award for Best Actress)
Iron Sky	Timo Vuorensola	Julia Dietze, Götz Otto, Christopher Kirby, Udo Kier	Australia; Finland; Germany	Action Adventure Comedy
John Carter	Andrew Stanton	Taylor Kitsch, Lynn Collins, Willem Dafoe	United States	Action adventure
Justice League: Doom	Lauren Montgomery	Kevin Conroy, Tim Daly, Nathan Fillion	United States	Animation Action Superhero
Lockout	James Mather, Stephen St. Leger	Guy Pearce, Maggie Grace, Peter Stormare	France	Action Thriller
Looper	Rian Johnson	Bruce Willis, Joseph Gordon-Levitt, Emily Blunt	United States	Action Drama Thriller
Mardock Scramble: The Third Exhaust (a.k.a Marudukku sukuranburu: Haiki)	Susumu Kudo	Leraldo Anzaldua, Chris Ayres, Shelley Calene-Black, Toshiko Fujita	Japan	Animation Action Drama Thriller
Mars et Avril	Martin Villeneuve	Jacques Languirand, Caroline Dhavernas, Paul Ahmarani, Robert Lepage	Canada	Drama Fantasy
Men in Black 3	Barry Sonnenfeld	Will Smith, Tommy Lee Jones, Josh Brolin, Alice Eve	United States	Action Adventure Comedy
Prometheus	Ridley Scott	Noomi Rapace, Charlize Theron, Michael Fassbender, Guy Pearce, Idris Elba	United States; United Kingdom	Adventure Mystery
Resident Evil: Damnation	Makoto Kamiya	Matthew Mercer, Dave Wittenberg, Wendee Lee, Courtenay Taylor	Japan	Animation Action Horror Thriller
Resident Evil: Retribution	Paul W. S. Anderson	Milla Jovovich, Sienna Guillory, Michelle Rodriguez	France; United States	Action Horror Thriller
Robot & Frank	Jake Schreier	Frank Langella, James Marsden, Peter Sarsgaard, Susan Sarandon	United States	Comedy Crime Drama
Seeking a Friend for the End of the World	Lorene Scafaria	Steve Carell, Keira Knightley	United States	Adventure Comedy Drama Romance
Strange Frame	GB Hajim	Claudia Black (voice), Tim Curry (voice)	United States	Animation Crime Music Romance
Starship Troopers: Invasion	Shinji Aramaki	Luci Christian, David Matranga, Justin Doran, David Wald	Japan; United States	Animation Action
Storage 24	Johannes Roberts	Noel Clarke, Antonia Campbell-Hughes, Laura Haddock, Colin O'Donoghue	United Kingdom	Horror
Superman vs. The Elite	Michael Chang	George Newbern, Pauley Perrette, Robin Atkin Downes	United States	Superhero Animation Action
Total Recall	Len Wiseman	Colin Farrell, Kate Beckinsale, Jessica Biel, Bryan Cranston	United States	Action Adventure Thriller
Upside Down	Juan Diego Solanas	Jim Sturgess, Kirsten Dunst	Canada; France	Drama Fantasy Romance
V/H/S	Adam Wingard, David Bruckner, Ti West	Calvin Reader, Lane Hughes, Kentucker Audley	United States	Horror
The Watch	Akiva Schaffer	Ben Stiller, Vince Vaughn, Jonah Hill, Richard Ayoade	United States	Comedy
2013
Title	Director	Cast	Country	Subgenre/Notes
After Earth	M. Night Shyamalan	Will Smith, Jaden Smith	United States	Action adventure
The A.R.K. Report	Shmuel Hoffman	Katy Castaldi, Pascal Yen-Pfister, Ayden Crispe	Israel; United States	Short
Army of Frankensteins	Ryan Bellgardt	Jordan Farris, Christian Bellgardt, Rett Terrell	United States	Adventure Horror
Collider	Jason Butler	Iain Robertson	Ireland, Portugal	Apocalyptic fiction, time travel
The Colony	Jeff Renfroe	Laurence Fishburne, Bill Paxton, Kevin Zegers	Canada	Action Horror Thriller
The Congress	Ari Folman	Robin Wright (voice), Harvey Keitel (voice), Jon Hamm (voice), Paul Giamatti (voice)	Israel; Germany; Poland; Luxembourg; Belgium	Animation Drama
The Cosmonaut	Nicolás Alcalá	Katrine De Candole, Leon Ockenden, David Barrass	Spain	Drama Romance
Dark Skies	Scott Stewart	Keri Russell, Josh Hamilton	United States	Horror Thriller
Despicable Me 2	Pierre Coffin, Chris Renaud	Steve Carell (voice), Kristen Wiig (voice), Benjamin Bratt (voice), Miranda Cosgrove (voice)	United States	Animation Adventure Comedy Crime Family
Elysium	Neill Blomkamp	Matt Damon, Jodie Foster, Wagner Moura, Alice Braga	United States	Action Drama Thriller
Escape from Planet Earth	Cal Brunker	Brendan Fraser (voice), Jessica Alba (voice), Rob Corddry (voice), Sarah Jessica Parker (voice)	United States	Animation Adventure Comedy Family
Europa Report	Sebastián Cordero	Sharlto Copley, Michael Nyqvist, Daniel Wu	United States	Adventure Drama Mystery Thriller
Ender's Game	Gavin Hood	Asa Butterfield, Abigail Breslin, Harrison Ford	United States	Action Adventure
Frankenstein's Army	Richard Raaphorst	Karel Roden, Joshua Sasse, Robert Gwilym	Netherlands	Horror
The Frankenstein Theory	Andrew Weiner	Joe Egender, Haydyn Foster, Brian Henderson, Luke Geissbuhler	United States	Horror
Frequencies (a.k.a OXV: The Manual)	Darren Paul Fisher	Daniel Fraser, Eleanor Wyld, Owen Pugh	United Kingdom	Mystery Romance
Gatchaman	Tōya Satō	Tori Matsuzaka, Gō Ayano, Ayame Goriki	Japan	Action Drama
Ghost in the Shell: Arise - Border 1: Ghost Pain	Masahiko Murata, Kazuchika Kise	Maaya Sakamoto (voice), Ikkyû Jaku (voice), Ken'ichirô Matsuda (voice), Tarusuke Shingaki (voice)	Japan	Action Animation
Ghost in the Shell: Arise - Border 2: Ghost Whispers	Masahiko Murata, Kazuchika Kise	Maaya Sakamoto (voice), Ikkyû Jaku (voice), Ken'ichirô Matsuda (voice), Tarusuke Shingaki (voice)	Japan	Action Animation
G.I. Joe: Retaliation	Jon M. Chu	Dwayne Johnson, Channing Tatum, Lee Byung-hun, D. J. Cotrona, Adrianne Palicki, Bruce Willis	United States	Action Adventure Thriller
Gravity	Alfonso Cuarón	Sandra Bullock, George Clooney	United Kingdom; United States	Drama Thriller
Hard to Be a God	Aleksey German	Leonid Yarmolnik, Dmitriy Vladimirov, Laura Lauri, Aleksandr Ilin	Russia	Drama
Her	Spike Jonze	Joaquin Phoenix, Scarlett Johansson	United States	Drama Romance
HK: Forbidden Super Hero	Yūichi Fukuda	Ryohei Suzuki, Fumika Shimizu, Tsuyoshi Muro, Ken Yasuda	Japan	Superhero
The Hunger Games: Catching Fire	Francis Lawrence	Jennifer Lawrence, Josh Hutcherson, Liam Hemsworth	United States	Action Adventure Thriller
The Host	Andrew Niccol	Saoirse Ronan, Diane Kruger, William Hurt	United States	Action Adventure Drama Romance Thriller
Iron Man 3	Shane Black	Robert Downey Jr., Gwyneth Paltrow, Don Cheadle, Guy Pearce, Ben Kingsley	United States	Action Adventure
Iron Man & Hulk Heroes United	Eric Radomski, Leo Riley	Adrian Pasdar (voice), Fred Tatasciore (voice), Dee Bradley Baker (voice), Robin Atkin Downes (voice)	United States	Adventure Animation Family Action
Justice League: The Flashpoint Paradox	Jay Oliva	Justin Chambers, C. Thomas Howell, Michael B. Jordan	United States	Animation Action Adventure
Krrish 3	Rakesh Roshan	Hrithik Roshan, Vivek Oberoi, Priyanka	India	Action Adventure
The Last Days (a.k.a Los últimos días)	David Pastor, Àlex Pastor	Quim Gutiérrez, José Coronado, Marta Etura	Spain; France	Action Adventure Fantasy Horror Thriller
The Last Days on Mars	Ruairí Robinson	Liev Schreiber, Romola Garai, Elias Koteas	Ireland; United Kingdom	Adventure Horror Thriller
The Machine	Caradog W. James	Caity Lotz, Toby Stephens	United Kingdom	Action Drama Thriller
Man of Steel	Zack Snyder	Henry Cavill, Amy Adams, Michael Shannon	United States; United Kingdom	Action Adventure
Oblivion	Joseph Kosinski	Tom Cruise, Andrea Riseborough, Olga Kurylenko, Morgan Freeman	United States	Action Adventure
Pacific Rim	Guillermo del Toro	Idris Elba, Charlie Day, Charlie Hunnam, Ron Perlman	United States	Action Adventure
The Purge	James DeMonaco	Lena Headey, Ethan Hawke	United States	Horror Thriller
Riddick	David Twohy	Vin Diesel, Katee Sackhoff, Karl Urban	United States	Action Adventure Thriller
Snowpiercer	Bong Joon-ho	Chris Evans, Song Kang-ho, Jamie Bell, Tilda Swinton, John Hurt, Ed Harris	South Korea; United States; France	Action Drama Thriller
Harlock: Space Pirate	Shinji Aramaki	Miime (voice), Kei Yuki, Tori-san (voice), Yattaran (voice)	Japan	computer-animated
Star Trek Into Darkness	J. J. Abrams	Chris Pine, Benedict Cumberbatch, Zachary Quinto, Zoe Saldaña, Karl Urban, Simon Pegg, Alice Eve	United States	Action Adventure
Superman Unbound	James Tuker	Matt Bomer, Stana Katic, John Noble	United States	Animation Action Adventure
Upstream Color	Shane Carruth	Amy Seimetz, Shane Carruth	United States	Drama
The Wolverine	James Mangold	Hugh Jackman, Rila Fukushima	United Kingdom; United States	Action
World War Z	Marc Forster	Brad Pitt, Mireille Enos, James Badge Dale	United Kingdom; United States	Action Adventure Horror
The World's End	Edgar Wright	Simon Pegg, Nick Frost, Martin Freeman	United Kingdom	Action Comedy
The Zero Theorem	Terry Gilliam	Christoph Waltz, Mélanie Thierry	United Kingdom; Romania; France	Comedy Drama Fantasy Mystery
2014
Title	Director	Cast	Country	Subgenre/Notes
The Amazing Spider-Man 2	Marc Webb	Andrew Garfield, Emma Stone, Jamie Foxx	United States	Action Adventure
Android Cop	Mark Atkins	Michael Jai White, Charles S. Dutton, Randy Wayne	United States	Action Adventure Crime Fantasy Thriller
The Anomaly	Noel Clarke	Noel Clarke, Ian Somerhalder, Brian Cox	United Kingdom	Action Mystery Thriller
Armor Hero Atlas	Zheng Guowei	Xu Feng, Cao Xiyue, Kenny Zeng	China	Animation
Autómata	Gabe Ibáñez	Antonio Banderas, Melanie Griffith, Dylan McDermott	Spain; United States	Action Drama Thriller
Beyond	Joseph Baker and Tom Large	Richard J. Danum, Gillian MacGregor, Paul Brannigan	United Kingdom	Drama Romance
Big Hero 6	Don Hall	Ryan Potter (voice), Scott Adsit (voice), Jamie Chung (voice), Damon Wayans Jr. (voice)	United States	Animation Action Adventure Comedy Family
Bodacious Space Pirates: Abyss of Hyperspace	Tatsuo Satō	Mikako Komatsu, Asami Shimoda, Kana Hanazawa, Haruka Tomatsu	Japan	Animation Adventure Comedy
Bugs (a.k.a Shi ren chong)	Yan Jia	Xia Zitong, Zhang Zilin, Eric Wang	China	Disaster Thriller
The Calculator (a.k.a Vychislitel)	Dmitriy Grachev	Evgeniy Mironov, Vinnie Jones	Russia	Action Thriller
Captain America: The Winter Soldier	Russo brothers	Chris Evans, Scarlett Johansson, Anthony Mackie, Emily VanCamp	United States	Action Adventure Thriller Superhero
Christmas Icetastrophe	Jonathan Winfrey	Victor Webster, Jennifer Spence, Richard Harmon	United States	Television film
Cloudy with a Chance of Meatballs 2	Cody Cameron, Kris Pearn	Bill Hader, Anna Faris	United States	Animated comedy
Coherence	James Ward Byrkit	Emily Baldoni, Maury Sterling, Nicholas Brendon	United States	Drama Mystery Thriller
Dawn of the Planet of the Apes	Matt Reeves	Jason Clarke, Kodi Smit-McPhee, Andy Serkis	United States	Action Adventure Drama Thriller
The Device	Jeremy Berg	Kate Alden, Angela DiMarco, Lorraine Montez	United States	Action Adventure Horror Thriller
Divergent	Neil Burger	Shailene Woodley, Theo James, Ansel Elgort	United States	Action Adventure Mystery
Earth to Echo	Dave Green	Teo Halm, Brian "Astro" Bradley, Reese C. Hartwig, Ella Wahlestedt	United States	Adventure Family
Edge of Tomorrow	Doug Liman	Tom Cruise, Emily Blunt, Bill Paxton	Australia; United States	Action Adventure War
Ejecta	Chad Archibald, Matt Wiele	Lisa Houle, Julian Richings, Adam Seybold	Canada	Horror
Extraterrestrial	Colin Minihan	Brittany Allen, Melanie Papalia, Jesse Moss, Anja Savcic	Canada	Horror
Expelled from Paradise	Seiji Mizushima	Rie Kugimiya (voice), Shin-ichiro Miki (voice), Hiroshi Kamiya (voice)	Japan	Animation Action Adventure
Ghost in the Shell Arise Border 3 : Ghost Tears	Kazuchika Kise	Maaya Sakamoto (voice), Ikkyû Jaku (voice), Ken'ichirô Matsuda (voice), Tarusuke Shingaki (voice)	Japan	Action Animation
Ghost in the Shell Arise Border 4 Ghost : Stands Alone	Kazuchika Kise	Maaya Sakamoto (voice), Ikkyû Jaku (voice), Ken'ichirô Matsuda (voice), Tarusuke Shingaki (voice)	Japan	Action Animation
The Giver	Phillip Noyce	Brenton Thwaites, Jeff Bridges, Meryl Streep, Taylor Swift	United States	Animation Action Adventure
Godzilla	Gareth Edwards	Aaron Johnson, Elizabeth Olsen, Bryan Cranston	Japan; United States	Kaijū Action Adventure
Guardians of the Galaxy	James Gunn	Chris Pratt, Dave Bautista, Zoe Saldaña	United States	Action Adventure Comedy
The Hunger Games: Mockingjay – Part 1	Francis Lawrence	Jennifer Lawrence, Josh Hutcherson, Liam Hemsworth	United States	Action Adventure Thriller
I, Frankenstein	Stuart Beattie	Aaron Eckhart, Bill Nighy, Yvonne Strahovski	United States	Fantasy Action
Interstellar	Christopher Nolan	Matthew McConaughey, Anne Hathaway, Jessica Chastain, Topher Grace, Michael Caine	United Kingdom; United States	Adventure Drama
Iron Man and Captain America: Heroes United	Leo Riley	Adrian Pasdar (voice), Roger Craig Smith (voice), Clancy Brown (voice), Fred Tatasciore (voice)	United States	Action Adventure Animation
Justice League: War	Jay Oliva	Alan Tudyk, Shemar Moore, Steve Blum	United States	Animation Action Adventure Drama
Lucy	Luc Besson	Scarlett Johansson, Morgan Freeman	France	Action Thriller
The Maze Runner	Wes Ball	Dylan O'Brien, Will Poulter, Thomas Sangster, Aml Ameen	United States	Action Mystery Thriller
Monsters: Dark Continent	Tom Green	Johnny Harris, Sam Keeley, Joe Dempsie	United Kingdom	Action Drama Horror Thriller War
Outpost 37 (a.k.a Alien Outpost)	Jabbar Raisani	Kenneth Fok, Stevel Marc, Joe Reegan	South Africa; United Kingdom	Action Thriller
Mr. Peabody & Sherman	Rob Minkoff	Ty Burrell, Max Charles	United States	Animation Adventure Comedy Drama Family Fantasy History
Parasyte: Part 1 (a.k.a Kiseijuu)	Takashi Yamazaki	Shota Sometani	Japan	Action Drama Horror
Predestination	Peter Spierig, Michael Spierig	Ethan Hawke	Australia	Action Drama Thriller
The Purge: Anarchy	James DeMonaco	Frank Grillo, Carmen Ejogo	United States	Action Horror Thriller
The Quiet Hour	Stéphanie Joalland	Karl Davies, Brigitte Millar, Dakota Blue Richards	Ireland; United Kingdom	Drama Thriller
RoboCop	José Padilha	Joel Kinnaman, Gary Oldman, Michael Keaton, Samuel L. Jackson	United States	Action Crime Thriller
The Signal	William Eubank	Brenton Thwaites, Olivia Cooke, Laurence Fishburne, Sarah Clarke	United States	Drama Mystery Thriller
Space Station 76	Jack Plotnick	Patrick Wilson, Liv Tyler, Matt Bomer	United States	Comedy Drama
Star Blazers: Odyssey of the Celestial Ark (a.k.a Uchu Senkan Yamato 2199: Hoshi-Meguru Hakobune)	Yutaka Izubuchi, Makoto Bessho	Daisuke Ono, Eriko Nakamura, Aya Hisakawa, Masato Kokubun, Yuuya Chikaki, Junichi Suwabe, Ryuzaburo Otomo, Saki Fujita	Japan	Animation Action Adventure Drama
Star Blazers 2199: A Voyage to Remember (a.k.a Uchu Senkan Yamato 2199: Tsuioku no Kokai)	Yutaka Izubuchi	Kikuko Inoue, Houko Kuwashima, Daisuke Ono, Takayuki Sugô, Kenichi Suzumura, Kôichi Yamadera, Hôchû Ôtsuka	Japan	Animation Action Adventure Drama
Teenage Mutant Ninja Turtles	Jonathan Liebesman	Megan Fox, Will Arnett, William Fichtner, Whoopi Goldberg	United States	Action Adventure Comedy
Time Lapse	Bradley D. King	Danielle Panabaker, Matt O'Leary, George Finn	United States	Horror Thriller
Transcendence	Wally Pfister	Johnny Depp, Paul Bettany, Rebecca Hall	United States	Action Drama Thriller
Transformers: Age of Extinction	Michael Bay	Mark Wahlberg, Stanley Tucci, Jack Reynor, Nicola Peltz	United States	Action Adventure
Spring	Aaron Scott Moorhead	Vanessa Bednar, Nadia Hilker, Lou Taylor Pucci	United States	Horror Romance
Under the Skin	Jonathan Glazer	Scarlett Johansson, Kryštof Hádek, Robert J. Goodwin	United Kingdom	Drama Horror Mystery Thriller
Vincent	Thomas Salvador	Thomas Salvador, Vimala Pons, Youssef Hajdi	French	
X-Men: Days of Future Past	Bryan Singer	Hugh Jackman, James McAvoy, Michael Fassbender, Jennifer Lawrence	United States	Action Adventure Thriller
Young Ones	Jake Paltrow	Nicholas Hoult, Elle Fanning, Michael Shannon	United States	Action Drama Romance Western
2015
Title	Director	Cast	Country	Subgenre/Notes
Advantageous	Jennifer Phang	Jacqueline Kim, James Urbaniak, Freya Adams, Ken Jeong, Samantha King	United States	Drama Family
Aliens: Zone-X	Thomas R. Dickens	David J. Burke, Chris Harper	United States	
Ant-Man	Peyton Reed	Paul Rudd, Michael Douglas, Evangeline Lilly	United States	Action Adventure Comedy
Avengers: Age of Ultron	Joss Whedon	Robert Downey Jr., Chris Evans, Scarlett Johansson	United States	Action Adventure
Chappie	Neill Blomkamp	Sharlto Copley, Watkin Tudor Jones, Yolandi Visser	United States	Action Crime Drama Thriller
Circle	Aaron Hann	Michael Nardelli, Carter Jenkins, Lawrence Kao, Allegra Masters	United States	Drama Horror Mystery Thriller
Credence	Mike Buonaiuto	Richie Stephens, Alex Hammond, Anthony Topham, Tia Kenny	United Kingdom	LGBT drama
The Divergent Series: Insurgent	Robert Schwentke	Shailene Woodley, Theo James, Ansel Elgort	United States	Action Adventure Thriller
The End of the World and the Cat's Disappearance	Michihiro Takeuchi	Izukoneko, Jun Aonami, Daisuke Nishijima	Japan	
Equals	Drake Doremus	Nicholas Hoult, Vernetta Lopez, Scott Lawrence	United States	Drama Romance
Ex Machina	Alex Garland	Domhnall Gleeson, Alicia Vikander, Oscar Isaac	United Kingdom	Drama Thriller
Fantastic Four	Josh Trank	Miles Teller, Kate Mara, Michael B. Jordan, Jamie Bell	United States	Action Adventure
Ghost in the Shell Arise Border 5 : Pyrophoric	Kazuchika Kise	Maaya Sakamoto (voice), Ikkyû Jaku (voice), Ken'ichirô Matsuda (voice), Tarusuke Shingaki (voice)	Japan	Action Animation
Ghost in the Shell: The New Movie	Kazuchika Kise, Kazuya Nomura	Maaya Sakamoto (voice), Ikkyuu Juku (voice), Kenichirou Matsuda (voice), Tarusuke Shingaki (voice)	Japan	Animation Action
Hardcore Henry	Ilya Naishuller	Sharlto Copley, Tim Roth, Haley Bennett	Russia; United States	Action Adventure Thriller
The Hunger Games: Mockingjay – Part 2	Francis Lawrence	Jennifer Lawrence, Josh Hutcherson, Liam Hemsworth	United States	Action Adventure Thriller
Hot Tub Time Machine 2	Steve Pink	Rob Corddry, Craig Robinson, Clark Duke, Adam Scott	United States	Comedy
Infini	Shane Abbess	Daniel MacPherson, Grace Huang, Luke Hemsworth	Australia	Horror Thriller
Jupiter Ascending	The Wachowskis	Mila Kunis, Channing Tatum, Sean Bean, Eddie Redmayne	United States	Action Adventure Space opera
Jurassic World	Colin Trevorrow	Chris Pratt, Bryce Dallas Howard, Ty Simpkins, Nick Robinson	United States	Action Adventure
Justice League: Gods and Monsters	Sam Liu	Benjamin Bratt, Michael C. Hall, Tamara Taylor, Paget Brewster (all voice)	United States	Action Animation
Justice League: Throne of Atlantis	Ethan Spaulding	Rosario Dawson, Nathan Fillion, Christopher Gorham, Matt Lanter (all voice)	United States	Adventure Animation Action
Lego DC Comics Super Heroes: Justice League – Attack of the Legion of Doom	Rick Morales	Troy Baker (voice), Nolan North (voice), Khary Payton (voice), Grey Griffin (voice)	United States	Comedy Adventure Animation Action Family
Mad Max: Fury Road	George Miller	Tom Hardy, Charlize Theron, Nicholas Hoult	Australia; United States	Action Adventure Thriller
The Martian	Ridley Scott	Matt Damon, Jessica Chastain, Jeff Daniels	United States	Adventure Drama
Maze Runner: The Scorch Trials	Wes Ball	Dylan O'Brien, Thomas Brodie-Sangster, Giancarlo Esposito	United States	Action Adventure Thriller
MindGamers	Andrew Goth	Tom Payne, Dominique Tipper, Sam Neill, Melia Kreiling	Austria	Action Thriller
Mobile Suit Gundam The Origin I and II	Yoshikazu Yasuhiko, Takashi Imanishi	Mayumi Tanaka, Megumi Han, Jin Urayama, Banjô Ginga, (all voice)	Japan	Action Animation
Monsters: Dark Continent	Tom Green	Joe Dempsie, Johnny Harris, Sofia Boutella	United Kingdom	Action Drama Horror Thriller War
On Line	Li Changxin	Liu Mengmeng, Li Ning, Kang Enhe	China	Action
Parasyte: Part 2 (a.k.a Kiseijuu: Kanketsuhen)	Takashi Yamazaki	Tadanobu Asano, Jun Kunimura, Shôta Sometani, Kazuki Kitamura	Japan	Action Drama Horror
Pixels	Chris Columbus	Adam Sandler, Kevin James, Michelle Monaghan, Peter Dinklage	United States	Action Comedy Fantasy
Project Almanac	Dean Israelite	Jonny Weston, Sofia Black-D'Elia, Amy Landecker	United States	Drama Mystery Thriller
Psycho-Pass: The Movie a.k.a Gekijouban Psycho-Pass	Naoyoshi Shiotani	Kana Hanazawa, Tomokazu Seki, Hiroshi Kamiya, Ayane Sakura	Japan	Animation Action Crime Thriller
Self/less	Tarsem Singh	Ryan Reynolds, Ben Kingsley	United States	Action Mystery Thriller
Star Wars: The Force Awakens	J. J. Abrams	Harrison Ford, Mark Hamill, Carrie Fisher, Adam Driver, Daisy Ridley, John Boyega, Oscar Isaac, Lupita Nyong'o, Andy Serkis, Max von Sydow	United States	Space opera
Terminator Genisys	Alan Taylor	Arnold Schwarzenegger, Jason Clarke, Emilia Clarke, Jai Courtney	United States	Time travel action
They Call Me Jeeg	Gabriele Mainetti	Claudio Santamaria, Luca Marinelli, Ilenia Pastorelli, Stefano Ambrogi	Italian	Drama Science Fiction Action
Tomorrowland	Brad Bird	Britt Robertson, George Clooney	United States	Action Adventure Family Fantasy Mystery
Turbo Kid	François Simard, Anouk Whissell, Yoann-Karl Whissell	Munro Chambers, Laurence Leboeuf, Edwin Wright, Aaron Jeffery, Michael Ironside	New Zealand Canada	Action Adventure Comedy Horror
Vice	Brian A. Miller	Bruce Willis, Thomas Jane, Ambyr Childers	United States	Action Thriller
Indru Netru Naalai	R. Ravikumar	Vishnu Vishal, Miya George	India	Comedy
2016
Title	Director	Cast	Country	Subgenre/Notes
The 5th Wave	J Blakeson	Chloë Grace Moretz, Nick Robinson, Alex Roe, Liev Schreiber	United States	Action Adventure Thriller
10 Cloverfield Lane	Dan Trachtenberg	Mary Elizabeth Winstead, John Goodman, John Gallagher Jr., Bradley Cooper	United States	Drama Horror Mystery Thriller
24	Vikram Kumar	Suriya, Samantha Ruth Prabhu, Nithya Menen	India	Action Comedy Drama Musical Thriller
Approaching the Unknown	Mark Elijah Rosenberg	Mark Strong, Luke Wilson, Sanaa Lathan	United States	Drama Thriller
Arrival	Denis Villeneuve	Amy Adams, Jeremy Renner, Forest Whitaker	United States	Drama Mystery
ARQ	Tony Elliott	Robbie Amell, Rachael Taylor, Shaun Benson, Gray Powell, Adam Butcher	United States Canada	Action Thriller
Assassin's Creed	Justin Kurzel	Michael Fassbender, Marion Cotillard, Jeremy Irons, Brendan Gleeson	United States	Action Adventure
Batman v Superman: Dawn of Justice	Zack Snyder	Henry Cavill, Ben Affleck, Amy Adams, Laurence Fishburne, Gal Gadot	United States	Action Adventure Superhero
Captain America: Civil War	Russo brothers	Chris Evans, Robert Downey Jr., Scarlett Johansson	United States	Action Adventure Superhero
Cell	Tod Williams	John Cusack, Stacy Keach, Samuel L. Jackson	United States	Action Adventure Horror Thriller
Colossal	Nacho Vigalondo	Anne Hathaway, Dan Stevens, Jason Sudeikis, Austin Stowell, Tim Blake Nelson	Canada; Spain	Comedy Drama
Cutie Honey: Tears	Asai Takeshi	Mariya Nishiuchi	Japan	
Deadpool	Tim Miller	Ryan Reynolds, Morena Baccarin, Ed Skrein, T. J. Miller, Gina Carano, Brianna Hildebrand	United States	Action Adventure Comedy Superhero
The Divergent Series: Allegiant	Robert Schwentke	Shailene Woodley, Theo James	United States	Action Adventure Mystery Thriller
Einstein's God Model	Philip T. Johnson	Aaron Graham, Kenneth Hughes, Brad Norman, Kirby O'Connell	United States	
Gantz: O	Keiichi Sato	Daisuke Ono, Mao Ichimichi, Tomohiro Kaku, Saori Hayami, Shūichi Ikeda, Masane Tsukayama, Yūki Kaji	Japan	Animation Action Drama Fantasy Thriller
Ghostbusters	Paul Feig	Melissa McCarthy, Kristen Wiig, Kate McKinnon, Leslie Jones	United States	Action Comedy Fantasy
The Girl with All the Gifts	Colm McCarthy	Gemma Arterton, Paddy Considine, Glenn Close	United Kingdom	Action Adventure Drama Horror Thriller
Here Alone	Rod Blackhurst	Lucy Walters, Gina Piersanti, Shane West	United States	Horror Sci-fi
Independence Day: Resurgence	Roland Emmerich	Liam Hemsworth, Jessie Usher, Jeff Goldblum	United States	Action Adventure
Infinity Chamber	Travis Milloy	Christopher Soren Kelly, Cassandra Clark, Cajardo Lindsey, Jesse D. Arrow	United States	
Let's Be Evil	Martin Owen	Isabelle Allen, Jamie Bernadette, Kara Tointon, Elliot James Langridge, Elizabeth Morris	United Kingdom	
Lost in the Pacific	Vincent Zhou	Brandon Routh, Zhang Yuqi	China	
Mafia: The Game of Survival	Sarik Andreasyan	Viktor Verzhbitsky, Veniamin Smekhov, Yuri Chursin	Russia	Sci-fi Game Thriller
Max Steel	Stewart Hendler	Ben Winchell, Ana Villafañe, Andy García	United States	Action Adventure Fantasy
Midnight Special	Jeff Nichols	Michael Shannon, Joel Edgerton, Kirsten Dunst	United States	Drama Mystery Thriller
Mobile Suit Gundam The Origin III and IV	Yoshikazu Yasuhiko Takashi Imanishi	Shuichi Ikeda, Saori Hayami, Shigeo Kiyama, Kazuya Ichijo (all voice)	Japan	Animation Action
Morgan	Luke Scott	Kate Mara, Anya Taylor-Joy, Paul Giamatti	United States	Action Horror Thriller
Operation Avalanche	Matt Johnson	Matt Johnson, Owen Williams, Andy Appelle	United States	
The Purge: Election Year	James DeMonaco	Frank Grillo, Elizabeth Mitchell, Mykelti Williamson	United States	Action Horror Thriller
Passengers	Morten Tyldum	Jennifer Lawrence, Chris Pratt, Michael Sheen, Laurence Fishburne, Andy Garcia	United States	Drama Romance Thriller
Ratchet & Clank	Kevin Munroe	James Arnold Taylor, David Kaye, Paul Giamatti, John Goodman	United States	Animation Action Adventure Comedy Family
Resident Evil: The Final Chapter	Paul W. S. Anderson	Milla Jovovich, Iain Glen, Ali Larter, Shawn Roberts	Germany Canada	Action Horror
Rogue One	Gareth Edwards	Felicity Jones, Diego Luna, Riz Ahmed, Alan Tudyk, Donnie Yen, Jiang Wen, Ben Mendelsohn, Mads Mikkelsen, Forest Whitaker, James Earl Jones	United States	Space opera
Rupture	Steven Shainberg	Noomi Rapace, Peter Stormare, Kerry Bishé	United States; Canada	Horror Thriller
Shin Godzilla	Hideaki Anno, Shinji Higuchi	Hiroki Hasegawa, Yutaka Takenouchi, Satomi Ishihara	Japan	Action Drama Horror Kaijū
Spectral	Nic Mathieu	James Badge Dale, Max Martini, Emily Mortimer, Bruce Greenwood	United States	Action Adventure
Star Trek Beyond	Justin Lin	Chris Pine, Idris Elba, Zachary Quinto, Zoe Saldaña, Karl Urban, Simon Pegg, Sofia Boutella	United States	Action Adventure Thriller
Teenage Mutant Ninja Turtles: Out of the Shadows	Dave Green	Megan Fox, Stephen Amell, Will Arnett, Tyler Perry, Laura Linney	United States	Action Adventure Comedy
Terra Formars	Takashi Miike	Hideaki Itō, Emi Takei, Tomohisa Yamashita, Takayuki Yamada, Shun Oguri	Japan	Action Horror
X-Men: Apocalypse	Bryan Singer	James McAvoy, Michael Fassbender, Jennifer Lawrence, Oscar Isaac	United States	Action Adventure Superhero
2017
Title	Director	Cast	Country	Subgenre/Notes
24 Hours to Live	Brain Smrz	Ethan Hawke, Xu Qing, Paul Anderson	South Africa; United States	Action thriller
Alien: Covenant	Ridley Scott	Michael Fassbender, Katherine Waterston	United Kingdom; United States	
Attraction	Fyodor Bondarchuk		Russia	
Beyond Skyline	Liam O'Donnell	Frank Grillo, Bojana Novakovic, Iko Uwais	United States	
Blade Runner 2049	Denis Villeneuve	Harrison Ford, Ryan Gosling, Robin Wright, Dave Bautista, Ana de Armas	United States	
Blame!	Hiroyuki Seshita	Takahiro Sakurai, Kana Hanazawa, Sora Amamiya, Mamoru Miyano	Japan	Anime Sci-fi Action
Bokeh	Geoffrey Orthwein, Andrew Sullivan	Maika Monroe, Matt O'Leary, Arnar Jónsson	United States	Drama
Curvature	Diego Hallivis	Lyndsy Fonseca, Linda Hamilton	United States	Techno-thriller
The Circle	James Ponsoldt	Tom Hanks, Emma Watson, Patton Oswalt	United States	Mystery thriller
Despicable Me 3	Pierre Coffin, Kyle Balda	Steve Carell (voice), Kristen Wiig (voice), Trey Parker (voice), Miranda Cosgrove (voice)	United States	Comedy Animation Family
Downsizing	Alexander Payne	Matt Damon, Christoph Waltz	United States	Comedy-drama
Flatliners	Niels Arden Oplev	Elliot Page, Diego Luna, Nina Dobrev, James Norton, Kiersey Clemons, Kiefer Sutherland	United States	Sci-fi Psychological Horror
Fullmetal Alchemist	Fumihiko Sori	Ryosuke Yamada, Tsubasa Honda, Dean Fujioka, Ryuta Sato, Jun Kunimura, Fumiyo Kohinata, Yasuko Matsuyuki	Japan	Science Fiction Fantasy
Geostorm	Dean Devlin	Gerard Butler, Abbie Cornish	United States	Disaster film
Ghost in the Shell	Rupert Sanders	Scarlett Johansson, Pilou Asbæk	United States	1995 anime remake
Godzilla: Planet of the Monsters	Kōbun Shizuno; Hiroyuki Seshita		Japan	
Guardians	Sarik Andreasyan	Sebastien Sisak, Sanzhar Madiyev, Anton Pampushnyy, Alina Lanina	Russia	Superhero
Guardians of the Galaxy Vol. 2	James Gunn	Chris Pratt, Dave Bautista, Zoe Saldaña	United States	Superhero
How to Talk to Girls at Parties	John Cameron Mitchell	Elle Fanning, Alex Sharp, Nicole Kidman, Ruth Wilson, Matt Lucas	United Kingdom; United States	Romantic comedy
IBoy	Adam Randall	Bill Milner, Maisie Williams, Jordan Bolger, Charley Palmer Rothwell	United Kingdom	Teen thriller film
Kill Switch	Tim Smit	Dan Stevens, Bérénice Marlohe, Tygo Gernandt, Charity Wakefield	United States	
Kong: Skull Island	Jordan Vogt-Roberts	Tom Hiddleston, Samuel L. Jackson, John Goodman	United States	
Marjorie Prime	Michael Almereyda	Jon Hamm, Geena Davis, Lois Smith, Tim Robbins	United States	
Jupiter's Moon	Kornél Mundruczó	Merab Ninidze, Zsombor Jéger, György Cserhalmi	Hungary	Superhero
The Last Scout	Simon Phillips	Blaine Grey, Simon Phillips, Peter Woodward	United Kingdom	
Life	Daniel Espinosa	Ryan Reynolds, Rebecca Ferguson, Jake Gyllenhaal, Hiroyuki Sanada	United States	Horror thriller
Logan	James Mangold	Hugh Jackman, Patrick Stewart, Dafne Keen	United States	Superhero drama
The Man from Earth: Holocene	Richard Schenkman	David Lee Smith, William Katt, Vanessa Williams, Michael Dorn	United States	Sequel to The Man from Earth (2007)
The Man with the Magic Box	Bodo Kox	Olga Bołądź, Piotr Polak, Sebastian Stankiewicz	Poland; Italy	Dystopian thriller, time travel
Mobile Suit Gundam The Origin V	Yoshikazu Yasuhiko Takashi Imanishi	Shuichi Ikeda, Megumi Han, Toru Furuya, Toshio Furukawa (all voice)	Japan	Action War Animation
Orbiter 9	Hatem Khraiche	Clara Lago, Álex González	Spain Colombia	Romantic drama
OtherLife	Ben C. Lucas	Jessica De Gouw, T.J. Power, Thomas Cocquerel, Clarence Ryan, Tiriel Mora, Adriane Daff	Australia	Thriller
Power Rangers	Dean Israelite	Naomi Scott, Becky G, RJ Cyler, Dacre Montgomery, Ludi Lin	United States	Superhero Coming-of-age
The Recall	Mauro Borrelli	Wesley Snipes, RJ Mitte	United States; Canada	
Rememory	Mark Palansky	Peter Dinklage, Julia Ormond, Anton Yelchin, Colin Lawrence	United Kingdom United States Canada	Mystery film
Resident Evil: Vendetta	Takanori Tsujimoto	Kevin Dorman, Matthew Mercer, Erin Cahill, John DeMita	Japan	Animation Action Adventure Horror Mystery
Revolt	Joe Miale	Lee Pace, Bérénice Marlohe	United States	
Singularity	Robert Kouba	John Cusack, Carmen Argenziano, Julian Schaffner, Jeannine Wacker	Switzerland United States	
The Space Between Us	Peter Chelsom	Asa Butterfield, Britt Robertson, Gary Oldman	United States	Romantic drama
Spider-Man: Homecoming	Jon Watts	Tom Holland, Michael Keaton, Jon Favreau, Gwyneth Paltrow	United States	Superhero
Starship Troopers: Traitor of Mars	Shinji Aramaki, Masaru Matsumoto	Casper Van Dien, Dina Meyer, DeRay Davis	Japan United States	Animation Action
Star Wars: The Last Jedi	Rian Johnson	Mark Hamill, Carrie Fisher, Adam Driver, Daisy Ridley, John Boyega, Oscar Isaac, Andy Serkis, Lupita Nyong'o, Laura Dern, Benicio del Toro	United States	Space opera
Teen Titans: The Judas Contract	Sam Liu	Stuart Allan, Jake T. Austin, Taissa Farmiga, Christina Ricci	United States	Action Animation
Thor: Ragnarok	Taika Waititi	Chris Hemsworth, Tom Hiddleston, Cate Blanchett	United States	Superhero
Time Trap	Ben Foster and Mark Dennis	Brianne Howey, Cassidy Erin Gifford, Olivia Draguicevich, Andrew Wilson, Reiley McClendon	United States	Adventure
Transformers: The Last Knight	Michael Bay	Mark Wahlberg, Isabela Moner, Josh Duhamel, Tyrese Gibson	United States	Action
Valerian and the City of a Thousand Planets	Luc Besson	Dane DeHaan, Cara Delevingne, Clive Owen, Rihanna, Ethan Hawke	France	
War for the Planet of the Apes	Matt Reeves	Andy Serkis, Steve Zahn, Woody Harrelson	United States	
Werewolves of the Third Reich	Andrew Jones	Annabelle Lanyon, Lee Bane, Derek Nelson	United Kingdom	Horror
What Happened to Monday	Tommy Wirkola	Noomi Rapace, Willem Dafoe, Glenn Close	United Kingdom; United States; France; Belgium	
2018
Title	Director	Cast	Country	Subgenre/Notes
2.0	S. Shankar	Rajinikanth, Amy Jackson	India	Action
Aliens Ate My Homework	Sean McNamara	Jayden Greig, William Shatner, Dan Payne	United States	Comedy
Annihilation	Alex Garland	Natalie Portman, Jennifer Jason Leigh, Tessa Thompson	United States	Horror
Anon	Andrew Niccol	Clive Owen, Amanda Seyfried	United States	Thriller
Ant-Man and the Wasp	Peyton Reed	Paul Rudd, Evangeline Lilly, Michael Douglas	United States	Superhero
Avengers: Infinity War	Russo brothers	Robert Downey Jr., Josh Brolin, Chris Evans, Scarlett Johansson	United States	Superhero
Await Further Instructions	Johnny Kevorkian	Sam Gittins, Neerja Naik, Abigail Cruttenden, David Bradley	United States	Horror, Mystery
A.X.L.	Oliver Daly	Alex Neustaedter, Becky G, Alex MacNicoll, Dominic Rains, Thomas Jane	United States	Adventure
Beyond the Sky	Fulvio Sestito	Ryan Carnes, [[[Jordan Hinson]], Claude Duhamel, Martin Sensmeier, Don Stark, Peter Stormare, Dee Wallace	United States	Alien abduction
Bird Box	Susanne Bier	Sandra Bullock, Trevante Rhodes, Danielle Macdonald, Rosa Salazar	United States	
Black Panther	Ryan Coogler	Chadwick Boseman, Lupita Nyong'o, Michael B. Jordan	United States	Action Adventure Superhero
Bumblebee	Travis Knight	Hailee Steinfeld, John Cena, Jorge Lendeborg Jr., John Ortiz, Jason Drucker, Pamela Adlon	United States	Action
Collider	Justin Lewis	Christine Mascolo, Jude Moran, Elena Rose Davis	United States	Time travel
The Cloverfield Paradox	Julius Onah	David Oyelowo, Gugu Mbatha-Raw	United States	Horror
Deadpool 2	David Leitch	Ryan Reynolds, Josh Brolin	United States	Superhero
The Death of Superman	Sam Liu, Jake Castorena	Jerry O'Connell, Rebecca Romijn, Rainn Wilson, Rosario Dawson (all voice)	United States	Drama Animation Action
Elizabeth Harvest	Sebastian Gutierrez	Abbey Lee, Dylan Baker, Matthew Beard, Carla Gugino, Ciarán Hinds	United States	Thriller
Extinction	Ben Young	Michael Peña, Lizzy Caplan	United States	Action
The First Purge	Gerard McMurray		United States	Dystopian action thriller
Forsaken	Alexander Kulikov	Alexander Kulikov	Russia	Psychological thriller
Freaks	Adam Stein, Zach Lipovsky	Emile Hirsch, Bruce Dern, Grace Park	United States Canada	Science fiction thriller film
Godzilla: City on the Edge of Battle	Kōbun Shizuno, Hiroyuki Seshita		Japan	Animated kaiju
Godzilla: The Planet Eater	Kōbun Shizuno, Hiroyuki Seshita		Japan	Animated kaiju
High Life	Claire Denis	Robert Pattinson, Mia Goth, Juliette Binoche	United Kingdom; France; Germany	Horror
His Master's Voice	György Pálfi	Kate Vernon, Marshall Williams, Eric Peterson	Hungary; Canada	
Hotel Artemis	Drew Pearce	Jodie Foster, Sterling K. Brown, Sofia Boutella, Jeff Goldblum	United States	Dystopian tech noir thriller
How It Ends	David M. Rosenthal	Theo James, Forest Whitaker, Grace Dove, Kat Graham, Mark O'Brien	United States	Action thriller
The Humanity Bureau	Rob W. King	Nicolas Cage, Sarah Lind	Canada	Thriller film
Illang: The Wolf Brigade	Kim Jee-woon	Gang Dong-won, Han Hyo-joo, Jung Woo-sung, Kim Mu-yeol	South Korea	
Isle of Dogs	Wes Anderson	Bryan Cranston (voice), Koyu Rankin (voice), Edward Norton (voice)	United States; Germany	Stop-motion animation science fiction/comedy film
Jonathan	Bill Oliver	Ansel Elgort, Suki Waterhouse, Patricia Clarkson	United States	American drama
Jurassic World: Fallen Kingdom	Juan Antonio Bayona	Chris Pratt, Bryce Dallas Howard	United States	Adventure
Kin	Jonathan Baker, Josh Baker	Jack Reynor, James Franco	United States	Crime drama
Level 16	Danishka Esterhazy	Katie Douglas, Celina Martin, Peter Outerbridge, Sara Canning	Canada	Dystopian Horror
Maze Runner: The Death Cure	Wes Ball	Dylan O'Brien	United States	Dystopian
Mobile Suit Gundam The Origin VI	Yoshikazu Yasuhiko Takashi Imanishi	Shuichi Ikeda, Megumi Han, Jin Urayama, Banjo Ginga (all voice)	Japan	Action War Animation
Mortal Engines	Christian Rivers	Robert Sheehan, Hera Hilmar, Leila George, Ronan Raftery	United States	Post-apocalyptic action adventure
Mute	Duncan Jones	Alexander Skarsgård, Paul Rudd, Justin Theroux	United Kingdom; Germany	Neo-noir
Nekrotronic	Kiah Roache-Turner	Ben O'Toole, Monica Bellucci, Caroline Ford	Australia	Comedy horror
Next Gen	Kevin R. Adams, Joe Ksander	John Krasinski, Charlyne Yi, Jason Sudeikis, Michael Peña, David Cross, Constance Wu	United States; Canada; China	Science Fiction Action
Occupation	Luke Sparke	Dan Ewing, Temuera Morrison, Stephany Jacobsen	Australia	Action
Overlord	Julius Avery	Jovan Adepo, Wyatt Russell, Mathilde Ollivier	United States	War horror
Pacific Rim Uprising	Steven S. DeKnight	John Boyega, Cailee Spaeny, Scott Eastwood	United States	Action
The Predator	Shane Black	Boyd Holbrook, Olivia Munn, Trevante Rhodes	United States	Action
Prospect	Zeek Earl, Christopher Caldwell	Sophie Thatcher, Pedro Pascal	United States	
Psychokinesis	Yeon Sang-ho	Ryu Seung-ryong, Shim Eun-kyung, Park Jeong-min, Kim Min-jae	South Korea	Superhero
A Quiet Place	John Krasinski	Emily Blunt, John Krasinski	United States	
Rampage	Brad Peyton	Dwayne Johnson, Naomie Harris, Malin Åkerman, Joe Manganiello, Jake Lacy, Marley Shelton, Jeffrey Dean Morgan	United States	Monster film
Ready Player One	Steven Spielberg	Tye Sheridan, Olivia Cooke	United States	Action-adventure
Solo: A Star Wars Story	Ron Howard	Alden Ehrenreich, Donald Glover, Emilia Clarke, Woody Harrelson, Thandiwe Newton, Phoebe Waller-Bridge, Joonas Suotamo, Paul Bettany	United States	Space Western
Spider-Man: Into the Spider-Verse	Bob Persichetti, Peter Ramsey, Rodney Rothman	Jake Johnson (voice), Hailee Steinfeld (voice), Mahershala Ali (voice), Brian Tyree Henry (voice)	United States	Animated superhero film
Superlopez	Javier Ruiz Caldera	Dani Rovira, Alexandra Jiménez, Julián López, Pedro Casablanc	Spain	Superhero
Tau	Frederico D'Alessendro	Maika Monroe, Ed Skrein, Gary Oldman	United States	Thriller
The Titan	Lennart Ruff	Sam Worthington, Taylor Schilling	United Kingdom; Spain; United States	Thriller
Upgrade	Leigh Whannell	Logan Marshall-Green	Australia	Cyberpunk action body horror
Venom	Ruben Fleischer	Tom Hardy, Michelle Williams, Riz Ahmed	United States	Superhero
2019
Title	Director	Cast	Country	Subgenres/Notes
9	Jenuse Mohamed	Prithviraj Sukumaran, Mamtha Mohandas, Prakash Raj, Wamiqa Gabbi, Master Alok	India	Supernatural horror
3022	John Suits	Omar Epps, Kate Walsh, Miranda Cosgrove, Angus Macfadyen	United States	
Ad Astra	James Gray	Brad Pitt, Tommy Lee Jones, Ruth Negga, Liv Tyler, Donald Sutherland	United States	Psychological drama
Alien Warfare	Jeremiah Jones	Clayton Snyder, Daniel Washington, Larissa Andrade, Kaitlyn Hiller	United States	Action
Alita: Battle Angel	Robert Rodriguez	Rosa Salazar, Mahershala Ali, Christoph Waltz	United States	Cyberpunk
Aniara	Pella Kågerman, Hugo Lilja	Emelie Jonsson, Bianca Cruzeiro, Arvin Kananian	Sweden	
Assimilate	John Murlowski	Joel Courtney, Andi Matichak, Calum Worthy	United States	Horror film
Astro Kid	Éric Tosti	Timothé Vom Dorp, Édouard Baer, Barbara Tissier, Marie-Eugénie Maréchal, Guillaume Lebon	France	Children animated film
Avengers: Endgame	Russo brothers	Robert Downey Jr., Josh Brolin, Chris Evans, Scarlett Johansson	United States	Superhero
The Legend of Black Snake	Thomas Ngijol, Karole Rocher	Thomas Ngijol, Karole Rocher, Michel Gohou, Edouard Baer	France	Superhero
Brightburn	David Yarovesky	Elizabeth Banks, David Denman	United States	Superhero horror
Captain Marvel	Anna Boden and Ryan Fleck	Brie Larson, Samuel L. Jackson, Jude Law	United States	Superhero
Captive State	Rupert Wyatt	John Goodman, Vera Farmiga, Ashton Sanders, Jonathan Majors	United States	Crime thriller
Cargo	Arati Kadav	Vikrant Massey, Shweta Tripathi	India	
Code 8	Jeff Chan	Robbie Amell, Stephen Amell, Sung Kang	Canada	Action
Cosmos	Elliot and Zander Weaver	Tom England, Joshua Ford, Arjun Singh Panam, Ben Vardy	United Kingdom	Mystery
Crazy Alien	Ning Hao	Huang Bo, Shen Teng, Matthew Morrison	China	Comedy
Dark Phoenix	Simon Kinberg	James McAvoy, Michael Fassbender, Jennifer Lawrence	United States	Superhero
Doom: Annihilation	Tony Giglio	Amy Manson, Dominic Mafham, Luke Allen-Gale, Nina Bergman	United States	Action
Gemini Man	Ang Lee	Will Smith, Mary Elizabeth Winstead	United States	Action thriller
Glass	M. Night Shyamalan	Bruce Willis, Samuel L. Jackson	United States	
Godzilla: King of the Monsters	Michael Dougherty	Millie Bobby Brown, Kyle Chandler, Vera Farmiga	United States	Monster film
Hello World	Tomohiko Itō	Takumi Kitamura, Tōri Matsuzaka, Minami Hamabe	Japan	Science fiction Romance
I Am Mother	Grant Sputore	Clara Rugaard, Rose Byrne, Hilary Swank	Australia	Thriller
In the Shadow of the Moon	Jim Mickle	Boyd Holbrook, Cleopatra Coleman, Michael C. Hall	United States	Thriller
Io	Jonathan Helpert	Margaret Qualley, Anthony Mackie	United States	
Iron Sky: The Coming Race	Timo Vuorensola	Julia Dietze, Udo Kier, Tom Green	Finland	Comic action
Men in Black: International	F. Gary Gray	Chris Hemsworth, Tessa Thompson	United States	Action comedy
Project Ghazi	Nadir Shah	Humayun Saeed, Sheheryar Munawar, Syra Shehroz, Adnan Jaffar	Pakistan	Action
Project Ithaca	Nicholas Humphries	James Gallanders	Canada	Science fiction film
Reign of the Supermen	Sam Liu	Jerry O'Connell, Rebecca Romijn, Rainn Wilson, Cress Williams (all voice)	United States	Animation Action
Replicas	Jeffrey Nachmanoff	Keanu Reeves, Alice Eve	United States	Thriller
Rim of the World	McG	Jack Gore, Miya Cech, Benjamin Flores Jr., Alessio Scalzotto	United States	
See You Yesterday	Stefon Bristol	Eden Duncan-Smith, Danté Crichlow, Brian "Stro" Bradley	United States	
Shanghai Fortress	Teng Huatao	Lu Han, Shu Qi	China	Action
Short Circuit	Faisal Hashmi	Dhvanit Thaker, Kinjal Rajpriya	India	Comedy-drama
Simon's Got a Gift	Léo Karmann	Benjamin Voisin, Martin Karmann, Camille Claris, Nicolas Wanczycki	France	
Star Wars: The Rise of Skywalker	J. J. Abrams	Mark Hamill, Carrie Fisher, Adam Driver, Daisy Ridley, John Boyega, Oscar Isaac, Naomi Ackie, Keri Russell, Ian McDiarmid, Billy Dee Williams	United States	Space opera
Terminator: Dark Fate	Tim Miller	Arnold Schwarzenegger, Linda Hamilton	United States	Action
The Wandering Earth	Frant Gwo	Wu Jing, Qu Chuxiao, Li Guangjie	China	Action
The Vast of Night	Andrew Patterson	Sierra McCormick, Jake Horowitz	United States	Mystery

== See also ==
- List of science fiction films of the 2000s
- List of science fiction films of the 2020s
- List of abandoned and unfinished films
