= Strings (2011 film) =

- Directed by: Mark Dennis; Ben Foster
- Written by: Mark Dennis
- Produced by: Mark Dennis; Ben Foster
- Starring: Billy Harvey; Elle LaMont; Daniel Dasent; Chris Potter; Karl Anderson; Jack Lee; Jon Wunsch
- Cinematography: Mike Simpson
- Edited by: Mark Dennis; Ben Foster
- Music by: Jermaine Stegall
- Release date: June 10, 2011 (Breckenridge Film Festival)
- Running time: 98 minutes
- Country: United States
- Language: English

Strings is a 2011 American dramatic thriller film about a musician who discovers his therapist manipulates patients into committing crimes. The film is the product of the Texas filmmaking team, Mark Dennis and Ben Foster. It was written, produced, and directed by Dennis and was produced and directed by Foster. Dennis and Foster graduated from the University of Texas at Austin with degrees in Radio/TV/Film and are both musicians. The extremely low-budget film collected major awards at film festivals across the United States in 2011 and 2012.

== American film festival screenings ==
- Austin Film Festival – October 2011
- The Breckenridge Festival of Film – June 2011
- Hollywood Film Festival – October 2011
- Long Island International Film Expo – July 2011
- Route 66 International Film Festival – September 2011
- San Francisco Best Actors (in a) Film Festival – May 2011
- Silver City Film Festival – November 2011
- SOHO International Film Festival - April 2012
- The Tri-State Film Festival – September 2012
- Tulsa International Film Festival – September 2011
- The White Sands International Film Festival – August 2011

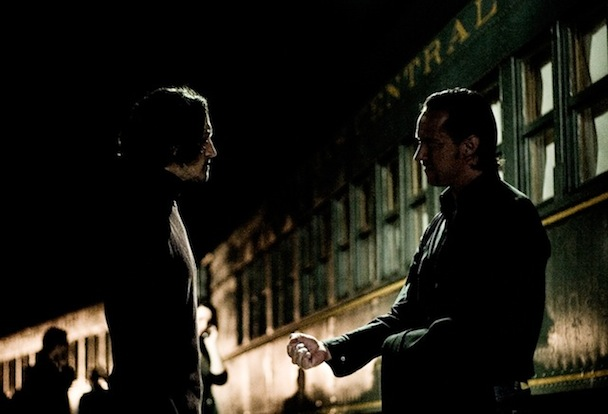
Still from Strings with Chris Potter and Karl Anderson.

== Reception ==
One reviewer compared Strings to the work of Christopher Nolan, describing it as "stirring, exciting, and poignant." The film received DVD distribution with House Lights Media, based in Colorado and digital distribution with The Orchard.

== Awards ==
The film collected the Best Director Award at the Long Island International Film Expo as well as Audience Awards at The Breckenridge Festival of Film and The White Sands International Film Festival and the award for Best Thriller at the Route 66 International Film Festival.

- Best Film at the SOHO International Film Festival
- Best Director (Mark Dennis and Ben Foster) at the Tulsa International Film Festival
- Best Director (Mark Dennis and Ben Foster) at the Long Island International Film Expo
- Audience Award at White Sands International Film Festival
- Audience Award at the Breckenridge Festival of Film
- Audience Award at the Silver City Film Festival
- Best Cinematography (Mike Simpson) at the Long Island International Film Expo
- Best Supporting Actor (Jack Lee) at the Long Island International Film Expo
- Best Song (The Greatest Escape, Billy Harvey) at the Breckenridge Festival of Film
- Best Ensemble Cast, San Francisco Best Actors Film Festival
- Best Thriller, Route 66 International Film Festival
