= Ben Foster (director) =

American film director and producer

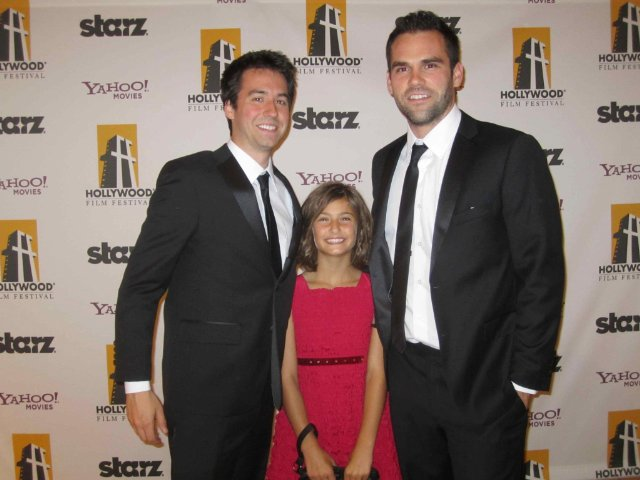
- Ben Foster (left) attending the 14th Annual Hollywood Awards Gala with Mark Dennis (right) and Olivia Draguicevich (center)
- Born: June 7, 1984 (age 41); Kansas City, Missouri, United States
- Occupations: Film director, film producer
- Years active: 2007–present

Ben Foster (born June 7, 1984) is an American film director and producer.

He has directed two feature films, Strings (2012), awarded on the US Festival circuit, and Time Trap (2017), held its world premiere at the Seattle International Film Festival in May 2017.

== Life and career ==
Foster was born in Kansas City, Missouri, and raised in Austin, Texas. During highschool he attended classes at the Austin School of Film He further pursued his education at The Maine Media Workshops, where he studied under actor Barry Primus. He attended the Radio, Television, and Film program at The University of Texas at Austin, where he met Mark Dennis. The two began collaborating on a number of shorts, and ultimately began production on Strings during Foster's senior year of college.

Strings was directed by Foster and Dennis. They also share producing, and editing credits on the film. Strings played a number of film festivals, including the Hollywood Film Festival and Austin Film Festival. It won Audience Awards at the Breckenridge Film Festival, White Sands International Film Festival, and Silver City Film Festival. The film is distributed by The Orchard.

In 2015, Foster and Dennis re-teamed to make Time Trap, a time travel adventure film, described as being reminiscent of the early-80s adventure movies, following a group of kids into a cave where time passes differently inside than on the surface. Time Trap world premiered at the Seattle International Film Festival in May, 2017.

Foster lives in Los Angeles, where he also produces and directs commercials.

== Awards and nominations ==
=== Strings (2011) ===
- Breckenridge Festival of Film: Winner Audience Award
- White Sands International Film Festival: Winner Audience Award
- Route 66 International Film Festival: Winner Best Thriller
- Long Island International Film Expo: Winner Best Director (with Mark Dennis)
- Long Island International Film Expo: Nomination for Best Feature
- Long Island International Film Expo: Nomination for Best First Feature
- Tulsa International Film Festival: Nomination for Best Feature
- Tulsa International Film Festival: Winner Best Director (with Mark Dennis)

=== Time Trap (2017) ===
- Seattle International Film Festival: Nominated Futurewave Youth Jury Award, Best Feature Film
- Hollywood Film Festival: Winner Jury Prize, Most Innovative Narrative feature (with Mark Dennis and Pad Thai Pictures)
