= Mark Dennis =

Mark Dennis may refer to:

- Mark Dennis (director), American director, editor, producer and composer
- Mark Dennis (footballer), English former footballer
- Mark Dennis (American football), American football offensive tackle
