= Austin Cinemaker Co-op =

Former film distribution cooperative in Texas

The Austin Cinemaker Co-op was a nonprofit Super 8 film collective based in Austin, Texas. The organization was founded by Barna Kantor, Kris DeForest, and Heyd Fontenot in 1996, and merged with the Center for Young Cinema to become the Austin School of Film in 2003. The organization provided Super 8 camera rentals and production training, regular Super 8 mini-festivals showcasing locally produced work, screening salons with visiting filmmakers, and other small-gauge film events for the Central Texas community. The organization embraced a grassroots, do-it-yourself ethos.

Started in a garage as a way to promote and celebrate small gauge filmmaking in Austin, the Cinemaker Co-op grew to a membership of over 200 with an office located in Austin's Artplex building before becoming the Austin School of Film. The group was best known for its quarterly mini-festivals, in which area residents were challenged to create one-reel, in-camera edited Super 8 films on a specific theme. Films were required to be "4x4" - no longer than four minutes long, with no more than four edits (splices) allowed. Films were typically submitted as silent, with a separate soundtrack provided on CD or cassette and played simultaneously during screenings.

Festivals took place at the upstairs lounge at the historic Ritz, before moving to The Hideout Theatre on Congress Ave. Festivals included the Halloween-themed Attack of the 50-Foot Reel and Texas Super-8 Massacre, the Splice of Life documentary festival, Tiny Prophecies for the turn of the millennium, and the popular, yearly MAFIA - Make a Film in a Weekend. The organization also hosted special collaborations such as the Golden Arm Project, which invited filmmakers to create works for 26 musical tracks produced by The Golden Arm Trio and musician/composer Graham Reynolds.

In 2001, the Cinemaker Co-op was awarded Best of Austin awards in the Critics' categories "Best Resource for Super 8 Filmmakers" and "Best Way to See if You've Got the Right Filmmaking Stuff" by the Austin Chronicle. The organization also received the second annual D. Montgomery Award from the Austin Film Society that year.

The Cinemaker Co-op also forged relationships with the now-defunct Cinematexas International Short Film Festival by presenting its annual kickoff screening and South by Southwest Film Festival, for which Cinemaker members provided festival trailers.

== Notable participants ==
Lee Daniel, cinematographer
Gonzalo "Gonzo" Gonzalez, camera operator, best boy
Justin Hennard, audio engineer
Bob Ray, filmmaker
Graham Reynolds, composer, musician
Luke Savisky, film and multimedia artist

Jen Proctor, filmmaker, film professor, EDIT Media co-founder

Shannon Silva, filmmaker, film professor, Visions Film Festival & Conference founder

Andre Silva, filmmaker, film professor

Aaron Valdez, filmmaker

Jodie Keeling, filmmaker

Richard McIntosh, filmmaker

James L. Bills, director, writer, colorist, cinematographer

Kerthy Fix, filmmaker, director, producer

Scott Rhodes, editor

Tiana Hux, filmmaker, musician, performer

Jennifer Hill, filmmaker

Rachel Tsangari, filmmaker, writer/director

Charles Nafus, advisory board

Guillermo del Toro, advisory board
