= Fingerprints (film) =

- Directed by: Harry Basil
- Written by: Brian Cleveland; Jason Cleveland
- Produced by: Brian Cleveland; Jason Cleveland
- Starring: Leah Pipes; Kristin Cavallari; Josh Henderson
- Cinematography: Michael Goi; Andrea V. Rossotto
- Release date: October 16, 2006 (Screamfest)
- Country: United States
- Language: English

Fingerprints is a 2006 American supernatural slasher film directed by Harry Basil, and starring Leah Pipes, Kristin Cavallari and Josh Henderson. The film follows a teenager (Pipes) experiencing supernatural occurrences as an unknown assailant begins murdering the town's residents.

== Plot ==
Fingerprints is based on an urban legend out of San Antonio, Texas about a school bus full of children that was involved in a terrible accident with a train leaving all the children dead. The movie centers on a teenage girl, Melanie (Pipes), who has just finished rehab. She moves to her family's new home in the town of Emerald, where her father is a part of the crew constructing a highway over the old train tracks. Her sister, Crystal (Cavallari), tells her of the legend and she begins seeing the ghost of Julie, one of the dead children and becomes more and more involved in mysterious occurrences in the town. Meanwhile, someone in a train conductor's uniform begins to murder the people around Melanie.

== Cast ==
- Leah Pipes as Melanie
- Kristin Cavallari as Crystal
- Michael Mendoza as Shawn
- Josh Henderson as Penn
- Sally Kirkland as Mary
- Andrew Lawrence as Mitch
- Geoffrey Lewis as Keeler
- Lou Diamond Phillips as Doug
- Ashley Watt as Carolyn
- Glen Jensen as Kowalski
- Sydnee Harlan as Julie

== Filming ==
Fingerprints was filmed in April and May 2006 in two Oklahoma towns. Parts of the film center around Emerald High School that Cavallari attends in the fictional town of Emerald, Texas. All of these scenes were filmed inside the historic Harding High Schoolbuilding in Oklahoma City. In addition, scenes were filmed in the Heritage Hills neighborhood of Oklahoma City (another historic area), along with various other sites in Oklahoma City. Parts of the movie were filmed at the Stone Lion Inn in the town of Guthrie, a currently operating bed & breakfast. The scene at the Train Depot was also filmed in Guthrie, OK. The Police Department scene, including the jail cells, were filmed at the Guthrie Police Department.

== Awards and nominations ==
- 2006 - New York City Horror Film Festival
