= Einstein's God Model (film) =

- Theatrical poster
- Directed by: Philip T. Johnson
- Screenplay by: Philip T. Johnson
- Produced by: Craig Dow; Kenneth Hughes; Philip T. Johnson
- Starring: Aaron Graham; Kenneth Hughes; Brad Norman; Kirby O'Connell
- Cinematography: Mike Turano
- Edited by: Philip T. Johnson
- Music by: Senon Williams
- Production companies: Induction Productions LLC; ImageWorks Chicago Inc; Trees of Shade Inc
- Distributed by: Indie Rights Movies
- Release date: May 11, 2016 (Los Angeles)
- Running time: 88 minutes
- Country: United States
- Language: English

Einstein's God Model is a 2016 American independent science fiction film written, directed, and edited by Philip T. Johnson. It was produced by Craig Dow, Kenneth Hughes, and Philip T. Johnson.

The film was noted for its stunning visual effects, original storyline, and innovative portrayal of abstract theoretical physics. The film won multiple awards, including "Best Science" (presented by an M.I.T. professor) at the 2016 Boston Science Fiction Festival, "Best Picture" at the 2016 Comicon, and "Best Metaphysical Science" at the 2016 RAW Science Film Festival. A limited theatrical release, was followed by an international digital release, where it has since gained a cult following on major platforms.

== Plot ==
The film opens with an actual quote Thomas Edison gave during a 1920 interview with Scientific American Magazine. He stated that he was working on a device that would allow him to communicate with personalities that had passed on to another plane of existence. In 2002, graduate student Craig Leeham volunteers for a clandestine research study. Physicists Louis Mastenbrook and his mentor, Carl Meiselhoff, subject Craig to high levels of infrasound, electromagnetic fields, intravenous Ketamine, and "optical stimulation". Craig answers an old rotary phone and is shocked to hear the voice of his deceased sister (Jenny) on the other end. Meiselhoff and Mastenbrook increase the power on the equipment. Craig seizes, screams, and his eyes explode. Ten years later, at a funeral, anesthetist Brayden Taylor's story is revealed in flashbacks. After surgery, his patient thanks him for allowing her to see her deceased children. An anesthesia colleague, Bob, informs him of the study Meiselhoff did using Ketamine to mimic near death experiences. At a cemetery, Brayden's girlfriend, Abbey, doubles over with abdominal pain while creating gravestone rubbings for her artwork. Later at a dinner party, Abbey collapses in the bathroom after a miscarriage. Following emergency surgery, she flees her hospital room to walk home and is violently struck in a hit and run. Abbey sees flashes, glowing energy strings, and a pulsing ball of light. She whispers "It's very beautiful over there."

Overwhelmed with grief, Brayden becomes obsessed with trying to bring Abbey back into his life. He seeks out Meiselhoff, and the physicist's widow gives Brayden the equipment with a cryptic warning of losing your soul trying to upset the balance of nature. Brayden tries to operate the Edison gear, but lacking expertise, almost kills himself in the process. He is saved by the arrival of Louis Mastenbrook who explains that he's part of a 100 year old coalition of physicists called "The God Model Project". Their goal is to define the laws of the known universe by the end of the century. At a restaurant, Louis gives Brayden a short lesson on M-theory and how our universe sits on a giant cosmic membrane, parallel to infinite other universes. The electromagnetic field created by our brain carries our consciousness on gravitational waves to another membrane. Louis claims not only will he be able to contact Abbey's consciousness on another membrane, he'll be able to bring her back.

Louis instructs Brayden to recruit Craig Leeham, who is now blind, but has the ability to communicate with and see deceased personalities on other membranes. Craig thinks Jenny is trapped between membranes and Louis can help save her. Back at his loft, Brayden asks Louis about the God Model, and Louis relates the story of a Harvard lecture where a student asked Einstein if he believed in God.

Isolated in a closet, Craig fights to tolerate the machine. Brayden is able to contact Abbey and briefly communicates with her. During the suspenseful session, Abbey melts a bucket of rubbing wax by Brayden. Before losing consciousness, Craig reveals he saw the snowfall present at Abbey's death. Brayden postulates that, if he's put under general anesthesia, he can tolerate even greater levels of the machine and reach Abbey without fear of brain damage. He approaches Devin to join them and perform anesthesia, presenting the melted wax as evidence. Brayden is strapped into the gear and Devin induces general anesthesia. Louis cranks up the machine to the highest levels ever. Brayden briefly wakes up from the anesthesia and his consciousness makes a connection with the quantum realm that leads to another membrane. Brayden physically vanishes and finds himself in the "bulk" .. the no man's land between parallel universes. There, he briefly sees a strange figure also wearing the Edison gear. The figure vanishes and Brayden finds himself back in the loft .. but it is dark, empty. Louis and Devin pull the figure out of the isolation closet ... it is Carl Meiselhoff. Meiselhoff had crossed over trying to repair the damage he'd done to Craig's life. Louis reveals he sent Brayden over as a way to retrieve Carl. In the parallel universe, Brayden discovers Jenny, who is holding Abbey's plaster hand. Brayden tries to exit the closet, but is told he can only enter her world when the machine starts. Furious, Devin insists they rescue Brayden. Louis says it's impossible because they'd have to merge membranes. Carl states that Craig is capable of briefly getting the two membranes to occupy the same space, if he goes into his trance while connected to the machine. Craig agrees and he merges the membranes. Brayden enters the loft and is confronted by Abbey's entity (a glowing plasma sphere). Abbey physically appears to Bradyen and they are reunited. Craig himself crosses over and is reunited with Jenny. The merger collapses. Craig and Jenny are thrown into a new universe, as are Brayden and Abbey.

Epilogue reveals Brayden and Abbey in a loving embrace in their new world, Craig and Jenny in their world (as Jenny makes a rubbing of Abbey's gravestone), and Louis being interviewed about his claim that he has seen membranes ... and they are "beautiful".

== Cast ==
- Aaron Graham as Brayden Taylor
- Kirby O'Connell as Abbey Lucey
- Kenneth Hughes as Louis Mastenbrook PhD
- Brad Norman as Craig Leeham
- Darryl Warren as Carl Meiselhoff PhD
- Karol Kent as Margaret Meiselhoff
- Tiffany Scott as Donna
- Andy Hannon as Devin
- Mallory Bordonaro as Jenny Leeham
- Darren Stephens as Pastor Dave
- Mike McNamara as Minister
- Jessica Brooks as Waitress
- M.T. Cozzola as Francine (as Mary-Terese Cozzola)
- Thomas Herman as Bob
- Chris Tzoubris as Gordon LaMalfa
- Philip T. Johnson as Sean Fox

== Science and physics ==
Einstein's God Model wove a variety of theoretical physics, medical science, and historical science into the story. These include:

- String Theory
- M-Theory
- Parallel Universes
- General Anesthesia
- Infrasound (as it affects the human body and visual field)
- Electromagnetic Fields
- Ketamine (dissociative effect on the human body and "near death experiences").
- Thomas Edison's rumored prototype device for contacting other planes of existence.
- Albert Einstein's guest lecture at Harvard University where he purportedly described the God Model diagram.
- Quantum superposition
- Quantum Entanglement

== Production ==
Johnson came up with film's premise while reading The Elegant Universe by Brian Greene, inspired by Greene's "amazing" explanations of complex phenomena like String Theory and M-Theory.

Another inspiration was Mary Roach's Spook, an "exploration of research into what happens after we die," from which Johnson learned of Thomas Edison's interview with Scientific American where he claimed to be working on a device "to communicate with the departed."

The anecdote of Einstein's God Model lecture was related to Johnson by his physics professor Daniel Record, who later joined as science advisor to the film. William Rosenblatt, M.D. of Yale University served as medical advisor.

Like the protagonist, Johnson is a practicing anesthetist, currently working at Yale New Haven Hospital.

Producers include Kenneth Hughes, as well as Craig Dow of ImageWorks Chicago. The DP was Mike Turano.

=== Filming ===
The filmmakers shot in Chicago, IL during the winter.

The production was lengthy: The Chicago Film Office's list "Movies Filmed In Chicago" gives a date of 2009. The 2013 edition of Hollywood on Lake Michigan includes Einstein's God Model as one of the "Films Shot in Chicago and the Surrounding Area," giving a 2012 date.

The work/loft space was rented from West Grand Studios, who also supplied set dressing. The Chicago Film office assisted with the exterior street shots. The hospital scenes were shot at Robert Morris College's medical training facility. Exterior cemetery and chapel scenes were shot at Bohemian National Cemetery.

Johnson incorporated many vintage items, especially electronic equipment, into the film's props, expressing fondness for their look and feel. A vintage steamer trunk was procured from Craigslist; a old telephone scavanged years prior from the garbage outside an Irish pub.

=== Post-production ===
Johnson and the producers wanted the visual effects (VFX) to have a very visceral feel to offset it from the film market's heavy reliance on digital effects. After producer Kenneth Hughes brought in Erik Tillmans of DreamWorks as visual effects supervisor, the production reached a tipping point as the VFX's developed their own character arc in the story. Most of the VFX were shot analog and enhanced with minimal digital embellishment. The quantum realm and membrane effects were achieved with water tank footage and green screen compositing. The surreal snow that seems to endlessly float was crushed egg shells in baby oil. Screen Anarchy said of the editing "Keen blasts of sharply assembled insert shots and sound are standout aesthetic qualities of the movie." Producer Kenneth Hughes recruited Senon Williams of the band Dengue Fever to create the film's score. The film's sound design was created by the artists at Technicolor Sound at Paramount Pictures. Johnson stated "It wasn't until I heard the sound effects during the mix that the machine stopped being a prop and became an actual working device."

== Release ==
The film premiered at the 2016 Boston Science Fiction Film Festival. Its festival run produced multiple awards (see below) and hosted very dynamic Q&A's after each screening. Said Johnson, "The film is so science heavy, I was surprised at how many people were touched by the story on a spiritual level. We had audience members, who had suffered a recent loss, tell us that it gave them comfort." Einstein's God Model had its theatrical premiere at the Arena Cinema (Cinelounge) in Los Angeles, California.

=== Distribution ===
Einstein's God Model was distributed by Indie Rights Movies. The film has also screened in venues at Yale University, London, and Melbourne.

The film had a digital release on a variety of platforms and is available in the US, UK, Australia, Japan, and China. In 2018 the film was released on Blu-ray and DVD, both of which have director/producer/science advisor commentary, interviews, and a behind the scenes short.

== Reception ==
Einstein's God Model received praise for its ambition and imaginative visuals, though its dialogue, performances, technical qualities, and pacing were viewed less favorably.

Noel Murray of the LA Times called it an "awkward [but] engaging mind-bender... tackles grief, hope, spirituality and the unifying theory of everything." While finding the dialogue "laughable" and its performances "inconsistent," he credited the "can-do quality and a strong dose of craziness that keeps it from ever becoming boring."

Frank Sheck of The Hollywood Reporter also found the acting to "vary wildly," with Brad Norman's "charismatic turn as the bitter psychic being the standout." He noted the film's "thematic ambitions and cheeky wit," but was less fond of its "talky screenplay" and "cheesy effects," finding it "most impressive in its elaborately staged pre-credits and climactic sequences, but flounders with long tedious stretches in-between."

Like Sheck, Dana Heath of Cryptic Rock praised Norman's performance as "bitter yet humorous," saying that although he is not the protagonist, his character Leeham "is the star of the show."

ScreenAnarchy's Jim Tudor echoed the skepticism of other reviewers regarding the "off-the-shelf digital effects... laptop-rendered trickery," and noted that there were "several instances of filmmaking 101 fails. Two characters talking to one another, shot with the eye-lines completely wrong... I lost track of how many times this movie cuts away to reaction shots of a dog." He thought the film was "At times... more like a light show accenting a science lecture [than] a movie... Einstein's God Model likes to ask mysterious Big Questions; to its detriment, it more enjoys serving up answers." Despite these flaws, he deemed it "an entirely watchable curiosity with a unique drive, decent performances, and a strangely glowing soul."

In a negative review, Nerdly's Phil Wheat called the film a "mess," criticizing the acting, pacing, and heavy reliance on scientific jargon. "All that technobabble does is make the film drier than a drunk man in the desert."

A positive review from Jewish News AZ credited the film's "extraordinary heart," finding parallels between Jewish mysticism and the film's attempt to reconcile metaphysics with hard science.

== Awards ==
FESTIVAL	AWARD
2016 Boston Science Fiction Film Festival	Best Scienc
2016 Sci-Fi-London Film Festival	Official Selection
