= Time Trap (film) =

2017 film by Mark Dennis

- Directed by: Mark Dennis; Ben Foster
- Written by: Mark Dennis
- Produced by: Mark Dennis; Ben Foster
- Starring: Brianne Howey; Kassidy-Rae Turner; Olivia Draguicevich; Andrew Wilson; Reiley McClendon
- Cinematography: Mike Simpson
- Music by: Xiaotian Shi
- Production companies: Pad Thai Pictures; Filmsmith Production & Management; Rising Phoenix Casting
- Distributed by: Paladin; Broadmedia Studios; Eagle Films; Giant Interactive
- Release dates: May 19, 2017 (Seattle International Film Festival); November 2, 2018
- Running time: 95 minutes
- Country: United States
- Language: English

Time Trap is a 2017 science fiction action adventure film, directed by Ben Foster and Mark Dennis. Starring Brianne Howey, Cassidy Gifford, Olivia Draguicevich, Reiley McClendon, and Andrew Wilson. It tells the story of a group of students in a remote area of Texas searching for their missing professor. They then discover a mysterious cave by accident. While exploring the cave, the group experience a series of bizarre and dangerous events related to time and space distortion.

== Plot ==
Hopper, an archaeology professor, is exploring a remote cave system on the trail of missing hippies from the 1970s. After discovering what appears to be a cowboy paused in place in a tunnel, he returns outside to find it to be nighttime, his dog gone, car battery dead and another vehicle parked all overgrown with vegetation.

Several days later, as Hopper has not returned, Taylor and Jackie go looking for him, with their friend Cara, who brings her sister, Veeves, and her friend Furby. Following Hopper's trail to the campsite by a cave, they find an entrance with climbing ropes leading inside. They decide to follow it, but Furby chooses to stay behind as backup for the base camp. They lower themselves into the cave, hearing strange noises. When Furby does not answer their radio calls, Jackie tries to climb back out, but the rope frays, and she falls, injuring herself and Taylor. Calling for help, they receive a transmission from inside the cave and follow it.

At a different junction, they discover another opening to the cave and Furby, dead with a broken neck. Watching his video recordings, they notice several days elapsed from his perspective, while only an hour had passed in the cave. He began researching the hippies' belongings, discovering they were Hopper's parents and that they were accompanied by his sister. His parents were following legends of the Fountain of Youth and speculated that this cave system was the root of the story. Furby found another cave opening. After several days, he went into the cave to retrieve keys for a vehicle but fell when his rope severed.

Taylor deduces the cave is inside a time distortion where events move more slowly. With few options, Cara free-climbs out of the cave to get a GPS signal. Outside, the terrain has become barren, and there is no signal. Returning to the cave, comparing video recordings, Cara has experienced about thirty minutes on the surface while she had been gone at most a few seconds from the others' viewpoint, confirming Taylor's theory. Reviewing Furby's footage again, they learn that he survived the fall but was murdered by a caveman. Cara and Taylor deduce the time difference is much more drastic than they suspected and entire years are passing within seconds, meaning the few hours they have been in the cave is enough to span several thousand years outside.

Hearing more howling, Cara prepares to climb out again for help but is interrupted by a futuristic 8-foot-tall humanoid spaceman descending via a retractable ladder. A caveman suddenly attacks, but is subdued non-lethally. They flee just to find a whole tribe of cavemen inspecting the dead bodies of the cowboy and Hopper's parents. Discovered, Taylor fights the cavemen and is killed. The spaceman returns, protects the others from the cavemen, and then places Taylor into a healing pool of water. More cavemen attack, and the spaceman is exposed to the air in the caves, which is toxic to him. Dying, he shows the students several media clips about their disappearance and indicating that humans have left a dying Earth, resettling (and evolving) on Mars.

Taylor finds Hopper injured in front of another time dilation, containing his sister, a legion of conquistadors and a cavemen horde virtually frozen in the midst of a battle over control of a waterfall, the source of the time distortion. Hopper explains the field is strongest here, making rescue of his sister impossible; he tells Taylor to go and save the others, as he is also dying. Preparing to leave the cave with the spaceman's ladder, the students are attacked by cavemen before they can get through; Cara is grabbed and pulled through the portal before she can help her friends. From their perspective, she instantly reappears through the portal, futuristically dressed and with tentacle-like mechanisms which pull her friends through.

A short time later, Furby awakens, along with Hopper and Hopper's family, all having been retrieved and resurrected with the healing waters. The others arrive, happily explaining they are in a space station and have a lot to talk about.

== Cast ==
- Reiley McClendon as Taylor
- Cassidy Gifford as Cara
- Brianne Howey as Jackie
- Olivia Draguicevich as Veeves
- Max Wright as Furby
- Andrew Wilson as Hopper

== Production ==
The film was initially conceived as found footage. Shooting took place in Texas. Co-director Mark Dennis cited 1980s films, such as the Indiana Jones films and The Goonies, as an inspiration, in particular those films' focus on practical effects, characters, and plot. Setting the film in a cave came from both growing up in Texas, where caves are plentiful, and from The Descent. The premise came from a four-year-long trip to the South Pole that Dennis took. When he returned to the United States several years later after having been out of touch with his friends, he was surprised by how much had changed.

== Release ==
Time Trap premiered at the Seattle International Film Festival on May 19, 2017. It was released to video on demand on November 13, 2018.

== Reception ==
On the review aggregator website Rotten Tomatoes, 67% of 12 critics' reviews are positive, with an average rating of 6.3/10. Metacritic, which uses a weighted average, assigned the film a score of 45 out of 100, based on 4 critics, indicating "mixed or average" reviews.

Gary Goldstein of the Los Angeles Times described the film as "a handful of intriguing ideas in search of a more cohesive and dimensional narrative". Though labeling it a good film, Roman Morales of Ain't It Cool News wrote that the film's pacing and excessive exposition keep it from being great. Danielle White of the Austin Chronicle gave the film one and half stars out of five, commenting, "If anything, there’s wasted potential with the plot and story development. And, of course, some logistical points that don’t make sense. But it’s also really short. Most films that traffic in such heady subjects are, like, three hours long. An anxiety-ridden contemplation on history and mortality simply needs more time."

== See also ==
- List of films featuring space stations
- Time travel in fiction
- Ashabul Kahfi
