= Glen Jensen =

American actor and stand-up comedian (born 1953)

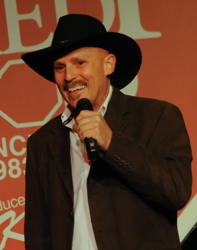
- Glen Jensen performing in Las Vegas, Nevada.
- Born: Glen Jensen; March 24, 1953 (age 73); Virginia, Minnesota, United States
- Occupations: Actor, stand-up comedian, spokesperson
- Years active: 1995–present

Glen Jensen (born March 24, 1953) is an American actor and stand-up comedian.

Glen started out performing at various comedy clubs in Philadelphia, New Jersey and New York City. In 2001, Jensen became a finalist in the Boston Comedy and Film Festival, and in 2003 he went on to win the Philly's Funniest Comedy Competition. This led to an appearance on the TV show "Comedy Show 'N Tell" shot in Las Vegas, Nevada as well as "Comedy at Club 54" in Toronto, Ontario, Canada. Glen began appearing as an opening act for the Doobie Brothers, Spyro Gyra and Al Jarreau. A regular performer in Las Vegas and Atlantic City, New Jersey, his work on the comedy stage can be seen at The Improv, The Funny Bone and Catch a Rising Star.

After achieving a strong measure of success with stand-up comedy, Glen decided to throw his hat in the ring as an actor. He played the role of Kowalski in the supernatural slasher film Fingerprints, sharing the screen with Lou Diamond Phillips, Leah Pipes, Geoffrey Lewis, Sally Kirkland, and Kristin Cavallari. Fingerprints went on to win the Best Feature Film award in the New York City Horror Film Festival. He is known for his role as General Jernigan in Denizen, directed by the newly anointed "Female Roger Corman", J.A. Steel. He received the "Best Actor in a Feature Film" Honorable Mention at the world premier of Denizen at the Bare Bones Film Festival.

== Filmography ==
Year	Film	Role	Director
2010	Denizen	General Jernigen	J.A. Steel
2009	The Mercy Man	Russian Gangster	Rider McDowell
2009	Bamboo Sharks	Mobster	Dennis Ward
2008	Placebo	John	Keith Feighan
2007	Salvation	Sheriff Dade	J.A. Steel
2006	Fingerprints	Kowalski	Harry Basil
2006	The Forensic Files	Lead Detective	Paul Dowling

== Comedy recordings ==
- "Homespun Tales with an Urban Edge" (CD) (August 22, 2003)
- "The New Rascal's Comedy Hour" (March 18, 2006)
