= Austin School of Film =

Cinema training institution in Texas

The Austin School of Film, also known as The Austin School of Film @ Motion Media Arts Center, is an art, film and technology institute through non-profit, Motion Media Arts Center and is located in East Austin. The Austin School of Film began its start in 2002 under the non-profit umbrella name of Motion Media Arts Center and by merging of the Austin Cinemaker Co-op (founded 1996) and the Center for Young Cinema (founded 1999). The goal of the school is to educate, train, and develop emerging artists of all ages to be active participants in shaping our culture. The organization's program spans the entire spectrum of art, film and tech offering a range of classes from filmmaking, coding, web and graphic design, animation, digital media arts production to software training and Apple certification. They also offer certificate programs such as Digital Video Certificate Program, to help students develop technical skills in production and post-production and complete a series of courses to develop a filmmaking knowledge base.

As of 2011, The Austin School of Film offers a membership program, private art studios, communal workspace, equipment rentals, and production space for the local community in addition to 500 classes and workshops year round.

== Notable alumni ==
Ben Foster's movie Strings was shown at the 2011 Breckenridge Film Festival. Other alumni have attended programs at AFI, Cal Arts, Chapman, NYU, and Tisch School of Design.
