= Cassidy Gifford =

American actress (born 1993)

- Born: Cassidy Erin Gifford; August 2, 1993 (age 33); New York City, U.S.
- Occupation: Actress
- Years active: 2005–present
- Spouse: Ben Wierda (m. 2020)
- Children: 2
- Parents: Frank Gifford (father); Kathie Lee Gifford (mother)

Cassidy Erin Gifford (born August 2, 1993) is an American actress. She co-starred with Wyatt Nash in the 2017 film Like Cats and Dogs, and appears as Reagan Baxter in the drama series The Baxters.

== Early life ==
Cassidy Erin Gifford was born on August 2, 1993, in Greenwich, Connecticut, to former American football player Frank Gifford (1930-2015) and American television host Kathie Lee Gifford.

== Career ==
Gifford's early acting career includes an appearance on an episode of That's So Raven in 2005. In 2015 she was cast in Jason Blum's supernatural horror film The Gallows. She co-starred with Wyatt Nash in the 2017 Hallmark Channel film Like Cats and Dogs. The same year, she appeared as Minnie in the movie Ten: Murder Island (which is based on the novel Ten by Gretchen McNeil), and was cast as Cara in the sci-fi adventure movie Time Trap.

Gifford appears as Reagan Decker in the drama series The Baxters; the series is based on Karen Kingsbury's Redemption book series.

== Personal life ==
She is the younger sister of Cody Gifford, and younger half-sister of Kyle Gifford, Jeff Gifford, and Victoria Gifford Kennedy from her father's first marriage. In June 2020, she married Ben Wierda, nephew of Betsy DeVos and Erik Prince and grandson of Edgar Prince, in a private ceremony in Michigan. Gifford and Wierda have a son, who was born in June 2023, and a daughter, who was born in June 2025.

In 2015, she was chosen as one of Esquire magazine's "18 Beautiful Women America Won't Be Able to Resist This Summer."

== Filmography ==
=== Film ===
Year	Title	Role	Notes
2011	Adventures of Serial Buddies	Hannah	
2014	God's Not Dead	Kara	
2015	The Gallows	Cassidy Spilker	
2016	Caged No More	Skye	
2016	Twisted Sisters	Daisy	a.k.a. Sorority Nightmare
2017	Time Trap	Cara	
2017	Ten: Murder Island	Minnie	

=== Television ===
Year	Title	Role	Notes
2005	That's So Raven	Jamie	Episode: "Dog Day After-Groom"
2010	The Suite Life on Deck	Kate	Episode: "Model Behavior"
2011	Blue Bloods	Mandy	Episode: "Mercy"
2017	Like Cats and Dogs	Laura Haley	TV movie
2017	The Detour	Hannah	Episode: "The Club"
2024	The Baxters	Reagan Decker	Main cast
