= List of Mobile Suit Gundam: The Origin episodes =

Mobile Suit Gundam: The Origin is an anime OVA series by Sunrise, adapted from the manga of the same title by Yoshikazu Yasuhiko. It focuses on the stories of Casval Rem Deikun (more famously known as Char Aznable) and his sister Artesia (aka Sayla Mass).

Sunrise announced in June 2011 that an anime adaptation of Gundam The Origin was in production. In March 2014, it was announced it will be a four-episode OVA series with event screenings at Japanese theaters, in celebration of the 35th anniversary of Gundam, and centering on the stories of Casval Deikun and his sister Artesia. The first episode, titled The Blue-Eyed Casval (青い瞳のキャスバル, Aoi Hitomi no Kyasubaru), premiered in limited Japanese theaters on February 28, 2015. Sunrise produced an English dub recorded at NYAV Post for the first time since Bandai retired their Gundam license. Another two-episode OVA series, Mobile Suit Gundam The Origin: Loum Arc, was released in 2017 and 2018.

A 13-episode television recompilation of the OVA series aired from April 29 to August 12, 2019. On May 25, 2019, it was announced that the English dub of The Origin TV recompilation would make its television broadcast premiere on Adult Swim's Toonami programming block on July 7, 2019. (Note: Adult Swim lists the series as premiering on July 6, 2019 at 3 a.m. EST/PST, which is effectively July 7.) Sugizo produced the theme songs. His band Luna Sea performed the three opening themes, the first being "Sora no Uta ~Higher and Higher~" (宇宙(そら)の詩(うた) ～Higher and Higher～). For the ending themes he decided to collaborate with female singers. The first ending theme is a cover of Daisuke Inoue's "Meguriai" (めぐりあい), the theme song of 1982's Mobile Suit Gundam III: Encounters in Space, by Sugizo feat. Glim Spanky. The other three ending themes feature Aina the End from BiSH, KOM_I from Wednesday Campanella, and miwa.

== Episode list ==
=== Mobile Suit Gundam: The Origin ===
| No. | Title | Release date |
|---|---|---|
| 1 | "I: Blue Eyed Casval" "I Aoi Hitomi no Kyasubaru" (I 青い瞳のキャスバル) | February 28, 2015 |
U.C. 0068 - While giving his speech to declare the Autonomous Republic of Munzo's independence from the Earth Federation, Zeon Zum Deikun suddenly dies of a heart attack. This causes mass riots in the colony against the Federation while Degwin Sodo Zabi, Deikun's deputy, rises to power. In the midst of the chaos, Deikun's children Casval and Artesia, along with Artesia's pet cat Lucifer and Deikun's old friend Jimba Ral, stow away aboard a cargo ship headed for Earth to escape from the Zabi regime. Episode 1's theme song is Hoshikuzu no Sunadokei (星屑の砂時計, lit. "Stardust Hourglass") by Takayuki Hattori featuring Yu-yu.
| 2 | "II: Artesia's Sorrow" "II Kanashimi no Aruteishia" (II 哀しみのアルテイシア) | October 31, 2015 |
Three years have passed since Casval, Artesia and Jimba fled to Earth and sought refuge in the castle of Don Teabolo Mass, an aristocrat and trusted friend of the Deikuns, in Andalusia, Spain; Teabolo adopts the children and renames them Édouard and Sayla, respectively. After Jimba is killed in an assassination attack by mercenaries hired by Kycilia Zabi, the Yashima Group, whose president is a good friend of Teabolo, offers to relocate an injured Teabolo and the children to Texas Colony at Side 5: Loum. Upon their arrival, the children meet Char Aznable, who bears a striking resemblance to Édouard. Tragedy strikes the children when they receive word that their mother Astraia has died. After Lucifer dies, Édouard bids farewell to Sayla before heading to the Loum military academy. Meanwhile, Dozle Zabi invites Ramba Ral to participate in a top secret development project that will change the face of Zeon's military forever. Episode 2's theme song is Kaze yo 0074 (風よ 0074, lit. "Wind of 0074") by Takayuki Hattori featuring Takumi Ishida.
| 3 | "III: Dawn of Rebellion" "III Akatsuki no Hōki" (III 暁の蜂起) | May 21, 2016 |
Following a security issue at the spaceport involving an antique gun inside Char's suitcase, Édouard and Char switch their clothes and Char boards Édouard's flight, which is sabotaged by Zeon forces. Having faked his death at the cost of his friend, Édouard assumes the identity of Char and undergoes training as a Zeon cadet. During training, Char befriends a young Garma Zabi. Two years later, a Federation ship disobeys orders from Zeon's traffic control and inadvertently crashes into and destroys an agricultural block, enraging the Zeon colonists and sparking open rebellion. Seizing this chance, Char convinces Garma to lead their fellow cadets on a daring night attack against the local Federation garrison, completely overwhelming them and forcing their surrender. Meanwhile, Gihren Zabi orders the cancellation of the MS Project due to a lack of progress, but Professor Torenov Y. Minovsky convinces him to resume the project after discovering a technological breakthrough. Elsewhere, a young Amuro Ray arrives at Side 7 with his father. Episode 3's theme song is Towa no Astraea (永遠(とわ)のAstraea, lit. "Eternal Astraea") by Ko Shibasaki.
| 4 | "IV: Eve of Destiny" "IV Unmei no Zen'ya" (IV 運命の前夜) | November 19, 2016 |
Following the success of the Dawn Rebellion, Degwin negotiates with Vice Admiral Revil for the complete withdrawal of Federation forces from Side 3 to prevent similar incidents from happening again. After being reprimanded by Degwin for failing to look after Garma, Dozle sends Char - who motivated Garma into starting the rebellion - to Earth; in response, Char requests to become a mobile suit pilot when he returns. In the Earth city of Manaus, Char lands a job as a mobile worker pilot at Jaburo. During his stay, he meets a young Lalah Sune and rescues her from the men who had been trafficking her. Meanwhile, Tem Rey learns of the advancement of Zeon's MS Project and of Professor Minovsky's sudden defection to the Federation. However, on his way to Von Braun, Minovsky is killed during a battle between Ramba Ral's mobile suit squadron and the Federation's new but inefficient RCX-76 Guncannon units. Following the incident, Tem presents his RX-78 Project to Anaheim Electronics as a more effective solution to Zeon's mobile suits. On October 24, U.C. 0078, the Republic of Zeon transitions into a principality and declares its independence from the Federation while the Federation proceeds to move its main headquarters to Jaburo. At Side 7, Amuro discovers his father's project and begins to study it. On January 3, U.C. 0079, the Principality of Zeon declares war on the Federation, thus marking the start of the One Year War. Episode 4's theme song is Sora no Kanata de (宇宙(そら)の彼方で, lit. "On the Other Side of Space") by Hiroko Moriguchi.
| 5 | "V: Clash at Loum" "V Gekitotsu Rūmu Kaisen" (V 激突 ルウム会戦) | September 2, 2017 |
On January 3, U.C. 0079, the Principality of Zeon declares war on the Earth Federation and massacres the anti-Zeon government of Side 2 "Hatte". At the same time, a mobile suit assault force led by Kycila captures the moon cities of Granada and Von Braun. One week later, Zeon gasses the entire population of the Island Iffish colony and sends it on a freefall towards the Federation's capital of Jaburo. On January 16, the colony separates into three components upon atmospheric entry and destroys southeastern Australia, southwestern Canada, and most of East Asia, resulting in half of the world's population being wiped out. Days later, at the Side 5 "Loum" colony of Miranda, Sayla is informed by Zeon spy Tachi O'Hara that Casval is still alive. When the Texas colony is attacked by anti-Zeon bandits, Sayla has the surviving villagers barricade the Mass family home and stand their ground, but Teabolo dies during the siege. The ordeal ends when Zeon destroys Miranda's bay areas and Sayla sees Char's red Zaku II from a distance. As both forces engage in a naval battle, Char pushes his Zaku II's limits to break through the Federation's fleet, earning his infamous nickname "The Red Comet". Episode 5's theme song is I Can't Do Anything -Sora yo- (I CAN'T DO ANYTHING -宇宙(そら)よ-) by Takayuki Hattori featuring AYA.
| 6 | "VI: Rise of the Red Comet" "VI Tanjō Akai Suisei" (VI 誕生 赤い彗星) | May 5, 2018 |
On January 23, U.C. 0079, the Earth Federation and Zeon forces engage in a fierce naval battle at Loum. Dozle redirects his fleet away from the main battlefield to corner the Revil fleet. Char launches a surprise attack on the Revil fleet on his own before the Dozle fleet arrives and massacres the Federation forces. The Black Tri-Stars lay siege on the flagship Ananke before taking Admiral Revil prisoner. The next day, as the citizens of Zeon celebrate their victory, a political rift forms between Degwin and Gihren. As Zeon forces continue to sweep away pockets of resistance at Loum, Kycilia assigns Lt. Gen. M'quve to lead the Earth Invasion Force, with Garma serving under his command. Meanwhile, Dozle gives Char the task of investigating the Federation's new mobile suit project codenamed "Operation V". Revil is sprung out of the POW compound by Kycilia's spies acting as Federation officers as a means to prolong the war. In Side 7, Amuro confronts Federation officer William Kemp over the Gundam project, but is warned not to talk about it and all of his father's documents are confiscated. Meanwhile, Sayla is reassigned to Side 7 to continue her medical career. In Scott City, Antarctica, as both forces prepare to sign a cease-fire agreement, Revil broadcasts his speech announcing that Zeon has exhausted its resources and urging the Federation to continue the fight. Elsewhere, the new Pegasus-class ship White Base is en route to Side 7 to take delivery of the Gundam. Episode 6's theme song is Hasen no Namida (破線の涙, lit. "Dotted Line Tears") by Masayoshi Yamazaki.

=== Mobile Suit Gundam: The Origin – Advent of the Red Comet ===
| No. | Title (Note: All English episode titles taken from Crunchyroll.) | Original release date | English air date |
|---|---|---|---|
| 1 | "Child of Zeon"; Transliteration: "Jion no Ko" (Japanese: ジオンの子) | April 29, 2019 | July 7, 2019 |
| 2 | "A Promise with Mother"; Transliteration: "Haha to no Yakusoku" (Japanese: 母との約束) | May 6, 2019 | July 14, 2019 |
| 3 | "Édouard and Sayla"; Transliteration: "Edowau to Seira" (Japanese: エドワウとセイラ) | May 13, 2019 | July 21, 2019 |
| 4 | "Goodbye, Artesia"; Transliteration: "Sayonara Aruteishia" (Japanese: さよならアルテイシア) | May 20, 2019 | July 28, 2019 |
| 5 | "Char and Garma"; Transliteration: "Shā to Garuma" (Japanese: シャアとガルマ) | May 27, 2019 | August 4, 2019 |
| 6 | "Garma Rises"; Transliteration: "Garuma Tatsu" (Japanese: ガルマ立つ) | June 3, 2019 | August 11, 2019 |
| 7 | "Meeting Lalah"; Transliteration: "Rara~a to no Deai" (Japanese: ララァとの出会い) | June 10, 2019 | August 18, 2019 |
| 8 | "The Principality Of Zeon Declares Its Independence"; Transliteration: "Jion Kōkoku Kokuritsu" (Japanese: ジオン公国独立) | June 17, 2019 | August 25, 2019 |
| 9 | "Dropping the Colony"; Transliteration: "Koronī Otoshi" (Japanese: コロニー落とし) | June 24, 2019 | September 1, 2019 |
| 10 | "A Red Mobile Suit"; Transliteration: "Akai Mobiru Sūtsu" (Japanese: 赤いモビルスーツ) | July 1, 2019 | September 8, 2019 |
| 11 | "The Battle of Loum"; Transliteration: "Rūmu Kaisen" (Japanese: ルウム会戦) | July 29, 2019 | September 15, 2019 |
| 12 | "Char, The Red Comet"; Transliteration: "Akai Suisei no Shā" (Japanese: 赤い彗星のシャア) | August 5, 2019 | September 22, 2019 |
| 13 | "The One Year War"; Transliteration: "Ichinen Sensō" (Japanese: 一年戦争) | August 12, 2019 | October 6, 2019 |
