= Denizen (film) =

- Theatrical poster
- Directed by: J.A. Steel
- Written by: J.A. Steel
- Produced by: J.A. Steel; Jessica M. Bair; Christian K. Koch
- Starring: J.A. Steel; Julie Corgill; Ben Bayless; Glen Jensen; Dominique Storni
- Cinematography: Hartley Powell
- Edited by: Wayne Rawley; J.A. Steel
- Production companies: Tunis Productions; Warrior Entertainment
- Distributed by: IndieFlix
- Release date: April 10, 2010
- Running time: 83 minutes
- Country: United States
- Language: English
- Budget: $20,000

Denizen is a 2010 low-budget sci-fi horror-action film written and directed by J.A. Steel (also known as Jacquelyn A. Ruffner). The film stars Steel, Julie Corgill, Glen Jensen, Ben Bayless, and Jody Mullins, and is Steel's third feature film.

== Plot ==
A group of scientists must stop a mysterious creature from attacking a small town. Sierra Deacon's (J.A. Steel) team, consisting of Dexter Maines (Ben Bayless) and Dallas Murphy (Jody Mullins), must help the locals led by Callie Calhoun (Julie Lisandro) in saving the town from the creature that is killing the residents. After several deaths, a special Army Unit, led by General Jernigan (Glen Jensen), is called in to contain the creature, and if necessary, destroy the town. It becomes a race against time to stop the creature and prevent the town from being destroyed.

== Cast ==
- J.A. Steel as Sierra Deacon
- Julie Corgill Lisciandro as Callie (as Julie Lisandro)
- Ben Bayless as Dexter Maines
- Glen Jensen as General Jernigan
- Jody Mullins as Dallas Murphy
- Dianne Sullivan as PFC Noyce
- Janet Mayson as Mayor Greenwell
- Dominique Storni as General Ezekiel ‘Zeke’ Deacon
- Jessica M. Bair as Young Deacon's Mother
- Christina Mahan as Sheriff Hannigan (as Christina Castro)
- Scott Carnahan as Jackson ‘Jake’ Deacon
- Hilary Delgado as Maggie Deacon
- Jennifer Lea Turner as Lilly Maines

== Production ==
Production began in April 2008, in Muskogee, Oklahoma and filming was completed in nine days, with principle filming taking place primarily in Muskogee, the Cenotes of Playa del Carmen, Mexico, and in Salt Lake City, Utah. Steel brought back her tough motorcycle-riding character from The Third Society in the form of 'Sierra Deacon'.

In her personal life, Steel races motorcycles, skydives, handles swords, competes in Muay Thai kickboxing, is a Master SCUBA Diver, and holds 22 marksmanship awards with various weapons, so in several cave diving scenes, Steel did her own stunts as well as some camera work.

The film includes a transgender supporting character of General 'Zeke' Deacon, the father of Sierra Deacon, played by trans woman actress and activist Dominique Storni.

== Recognition ==
A Denizen trailer screened at the Park City Music Film Festival in 2009, and when the Denizen film premiered at the Bare Bones International Film Festival in April 2010, it received a nomination for the 'Best Sci-Fi Feature'. Denizen also was the only film to screen at the LGBT 'Outlantacon Sci-Fi Convention'.

Director and producer Jessica M. Bair won the 2009 Nevada Film Festival's 'Silver Screen Award' in the Short Film Competition, for the behind the scenes documentary Denizen: Special Access J.A. Steel. The short film was shot during the post-production of the Denizen feature, with director J.A. Steel and sound editor Wayne Rawley providing a close-up view into the filmmaker who does her own stunts.

In June 2010, Denizen was awarded the bronze medal for Excellence Award for the 'Best Impact of Music in a Feature Film', at the Park City Music Film Festival.

=== Critical response ===
The film has received attention for genre reviewers. From the movie trailer in 2008, Cinema Fantastique (Belgium) noted that the cast is typical for a low-budget production, and that the effects for the creature may well make the viewer laugh.

Mike Catalano of JoBlo wrote "We have ourselves another low-budget, fromage-fest of horror coming our way. (In case you didn’t know, fromage means “cheese” in French)", offering "at the very least, it could make for some check-your-brain-at-the-door fun", and summarized by writing "there is an abundance of hot ladies in the cast, including a special appearance by none other than horror’s #1 vixen, Tiffany Shepis."

Nic Brown of B Movie Man wrote that [the film] "is a mix of action, horror and science fiction. It has plenty of gun play and a surprising array of stunts including deep water scuba shoots, sky diving, and some military fighter action," with "an array of interesting characters," and concluded that it was "a respectable independent action film with elements of sci-fi and horror thrown in."

Nic Baisley of Film Snobbery wrote "The fairly wide variety of locations used in the movie also add that sense of realism to the story that is generally left out in some films. The use of multiple locations adds a lot of free production value to an otherwise obviously low-budget film. Other things in this film that should be given kudos are the action scenes, underwater filmed scenes, and even an unexpected aerial skydiving scene. J.A. Steel definitely knew how to take advantage of her limited budget on this shoot, and it certainly all ends up on the screen." and observed "All in all I can appreciate what Steel was trying to accomplish with 'Denizen'. I think that the overall broadness of a story like this is very hard to contain within a small-ish budget with an inexperienced cast and crew. With J.A.'s background as a martial artist you can definitely tell she shouldered a lot of the action scene burdens, as well as being in front of the camera for her role in the movie. When a director has to work in so many capacities, often the production suffers a little. At the end, 'Denizen' is a fun monster movie, despite any flaws that are inherent to it's [sic] production."

Scott Shoyer of Anything Horror praised the film's ambitious scope, campy dialogue and for not taking itself to seriously, but criticized the sound quality. Shoyer compared Denizen to films used by the television show Mystery Science Theater 3000 due to its low-budget special effects and continuity errors. Shoyer concluded by saying that the film was not for everyone, but "if you're looking for some fun cinematic cheese done “indie-style” then you'll enjoy this one. This is perfect to watch with a group of people and a lot of beer."

The horror film website Fatally Yours gave the film a negative review. While praising J.A. Steele's performance as the only pleasurable part of the movie it states that it is "atrocious" and "nigh unwatchable" due to poor acting and editing.

== DVD release ==
The Denizen film DVD was officially released via IndieFlix on April 6, 2010. It was simultaneously released as streaming video on demand. On June 7, 2010, Denizen was released on Amazon.com, in both DVD and video on demand.
