= Kenny Hughes =

American film director

Kenneth Hughes is an actor, dancer, director and writer working in film, TV and stage internationally.

== Biography ==
Kenneth Hughes had films in Cannes, Sundance, and taught at CalArts. He has danced and acted in everything from A-list features to street theater and guerilla film groups. His directing and producing has spanned every form from feature films, commercials, music videos, to live events and stage. He recently started Unified Everything Project (501c3 Nonprofit) to bring the arts and sciences together for great spectacle and enriching of audience and creators alike. He is author of a kids book series: Wee Charles. Hughes has even competed internationally stunt riding on horses (Vaulting), played professional dodgeball, and sung in the California Boys Choir conducted by Zubin Mehta with the L.A. Philharmonic. He has a pilot's license, Cinema degree, Equine Science degree and a law degree.

== Directed and/or Produced ==
Kenneth Hughes has a long history of producing/directing anti-studio feature films and many other projects live and media based. He started his career as a performing artist and has performed in film, radio, television and theater. His latest feature films won Best Feature at Comicon Einsteins God Model. His feature based on the novel by Tony DuShane and directed by Eric Stoltz was due out 2017. His debut award-winning feature film: Bad Dog and Superhero, an underground musical released in 2012 starring Christian Hoff. His genre bending vampire musical feature film Vampire Burt's Serenade, starring Kevin Richardson, Diva Zappa and Brian Gaskill was released 2020. He also produced Fell, Jumped or Pushed.

He also directed the short online video The Tapster. He directed The Donkey Punch, produced by Anthony Russo.
