= The White Sands International Film Festival =

Coordinates: 32.308975°N 106.74335°W

The White Sands International Film Festival (WSIFF) started in Alamogordo, New Mexico, as a week long event in March 2008 to showcases narrative and documentary films. The festival was created to support the work of Hispanic and New Mexican Filmmakers. The festival moved to Las Cruces, New Mexico, in 2009.

The festival originated in Alamogordo, New Mexico and moved to Las Cruces, New Mexico in 2009.

The White Sands International Film Festival was established by former Alamogordo Film Liaison Joan Griggs, Otero County Economic Development Director Ed Carr and Kathleen Curtis. The inaugural event including guests such as casting director Donn Finn, filmmaker David Gibbons and writer Sam Smiley.

"The White Sands International Film Festival" has taken place in late August or early September each year since relocating to Las Cruces. Among many recognized films by regional and international filmmakers, the festival has hosted many celebrities over the years such as Val Kilmer, Lou Diamond Phillips, Jeffery Tambor, Mark Medoff, Chris McDonald and Linda Hamilton. In 2013, a "48-Hour Film Frenzy" was added to the event to challenge filmmakers to write, cast, shoot and edit a short film in under 48 hours. The 2014 "White Sands International Film Festival" was scheduled for September 3–7, 2014.

In 2015 the organizers of the festival decided to discontinue the festival citing there was not enough of an audience for it to continue. However, an offshoot of that festival, taking place in nearby Las Cruces, New Mexico and sponsored by the New Mexico State University College of Arts and Sciences is scheduled for March 2016 and featuring celebrities such as local screenwriter and Academy Award winner Mark Medoff, as well as Danny Trejo and Alvaro Rodriguez.
