= J.A. Steel =

American actress

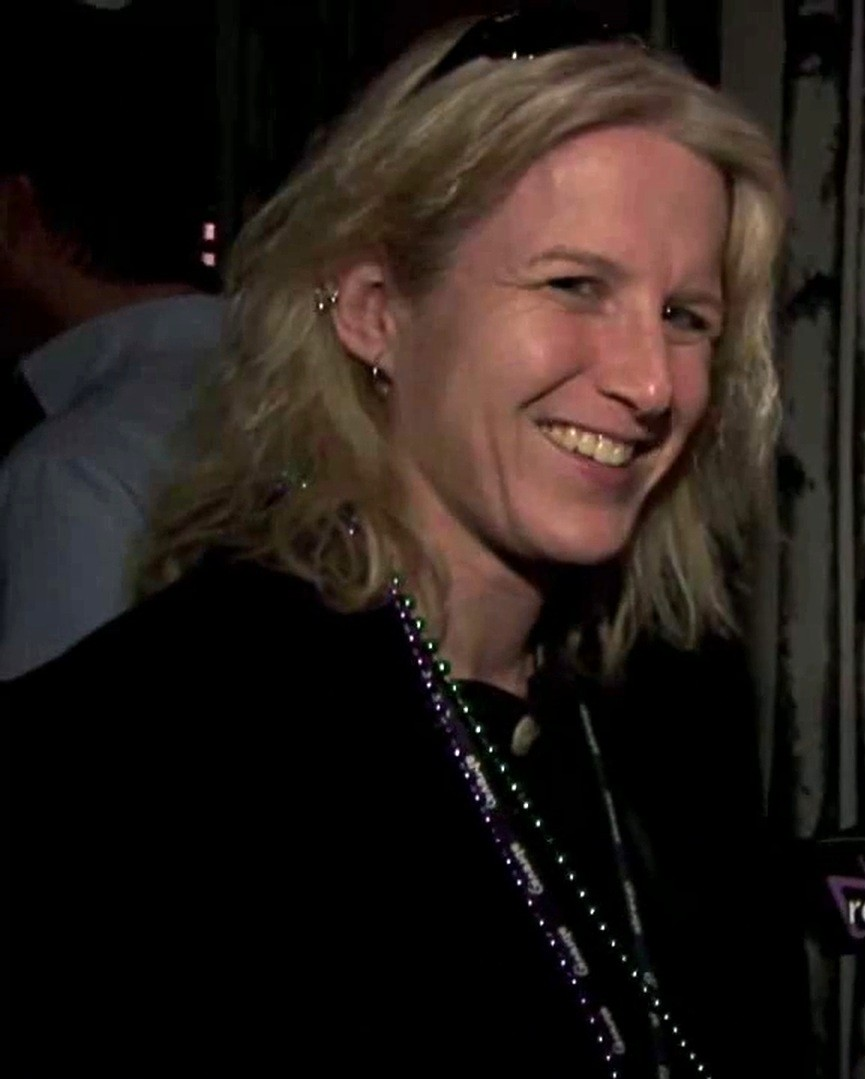
- Steel in 2009
- Born: Jacquelyn A. Ruffner; December 12, 1969 (age 55); Greensburg, Pennsylvania, U.S.
- Occupation(s): Film actress, screenwriter, director, producer
- Years active: 2000–present

J.A. Steel (born December 12, 1969) is an American writer, director, producer, editor, stunt person and actress best known for her role as C. Alexandra Jones in The Third Society.

Steel was born Jacquelyn A. Ruffner in Greensburg, Pennsylvania and raised in Harrison City. Her acting began at age seven when she appeared in numerous school plays (most which she had written) and continued until she received a scholarship of a summer theatre program at age 14.

== Early career ==
Steel's career in the entertainment industry began at the age of 18 when she began managing bands and promoting rock shows, during the time she was attending the USC School of Cinematic Arts on a partial scholarship, and graduated from USC in 1992 with a degree in social science and communications. Shortly after graduating, she accepted a job as a production assistant for martial arts action star Sho Kosugi (Revenge of the Ninja, Black Eagle) Sho promoted her to vice-president development within six months.

In early 1993, Steel left Sho Productions to start her own company, Warrior Entertainment. The company's main focus was on music management and in 1995, Steel negotiated the first contract ever between an American artist, Sasha Alexeev, and a Taiwanese record company, Rock Records. Alexeev's album, Wintertales, was released in 1996, as Asia's economy was on the verge of collapse, and record sales were slow.

== The Third Society ==
During her two-year hiatus, Steel traveled extensively in Asia and even lived for a brief time in Singapore. Upon her return to the United States, she re-entered the entertainment industry and began planning her first feature from a screenplay that she had written in 1996. The screenplay, entitled Triad, was about an ex-motorcycle racer turned cop Cody Reynolds and his Asian partner, Michael Li. Cody's girlfriend in the film was a vice-detective by the name of Sanchez.

Steel sent out the script, but development executives claimed it was "too ethnic." Sanchez became Jones. The executives were still not satisfied and wanted even more changes. In protest, Steel got rid of Cody's character completely and changed the Los Angeles Police Department captain from the 50-year-old male stereotype to an African-American woman played by Sonya Eddy. Jones became the main character, the film title changed; and The Third Society was made. She turned down several offers to buy the script, and produced 85% of the film herself.

Steel found herself both in front of and behind the camera writing, directing, producing, editing and starring in the film. She adopted the name J.A. Steel to direct, write and edit under. The "Jones" character in the final cut of The Third Society went uncredited, as Steel never originally intended to play the "Jones" character. Steel was one of the first female directors who has written a nude scene for herself, as Jones spent a lot of time in the shower to wash away the grime from the fight scenes.

== Stunts and filmmaking ==
Steel races motorcycles, skydives, handles swords, competes in muay Thai kickboxing, is a Master Scuba Diver, and holds 22 marksmanship awards with various weapons. She spent two years in Army ROTC.

Steel went on to write, produce, direct, edit, perform stunts and star in two more action feature films: the award-winning Salvation in 2007 and Denizen. Steel also directed the short films Dive the Deep Blue and A Change of Plans. Salvation was shot using an Arriflex super 16mm camera.

Steel tapped into her music roots to write the song Angel Tonight for the soundtrack of The Third Society; and direct the music videos for Doesn't Matter Anyway and It's a Beautiful Day, both by the Emily O'Neary Band for The Third Society. She also collaborated with Edith Fung to create the music for the soundtrack of Dive the Deep Blue. Her third film Denizen was released in April 2010.

== Filmography ==
Year	Title	Role	Character	Note
2002	The Third Society	Director, Writer, Producer, Actress, Editor, Stunts, Soundtrack	C. Alexandra Jones	Feature Film
2005	Cerebral Print: The Secret Files	Actress	Sexy Bounty Hunter	Short Film
	Cerebral Print: End Game	Actress	Sexy Bounty Hunter	Short Film
2006	Dive the Deep Blue	Director, Writer, Producer, Editor, Actress	Self	Short Documentary
2007	Salvation	Director, Writer, Producer, Editor, Actress, Stunts & Fight Choreographer	Gabriel	Feature Film
2009	A Change of Plans	Director, Editor, Story	N/A	Short Film
	Denizen: Special Access JA Steel	Actress	Self	Short Documentary
2010	Denizen	Director, Writer, Producer, Editor, Actress, Stunts & Fight Choreographer	Sierra Deacon	Feature Film
	Dive the Deep Blue: Tiburon	Director, Writer, Producer, Editor, Actress	Self	Short Documentary
	S.C.A.A.R. 1.5	Director, Writer, Producer, Editor, Actress	Sierra Deacon	Short Video
2012	Blood Fare	Director, Writer, Producer, Editor, Actress	Charon	Feature Film
