= Mark Dennis (director) =

American film director

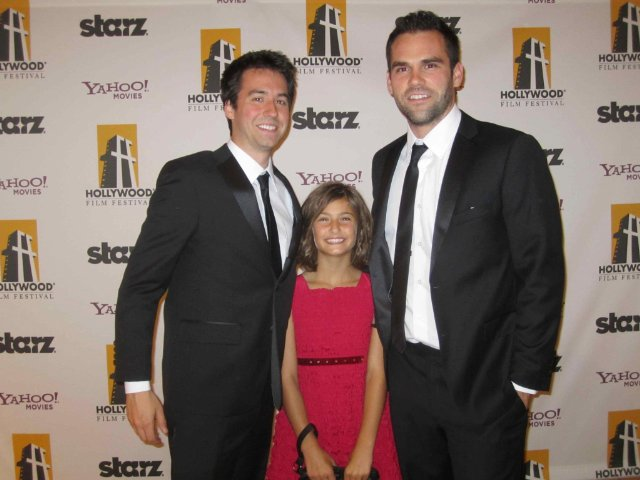
- Mark Dennis (right) attending the 14th Annual Hollywood Awards Gala with Ben Foster (left) and Olivia Draguicevich (Center)
- Born: San Antonio, Texas, United States
- Occupations: Film Director, Film Producer, Editor, Composer
- Years active: 2007–present

Mark Dennis (born May 13, 1982) is an American director, editor, producer and composer. His debut feature, Strings, won him Best Director awards at the Tulsa International Film Festival and Long Island International Film Expo (shared with collaborator Ben Foster). He was also an official selection at the Hollywood Film Festival, Austin Film Festival, Gotham Film Festival, and Ventura Film Festival.

== Life and career ==
Dennis was born in San Antonio, Texas. He attended Northwest Vista College and the University of Texas at Austin. Dennis directed, produced, and edited (along with Ben Foster) the independent film, Strings, which won Audience Awards at the Breckenridge Film Festival, White Sands International Film Festival, and Silver City Film Festival. Based on his own life experiences, Dennis wrote the screenplay for Strings while working at TSTV, the student television station at the University of Texas where he created and acted as show runner for the award-winning sketch comedy program, That's Awesome! starring Zach Anner.

== Projects ==
Mark Dennis is a director and writer, known for Time Trap (2017), Strings (2011) and The Alternate (2008).

== Awards and nominations ==
=== Strings (2011) ===
- Breckenridge Festival of Film: Winner Audience Award
- White Sands International Film Festival: Winner Audience Award
- Route 66 International Film Festival: Winner Best Thriller
- Long Island International Film Expo: Winner Best Director (with Ben Foster)
- Long Island International Film Expo: Nomination for Best Feature
- Long Island International Film Expo: Nomination for Best First Feature
- Tulsa International Film Festival: Nomination for Best Feature
- Tulsa International Film Festival: Winner Best Director (with Ben Foster)

=== Time Trap (2017) ===
- Hollywood Film Festival: Winner Jury Prize, Most Innovative Narrative feature (with Ben Foster and Pad Thai Pictures)
