= List of Australian films of 2015 =

This is a list of Australian films scheduled for release in 2015.

== 2015 ==
Title	Director	Cast (subject of documentary)	Genre	Notes	Release date
Blinky Bill the Movie	Deane Taylor	Ryan Kwanten, Rufus Sewell, Toni Collette, David Wenham, Deborah Mailman, Richard Roxburgh, Robin McLeavy, Barry Otto, Barry Humphries	Animation	Based on Blinky Bill by Dorothy Wall	17 September
The Dressmaker	Jocelyn Moorhouse	Kate Winslet, Hugo Weaving, Liam Hemsworth, Judy Davis, Sarah Snook	Drama	Universal Pictures; Based on the novel of the same name by Rosalie Ham	29 October
Force of Destiny	Paul Cox	David Wenham, Jacqueline McKenzie, Shahana Goswami	Drama		
Holding the Man	Neil Armfield	Ryan Corr, Craig Stott, Kerry Fox, Sarah Snook, Guy Pearce, Anthony LaPaglia	Drama	Based on the book Holding the Man	27 August
Infini	Shane Abbess	Daniel MacPherson, Grace Huang, Luke Hemsworth, Bren Foster, Luke Ford	Sci-fi		
Last Cab To Darwin	Jeremy Sims	Michael Caton, Jacki Weaver	Comedy drama		6 August
Mad Max: Fury Road	George Miller	Tom Hardy, Charlize Theron, Nicholas Hoult, Zoë Kravitz, Abbey Lee, Riley Keough, Hugh Keays-Byrne, Nathan Jones, Rosie Huntington-Whiteley	Science fiction	Warner Bros. Sequel to Mad Max Beyond Thunderdome (1985)	15 May
Now Add Honey	Wayne Hope	Robyn Butler, Lucy Fry, Portia de Rossi	Comedy		5 November
Oddball	Stuart McDonald	Shane Jacobson, Sarah Snook	Drama		17 September
Paper Planes	Robert Connolly	Sam Worthington, Ed Oxenbould, David Wenham, Deborah Mailman	Drama		15 January
Partisan	Ariel Kleiman	Vincent Cassel	Drama		28 May
Ruben Guthrie	Brendan Cowell	Patrick Brammall, Alex Dimitriades, Abbey Lee	Drama		16 July
Strangerland	Kim Farrant	Nicole Kidman, Joseph Fiennes, Hugo Weaving	Thriller		23 January
UNindian	Anupam Sharma	Tannishtha Chatterjee, Brett Lee	Drama		15 October

== See also ==
- 2015 in film
- 2015 in Australia
- 2015 in Australian television
- List of 2015 box office number-one films in Australia
