= Enzo Tedeschi =

Australian television producer, screenwriter

- Born: 26 November 1976 (age 49); Australia
- Occupations: Film producer, Film Editor, Screenwriter, Film Director

Enzo Tedeschi (born 26 November 1976) is an Australian producer, screenwriter, screen editor and director, who specialises in sci-fi and horror genres.

== Career ==
During Tedeschi's early career, he was an editor and supervising editor on lifestyle programs, including the Australian adventure-travel series Getaway, Things To Try Before You Die and ASTRA Award winning children's program Gardening for Kids with Madi. He was producer and editor of the feature-length documentaries Food Matters, Hungry For Change and The Crossing.

As a producer, he worked with directors Shane Abbess (Gabriel, Infini, The Osiris Child), Carlo Ledesma (The Last One, The Tunnel, Hawa), Andrew Traucki (The Reef, Black Water) and Nik Kacevski (Skinford).

In 2010, Tedeschi teamed up with fellow producer Julian Harvey to form Distracted Media. Their first project was the crowd-funded horror/thriller film The Tunnel.

Describing it as an "Aussie mock doc", Variety said The Tunnel took "a chapter from The Blair Witch Project and a page from 1973 cult item Raw Meat . . . (and) delivers a pretty good spook show in the abandoned subway tunnels beneath downtown Sydney".

The Tunnel was directed by Carlo Ledesma and co-written, co-produced and co-edited by Tedeschi and Harvey. It reached a global audience of 15 million and won Tedeschi and Harvey the Screen Producers Association of Australia Award for Breakthrough Independent Producers in 2011.

In 2012, Distracted Media produced Event Zero for Movie Extra on YouTube. The web series explored the aftermath of a train derailment and biological terror attack in Sydney's underground rail system. Tedeschi and Harvey received funding for Event Zero after their concept won the Movie Extra Webfest 2.0 competition.

Tedeschi said Event Zero was inspired by the sarin gas attacks on Tokyo's subway in 1995. "We could not get permission to shoot on any trains," he added. "It was a significant obstacle to overcome. But in the end, some clever production design and old-school in-camera trickery and we got it over the line."

Airlock was a three-part, science fiction, web series produced by Tedeschi and Harvey for Distracted Media with a $600,000 budget. It was shot in a suburban Sydney warehouse in ten days and released in 2015. "In Airlock, we are using sci-fi as a sandbox in which to play with a very topical and contentious subject - refugees," Tedeschi said.

Tedeschi directed the music video for Airlock's theme song Clear the Aura, performed by Thea Riley.

Tedeschi founded Deadhouse Films in 2015. The company produced an instalment of the horror franchise A Night of Horror Volume 1 and several shorts. It also co-produced Skinford, Skinford Chapter Two, Pet Killer and a feature-length reboot of Event Zero with French production company Rockzeline.

Directed by Tedeschi and starring Zoe Carides and Ash Ricardo, the "action thriller" Event Zero re-boot was released in select Australian cinemas in 2017.

Tedeschi wrote two episodes of Deadhouse Dark, a six-part anthology released by horror streaming platform Shudder in 2021. He also directed one Deadhouse Dark episode and was the web series' showrunner.

Monster Fest said Deadhouse Dark was "a boxful of dark and chilling tales of terror, inspired by frighteningly familiar modern trends, including dark web mystery boxes, dash cam footage and Insta-fame hungry vloggers."

Tedeschi and Chris Broadbent co-wrote and co-directed the 2024 short film It Will Find You about "the terrifying results" when a reporter interviews a convicted murderer.

Production of Resonance was completed in 2024, with Tedeschi writing, directing and producing the time travel film starring US actor Barbara Bingham. He said "cutting-edge" technology used to de-age Bingham made production happen "very fast".

== Filmography ==
Filmography
Title	Year	Format	Producer	Executive Producer	Showrunner	Director	Writer	Editor
Food Matters	2008	Feature	Yes					Yes
Ghosts of War	2010	Short	Yes					Yes
The Tunnel	2011	Feature	Yes	Yes			Yes	Yes
Hungry For Change	2012	Feature		Yes				Yes
Event Zero	2012	Series	Yes	Yes	Yes			Yes
Airlock	2015	Series	Yes	Yes			Yes	Yes
A Night of Horror Volume 1	2015	Feature	Yes	Yes		Yes		
Surge	2016	Short	Yes			Yes		
Skinford	2017	Feature	Yes	Yes				
Event Zero	2017	Feature	Yes	Yes		Yes		
Black Chamber	2017	VR	Yes	Yes				
Sammy	2017	Short		Yes				
Devil Woman	2018	Short		Yes				
Skinford Chapter Two	2018	Feature		Yes				
Pet Killer	2018	Series		Yes				
The Rift	2018	VR	Yes	Yes		Yes	Yes	
Nancy in Hell	2019	Short	Yes	Yes				
Over The Edge	2019	Short		Yes		Yes	Yes	
Deadhouse Dark	2020	Series	Yes		Yes	Yes	Yes	
