= Thym =

Thym is a surname. Notable people with the surname include:

- Georg Thym (c. 1520–1560), German teacher, poet and writer
- Jennifer Thym, American writer, film director and producer
