= Headspace (film) =

- DVD cover
- Directed by: Andrew van den Houten
- Screenplay by: Steve Klausner; William M. Miller
- Story by: Troy McCombs
- Produced by: Marius Kerdel; William M. Miller; Andrew van den Houten
- Starring: Olivia Hussey; William Atherton; Sean Young; Mark Margolis; Dee Wallace Stone; Udo Kier
- Cinematography: William M. Miller
- Edited by: Elwaldo Baptiste
- Music by: Ryan Shore
- Production company: Modernciné
- Distributed by: Freestyle Releasing
- Release dates: September 18, 2005 (Directors Guild of America); February 15, 2006 (United States)
- Running time: 96 minutes
- Country: United States
- Language: English

Headspace is a 2005 psychological horror film directed by Andrew van den Houten. The screenplay was written by Steve Klausner and William M. Miller, based on a story by Troy McCombs. It starred Christopher Denham, Olivia Hussey, William Atherton, Erick Kastel, and Sean Young, with cameos from Dee Wallace, Mark Margolis, and Udo Kier.

== Plot ==
Years after watching his mother die, Alex, a young man struggling with migraines, is hospitalized following an encounter playing chess with an strange man in the park. There he discovers his intellect begins growing at a supernatural rate as he begins hallucinating apparitions, while murders are occurring around New York City.

== Cast ==
- Christopher Denham as Alex Borden
- Olivia Hussey as Dr. Karen Murphy
- William Atherton as Dr. Ira Gold
- Sean Young as Mother
- Erick Kastel as Harry Jellinek
- Pollyanna McIntosh as Stacy
- Paul Sparks as Jason
- Mark Margolis as Boris Pavlovsky
- Larry Fessenden as Father
- Dee Wallace as Dr. Denise Bell
- Udo Kier as Reverend Karl Hartman
- Patrick Wang as Sammy Chung
- James Spruill as Lloyd Carter
- Mercedes Renard as Connie Sanchez

== Release ==
Headspace: The Director's Cut was released via cable and video on demand in North America on April 24 and via DVD & Blu-ray on 19 June 2012.

== Critical reception ==
Neil Genzlinger of The New York Times:

Not that it's a bad movie, particularly; it has all the necessary gore and beasties and gratuitous nudity that this not-very-demanding genre demands... None of this is very scary, but William M. Miller's cinematography and those big-name cameos keep it interesting.

From TV Guide:

While neither especially chilling nor particularly unpredictable, van den Houten's debut, scripted by Steve Klausner from a story by Troy McCombs and William M. Miller, aspires to little more than the usual stalk-and-slash clichés, it features a number of nice touches, including a knowing nod to H. P. Lovecraft's classic short story Pickman's Model and a slew of familiar faces in small roles, such as Udo Kier as a spooky priest and Dee Wallace-Stone and William Atherton as baffled doctors.
