= James Spruill =

James Spruill may refer to:

- Jim Spruill, American basketball and football player
- James Spruill (actor), American actor and theater teacher
- Wild Jimmy Spruill, American session guitarist
