= Ghosts of War =

Ghosts of War may refer to:

- Ghosts of War (2010 film), a 2010 short film
- Ghosts of War (2020 film), a 2020 supernatural horror film
- Ghosts of War, alternative DVD title for the 2004 South Korean film R-Point
- "Ghosts of War", song by Slayer from the 1988 album South of Heaven
