= Ghosts of War (2010 film) =

- original poster
- Directed by: David Sander
- Written by: David Sander
- Produced by: Enzo Tedeschi
- Starring: Graham Brissett; Simon Broadhurst; Darryl Bach; Peter Cross; James Downey; Simon Webster; Darren Wood
- Cinematography: Shing Fung Cheung
- Edited by: Enzo Tedeschi
- Music by: Samantha Fonti
- Production company: Red Blood Cell Productions
- Release date: 25 April 2010
- Running time: 16 minutes
- Country: Australia
- Language: English

Ghosts of War is a short film made in 2010, written and directed by David Sander and produced by Enzo Tedeschi, and starring Graham Brissett and Simon Broadhurst.

The film premiered at the Newport Beach Film Festival on ANZAC Day, April 2010; and has been officially selected by the 2010 Action On Film International Film Festival in Pasadena, California.

== Plot ==
Northern France, 1917. Australian Private Joseph Richmond and his fellow soldiers from the 18th Battalion A.I.F. have retreated into a supply trench during an artillery barrage.

After being left by himself to act as a listening post, Joe discovers the all-important trench periscope has been damaged, meaning he has to poke his head above the parapet to determine enemy movements after he can overhear them close by.

After exchanging shots with an unseen enemy, he retreats, but is confronted by a mysterious soldier. The soldier tells Joe go with him, even though he is not Joe's relief. Joe refuses to leave his post without proper orders. The soldier reveals himself to be Joe as well, that Joe's shooting exchange was fatal, and he has been dead ever since.

The mysterious soldier represents everything Joe had to leave behind to become a soldier, but now he is dead, the two must reunite so Joe's soul can meet its destiny.

== Production ==
The film was shot over two nights in September and October 2008 at one location in Sydney, Australia, and was written and directed by David Sander. The Director of Photography was Shing Fung Cheung, 1st A.D. was Luke Torrevillas, sound recordists Scott Viles and Nick Godoy, produced by Enzo Tedeschi, and with art department by Kate Newton.

All the cast of the film are members of the 18th Battalion Re-Enactment Society, a group dedicated to recreating the life and times of an Australian infantry battalion active in the First World War.

The film was edited by Enzo Tedeschi, with visual effects, graphics and grading by David Sander and Klinik Design. The soundtrack was composed and performed by Samantha Fonti. Audio post production was conducted at Sergery Sound with sound design by Cate Cahill and mix by Serge Lacroix.

== Technical Information ==
The film was shot on the Red One digital cinema camera, cut on Apple Final Cut Pro, and finished (graphics, grading, visual effects) using Adobe After Effects, Adobe Photoshop and Electric Image (3D).

Resolution: 4k, at 25fps

Finished deliverables: 4k TIFF frames, HD-CAM (high definition), SD-DVD (PAL and NTSC); SD-DigiBeta tape, 5.1 surround sound; stereo sound.

Duration: 16 minutes; a 15-minute version was made available to the 2010 Cannes Film Festival.

== See also ==
- Newport Beach Film Festival
- Action On Film International Film Festival
