= Ithuriel =

Angel

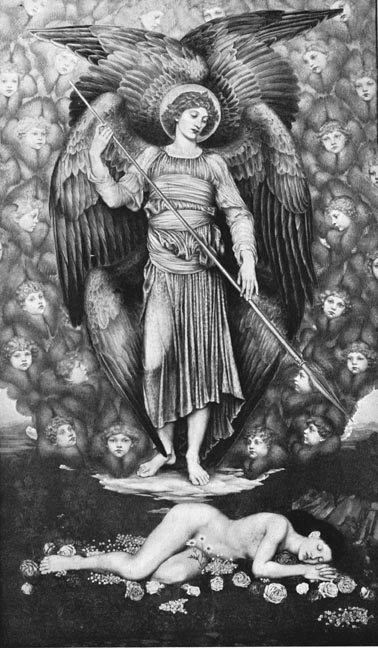
The angel Ithuriel by Evelyn De Morgan, before 1900

Ithuriel is an angel mentioned in John Milton's 1667 epic poem Paradise Lost.

== Paradise Lost ==
In Paradise Lost, Ithuriel is one of two angels (the other being Zephon) charged by the archangel Gabriel to go in search of Satan, who is loose in the Garden of Eden. They find him lurking, in the shape of a toad, close to the ear of the sleeping Eve, attempting to corrupt her thoughts. Ithuriel touches Satan with his spear, causing him to instantly resume his true form:

Him thus intent Ithuriel with his spear
Touched lightly; for no falshood [sic] can endure
Touch of celestial temper, but returns
Of force to its own likeness: Up he starts
Discovered and surprised.

The angels then compel Satan to return with them to Gabriel.

Ithuriel also appears in The State of Innocence, John Dryden's stage adaption of Milton's poem.

== Earlier usage ==
Unlike most angels named in Paradise Lost, Ithuriel does not appear in the Bible. In 1950, Robert H. West affirmed that the origins of this name had not been discovered, and that Milton may have coined it himself. Others have claimed that the name can be found in earlier Hebrew sources, such as "the 16th-century tracts of Isaac ha-Cohen of Soria", and the Kabbalistic text Pardes Rimonim. In an 1888 edition of The Key of Solomon, translated into English by S. L. MacGregor Mathers, one of the angel names written inside the first pentacle of Mars is claimed in a footnote to be a Hebrew form of Ithuriel.

== Cultural influence ==
The image of the spear of Ithuriel transforming falsehood into truth has been adopted by many authors as a poetic metaphor. John Adams, for instance, describes political philosophy as an Ithuriel's spear, which causes "prejudice, superstition, and servility" to "start up in their true shapes". U.S. Representative Justin S. Morrill, in a 1858 speech regarding the importance of agricultural colleges, made use of the metaphor, stating: "Spurious dogmas will be touched lightly with the spear of Ithuriel, and no longer squat around the ears of weary ploughmen." References to Ithuriel can also be found in the works of Rudyard Kipling, Théophile Gautier, and Victor Hugo.

Ithuriel also features as a character in some modern screen productions, such as the 2007 Australian movie Gabriel, and the American TV series Shadowhunters and Lucifer.

"Ithuriel's spear" is the common name of a native wildflower in California, Triteleia laxa.
