= Will Yun Lee =

American actor (born 1971)

William Yun Lee
- 이상욱
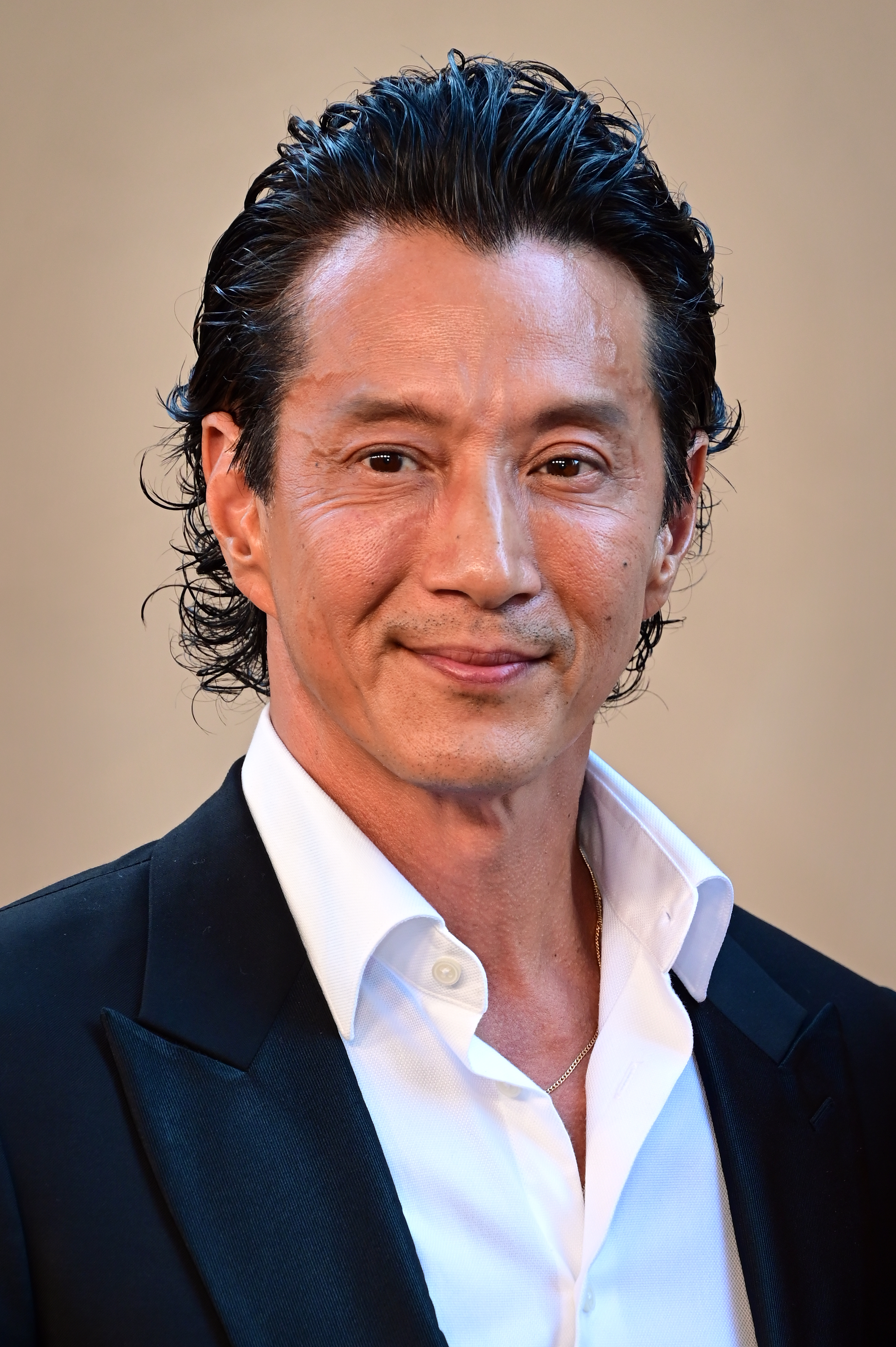
- Lee in 2026
- Born: Lee Sang-Wook; March 22, 1971 (age 55); Arlington, Virginia, U.S.
- Education: University of California, Berkeley
- Years active: 1997–present
- Spouse: Jennifer Birmingham (m. 2010)
- Children: 1

Korean name
- Hangul: 이상욱
- Hanja: 李詳旭
- RR: I Sanguk
- MR: I Sanguk

William Yun Lee (born March 22, 1971) is an American actor and martial artist. He is best known for his roles as Danny Woo in the supernatural drama Witchblade and Jae Kim in the sci-fi series Bionic Woman. He has also appeared in the films Die Another Day (2002), Elektra (2005) and The Wolverine (2013) and The Odyssey (2026). He had a recurring role as Sang Min in Hawaii Five-0, played the original body of series protagonist Takeshi Kovacs in Altered Carbon, appeared as Marvelous Man in The Guardians of Justice (2022) and voiced Wei Shen in the game Sleeping Dogs (2012). From 2018 to 2024, he has appeared on the ABC medical drama The Good Doctor playing Dr. Alex Park.

== Early life ==
Lee was born in Arlington, Virginia, to Korean parents: mother Jung Ja Lee and father Soo Woong Lee, a taekwondo grandmaster.

His parents later divorced. He began training in taekwondo at the age of three and spent part of his youth teaching at his father’s school, Lee’s Taekwondo, in Napa, California. In 2013, he re-earned his black belt and documented the process in a three-part video series, Back to Black: The Training of Will Yun Lee, which also featured his father.

Lee spent his youth moving across the United States and attended 23 schools.

Lee attended UC Berkeley with a full athletic scholarship to study political science and ethnic studies.

Lee’s parents divorced when he was four years old, and he spent much of his childhood moving between relatives and family friends before reuniting with his father in Hawaii at age ten. During this time his father, one of the first taekwondo masters to immigrate to the United States, encouraged him to pursue a professional career, but Lee eventually chose to follow acting instead. While he initially planned to study law, he decided in his mid-twenties to pursue acting after realizing the limitations of running martial arts schools. Without attending a formal drama program, he created a self-directed training routine, dedicating up to eight hours a day to acting classes, reading plays, watching films, and physical training.

== Career ==
Lee had supporting roles in high-profile films such as Die Another Day, Torque, The King of Fighters, and Elektra. He has also acted on FX Network's miniseries Thief and ABC Family's miniseries Fallen. He guest starred in Hawaii Five-0 as recurring character Sang Min, and in True Blood as Mr. Gus. He also played Kenuichio Harada in James Mangold's The Wolverine (2013). In 2018, Lee appeared in the Netflix science fiction series Altered Carbon as the original body of protagonist Takeshi Kovacs.

Lee provides the voice of Wei Shen, the protagonist in Square Enix's Hong Kong open-world crime game Sleeping Dogs.

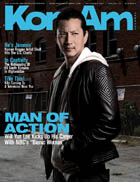
Lee on the cover of KoreAm in 2007

In 2002, People named Lee as one of their "50 Most Beautiful People", which quickly led to high-profile roles. In November 2007, he was named one of the 15 "Sexiest Men Alive".

Lee is among the actors, producers and directors interviewed in Jeff Adachi's 2006 documentary The Slanted Screen, about the representation of Asian and Asian-American men in Hollywood. He was featured in the music video of Mariah Carey's "Boy (I Need You)" as well as Ice Cube's "Real Nigga Roll Call. In February 2025, he was cast in Christopher Nolan's The Odyssey.

In the late 1990s and early 2000s, opportunities for Asian American actors were limited. Lee has recalled competing with peers such as Daniel Dae Kim, John Cho, and Sung Kang for a narrow range of stereotyped roles, often gangsters or computer experts. Because Asian actors were rarely called to audition, he created mock auditions for himself to practice and prepare.

Reflecting on later work, Lee has described his role as Dr. Alex Park on The Good Doctor as a turning point, symbolizing a move away from stereotypes toward more professional and nuanced portrayals of Asian American characters. He also cited his leading part in Altered Carbon as a rare moment when he experienced being treated as a lead in Hollywood, with large-scale production values and heroic framing typically reserved for white actors.

== Personal life ==
In October 2010, Lee married actress Jennifer Birmingham in Shreveport, Louisiana. Their son, Cash, was born in June 2013. Cash was diagnosed with Moyamoya disease, a rare disorder of the cerebral blood vessels, at the age of three.

Since entering his fifties, Lee has emphasized balancing career with family responsibilities. He has noted that he now prioritizes caring for his parents and child, and chooses roles that allow him to tell meaningful stories while maintaining a fulfilling personal life.

== Filmography ==
=== Film ===
Year	Film	Role	Notes
2000	Gung Fu: The New Dragon	Danny	
2000	What's Cooking?	Jimmy Nguyen	
2002	Die Another Day	Colonel Tan-Sun Moon	
2002	Four Reasons	Buddha	Direct-to-video
2002	Face	Daniel Chang	
2004	Torque	Val	
2005	Elektra	Kirigi	
2006	The Seed	Ken Marcado	Short film
2007	Hers	Lucas	
2008	6th and Santa Fe		Short film
2009	The King of Fighters	Iori Yagami	
2011	Where the Road Meets the Sun	Takashi	
2011	Four Assassins	Marcus Nang	
2011	Setup	Joey	Direct-to-video
2011	Five Star Day	Samuel Kim	
2011	Oka!	Yi	
2012	Total Recall	Marek	
2012	Red Dawn	Captain Cho	
2013	Superman: Unbound	Parasoldier Leader	Voice; direct-to-video
2013	Lost for Words	Stanford	
2013	The Wolverine	Kenuichio Harada	
2013	Make Your Move	Kaz	
2015	Power/Rangers	General Klank	Short film
2015	Spy	Timothy Cress	
2015	San Andreas	Dr. Kim Park	
2016	Restored Me	Trevor Kang	
2016	She Has a Name	Akkarat	
2017	Unspoken: Diary of an Assassin		
2018	Bangkok Love Story		
2018	Canal Street	Officer Hank Chu	
2018	Adi Shankar's Gods and Secrets		
2018	Rampage	Agent Park	
2019	Rogue Warfare	Daniel	
2019	Rogue Warfare 2: The Hunt	Daniel	
2021	Wish Dragon	Mr. Wang	Voice
2026	California Scenario	Jacob Hara	
2026	The Odyssey	Anchialus	

=== Television ===
Year	Film	Role	Notes
1997	Nash Bridges	Quick	Episode: "Gun Play"
1998	Profiler	Andrew Young	Episode: "Ties That Bind"
1998	Brimstone	Roger	Episode: "Poem"
1999	V.I.P.	Bobby Wu	Episode: "Mao Better Blues"
1999	The Disciples	Yoyo Lee	Television film
2000	Witchblade	Detective Danny Woo	Television film
2001	The Agency	Sam	Episode: "The Year of Living Dangerously"
2001–2002	Witchblade	Detective Danny Woo	23 episodes
2003–2004	10-8: Officers on Duty	Detective Danny Chang	2 episodes
2004	Threat Matrix	Danny Roh	Episode: "PPX"
2004	Law & Order	Hiroji Yoshida	Episode: "Gaijin"
2006	Thief	Vincent Chan	Miniseries
2006	CSI: Crime Scene Investigation	Dennis Kim	Episode: "Time of Your Death"
2006	Tsunami: The Aftermath	Chai	Miniseries
2007	Hustle	Shiro	Episode: "Conning the Artists"
2007	Fallen	Mazarin	4 episodes
2007	Bionic Woman	Jae Kim	7 episodes
2008	Finnegan	Taki	Television film
2010	Boston's Finest	Eddie Lao	Television film
2010–2017	Hawaii Five-0	Sang Min	11 episodes
2014	The Novice	The Big Bang	Television film
2014	True Blood	Mr. Gus	5 episodes
2014	Intelligence	Jin Cong	2 episodes
2015	Strike Back: Legacy	Kwon	5 episodes
2015	Dr. Ken	Kevin O'Connell	Episode: "Kevin O'Connell"
2015	The Player	Liu Zeng	Episode: "House Rules"
2015	Warrior	Susano	
2016–2018	Falling Water	Taka	Main role
2018–2020	Altered Carbon	Original Takeshi Kovacs	Recurring role (seasons 1–2); 12 episodes
2018–2024	The Good Doctor	Dr. Alex Park	Recurring role (season 1); main role (seasons 2–7)
2021–2022	Blade Runner: Black Lotus	Joseph	Voice; main role
2022	The Guardians of Justice	Marvelous Man	Main role
TBA	The Off Weeks	Willy	Upcoming miniseries

=== Video games ===
Year	Title	Voice role	Ref
2011	Saints Row: The Third	Pedestrians	
2012	The Amazing Spider-Man	Additional voices	
2012	Infex	IngenBio Guard	
2012	Sleeping Dogs	Wei Shen	
2013	Saints Row IV	The Voices of Virtual Steelport	
2015	Mortal Kombat X	Kung Lao	
2020	Yakuza: Like a Dragon	Masato Arakawa (Ryo Aoki)	
2024	Like a Dragon: Infinite Wealth	Masato Arakawa (Ryo Aoki)	
