= Andy Whitfield =

British actor (1971–2011)

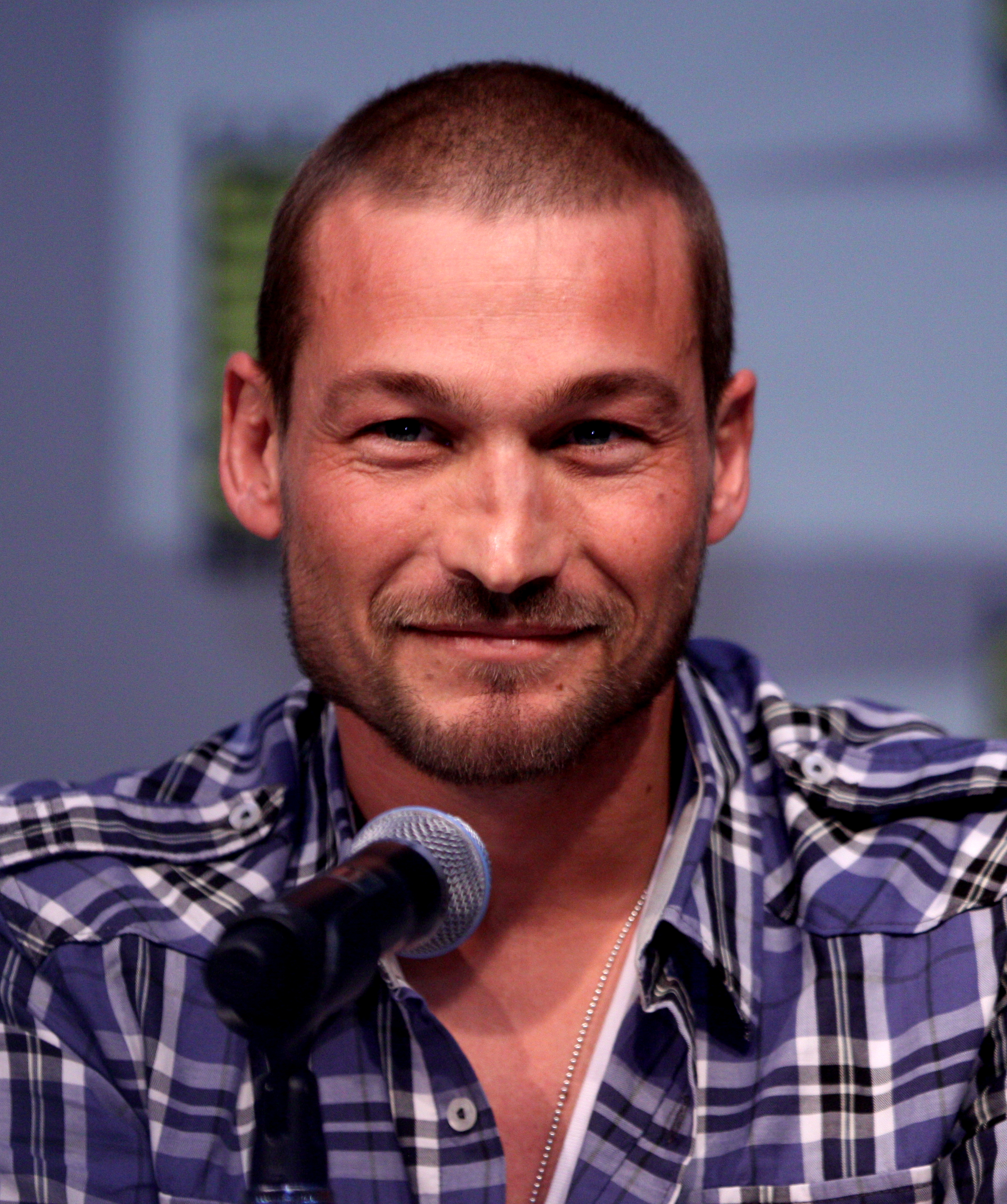
- Whitfield at the 2010 San Diego Comic-Con
- Born: 17 October 1971; Amlwch, Anglesey, Wales
- Died: 11 September 2011 (aged 39); Sydney, Australia
- Occupations: Actor; model
- Years active: 2004–2011

Andrew Whitfield (17 October 1971 – 11 September 2011) was a British actor. He was best known for his leading role in the Starz television series Spartacus: Blood and Sand.

== Early life and career ==
Andrew Whitfield was born on 17 October 1971, in Amlwch, Anglesey. Whitfield and his family came to live in Bull Bay, Anglesey, Wales in 1976. He attended Ysgol Gynradd Amlwch and then Ysgol Syr Thomas Jones until the age of 18. He studied civil engineering at Sheffield Hallam University in England. He moved to Australia in 1999 to work as an engineer in Lidcombe, before later settling in Sydney. He appeared in several Australian television series, such as Opening Up, All Saints, The Strip, Packed to the Rafters, and McLeod's Daughters.

Whitfield gained his first prominent role in the 2007 Australian supernatural film Gabriel. He also starred in the 2010 television series Spartacus: Blood and Sand, which was filmed in New Zealand. Whitfield also appeared in the Australian thriller The Clinic starring opposite Tabrett Bethell (of Legend of the Seeker fame), which was shot in Deniliquin.

In August 2010, Whitfield teamed up with Freddie Wong and created a two-minute YouTube video named "Time Crisis", based on the video game series of the same name. Whitfield made a brief, uncredited, voice-only appearance in the prequel miniseries Spartacus: Gods of the Arena, which premiered on 21 January 2011.

== Personal life ==
Whitfield married Vashti Whitfield in October 2001 and has a son and a daughter, Indigo Sky and Jessie Red.

== Illness and death ==
In March 2010, Whitfield was diagnosed with stage IV non-Hodgkin lymphoma and began undergoing immediate treatment in New Zealand. This delayed the production of the second season of Spartacus: Vengeance. Whilst waiting for Whitfield's treatment and expected recovery, Starz produced a six-part prequel, Spartacus: Gods of the Arena, with only a brief voiceover from the actor. Although declared cancer-free in June 2010, a routine medical check in September 2010 revealed a relapse and Whitfield was compelled to abandon the role. Starz recast Australian actor Liam McIntyre as Whitfield's successor.

On 11 September 2011, Whitfield died in Sydney, 18 months after his initial cancer diagnosis. A documentary titled Be Here Now premiered at the 2015 LA Film Festival. It follows Whitfield and his family as he undergoes chemotherapy treatment. It was later released on Netflix as Be Here Now: The Andy Whitfield Story.

== Filmography ==
=== Film ===
Year	Title	Role	Notes
2007	Gabriel	Gabriel	
2010	The Clinic	Cameron Marshall	
2015	Be Here Now	Himself	Released posthumously

=== Television ===
Year	Title	Role	Notes
2004	All Saints	Matthew Parkes	Season 2, episode 7: "Opening Up"
2008	The Strip	Charlie Palmer	Episodes 2 and 7
2008	Packed to the Rafters	Nick Leigh	Season 1, episode 10: "All in the Planning"
2008	McLeod's Daughters	Brett Samuels	Season 8, episode 4: "Nowhere to Hide"
2010	Spartacus: Blood and Sand	Spartacus	Lead role, 13 episodes
2011	Spartacus: Gods of the Arena	Spartacus (voice only, uncredited)	Episode 6: "The Bitter End"
