= Lost for Words (2013 film) =

2013 Hong Kong-American film by Stanley J. Orzel

- Directed by: Stanley J. Orzel
- Written by: Stanley J. Orzel
- Produced by: Maria Lo Orzel
- Starring: Sean Faris; Grace Huang; Terence Yin; Joman Chiang; Will Yun Lee
- Cinematography: Jimmy Wong
- Edited by: Darren Richter
- Music by: Andre Matthias
- Production company: Studio Strada
- Distributed by: Green Apple Entertainment
- Release dates: March 20, 2013 (Hong Kong International Film Festival); October 18, 2013 (United States)
- Running time: 107 minutes
- Countries: Hong Kong; United States
- Languages: English; Cantonese; Mandarin

Lost for Words is a 2013 romantic drama starring Sean Faris, Grace Huang, Will Yun Lee, and Terence Yin. It was theatrically released in North America on October 18, 2013. The film's tagline is "Do you Find Love....or does Love Find You?"

== Plot ==
Amid the sweeping cityscape of cosmopolitan Hong Kong, ANNA ZHOU (Grace Huang), a dancer from Beijing meets MICHAEL VANCE (Sean Faris), a decorated ex-Marine now IT specialist.

Hailing from the prestigious Beijing Dance Academy, Anna is determined to make her mark in the world of modern ballet. Unlike her best friend and fellow dancer MEI MEI (Joman Chiang), Anna is cautious with relationships and has taken a vow of chastity.

After a rocky start, Michael befriends co-worker STANFORD LAU (Will Yun Lee), another computer specialist. With Stanford's assistance, Michael navigates the competitive business world by applying his skills as a warrior. At the same time, Michael hopes the new city and his demanding work schedule will ease the pain of a recent break-up.

Michael and Anna's paths cross and a platonic friendship is struck. Michael assists Anna with her English while she teaches him Chinese. Through these language lessons and their Hong Kong adventures, Michael, without realizing it, finds a new lease on life. Slowly the wall around his heart begins to crack.

Meanwhile, the premiere of Anna's pivotal solo performance nears. Anna begins to doubt her abilities and seeks solace from her mentor, the dashing Ballet Master VICTOR YOUNG (Terence Yin).

On the day, Anna's dance solo overwhelms Michael's unrecognized resistance to the love she offers. Love blossoms.

At Michael's insistence, the couple journey to Anna's village home in Mainland China during Chinese New Year, an important time for all wayward travelers to re-unite with their families.

This fateful journey breaks the lovers apart. Will love survive?

== Production ==
Filming started on January 2, 2012, in Hong Kong in a small French café called Chez Patrick. This is where Anna and Michael first meet after they agree to help each other with language lessons. Over the course of 40 shooting days, the cast and crew traversed from one end of Hong Kong to the other. From the cosmopolitan financial center to rural landscapes to the outlying islands. One of the most spectacular scenes was shot at the famed Ngong Ping 360 on Lantau Island. Other locations included Sun Yat Sen Memorial Park, Lai Chi Kok Park, and the iconic Star Ferry.

The film features the hip hop song "Hong Kong Kowloon" by Hong Kong hip hop group 24HERBS.

Post Production took place at Park Road Post in Wellington, New Zealand.
