= Samantha Noble =

Australian actress

- Born: 15 May 1984 (age 42); Adelaide, South Australia
- Occupation: Actress
- Years active: 1998–2012
- Children: 2
- Father: John Noble

Samantha C. Noble (born 15 May 1984) is a retired Australian actress who has worked on television series and films. She is best known for her role as Jade/Amitiel in Gabriel, and has appeared in several films including See No Evil and Court of Lonely Royals.

== Biography ==
=== Personal life ===
Noble was born in Adelaide, South Australia. She is the oldest of three children. Her siblings are Dan Noble (an entrepreneur) and Jess Noble (a consultant). Their parents are actor John Noble and Penny Noble – who owns a Yoga school. Noble attended Brigidine College Randwick, (Sydney). She completed her master's degree at Sydney University in 2004 and decided after graduation that she wanted to be an actress. In 2001, Noble graduated with a BA in drama, history and education from the Australian Catholic University and she has trained at NIDA, the Actors Studio in New York, the Stella Adler Institute in Los Angeles, Ivana Chubbick Studio, On Camera Connections and ATYP. She teaches acting at several film schools in Sydney and Los Angeles. She plays the piano, guitar and saxophone, and resides in Austin, Texas, with her two children.

=== Career ===
Noble is the face of Foster's Lager in America. She has starred in several TV series including Home and Away and All Saints, and played the role of Leah in the 2008 release of the horror/thriller movie The Gates of Hell. She has also starred in See No Evil and Gabriel. She was shortlisted to co-host the American version of Gladiators and the Ben Stiller film The Heartbreak Kid. Noble has also appeared in several short films including Taxi Ride, How To Hurt, Lost Little Girl and Dead Man's Creek. She guest starred in an episode of Fringe in its fourth season along with her father, John Noble, who was a regular cast member of the show.

== Filmography ==
Film and television
Year	Title	Role	Notes
1998	All Saints	Kylie Monroe	"Possession"
2002-03	All Saints	Ebony Trafford	"No Expectations", "The Untouchables", "A Rock and a Hard Place"
2006	See No Evil	Kira	
2006	Court of Lonely Royals	Charlene Parker	
2007	Nailed	The Daughter	Video
2007	All Saints	Madeline Comfort	"Lost & Found"
2007	Gabriel	Jade	
2008	The Gates of Hell	Leah	
2012	Fringe	Dr. Benlo	"Brave New World: Part 1"
