= The Tunnel (2011 film) =

2011 film by Carlo Ledesma

- Theatrical release poster
- Directed by: Carlo Ledesma
- Written by: Julian Harvey; Enzo Tedeschi
- Produced by: Julian Harvey; Enzo Tedeschi
- Starring: Bel Deliá; Andy Rodoreda; Steve Davis; Luke Arnold; Goran D. Kleut; James Caitlin; Russell Jeffrey; Jessica Fallico
- Cinematography: Shing Fung Cheung; Steve Davis
- Edited by: Julian Harvey; Enzo Tedeschi
- Music by: Paul Dawkins
- Production companies: Distracted Media; Zapruder's Other Films; DLSHS Film
- Distributed by: Distracted Media; Deadhouse Films
- Release date: 19 May 2011
- Running time: 90 minutes
- Country: Australia
- Language: English
- Budget: $135,000

The Tunnel is a 2011 Australian found-footage monster horror film directed by Carlo Ledesma (in his feature-length directorial debut) and co-written, co-produced, and co-edited by Julian Harvey and Enzo Tedeschi. The film stars Bel Deliá, Andy Rodoreda, Steve Davis, Luke Arnold, Goran D. Kleut, and James Caitlin in a documentary-style horror story set in the underground network of abandoned railway tunnels in Sydney, Australia, where a journalist and her crew discover something horrifying lurking within the tunnels.

== Plot ==
The film is presented as found footage interspersed with interviews after the events.

In the midst of drought and water shortages, the Government of New South Wales plans to recycle millions of liters of water trapped in abandoned train tunnels beneath the heart of Sydney. However, the plan is cancelled without explanation to the public. There are rumors of homeless people taking shelter in the tunnels going missing.

Journalist Natasha, suspicious of a government cover-up, decides to pursue the story to help her difficult career. She recruits her crew, producer Peter, camera operator Steve, and audio engineer Tangles. They interview a homeless man, Trevor, who used to take shelter in the tunnels; however, when asked if something happened to him or friends of his there, Trevor suddenly breaks down into panic, and provides no answer.

Natasha takes her crew to venture into the tunnels to develop their documentary and investigate the disappearances; she does this without warning their boss. After being denied entry by a security guard, they find an alternate entrance. While exploring, the group come across abandoned squats, and old air raid shelters, discovering their map does not cover all the tunnels.

At an underground lake, Natasha provides her commentary before Tangles hears strange noises through the audio headphones. They enter an air raid bell room, where Natasha strikes the bell to capture footage of the resonating sound. Due to the bell sound distorting the audio, Tangles takes the microphone to an adjoining room to adjust the sound levels. After Natasha strikes the bell again, Peter hears something disturbing and Tangles' audio cable is suddenly pulled away through the opening. The others rush to the room, but Tangles is missing.

In the present day interview, Natasha hears the recording for the first time, where Tangles' muffled screams can be heard as he is dragged away into the tunnel.

Back in the bell room, the group find their equipment has disappeared. While searching for Tangles, they find a room with large amounts of blood on the wall and Tangles' torch. Natasha finds her night-vision camera has recorded a creature stalking them from the darkness.

While returning to the surface, the group encounter the security guard, who orders them to follow him out. The creature suddenly pounces and rapidly drags him away. Natasha, Peter and Steve flee, hiding deeper in the tunnel system. Realizing their only way out is through the entrance, they quietly make their way back. At the underground lake, the group hears a noise and use the night vision camera to discover the security guard with his eyes missing, whimpering in the shallows. The tall, humanoid creature appears, and slowly kills the guard by snapping his neck. Natasha's shocked gasp alerts the creature, and it chases the terrified group.

The creature attempts to seize Peter, but retreats from the camera light. In another room, the group discover a small pile of eyes and human flesh from previous victims. The main camera loses power, prompting Steve to replace the battery, when the creature lunges at the group. During the chaos, Natasha gets separated and runs off with the night-vision camera. The creature tracks down Natasha and seizes her, with the camera still recording as it drags her back to the lake. Steve and Peter follow the sounds back to the lake.

The creature begins to drown Natasha, but Steve and Peter chase it away with the main camera light. As Steve helps Natasha, Peter is heard in the distance screaming and challenging the monster, drawing it away. Peter emerges critically wounded, escaping with Steve and Natasha to a well-lit tunnel near a train station, as the event is captured on CCTV. Natasha borrows a cell phone to call the emergency services, breaking down and weeping as Peter dies.

The epilogue states that the coroner found Peter died from internal bleeding, Natasha resigned from her job as a journalist, Steve still works as a news cameraman, and Tangles' whereabouts remain unknown with his family still searching for answers. The police investigation was closed due to 'contradictory evidence'.

== Cast ==
- Bel Deliá as Natasha Warner
- Andy Rodoreda as Peter Ferguson
- Steve Davis as Steve Miller
- Luke Arnold as Jim 'Tangles' Williams
- Goran D. Kleut as Stalker/monster
- James Caitlin as Trevor Jones
- Russell Jeffrey as Sef

== Production ==
The film was funded using a crowd-funded financing model, as part of the "135k Project", where the film's writer-producers Enzo Tedeschi and Julian Harvey pre-sold individual digital frames of the film for A$1, to raise the film's $135,000 target budget.

Principal photography took place in Sydney, comprising on-location shoots in some of the city's disused tunnels, as well as a public pool and the Royal Australian Navy's World War II air raid shelters at Garden Island. It was shot non-sequentially in 14 days (including pick-ups) and then edited by the writing-producing team of Enzo Tedeschi and Julian Harvey.

== Release ==
=== Distribution ===
The film has been noted for its modes of release and distribution. In addition to its conventional modes of release, including a limited Australian theatrical release, screenings on Showtime Australia, and an Australian and New Zealand DVD release through Paramount Pictures Australia and Transmission Films, also released in North America in one theater and DVD by Blackrock Films, the film has garnered much attention for its unconventional release through BitTorrent. The Tunnel was the first Australian film to be distributed and promoted legally through the BitTorrent internet downloading platform, a release strategy which exposed the film to tens of millions of people, for free. This free and legal online release is a cooperation between the filmmakers, peer-to-peer distribution platform VODO and BitTorrent Inc., which is distributing the film through an app on its client.

On 18 May 2011, The Tunnel had its official premiere at Event Cinemas, Bondi Junction, at a Popcorn Taxi screening and Q&A event, and was also released simultaneously on DVD, TV, and BitTorrent.

=== Home media ===
The film was released on DVD in the United States by House Lights Media Partners on 27 December 2011.

== Reception ==
=== Box office ===
The Tunnel was shown in only one North American theater during its entire theatrical run, limiting its box-office earnings.

It also ran on several screens in Australia, its country of origin, to reportedly full cinemas. This was side-by-side with simultaneous releases in that territory on DVD, cable, iTunes, and via a custom iPad app.

=== Critical reception ===
On the review aggregator website Rotten Tomatoes, 100% of 9 critics' reviews are positive.

Richard Kuipers from Variety gave the film a positive review, writing, "Making the most of super-atmospheric locations never previously seen in an Aussie feature, debut helmer Carlo Ledesma is well served by his convincing quartet of thesps. Special kudos goes to Steve Davis, a real-life cameraman who performs impressively while also filming a sizable portion of the finished product". However, Kuipers felt that the film failed to reveal anything on the malevolent presence that lurked in the darkness. James Mudge from Beyond Hollywood.com gave the film a positive review, writing, "Though The Tunnel nevertheless remains above average and better crafted than most of the never-ending stream of found footage horrors, these missteps prevent it from shaking off the shackles of the form or from finding appeal outside dedicated fans. Still, there’s enough here to make the prospect of a sequel not unpalatable, and despite its faults the film does manage to raise the pulse rate from time to time".

In 2014, popular horror movie website Bloody Disgusting listed the film as one of the "13 Scariest Mockumentaries Ever Made".

In 2015, BuzzFeed listed the film as one of "13 Australian Horror Movies That Will Scare The Shit Out of You".

=== Awards ===
Prior to its completion, The Tunnel earned an award and a nomination for its innovative online campaign. The Tunnel has continued to receive award recognition in the festival circuit.

Won

- 17th Annual AIMIA Awards:
  - Best Use of Social Media, Word of Mouth or Viral (DLSHS – Ahmed Salama, Valeria Petrenko)
- A Night of Horror International Film Festival:
  - Best Australian Director (Carlo Ledesma)
- Screamfest Horror Film Festival:
  - Best Special Effects – 2011

Nominations

- Australian Directors Guild Awards | 2010:
  - Cross Platform Interactive (Ahmed Salama, Valeria Petrenko)
- 17th Annual AIMIA Awards:
  - Peoples Choice Award (DLSHS – Ahmed Salama, Valeria Petrenko)

== Sequel ==
In March 2012 it was announced that a sequel to The Tunnel is planned. The project is called The Tunnel: Dead-End and circles around a sibling who searches for her brother who got lost in the tunnels.

== See also ==
- Qanat
