= Stanley J. Orzel =

American film director

Stanley J. Orzel (Chinese: 何兆賢') is an American English film director and screenwriter based in Los Angeles and Hong Kong, best known for directing "Four Assassins"and Lost for Words. Orzel served as Creative Consultant on "HERO", "House of Flying Daggers", both directed by (Zhang Yimou).

== Filmography ==
2013	Lost for Words	Writer/Director
2012	"Four Assassins"	Writer/Director
