= Food Matters =

2008 Australian documentary

- Directed by: James Colquhoun; Carlo Ledesma
- Written by: James Colquhoun; Laurentine Ten Bosch
- Produced by: James Colquhoun; Laurentine Ten Bosch; Enzo Tedeschi
- Edited by: Enzo Tedeschi
- Production company: Permacology Productions
- Distributed by: Aspect Film
- Release date: 30 May 2008
- Running time: 80 minutes
- Country: Australia
- Language: English

Food Matters is a 2008 Australian documentary film about nutrition. The film presents the thesis that a selective diet can play a key role in treating a range of health conditions such as diabetes, cancer, heart disease and depression, often substituting for medical treatment. Furthermore, it tends to label the medical industry as a "sickness industry", which profits more from treating the symptoms of illness than curing the illness.
