= The Ultimate Prom Nite season 2 =

- Genre: Reality
- Presented by: Hansen Lee; Sarah Lian
- Country of origin: Malaysia
- Original language: English

Original release
- Network: 8TV
- Release: 6 November – 11 December 2008

The Ultimate Prom Nite is a Malaysian reality TV series produced by Primeworks Studios in cooperation with skincare maker Nivea. The inter-campus prom night seeks those worthy for the throne of "Ultimate Prom King and Queen" amongst students of various higher educational institutions throughout Malaysia.

Season two of The Ultimate Prom Nite aired on 8TV from 6 November till 11 December 2008. Hansen Lee and Sarah Lian were hosts, assisted by Marion Caunter and Henry Golding as judges.

== Episode list ==
#	Broadcast date	Contents
1	6 November 2008	1. Preliminary auditions 2. Grooming session
2	13 November 2008	Top 12: Mall Hunt
3	20 November 2008	Top 10: Raya charity
4	27 November 2008	Top 8: Dating the hosts
5	11 December 2008	The Prom Nite

== Auditions ==
Preliminary auditions were held from 8 July hingga 4 August in 12 selected campuses throughout Peninsular Malaysia, each of which provide a male and a female to vie for the coveted crowns.

1. Disted Stamford College, Penang
2. INTI International University College, Penang
3. INTI International University College, Nilai, Negeri Sembilan
4. INTI International University College, Subang Jaya
5. Kolej Damansara Utama, Penang
6. Kolej Lagenda, Nilai, Negeri Sembilan
7. Metropolitan College, Subang Jaya
8. Nilai International College
9. Olympia College, Kuala Lumpur
10. SEGi University College, Kota Damansara
11. Sunway University College, Johor Bahru
12. Taylor's University College

In addition, a thirteenth audition session was held in Sri Pentas, Bandar Utama (the headquarters of Media Prima and operational premises of its four TV channels), for students of just any higher-learning institution.

Those who qualified from each college might not necessarily be studying in the college where they took part. Those who qualified were:

- Victor Lucas - Kolej Han Chiang
- Kan Wai Ling - Sunway University College, Johor Bahru
- Colin Chia Siang - Sunway University College, Johor Bahru
- Felicia Tan - Taylor's University College
- Mohd Farhan - SEGi University College, Kota Damansara
- Atiqah Nabilah - Kolej Lagenda, Nilai
- Adam Jayarathim - INTI International University College, Penang
- Azimah Arshad - SEGi University College, Kota Damansara
- Birendra Bahadur - INTI International University College, Nilai
- Belinda Chong - INTI International University College, Nilai
- Arvind Kalia - Kolej Damansara Utama, Penang
- Mea Hing Jian - Nilai International College
- Carmen Leong - Nilai International College
- Hadry Hyzan - Taylor's University College
- Fatin Johanna - Taylor's University College
- Teng Ivan - Metropolitan College, Subang Jaya
- Radiah Nazir - Taylor's University College
- Mohd Izhafran - Kolej Lagenda Nilai
- Shereen Liang - INTI International University College, Subang Jaya
- Nicolette Ng - Metropolitan College, Subang Jaya
- Syed Mohd Danial - Taylor's University College
- Rhea M. Pereira - ?
- Preeyan - APT Academy

== Grooming ==
The qualified participants kicked off their journey toward the thrones by attending a week-long grooming session which began by a skincare class by Nivea and wholly uses Nivea products.

This was followed by an acting workshop led by Nazril Idrus and Sazzy Falak. The participants were made to make animal sounds for grouping; four distinct sounds were heard and thus they were divided into four groups. Each group took the stage to make a creative introduction before they practice what they were taught by playing a drama.

The acting session ended with some "nice walk" training, in which each contestant is required to make a creative and expressive grand entrance toward the audience in the same manner as TV hosts.

The weekend ended with Henry Golding and Marion Caunter stepping in as judges to test each contestant by asking questions and reviewing recorded confessions, to determine the Top 12. The lucky twelve who made it were: Farhan, Birendra, Adam, Ivan, Danial, and Jian (males); and Nicolette, Radi, Azimah, Fatin, Carmen, and Shereen (females).

== Top 12 ==
The Top 12 were taken to the 1 Utama shopping centre for their next challenge: the Mall Hunt, to test their abilities as team players, leaders and participants. They were divided into two teams of six – Team 1 and Team 2 (or Team A and Team B in the captions) – to perform a total of six tasks in the mall within a 90-minute limit; one task for one member of each team only. Before they begin each next task, each team was given a clue to determine their next task. After completing each task, the member who performed it collected a tag to mark their completion. The Mall Hunt was probably held no later than mid-September; this can be told from the Mid-Autumn Festival stalls in the footage.

The six tasks (and their riddles), in no particular order, were as follows:

Task	Venue	Description	Clue
The Batting Cages	It's a Hit! Batting Cages, Upper Roof	Hit baseballs machine-tossed at increasing speeds	One part of me is hidden in the bat cave, The other part is also called a popular song, All you need to do is swing and not miss me, Or you will stand in my cage for too long.
The Rock Climb	Camp 5, 5th Floor	Climb a 12-metre wall and touch a specified marker	You could climb a ladder or you could climb a tree, While others just prefer to journey up me, My goosebumps are strong enough for hands to handle, But a bad rope could sometimes end you up on a tangle.
The Polaroid Model	High Street, Ground Floor	As a team, find one among the shoppers for one of them holding the Polaroid camera to take some photographs	Find a model for the following Nivea tagline: "Beauty is a sparkle" (Team 2); "Men who zest for life" (Team 1)
The Book Hunt	MPH Bookstores, 1st and 2nd Floors	As a team, complete the crossword, all the answers of which form the title of the book to be searched by one of them	I hold the stones that you type and write, And immortalise them on sheets for everyone's sight, Your discoveries are knowledge which I hold dear, Without me everything will be unknown to all ears.
The Futsal Challenge	Futsal @ 1U, Upper Roof	Dribble a ball past the training cones and kick it into a small goal post	My game is similar to the famous other, While they count twelve I just take five, Some find my rules are not such a border, But a score is what keeps both games alive.
The Snakey Business	Reptiles Exhibition, Lower Ground	Handle a python out of its enclosure, clean the reptile, and remove waste from the enclosure	In the Garden of Eden I whispered in your ear, In the school of magic I'm the simbol everyone fears, Should you ever drop by to visit my glass house, Will you please bring me a fat juicy mouse.

The following are the Top 12 and their respective tasks, in chronological order:

Team 1		Team 2	
Member	Task	Member	Task
Farhan	The Rock Climb	Biren	The Batting Cages
Nicolette	The Book Hunt	Radi	The Polaroid Model
Ivan	The Futsal Challenge	Jian	The Rock Climb
Fatim	The Polaroid Model	Carmen	The Snakey Business
Adam	The Snakey Business	Azima	the Futsal Challenge
Shireen	The Batting Cage	Danial	The Book Hunt

Team 1 completed all their tasks and reached the finish line first, while Team 2 trailed behind by five minutes. At the decisive meeting with Caunter and Golding, all members of Team 1 were exempt from elimination as a reward for their success in the Mall Hunt, while those of Team 2 were called up for another round of questioning to ask them why each of them should remain in the game; as well as to determine which one girl and one boy should leave the competition. Radi and Biren wereeliminated from the challenge, leaving the Top 10 for their next challenge.

== Top 10 ==
Hari Raya Aidilfitri celebrations were around the corner, so the Top 10 were taken to the Rumah Kasih Harmoni orphanage in Sungai Buloh for a weekend to test their ability to display dedication, compassion, and their being a role model to society. Among the tasks which they performed there included cooking, housekeeping, laundry, fun and games with the orphans, as well as preparing for Raya.

On day two, the contenders were brought to Cineleisure Damansara where they were split into two again, i.e. the girls' and boys' stall, to sell as many Nivea "charity goodie bags" for five hours to raise as much money for Rumah Kasih Harmoni. Together they contributed RM3,000 to the orphanage fund (another RM7,000 was added by Nivea into the donation).

At the end of the charity stint, the Top 10 again faced Caunter and Golding for another round of inquisition of their experiences throughout the challenge, to determine who would be eliminated this time; it was Jian and Shireen's turn to depart from the competition.

== Top 8 ==
In October, four guys and four girls were assigned their final task before six of them would star in the Ultimate Prom Nite, which is a date with the hosts for dinner in Avanti's in Sunway Resort Hotel (Farhan, Carmen, Danial, Nicolette) or fun under the sun in Sunway Lagoon (Adam, Azima, Ivan, Fatin); the boys dated Sarah while Hansen went one-on-one with the girls. Earlier, after the Top 10 elimination, the remaining finalists picked a paper cutting from a transparent bowl to determine the venue of their date. "The Confidence Beauty Regime", their quick grooming-up with Nivea products, was a must for the contestants before each date.

Dinner

- Farhan & Sarah:Farhan presented Sarah a sunflower to leave a good first impression. He reminded her that he is not an adventurous eater who largely insists on chicken. Midway through dinner, he presented her with a rose. When asked on his history with girlfriends, he replied that "it depends on how much is many." Moreover, he admitted that he had to abstain from 'sad' films that make him shed tears. After their meal, they played snooker in the lounge. At the end of the date, Farhan gave Sarah a collage of herself from the FHM magazine cover.
- Carmen & Hansen: Carmen arrived at the dining table with brownies in a shopping bag for Hansen. When asked of herself, she answered that she was the eldest of four siblings; when asked back, Hansen just told her he was the youngest sibling of all sisters. When asked of her favourite qualities of men, her reply was those who could "make me laugh all the time." After the meal, they strolled at the garden in the vicinity of the hotel, where Hansen learnt that Carmen wanted to make her dates as memorable as possible.
- Danial & Sarah: Danial presented Sarah with a small bouquet of three orange roses and a lavender before the meal, which Sarah thought was a "sweet gesture." Midway through their meal, Danial told Sarah he liked chicken rice but not durians. He also appeared less than adventurous in the garden walk. In the confession, Sarah said Danial's first impression was plain while their walk in the garden was "just a walk," which in all made him "not meet the requirements."
- Nicolette & Hansen: Hansen commented on Nicolette's air of confidence when she walked in for dinner. When he asked of her ideal date, she replied that the date need not be fancy, just comfortable. She gave him a "cheeky" miniature teddy bear dressed with horns and a cape. They ended their date with dessert in the lounge.

Theme Park

- Adam & Sarah: Adam greeted Sarah with a rose, treated her with ice-cream and took her around the Animal Park. Adam told her his favourite animal was the dragon, and the edited footage appeared to recreate what Adam imagined of the animals in the mini-zoo. They also shown trying out the Pirate's Revenge and Buffalo Bill Coaster rides in the Amusement Park, among others, and taking a doctored picture with a tiger in the snow.
- Azima & Hansen: Azima started their date by giving Hansen a floral garland. They were shown riding in the Amusement Park, playing in the arcade and enduring the Scream Park. Azima commented that she and Hansen liked extreme sports. When asked of her favourite man on a ride, she was stumped, after telling Hansen she was not a fussy girl.
- Ivan & Sarah: The date started with Sarah looking down from a tower at Ivan kneeling toward her with a rose. Ivan told her he hated one-on-one dates, having lived in groups all the time. They were shown riding the G-Force catapult and the Tomahawk. Sarah commented that although Adam was problematic, she thought it was a great date in which they learnt more of each other.
- Fatin & Hansen: They first chose an exciting ride in the form of the Tomahawk, before visiting the Animal Park and playing the simulation race and video games in the arcade. Hansen commented that Fatin's ooze of confidence could "intimidate a guy," thus having passed with flying colours. On the carousel, Fatin presented Hansen a pencil sketch of himself on a sheet of paper.

The Top 8 confronted their last cut-out in SEGi Kota Damansara, this time with the hosts joining Caunter and Golding on the panel of four in the most crucial elimination session to select the Top 6 finalists for the Prom Nite. The judges reminded them that they were looking for one male and one female who could reach out to everyone rather than somebody intelligent or charming. Each contestant was evaluated individually concerning their date and their take on the competition and what they learnt while in contention.

Finally, the hosts short-listed Fatin, Adam, Azima, Ivan, Nicolette and Farhan as the Top 6 who would vie for the Ultimate Prom King and Queen crowns, leaving Danial and Carmen out of contention. From 27 November 2008, 10.30pm (after this episode was broadcast) till 10pm the next day, viewers would vote for their favourite contestant which forms 50% of the overall results, the other half being judges' evaluation, to determine the Prom King and Queen.

== Finale ==
The "prom nite" of the Ultimate Prom Nite season two was recorded in the night of 28 November 2008, only to be telecast on 11 December. The top six arrived by limousine at the Kota Damansara campus of SEGi University College, which was also attended by 2007 Prom King Reagan Kang Ti Kern.

The event proper kicked off with a performance from the CHARM cheerleader squad, followed by the appearances in pairs of Adam and Nicolette, Ivan and Azima, and Farhan and Fatin, introduced by Lee and Lian in front of a dining hall audience. Also present were the judges Marion Caunter, Henry Golding and specially-invited Amber Chia on the panel. After the introductions, the hip-hop dance trio Floor Fever performed before the audience to the turntabling of DJ Iman.

The finalists' first challenge in the Prom Nite was to dance a ballroom-jazz routing in pairs, which they practised in William & Luisa's Danceworld as shown in the footage. Adam and Nicolette danced to Let It Rock by Kevin Rudolf and Lil Wayne; Ivan and Azima to Keeps Gettin' Better (Christina Aguilera); and Farhan and Fatin to Womanizer (Britney Spears).

The second and most important challenge for the top six was another question and answer session which seeks everything the judges needed to know to determine the most worthy for the crowns. Each contestant prepared a campaign video before they respond to judges' questions on their personality.

- Adam’s campaign video had him preparing a meal in a kitchen to display the importance of living skills. After fulfilling her request to do a "catwalk", he responded to Marion's question of which challenge really affected him the most, which is the Raya charity stint in the orphanage, which he claimed reminded him to take a hard look at what he had which the orphans were not so lucky to have.
- Fatin recorded herself in a futsal activity in her campaign video to display her sense of teamwork. Marion asked what was her definition of a role model, which she mentioned of her emphasis on time management. On Amber's question on life after college, she told that she would be a "super-cool" architect as well as pursuing a double diploma on architecture and fashion design.
- Ivan made a music video of his own rap song. Henry asked for his motto in life; he gave "Success is not a destination; success is a journey."
- Nicolette performed her rendition of Colbie Caillat's Realize and danced in her video, to emphasise on enjoyment. Henry asked for her strengths and weaknesses; her strength was her sense of "passion" but being perfectionist made her soft spot. Amber gave the role model question again, and she advised on giving one's best in studies but enjoying life at the same time.
- Farhan told the world his life was about cars by drifting. Henry asked what he learnt throughout the competition; the seasoned "team leader" said he learnt of teamwork, understanding, open minds and leadership. Amber asked of his future after college, he admitted his dream of living luxuriously in Germany.
- Fatin recorded herself scuba diving in the pool as a hobby which defined herself. Marion asked of her life after studies, she spoke of herself opening up businesses, possibly scuba diving, around the world. Amber asked for her weakness, and Fatin admitted being shy.

Before the results, a footage of whom the other 14 contestants voted for among the top 6 was screened. After the judges made their decision combined with the public votes, Adam and Nicolette were crowned the Ultimate Prom King and Queen respectively, each receiving RM10,000 and a 15-minute appearance on the 8TV Quickie.

Nicolette appeared on the Quickie on 16 December; Adam on the 19th.
