= Jennifer Thym =

American writer, film director and producer

- Born: New York City, New York, U.S.
- Occupations: Film director; Producer; Writer

Jennifer Thym is an American writer, film director and producer currently based in Hong Kong. Thym's award winning films include "Bloodtraffic" and "Jasmine".

== Early life ==
Thym was born in New York City, New York. Thym is of Cantonese and Taiwanese heritage. Thym grew up in the rural South in U.S.

== Career ==
Under her banner RockGinger, Thym has written, directed and produced a short film entitled "Bloodtraffick" starring Grace Huang and Kirt Kishita. The film won a "Best Actress" award for Grace Huang at the HollyShorts Film Festival, received Best Short Film, Best Cinematography and Best Editing awards at the Salty Horror International Film Festival, an excellence in directing, cinematography and original screenplay at the Stiletto Film Fest, Best Cinematography at the Viscera Film Festival, and has screened at film festivals such as the San Diego Asian Film Festival, the Philadelphia Asian American Film Festival, the Gen Con Indy Film Festivala, the Action On Film International Film Festival and more.

A feature film produced by Thym and directed by Dax Phelan entitled Jasmine was released in 2011, is set in Hong Kong and which also stars Jason Tobin, Grace Huang, Eugenia Yuan, Sarah Lian and Byron Mann.

=== Web series ===
Thym has also directed, written and created an award-winning and nominated web series, Lumina. The web series has also been nominated for best editing from the Webby Awards as well as best cinematography from the Streamy Awards, and best directing and writing nominations for Thym from the Indie Soap Awards and best actor nominations for Michael Chan and JuJu Chan from the American Soap World Awards.

Thym has also directed, written and created a comedy web series entitled Mister French Taste starring Osric Chau, Sarah Lian and Oliver Malet. With over 1.4 million views worldwide, Mister French Taste takes a hilarious look at the practice of etiquette coaching in Hong Kong.

== Filmography ==
=== Film ===
- 2015 Jasmine

=== Television ===
- 2009 Lumina - as writer, director, producer.
- 2012 Mister French Taste. Season 1 episode "Chateau Decadence" - as director.
