= Mercedes Renard =

American actress

- Occupations: Film, television actress
- Years active: 2002–present

Mercedes Renard is an American actress.

== Career ==
She made her big screen debut with roles in two feature films in 2005. The first, an independent, sci-fi thriller titled Headspace, featured Renard in the role of reporter Connie Sanchez. That same year, she played the role of Maria alongside Will Smith and Eva Mendes in the romantic comedy Hitch. She appeared in the seventeenth season episode, "Corner Office," of Law & Order, the third-season finale of House, and played one of the titular roles in the 2012 film Four Assassins.
