= Four Assassins =

2011 Hong Kong-American film by Stanley J. Orzel

- Directed by: Stanley J. Orzel
- Written by: Stanley J. Orzel
- Produced by: Maria Lo Orzel
- Starring: Will Yun Lee; Miguel Ferrer; Hiro Hayama
- Cinematography: Lam Wah Chuen
- Edited by: Darren Richter
- Music by: Andre Matthias
- Production company: Studio Strada
- Distributed by: Inception Media Group
- Release dates: April 2011 (WorldFest Houston); February 28, 2013 (United States)
- Running time: 87 minutes
- Countries: Hong Kong; United States
- Language: English

Four Assassins, also known as Far Away Eyes, is a 2011 action thriller starring Will Yun Lee, Miguel Ferrer, Hiro Hayama, Mercedes Renard, and Oliver Williams. The film premiered at 2011 WorldFest Houston. Inception Media released the DVD and online versions of the film on February 18, 2013.

== Plot ==
Marcus Nang (Will Yun Lee), an ace hitman in the underworld was summoned to meet with three professional colleagues in a luxury hotel suite after completing a recent contract. The first to arrive are Cordelia Leigh (Mercedes Renard) and Chase (Oliver Williams). The sexy Cordelia is Marcus's ex-girlfriend and an equally deadly killer. Chase, a brutal French assassin, is looking to make inroads into the business. The last to arrive is Eli (Miguel Ferrer), an aging gentleman who has been in the trade longer than he cares to remember. Mentor to both Marcus and Cordelia, it's been years since Eli last saw the two. The situation takes on the air of a family reunion. Friendships are renewed. Past exploits are remembered. Except for Chase, an outsider who becomes fed up with the nostalgia and demands to get to the heart of the matter. Tension mounts, as Eli demands to know what went wrong with the kill. Marcus insists that it all went perfectly and that there's nothing to worry about. Eli pressures him further; revealing that one of the two bodies is missing. Marcus remains adamant that he completed the job. But clearly, something is wrong. It becomes apparent that Cordelia has never forgiven Marcus for a dark deed in the past. Eli wants answers while Chase is driven to find the missing "body" and complete the hit. Tempers flare. Accusations fly. And cat-and-mouse game escalates. Each assassin harbors their own agenda and each is willing to sacrifice the others to fulfill it. Marcus's life is in grave danger as the situation further deteriorates. And blood begins to flow. Various lies are peeled away. Marcus is indeed hiding something. What might he be hiding? How does it relate to the missing body? And why? The dark mystery unravels, leading to an explosive and deadly showdown where no one can be trusted.

== Production ==
The film was shot entirely on location in (Hong Kong) at the historic Perowne Barracks a former British army barrack located in Tuen Mun.
