= Grace Huang =

Taiwanese-Australian actress

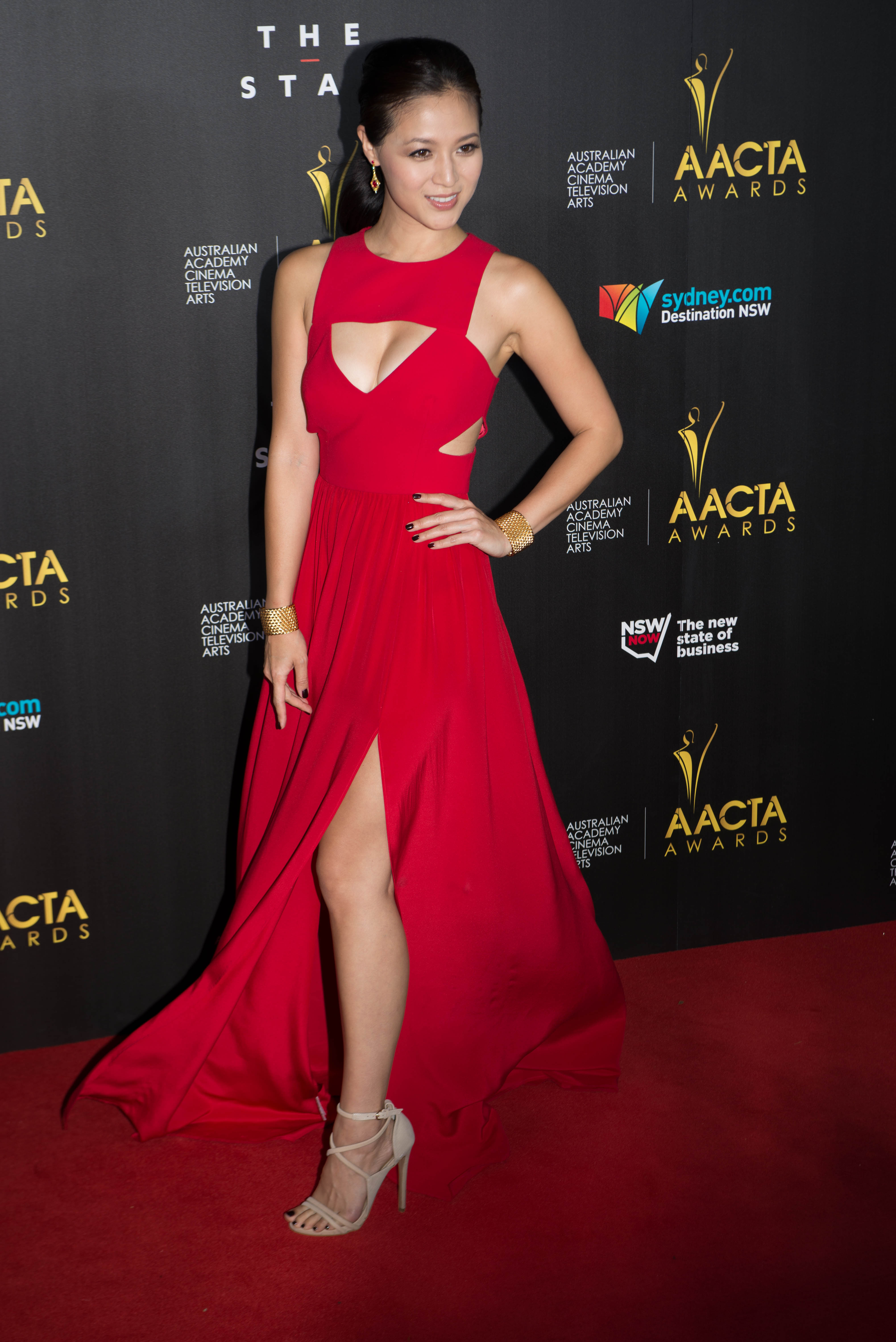
- Grace Huang at the 2014 AACTA Awards
- Born: 26 January 1983 (age 43); Taiwan
- Occupations: Model, actress
- Years active: 2006–present

Grace Huang (Chinese: 黃芝琪; pinyin: Huáng Zhīqí) is a Taiwanese-Australian actress of Cantonese descent, best known for her role as the Gemini Female in the RZA directed martial arts film, The Man with the Iron Fists.

== Career ==
Huang starred as Mei Chen in the pilot for the 2013 CBS TV series Intelligence, and plays May in the Hong Kong action film Cold War starring Aaron Kwok, Andy Lau and Tony Leung Ka-fai. She is also starring as Bunny in the Hong Kong comedy-romance film Love in Space, and as Jenny in the Hong Kong Action film Overheard alongside Daniel Wu, Michael Wong, Sean Lau, which is directed by Felix Chong and Alan Mak.

Huang won a Best Actress award at the HollyShorts Film Festival for her portrayal of the character Ava Chen in Jennifer Thym's vampire-and-angel action short film, Bloodtraffick. A frequent collaborator with Thym on several other projects, she is involved in the Hong Kong-set feature film Jasmine in which Huang stars in alongside Byron Mann, Jason Tobin, Brian Yang, Sarah Lian, and Eugenia Yuan and in which Thym produced and Dax Phelan directed. In 2013, she played the role of a love interest to Sean Faris in Lost for Words.

Apart from being active in Australian and Hong Kong cinema, Huang has also appeared in the Taiwanese Golden Bell Award-winning television drama "Friends". She frequently appears in print and TV ad campaigns for Vidal Sassoon, Neutrogena, Canon, HSBC and the Australian Tourism Board, and has been featured on the covers of magazines such as Vogue, Harper's Bazaar, FHM, Oyster, Elle, and Marie Claire.

== Filmography ==
Film
Year	Title	Role	Notes
2009	Overheard	Jenny	
2010	Red Earth		Short film
2011	Bloodtraffick	Ava Chen	Short film
2011	Love in Space	Bunny	
2012	The Man with the Iron Fists	Gemini Female	
2012	Cold War	May Cheung	
2013	Badges of Fury		
2013	Lost for Words	Anna	
2014	Jasmine	Jasmine To	
2015	Infini	Claire Grenich	
2015	The Man with the Iron Fists 2	Gemini Female	
2016	Independence Day: Resurgence	Lin Tang	
2016	Science Fiction Volume One: The Osiris Child	Jandi	
2018	In Like Flynn	Achun	

Television
Year	Title	Role	Notes
2012	Strangers 6	Fei Fei	
2014	Intelligence	Mei Chen	1 episode: "Pilot"
2015	Hiding	Cindy	1 episode
2015	Paranormal Mind	Madam O	
