= The Osiris Child: Science Fiction Volume One =

2016 Australian science fiction film

The Osiris Child
- Film poster
- Directed by: Shane Abbess
- Screenplay by: Shane Abbess
- Story by: Shane Abbess; Brian Cachia
- Produced by: Sidonie Abbene; Shane Abbess; Brian Cachia; Matthew Graham; Brett Thornquest
- Starring: Kellan Lutz; Daniel MacPherson; Isabel Lucas; Rachel Griffiths; Temuera Morrison; Teagan Croft
- Cinematography: Carl Robertson
- Edited by: Adrian Rostirolla
- Music by: Brian Cachia
- Distributed by: Madman Entertainment
- Release date: 24 September 2016
- Running time: 95 minutes
- Country: Australia
- Language: English
- Box office: $135,532

The Osiris Child: Science Fiction Volume One (also known simply as The Osiris Child and in Europe as Origin Wars) is a 2016 Australian science fiction film directed by Shane Abbess and starring Daniel MacPherson, Kellan Lutz, and Rachel Griffiths.

== Premise ==
Sy Lombrok, a former nurse, is thrown together with Kane Sommerville, a lieutenant who works for Exor – an off-earth military contract company in humanity's extraterrestrial future – as they search for Kane's young daughter Indi before disaster strikes.

== Cast ==
- Kellan Lutz as Sy Lombrok
- Daniel MacPherson as Lieutenant Kane Sommerville
- Isabel Lucas as Gyp
- Luke Ford as Bill
- Rachel Griffiths as General Lynex
- Temuera Morrison as Warden Mourdain
- Teagan Croft as Indi Sommerville
- Bren Foster as Charles Kreat
- Dwaine Stevenson as The Ragged
- Grace Huang as Jandi
- Firass Dirani as Clarence Carmel
- Bianca Bradey as Shae Holliday
- Brendan Clearkin as Bostok Kramer

== Production ==
Shooting took place in Coober Pedy in South Australia and Gladesville and Sydney in New South Wales. The producers credited include director Shane Abbess and Brian Cachia, with Cachia also composing the music.

== Release ==
The Osiris Child: Science Fiction Volume One had its world premiere in September 2016 at Fantastic Fest, in Austin, Texas. It premiered in Australia at the Gold Coast Film Festival on 21 April 2017. Beyond film festivals, the film received a very limited release, such as 29 theatre screens in its home country of Australia, and brought in a worldwide gross of US$135,532 at the box office.

== Reception ==
On the review aggregator website Rotten Tomatoes, 60% of 20 critics' reviews are positive, with an average rating of 5.8/10. Metacritic, which uses a weighted average, assigned the film a score of 55 out of 100, based on 5 critics, indicating "mixed or average" reviews.

Joe Leydon of Variety called it 'serviceable' and 'pulpy' but praised the film for the acting, while Andy Webster praised the director, Shane Abbess, calling the movie 'delirious, overheated stew.' Michael Reichshaffen of Los Angeles Times criticised the screenplay by Brian Cachia, pointing out that it "lacks novelty, and, occasionally, coherence."
