= Daniel MacPherson =

Australian actor

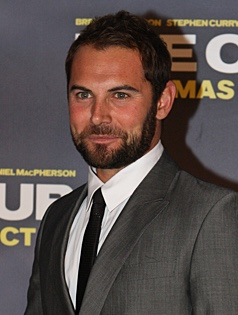
- MacPherson at the Sydney premiere of The Cup in 2011
- Born: April 1980 (age 46); Sydney, New South Wales, Australia
- Occupations: Actor; television presenter
- Years active: 1990–present
- Spouse: Zoë Ventoura (m. 2015; sep. 2020)
- Children: 1

Daniel MacPherson (April 1980) is an Australian actor and television presenter, known for his roles as Joel Samuels in Neighbours, PC Cameron Tait in The Bill, Sergeant Samuel Wyatt in Sky and Cinemax's Strike Back, Whit Carmichael in the Shane Abbess sci-fi film Infini, Arion Elessedil in The Shannara Chronicles and Hugo Crast in the first filmed adaptation of Isaac Asimov's long running Foundation novel series, adapted as Foundation. He also co-hosted Dancing with the Stars for six years while simultaneously starring in a number of Australian dramas such as Wild Boys.

== Early life ==
MacPherson was born in April 1980 in Sydney, to parents Keith and Anne. He has a brother Andrew and a sister Brodie. MacPherson grew up in Sydney's beachside suburb of Cronulla. He was accepted into Mensa at the age of 10, and went on to attend the academically selective school Sydney Boys High School. MacPherson competed in triathlons for 25 years, representing Australia as an amateur at world championship level for Olympic Distance, 70.3, and the Ironman World Championships in Kona, Hawaii.

== Career ==
MacPherson was discovered by a talent scout while stewarding a triathlon in southern Sydney when he was 16. After attending some auditions, he was offered an 18-month contract to play Joel Samuels in the soap opera Neighbours, starting in 1998. For his performance as Joel, MacPherson won the 1999 Logie Award for Most Popular New Talent. After leaving the soap in 2002, MacPherson travelled to the United Kingdom to star in a British production of the musical Godspell in which he alternated the lead roles of Jesus and Judas with British entertainer Jonathan Wilkes. During this time MacPherson resided in Notting Hill with close friend Robbie Williams. After completing the show, MacPherson was offered the role of PC Cameron Tait in the British drama The Bill, which he played from 2003 until late 2004. Upon leaving The Bill, he took a role playing Jesus opposite Edward Woodward as God in The Mysteries. This was a drama based on a medieval mystery play cycle in which every scene moved to a different part of Canterbury Cathedral.

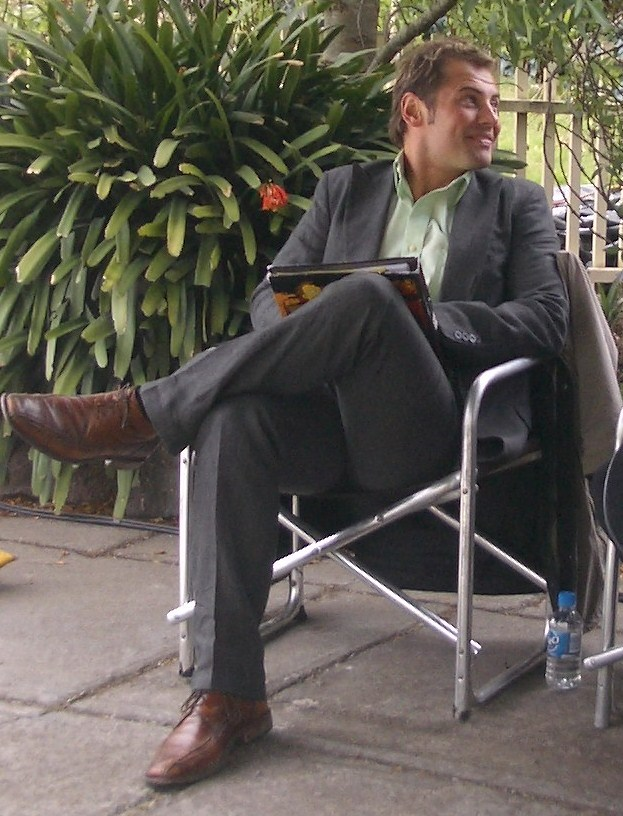
MacPherson on the set of City Homicide in 2008

In 2005, MacPherson returned to Australia to host The X Factor. Despite the series garnering low ratings, MacPherson received positive feedback for his performance. After the season concluded, reports emerged that, before one of the live shows, MacPherson was accidentally knocked unconscious by a crew member. After regaining consciousness several minutes later, and being rushed to hospital, MacPherson went on to do the show that night despite being heavily concussed. He says he "remembers nothing at all" from that night's broadcast. This was undetected by the public. The following year, MacPherson hosted a three-part series called Killer Sharks on Australia's Network Ten in February 2006. In late 2006, he appeared in a British/Australian production entitled Tripping Over. The show appeared on Channel 5 in the United Kingdom and Network Ten in Australia. Tripping Over featured MacPherson's ex-Neighbours co-star Brooke Satchwell. Tripping Over received numerous positive reviews and the show was a hit with Australian critics; however due to funding issues it was not picked up for a second season.

In October 2007, MacPherson left Network Ten after taking a role on the Seven Network's City Homicide. The show became the number one Australian Drama between 2007 and 2008. MacPherson left City Homicide during the fourth season. On 3 August 2008, the Seven Network announced that MacPherson would be taking over the hosting role on Dancing with the Stars, after former host Daryl Somers resigned at the end of 2007. This was his first live hosting job since The X Factor in 2005. On 17 May 2010, MacPherson guest co-hosted The Morning Show alongside Kylie Gillies, while regular presenter Larry Emdur was on holiday. MacPherson hosted Beat the Star, a local version of the British and German television series for one season before the show was cancelled.

In 2011, MacPherson returned to hosting season 11 of Dancing with the Stars in the first half of the year, before filming a new "Australian Western" style show, called Wild Boys based around Bushrangers. MacPherson played the lead role and the show's protagonist, Jack Keenan and starred alongside Zoe Ventoura. Wild Boys premiered to strong ratings of 1.67 million viewers. This was not to last, and in November 2011, the Seven Network chose not to make a second season of the show. In 2013 MacPherson played the lead role of Whit in Shane Abbess's sci fi feature film Infini. In 2014, MacPherson resigned from Dancing with the Stars to focus on his film career; his replacement was comedian Shane Bourne. MacPherson and Abbess reunited in 2015 for another science fiction film, SFV1, with MacPherson starring alongside American actor Kellan Lutz.

In February 2015, it was announced that MacPherson had landed the role of Arion in MTV's fantasy drama series The Shannara Chronicles. He also appeared in the crime series APB. MacPherson appeared in a documentary special celebrating Neighbours' 30th anniversary titled Neighbours 30th: The Stars Reunite, which aired in Australia and the UK in March 2015. In 2016, MacPherson was a fill-in co-host on The Project with Carrie Bickmore. From 2017, he starred as Samuel Wyatt in the action series Strike Back. He also made appearances in feature films The Osiris Child (2016) and A Wrinkle in Time (2018).

MacPherson played restaurateur Anton Pooley in the 2019 Nine Network drama series Bad Mothers. In 2022, he appeared in Russell Crowe's directorial debut Poker Face. The following year, he appeared in the thriller play 2:22 A Ghost Story in Melbourne. He also starred in a touring production of The Woman In Black, alongside John Waters in May 2024. That same year, he appeared in the action film Land of Bad, followed by a lead role in the 2026 sports action thriller Beast, alongside Crowe. MacPherson received the script in 2023 and underwent training in boxing, Muay Thai and Jiu Jitsu. He also gained 10kg of muscle for the role of MMA fighter Patton James.

== Other projects ==
MacPherson starred alongside Lightning in the pantomime Jack and the Beanstalk in 1999 at the Victoria Theatre in Halifax. He also starred in Cinderella (2000) and Aladdin (2001) at the Marlowe Theatre in Canterbury, alongside Paul Hendy and Leila Birch.

In 2006, MacPherson co-hosted the Sydney New Year's Eve 2006-07 telecast alongside Big Brother host Gretel Killeen. The telecast caused much controversy after former Big Brother 2004 housemates Ryan Fitzgerald and Bree Amer appeared to be drunk throughout their segments of the evening. Notably, MacPherson received much praise for being a "complete professional" and left with his reputation unscathed.

== Ironman competitor ==
MacPherson competes in World Triathlon Corporation (WTC) and Ironman 70.3. He competed in Ironman Australia at Port Macquarie, where he missed out on qualifying for the Ironman World Championship in Hawaii by only one spot. His swim time of 49:30 in Ironman New Zealand 2008 was the fastest in his age group. His fastest Ironman remains 9-hour and 42 minutes in Port Macquarie in 2007.

In April 2009, MacPherson completed the China Ironman in Haikou. He completed the race in 11 hours and one minute, after a 3.8 km swim, 180 km bike ride and 42 km run in 45C heat. He came first in his 25–29 age group, qualifying him for the Hawaiian Ironman in October. MacPherson competed in the Hawaiian Ironman in 2009, finishing in 10 hours and 25 minutes. He then won the amateur division of the LA Triathlon. MacPherson has twice qualified for the Ironman 70.3 world championships, in 2013 and 2014. During the 2014 Challenge Roth, MacPherson quit the marathon halfway through and decided to end his triathlon career.

== Personal life ==
In 2004, it was reported that MacPherson was in a relationship with Beth Cordingly, who was also his on-screen partner in the police procedural series The Bill.

He began dating his Wild Boys co-star Zoë Ventoura in 2011. They became engaged in December 2014, and married on the Sunshine Coast, Queensland in November 2015. The couple have one child, a son, born in December 2019. The pair announced their separation on social media in December 2020.

MacPherson was in a relationship with model Jessica Dover. Although neither has publicly confirmed the end of the relationship, the last "like" or mention each other on their respective social media accounts was in April 2026. Posts from July 2026 have no further "likes" or acknowledgement of each other, and each appears to have unfollowed the other's account.

== Filmography ==
=== Film ===
Year	Title	Role	Notes
2011	The Cup	Jason Oliver	
2015	Infini	Whit Carmichael	
2016	The Osiris Child: Science Fiction Volume One	Lt. Kane Sommerville	
2017	Generational Sins	Drew Caldwell	
2018	A Wrinkle in Time	Calvin's father	
2022	Poker Face	Sam McIntyre	
2024	Land of Bad	Colonel Packett	
2026	Beast	Patton James	

=== Television ===
Year	Title	Role	Notes
1998–2002,	Neighbours	Joel Samuels	Role specifically written for him
2003–2004	The Bill	PC Cameron Tait	
2006	Blackjack	Craig	
2006	Tripping Over	Ned	British/Australian six-part drama series
2007–2010	City Homicide	Simon Joyner	
2011	Wild Boys	Jack Keenan	
2015	Neighbours 30th: The Stars Reunite	Himself	Documentary
2016	The Shannara Chronicles	Arion	
2017	APB	Scott Murphy	
2017–2020	Strike Back	Samuel Wyatt	
2019	Bad Mothers	Anton	
2021	Foundation	Hugo Crast	

=== Stage ===
Year	Title	Role	Notes
1999	Jack and the Beanstalk	Jack	Victoria Theatre, Halifax, UK
2000	Cinderella	Prince	Marlowe Theatre, Canterbury, UK
2001	Aladdin	Aladdin	Marlowe Theatre, Canterbury, UK
2002	Godspell	Jesus/Judas	16-week, No. 1 venue tour, United Kingdom
2004	The Mysteries	Jesus	Canterbury Cathedral, UK, with Edward Woodward, Thomas James Longley and Joseph McManners
2005	Love Letters	Andrew	NIDA/Parade Theatre, Sydney
2023	2:22 A Ghost Story	Ben	Her Majesty's Theatre, Melbourne
2024	The Woman in Black	The Actor	Australian Tour

=== Host ===
Year	Title	Role	Notes
2005	The X Factor Australia	Host	Network Ten
2005	Good Morning Australia	Fill in Host	Network Ten
2005	Killer Shark	Documentary Host	Network Ten
2006	NYE Live Broadcast	Co-host	Network Ten
2006–2007	National Geographic Presents	Host	Foxtel
2008–2014	Dancing with the Stars	Host	Seven Network
2017	6th AACTA International Awards	Host	

== Awards and nominations ==
Year	Association	Category	Work	Result	Ref
1999	Logie Awards	Most Popular New Male Talent	Neighbours	Won	
2001	Logie Awards	Most Popular Actor	Neighbours	Nominated	
2003	National Television Awards	Most Popular Newcomer	The Bill	Nominated	
2012	Logie Awards	Most Popular Actor	Wild Boys	Nominated	

Preceded by Richard Wilkins	Sydney New Year's Eve host (with Gretel Killeen); 2006–07	Succeeded by Kim Watkins and Andrew G
