= Gabriel (2007 film) =

2007 Australian film by Shane Abbess

- Promotional film poster
- Directed by: Shane Abbess
- Written by: Shane Abbess; Matt Hylton Todd
- Produced by: Shane Abbess; Anna Cridland; Kristy Vernon
- Starring: Andy Whitfield; Dwaine Stevenson; Samantha Noble; Erika Heynatz; Michael Piccirilli
- Cinematography: Peter Holland
- Edited by: Adrian Rostirolla
- Music by: Brian Cachia
- Distributed by: Sony Pictures; Screen Corporation
- Release date: 15 November 2007
- Running time: 113 minutes
- Country: Australia
- Language: English
- Budget: A$150,000
- Box office: $1,462,320

Gabriel is a 2007 Australian action-horror film set in purgatory. It follows the archangel Gabriel's fight to rid purgatory of the evil fallen angels and save the souls of its inhabitants. Gabriel is the first feature directed by Shane Abbess, who also co-wrote the screenplay with Matt Hylton Todd. It stars Andy Whitfield as Gabriel, Dwaine Stevenson as Sammael, Samantha Noble as Amitiel, and Erika Heynatz as Lilith.

As an action film, Gabriel is unconventional by Australian film-making standards. Produced without government funding on a low budget, the filmmakers aimed to create a film that could compete in international markets and become financially profitable. Upon its Australian release on 15 November 2007, Gabriel received mixed reviews and came fifth in its opening-week box office. Gabriel was released on DVD in the U.S. on 19 February 2008.

== Plot ==
Since the beginning of time, Heaven and Hell have fought over Purgatory and the souls trapped inside it. Each side has sent seven warriors: archangels (Arcs) from Heaven, fallen angels (Fallen) from Hell. They must assume human form to enter purgatory. Hell has attained control, transforming purgatory into a dark, seedy city. The last of the seven archangels, Gabriel (Andy Whitfield), tries to discover what has become of his comrades and to restore the Light.

Upon Gabriel entering purgatory, four of the seven Fallen—Sammael (Dwaine Stevenson) who is the Fallen's leader, Asmodeus (Michael Piccirilli), Balan (Brendan Clearkin), and Baliel—gather, and Sammael kills an insubordinate Baliel, so reducing the Fallen's number from seven to six. Meanwhile, Gabriel visits the archangel Michael's apartment, finding it abandoned. He finds a note from Michael in the apartment, saying how hard it is to stay pure in purgatory. While walking through the city, Gabriel receives a vision about the whereabouts of his comrade Uriel (Harry Pavlidis). However, Sammael senses Gabriel's presence and sends the Fallen Molloch (Goran D. Kleut) to kill him. Gabriel fights and kills Molloch, then proceeds to the city's outskirts. He finds a dishevelled and alcoholic Uriel hiding in a rundown bus. He explains that the Archangels all assumed human form and became subject to human desires and feelings which weakened them. Cut off from their power, the Archangels were eventually worn down and fell prey to the Fallen, who throve in purgatory and became stronger the more time they spent there. He reveals to Gabriel that this is what eventually led to the downfall of the Arcs sent before him. Uriel warns Gabriel that if they die in purgatory, their own souls will die too, they completely vanish. To encourage and remind Uriel of his identity, Gabriel mortally wounds Uriel, convincing Uriel to heal himself. Though surely aware of Gabriel's presence, Sammael commands the Fallen to wait before taking any action against Gabriel, even though they could defeat Gabriel; Sammael threatens the Fallen if they do anything to Gabriel. Uriel then explains to Gabriel that the Fallen can sense Archangels when they use their powers, and teaches Gabriel to conceal his bright blue angel eyes. Uriel also explains that due to the nature of the evil and darkness that controls purgatory that Gabriel will be cut off from the "source". He also reluctantly tells Gabriel what happened to some of the other five Archangels: Remiel was killed before Uriel arrived; the whereabouts of Ithuriel (Matt Hylton Todd), Raphael (Jack Campbell), and Michael are uncertain, but Raphael is most likely hiding in the East Side of the city and it is thought that Sammael has killed Michael; and Amitiel (Samantha Noble), who now calls herself Jade, was defeated by Sammael, stripped of her wings, and forced to work as a prostitute. Hearing this, Gabriel goes off into the city to search for Amitiel.

Gabriel travels back to the city, and finds the brothel where Amitiel works. He also encounters Asmodeus, the Fallen who runs the brothel. Gabriel rescues Amitiel and kills the Fallen Balan who tries to rape her. He then heals her of the drugs she has been taking to dull the pain of her job. As Gabriel's use of power makes his presence known in purgatory, the Fallen grow weary and impatient of waiting. Amitiel takes Gabriel to the soup kitchen where the Archangel Ithuriel hides. Initially angry at Ithuriel for abandoning his mission of seeking out and destroying the Fallen, Gabriel eventually shows him compassion and understanding. Ithuriel takes Gabriel to the abandoned tunnels beneath the soup kitchen where the gravely wounded Raphael dwells. Gabriel heals Raphael, expending much of his strength. After rebuking Gabriel, Raphael explains that Sammael draws his immense power from the other Fallen. Gabriel proposes to take out the remaining Fallen one by one, before finally facing Sammael. Raphael is unconvinced, as Sammael has already killed the stronger angel Michael.

Gabriel fights and kills the Fallen Ahriman (Kevin Copeland), then returns to Michael's apartment where he sketches a picture of Amitiel. At the same time Gabriel begins his campaign against the Fallen, the Fallen Lilith (Erika Heynatz) kills Uriel, Asmodeus kills Ithuriel, and Sammael kills Raphael. Driven mad by anger, Gabriel's eyes turn bright brown, the colour of the Fallen. He returns to the brothel seeking revenge against Asmodeus, killing armed men behind hotel room doors. He eventually finds Asmodeus and discovers him with his nigh unconscious female sex slave, whom he's been forcibly surgically altering to make her facially identical to himself so as to satisfy his narcissism. Asmodeus uses Gabriel's shock and sympathy toward the girl to his advantage and assaults him. Gabriel gains the advantage in the fight, viciously scars Asmodeus, thus enraging him, and then kills him. Gabriel halts his own imminent fall when he heals and restores the captive young woman and returns her to her original appearance. Shocked by his near fall, Gabriel returns to Amitiel. Amitiel comforts Gabriel and they strip naked before having sex. Gabriel then travels to a nightclub and kills Lilith, injecting her with several full vials of Ahriman's drugs. Gabriel searches for Sammael and is soon attacked and knocked out by the last Fallen Angel. Upon recovering, he chases Sammael to the nightclub's rooftop.

Sammael refuses to fight Gabriel, instead asking him to listen to what he has to say. He explains how he despises being an angel, a being created entirely to serve others. He sees purgatory as a chance to take control of his own destiny and lets Gabriel know that it was him all along keeping Gabriel protected and alive in a city amongst all the Fallen, and asks Gabriel to join him. Refusing his offer, Gabriel unwittingly realises that "Sammael" is actually the Archangel Michael, his closest friend (who had actually killed the real Sammael and assumed his identity). Though Michael was the one responsible for the deaths of the other Archangels, the real Sammael was the one to force Jade to give up her wings. The two Archangels fight, but because Gabriel has used up so much of his strength helping the other Archangels, even with Michael similarly growing weaker, Gabriel proves to be no match for Michael who severely beats him down and ultimately impales Gabriel's chest with a metal pipe. Gabriel admits that during his time as a human he has felt rage and anger, but he has also experienced things that Michael hasn't. An impaled Gabriel embraces Michael, which drives the metal pipe through Michael's chest also, and tells Michael that he forgives him. Both Archangels collapse. Before dying, Michael uses what remains of his strength to save Gabriel's life, healing his wound. Light returns to purgatory.

Kneeling in front of Michael's dead body, Gabriel shouts up at God asking "Is It This That You Wanted? Is It This You Wanted?!" The healed Gabriel moves to the edge of the rooftop, and muses that he needs to understand why all this happened. He stretches out his arms, and lets himself fall. His final words are, "Forgive me... I hope I see you again ..." A post-credits scene shows Gabriel, (wearing different clothing, minus angel wing tattoo and with brown eyes), joining Amitiel and smiling. (The DVD version of the film does not contain the post-credit scene.)

== Production ==
=== Financing ===
Gabriel was made on a minuscule budget, even by Australian standards. Director Shane Abbess described the budget as "the catering budget on a Hollywood film." The film was shot for roughly A$150,000. However, everyone involved in the production worked on deferred payment, meaning that the actual cost of the film runs "well into the millions" once deferrals have been taken into account. In addition, the filmmakers used money from the international distribution rights to complete the film's post-production. Shane Abbess claims that Gabriel's official budget will eventually be announced on its DVD release in a two-hour behind-the-scenes special feature.

According to Abbess, finding funding for the film was "impossibly hard." The film was significantly funded out of the filmmakers' own pockets: Abbess worked as a building labourer, a removalist, at a call centre, and as a truck driver at the docks in order to raise the money to produce Gabriel. Five weeks into shooting, Abbess intended to return to his job as a removalist to raise more money to pay the caterers, but his old boss gave him a small sum of money to get the production over the line.

Preconceptions about what is an 'Australian film' contributed to the difficulty in finding funding. As an action film, Gabriel "defied the norm and went way outside convention." Producer Kristy Vernon states that "many Australia movies have been either driven by artistic or personal motivations or, have focused on cultural imperatives leading to 'uncommercial' movies being produced. These types of movies are unlikely to give off a reasonable return to investors. The consequence of this is that the Australian finance and investment sectors have been reluctant to support the funding of the movie industry." Abbess is critical of contemporary Australian films, joking that audiences "fall asleep" through them. He also believes there is a mentality in the Australian film industry to wait for government funding, rather than to earn and finance your own films. Everyone he spoke to about getting the film made said that, "even with a big, huge budget, you're not going to get this made out here." However, after he got one or two people on board support increased in a snowball effect.

Finding insurance for the film was also problematic. One day before filming was due to start the insurance company determined that the film was too risky, and tried to shut down production. Abbess struggled to find another company to insure the film, ultimately having to lie about the film's content to satisfy them (he claimed the film's dangerous climactic rooftop action scene was "all green screen"). The company agreed, but only after they tripled their original price. This meant that certain scenes had to be dropped from the production, though they were ultimately shot as pick-ups.

=== Development ===
Abbess's initial idea for the film was his fondness for the name 'Gabriel.' He and co-writer Matt Hylton Todd researched angels and demons in various religions, drawing figures from Christianity, Judaism, Zoroastrianism, and Islam as well as John Milton's Paradise Lost. The writers chose their favourite seven angels and favourite seven demons to create an "all-star" supernatural battle. Abbess says, "There hadn't really been a movie about angels. Not like this. I hadn't even seen Constantine at the time, nor the one with Christopher Walken (The Prophecy) in it, so as far as I knew—and, anyway, this is very different from those—it hadn't been done before." The writers were interested in the backstory and mythology of purgatory, and aimed to focus more on the characters than the special effects. Gabriel was deliberately designed to be commercial and "franchiseable." It was written as the first part of a trilogy, and, if financially successful, will be followed by two sequels that will explore the world outside purgatory.

Gabriel was written in the style of action and science fiction movies from the 1980s and early '90s. This was partly because Shane Abbess was influenced by that era of cinema during his youth and partly because the minuscule budget demanded that the film couldn't be laden with special effects. Abbess cites the films Alien, Predator and Die Hard as influences. He describes cinema of that era as, "because CG effects weren't huge yet, the whole thing had to be about characters; had to be things you could believe in." Abbess also stated that he "did kinda of want to make one giant cliché." Abbess also intended the film to emulate the intentionally "jumbled quality" of 1980s cinema.

=== Design ===
Production designer Victor Lam drew the storyboards for Gabriel and oversaw every design aspect of the film. His job involved keeping the overall 'feel' of the film cohesive, and "making sure that it sits with Shane's direction and making sure that, colour-wise, tonally, it actually fits as well." Because of the small budget, Lam's designs had to be extremely budget conscious. The art department collected props from "the local tip and thrift shops," and costumes were bought second-hand from St Vincent de Paul. In addition, they saved money on set building and space rental by using abandoned industrial locations and condemned buildings soon to be demolished as sets. An advantage to this approach was that it added a layer of realism to the production. The disadvantage was that it restricted where director Shane Abbess could place the camera. Abbess crammed the camera into corners to shoot scenes.

The set Lam is most proud of is one of the Fallen's underground lairs. To dress this set, Lam and his team hung fences, fake blood and plastic chains painted to look metallic around an abandoned shooting stage in Gore Hill, Sydney. Lam says, "The lead actor just came up and went, 'Wow, that's really cool!' And we said, 'Yeah! And it cost us nothing!'" Shane Abbess instructed the art department to include much fake blood and gore; Lam describes this as "video game influence." He also acknowledges that his work has a strong comic book influence. Some of the art department work didn't make it into the final film. Lam and his team built a large sculpture made of hessian and chicken wire, and though "it looked really good" and fitted "really well with the whole theme of Gabriel," it wasn't used in the film.

=== Filming ===
The film was shot on location in Sydney over a period of eight weeks in late 2005, plus a week of pick-ups in March 2006. The production team consisted of many experienced Australian filmmakers who had worked on major Hollywood productions filmed in Australia. The lighting crews had worked on Superman Returns and The Matrix, while the stunt coordinator, Kyle Rowling, had worked on Star Wars Episodes II and III. In order to better target international audiences, Shane Abbess directed the cast to use not necessarily full-blown American accents, but "neutral" accents.

Gabriel was shot on a JVC GY-HD101E digital video camera. Abbess praised the JVC's versatility, small size and its ability to shoot at night. Another crucial advantage to digital video was its cheapness: "Ten years ago, we couldn't have made this movie, because we would have had to shoot on film. It would have been as boring as bat shit, because we would only have had money to shoot a wide shot and two close ups before moving on. I got so much better coverage shooting it this way."

The deferred payment plan caused friction between the filmmakers and some of the extras, who demanded immediate payment after their two nights on set "or basically we're going to kill you." The lack of money forced Abbess to innovate ways to shoot scenes that he wouldn't have normally done. The scene in which Balan is killed is an example of this. Abbess ran out of time to film this scene using conventional techniques, so positioned the camera at the end of the hallway and used "crash zooms… in and out of the action" to highlight the key moments. Abbess studied other low-budget films like Requiem for a Dream and Donnie Darko to identify ways the filmmakers worked around their small budgets.

Physical effects were also created cheaply. Instead of using expensive rain towers, the rain featured in the film's climactic scenes was created simply using hoses and unheated water. This meant that one night of production had to be wrapped three hours early because lead actor Andy Whitfield became hypothermic: his temperature dropped to 32.5 degrees Celsius (90.5 degrees Fahrenheit). Abbess described this as the hardest scene to shoot. Initially intending to make Gabriel without computer-generated effects, Abbess also tried to reproduce bullet time on a low budget by using giant props on strings, though he eventually decided CGI were more successful.

The style of fighting in Gabriel was intended to be a "stylised version of pub brawling." Shane Abbess intended for each of Gabriel's successive fights with the Fallen to be "a whole different experience," and strove to shoot each one differently. The lack of time meant there was little time for the performers to rehearse fight scenes: Andy Whitfield says that some fight scenes were rehearsed for only "three minutes before the cameras rolled." The hallway fight between Gabriel and Asmodeus was an example of this; the actors learned and executed a 98-move fight sequence in only an hour. Abbess states that stunt co-ordinator Kyle Rowling was "instrumental" to the quality of the action scenes.

=== Post-production ===
The first cut of Gabriel was "self indulgent" and three hours long. This version was screened for some executives in Hollywood who recommended that film be cut down to under two hours "because we're an MTV audience these days." In mid-2006 when the edit was "working really well" the filmmakers chose to show it to Sony Pictures Australia. Abbess chose Sony particularly because of their subsidiary Screen Gems; he believes "they knew how to handle films like Hostel and Underworld." Sony picked Gabriel up for international release. The filmmakers used the money from this deal to complete the editing process and the film's effects. The filmmakers chose to assemble a team of freelancers rather than hire an effects company. The team completed 805 effects shots on a budget Sony had estimated would only cover six. Four months were spent completing the sound design.

== Casting ==
Shane Abbess believes that "he couldn't ask for a better cast." He tried to cast actors who were unknown, both internationally and within Australia. In addition, he aimed for "a very international feel," intending that audiences would look at the cast and say, "They belong on the big cinema screen anywhere in the world." He requested that Casting Director Faith Martin avoid anyone who "reminded people of a soap opera." Despite this, two of the cast have appeared in Australian soap Home and Away: Michael Piccirilli appeared as Dr James Fraser during the late nineties, and Amy Mathews (Maggie) began her stint as Rachel Armstrong while shooting her role for Gabriel. Erika Heynatz "wasn't anyone" when she was cast in the role of Lilith, but became well known after winning the 2006 series of It Takes Two. Producer Kristy Vernon states that even if the film had more money, "we probably would still have gone with somebody unknown, because part of doing this movie was making it fresh and new and something different."

Lead actor Andy Whitfield was initially hesitant to audition because he and his wife had just had a baby, and because he would have to accept deferred payment. His agent compelled him to consider the role as it was a lead in a feature film: "What you've always wanted to do." Whitfield auditioned without any expectations of getting the role, which meant "he didn't really care as much" and he was free to "go for it, and go nuts" without any pressure. After getting the role, it was his wife who encouraged him to accept it by telling him it would be an inspiring thing to tell his son.

=== Characters ===
- Andy Whitfield as Gabriel: A committed and respected Archangel, Gabriel is occasionally reckless and stubborn. He aspires to emulate his stronger and wiser mentor, Michael. Whitfield was drawn to the character because "everything and anything seems possible and yet he is so utterly inexperienced to deal with even the most harmless of humans." Initially confident that he could pull off the role "his" way, throughout filming Abbess pushed Whitfield to "go to places that I would normally choose not to go to." This is Whitfield's first feature role.
- Dwaine Stevenson as "Sammael"/Michael: The most feared and faithful Fallen, Michael seeks control of the city to challenge what he calls a lack of freedom in the followers of the Light. Stevenson was attracted to the character's difficulties, finding the role confronting and challenging. He describes playing the role as "a very intimidating process and a lonely one. Each day I turned up to set, and began getting dressed, I could almost feel the character laughing at me saying, 'Well, let's see what you get today.'" One critic summarised his impression of the character as "Trent Reznor of Nine Inch Nails wearing ping-pong balls as contact lenses."
- Samantha Noble as Amitiel/Jade: Amitiel is the stealth assassin of the Archangels, valued for her ability to nurture and heal more than her skills in combat. As Jade, a hooker with a heart of gold, she falls in love with Gabriel, tempting him to abandon his quest. Noble was drawn to the character because she "fell in love with her strength and veracity along with her sadness and vulnerability." Different from the roles Noble is usually cast in, the role involved much "reacting and listening rather than driving and manipulating."
- Erika Heynatz as Lilith: One of the Fallen, Lilith has a strong hatred of men. She is "driven by undiluted instinct and spiritual force." Heynatz states she was "inspired to find out where the character draws her power from, what fuels her, threatens her, and how she maintains her control. I also liked the idea of examining the idea of dominance and subservience." Heynatz found the "clear and consistent direction" from Director Shane Abbess and co-writer Matt Hylton Todd "new and empowering."
- Harry Pavlidis as Uriel: Uriel is the diplomat of the Archangels, preferring truce to conflict. After being corrupted by purgatory, Uriel runs away from the city and lives as a hermit. The Sydney Morning Herald review of Gabriel made special mention of Harry Pavlidis's Uriel, labelling him a "scene stealer."
- Jack Campbell as Raphael: Known for his leadership skills, the Archangel Raphael is impeded from fighting the war in purgatory only after he receives a near fatal bullet wound. Campbell has had recurring roles on the Australian television show All Saints and the New Zealand soap opera City Life.
- Michael Piccirilli as Asmodeus: Vain, playful, and perverted, Asmodeus chooses to remain Fallen in order to satisfy his carnal desires. The Sydney Morning Herald offered particular praise for Piccirilli's performance, calling the psychopathic narcissist "genuinely unsettling."
- Matt Hylton Todd as Ithuriel: Ithuriel is a kind hearted and compassionate Archangel, but doesn't believe himself strong enough to fight the Dark. He chooses to open a soup kitchen as a way to reach out to the souls in purgatory. Matt Hylton Todd is also the co-writer of the film.
- Kevin Copeland as Ahriman: The Fallen Ahriman quarrels with Sammael over strategy: where Sammael recommends patience, Ahriman proposes to hunt down and kill Gabriel immediately. Ahriman runs a drug making factory.
- Brendan Clearkin as Balan: The Fallen Balan is sadistic; he beats and tries to rape Amitiel.
- Goran D. Kleut as Molloch: The Fallen Moloch fights Gabriel on orders from Sammael.

== Release ==
Sony Pictures Entertainment is distributing Gabriel, both within Australia and internationally. Sony initially wanted to release Gabriel in the U.S. before the rest of the world, but Shane Abbess fought so the film would come to Australia first. Its Australian premiere was at The Entertainment Quarter, Sydney on 7 November 2007, while its general Australian release was on 15 November. Before its premiere, excerpts from the film were shown at the 2007 Supanova Pop Culture Expo in Sydney. Gabriel received an 'M' rating from the Australian Office of Film and Literature Classification with the consumer advice "moderate violence, coarse language, drug use and sexual references." Initially rumoured to have a U.S. release during January or February 2008, Gabriel's U.S. DVD was released on 19 February 2008.

== Reception ==
Gabriel received mixed reviews upon release. In general, its visual style and technical achievements on such a low budget were praised, while its stilted dialogue and unoriginal storyline were criticised. Leading Australian film critic Margaret Pomeranz enjoyed the film, stating that while "there's nothing amazingly deep about it," it has "an amazingly interesting look and sound." In contrast, David Stratton, Pomeranz's co-presenter from At the Movies, described the film as "tedious," deriding its dialogue, "derivative" story and uninteresting characters. Sydney Morning Herald reviewer Richard Jinman concurred with Stratton's assessment, stating that the "cliched aesthetic ... is a turn-off, as is the rather stilted dialogue." He went on to write that Gabriel is "hamstrung by a lack of visceral thrills, engaging characters and a storyline that can command attention for almost two hours." Michael Adams from The Movie Show gave Gabriel "an 'A' for Ambition;" Adams admitted that some of the action is "clever" and many of the performances "solid," but found the overall film mediocre. Urban Cinefile's review was largely positive, calling the film "visually arresting" and "exciting."

Many critics addressed Gabriel's similarity to other films. Stratton asserted the film borrowed themes from Night Watch and Day Watch, and had the look of Underworld or a poor man's The Matrix. Adams noted the film's debt to Blade Runner, while Jinman compared the film's aesthetic to Mad Max and 1980s music videos.

=== Box office ===
Gabriel grossed approximately A$656,000 in its Australian opening week, ranking fifth at the Australian box office. Gabriel's opening-week gross represented the second-highest for an Australian-made film released in 2007, behind Rogue which opened the previous week with approximately A$667,000. In its opening weekend, Gabriel opened on 98 screens and averaged $4,797 per screen, the third-highest per-screen average of the top 20 grossing films for the weekend. The Age journalist Jim Schembri described Gabriel's opening week as "impressive," writing that "The gloom-laden film may not be for all tastes, but it looks like it's hitting the right spots with its intended audience of goths, emos and people who have trouble sleeping at night." In its five weeks playing in theatres, Gabriel grossed $1,462,320. Gabriel's earnings ranked it at 110th among all the 295 films released in Australia in 2007.

== See also ==
- List of films about angels
