= Sarah Lian =

Malaysian actress and television personality

- Born: Sarah Lian Lay Ting; 12 May 1983 (age 43); Taiping, Perak, Malaysia
- Occupations: Actress; television host
- Years active: 2007 – present
- Website: sarahlian.com

Sarah Lian
- Traditional Chinese: 連麗婷
- Simplified Chinese: 连丽婷
Transcriptions
Standard Mandarin
- Hanyu Pinyin: Lián Lìtíng
Yue: Cantonese
- Jyutping: Lin4 Lai6 Ting4
Southern Min
- Hokkien POJ: Liân Lê-têng
- Tâi-lô: Liân Lê-tîng

Sarah Lian (Chinese: 连丽婷; born 12 May 1983), is a Malaysian actress and television personality based in Kuala Lumpur, Malaysia. She was born in Taiping, Perak Malaysia but mainly grew up in Vancouver, British Columbia, Canada. Lian is an actor versatile in film, television and theatre. Currently, her entertainment career spans across North America and Asia. Lian gained fame when she was voted FHM Malaysia's No. 1 Most Wanted Woman on their Top 100 list.

== Personal life ==
Of Chinese heritage; both parents being Chinese Malaysian, Lian is the third of four children in her family. Living in a multilingual country and moving abroad, it is no surprise that she speaks a variety of languages. While proficient in English, Lian also speaks Hokkien, Cantonese, Mandarin, Malay, French and a smattering of Japanese.

Lian has lived in California, Hong Kong, Vancouver, and Toronto before moving to Kuala Lumpur in 2008.

Lian holds an undergraduate Bachelor of Design degree in Fashion Communications from Ryerson University (now Toronto Metropolitan University). She has a fascination with product packaging and typography. Lian is a self-taught web designer and is frequently updating and designing her own website.

A huge fan of the durian fruit, Lian claims that it is one of the reasons why she moved back to Malaysia; another was a lack of satisfying job offers. However, in an interview, Lian stated she would return temporarily to Canada in March 2011 to pursue bigger opportunities in film and television.

== Career in Hosting ==
In 2007, Lian first hosted a show for college students in Canada called UTours. UTours was a resource for students interested in the Top 20 Universities. Schools covered by Lian were University of Victoria, University of British Columbia, Simon Fraser University, University of Waterloo, Wilfrid Laurier University, Ryerson University, York University and The University of Western Ontario.

In 2008, Lian moved to Malaysia and began working closely with Media Prima's online portal gua.com.my for their event-based show, Randommania.

The program gave Lian the opportunity to interview various personalities from local artiste Maya Karin, Fasha Sandha and Ning Baizura to international musicians such as Shayne Ward, The D.E.Y. and Machi.

As she became closely associated with GuaTV; this entertainment program escalated Lian as a recognisable face in the media world, also making her known as one of Gua's Homegrown Hotties!

At the same time, she was also enlisted as the host and writer for Ntv7's informative program NUVO-where popular Taiwanese boy band Fahrenheit specifically flew down to Kuala Lumpur collaborate on their endorsement with Canon IXUS.

In October 2008, The Ultimate Prom Nite (Season 2) a Malaysian reality TV series produced by Primeworks Studios in co-operation with skincare maker Nivea kicked off. Lian co-hosted the program with Hansen Lee. The inter-campus prom night aimed at seeking students in various colleges and universities throughout Malaysia who were worthy to be crowned the "Ultimate Prom King and Queen". The following year in 2009, Lian worked on 8TV's first-online reality show Simply Fabulous by Maybelline, which was featured on 23 webisodes and its finale broadcast on television.

In early 2010, Lian hosted a mobile travel guide "Ask Ting Ting" for travellers visiting the city of Hong Kong. She then returned to Kuala Lumpur in September 2010 to join ESPN's sport gossip program MyEG Xtra Time with co-hosts Marion Caunter, Cheryl Samad and Lisa Surihani. Since November 2010, Lian is hosting Astro Hitz Radar, an hour-long talk show on music channel Astro hitz. The program previews upcoming movie trailers, discusses trends, highlights events around town and showcases exclusive live performances from local acts.

In 2015, Lian started expanding out of Malaysia and into Singapore with her first regional program Photo Face-Off on History Channel Asia as host of the reality competition in search between the professional American photographer Justin Mott and the amateur photographers in Southeast Asia, namely Singapore, Malaysia, Thailand, Vietnam, Indonesia and Philippines.

Lian has been invited to emcee major events including 8TV's Shout! Awards 2010, Homegrown tribute to Michael Jackson, Johnnie Walker Black Circuit Party and many of the Hennessy Artistry parties featuring international acts such as Kardinal Offishall, the Ying Yang Twins and Fatman Scoop, who have performed in Kuala Lumpur. She has also hosted with special guests like Shah Rukh Khan, Jay Park. and Paris Hilton.

== Career in Acting ==
Lian has been acting from the age of 10. With numerous plays and productions under her belt from community productions, she made her professional debut in the Vancouver Asian Canadian Theatre's production of Sex in Vancouver: Episode One-Deceptions and Reflections in August 2003. Sex in Vancouver (created by Serin Ngai and Kathy Hsieh) was an adapted version of Sex in Seattle. Lian played Elizabeth, one of four lead roles in this Asian-centric production.

While finishing her degree in Toronto, Lian earned her first credit in the American Pie film franchise, American Pie Presents: Beta House featured as the "Hot Asian Girl". Although Lian was shot in the movie in July 2007, her scene did not make the final cut upon the film's release in December 2007.

In August 2007, Lian also worked on the pilot episode of Home and Garden Network (HGTV Canada)'s newly launched series Mansions as the stern designer for the Fall 2008 line up. Mansions;reality-based show, unveiled the realities of luxury residential construction where viewers would discover how multimillion-dollar homes are designed and built, from rough sketches to jaw-dropping completion.

In Malaysia, Lian began working on a spoof-comedy news program called The Gua Centre in April 2008. She worked alongside actors and hosts Douglas Lim, Razif Hashim, Zalfian Fuzi, and Hansen Lee. Lian played the overly sensual reporter Fanny Golightly.

In 2009, Lian has been featured in a cameo-appearance as Miss Chic-Kut-Teh alongside actress Adibah Noor in Liew Seng Tat's short film Halal for 15Malaysia (a Malaysian Filmmaker's Showcase by P1 WiMAX).

In 2012, Lian was cast in CSI creator Anthony E. Zuiker's Yahoo! distributed cybercrime drama Cybergeddon as edgy hacker Blue. Later on that year, she played alongside Stuart Townsend as his love interest in the second season of XIII: The Series. Plus Covert Affairs with Piper Perabo.

2015 saw the release of Lian's two Hong Kong-shot independent films; psychological thriller Jasmine by Dax Phelan, and romantic comedy Already Tomorrow in Hong Kong by Emily Ting with actors Jamie Chung and Bryan Greenberg.

In 2016, Lian makes her Singapore acting debut on MediaCorp's 13-episode drama as the mysterious character Selena. Her other co-stars with veterans Tay Ping Hui, Irene Ang and Carmen Soo. The following year, Lian acts in her first Mandarin-speaking role in Astro's 6-part mini series, Anak Merdeka chronicling a story of 3 friends through the decades of Malaysia's Independence. She plays the role of the main character's mother in the first two episodes speaking English, Mandarin, Hokkien and Malay.

Lian has also been featured in a range of commercials shot for various countries. Among those include a couple advertisements McCafe and Standard Chartered-shot with Hong Kong TVB actor Moses Chan, Adidas' 2003 FIFA Women's World Cup Shaolin Soccer commercial featuring players from Team China and Team USA, Cadbury Soft Centres, Tic Tac, Hong Leong Bank, and Celcom Euro 2008. In Malaysia, Lian has been applauded for her role as "Ah Moi" in the localised myEG commercial in 2010. In 2014, Lian filmed a Tiger Beer commercial with Cannes-winning Singaporean director Anthony Chen.

== Filmography ==
=== Films ===
Year	Film	Role	Notes
2007	American Pie Presents: Beta House	Hot Asian Girl	Minor role
2009	15Malaysia: Halal	Beauty Pageant	Cameo
2015	Jasmine	Anna	Supporting Role
2015	It's Already Tomorrow in Hong Kong	Monica	Supporting Role
2017	Get Hard	Fenny	Supporting Lead
2019	Fly By Night		Supporting Lead

=== Television ===
Year	Film	Role	Notes
2008	The Ultimate Prom Nite	Host	5 episodes
2009	Maybelline's Simply Fabulous	Host	26 episodes
2009	Homegrown: Michael Jackson Tribute	Host	Variety Show Special on 8TV (Malaysia)
2009	Sayang Sayang 2	TVC Girl	1 episode
2010	Mister French Taste	Lily Lee	6 episodes
2010	ESPN myeg Xtra Time	Host	26 episodes
2010	Astro Hitz Radar	Host	12 episodes
2010	Shout! Awards	Co-Host	Shout! Awards 2010
2012	Cold Blood 5	Asian Victim	1 episode
2012	Covert Affairs	Tech Op	1 episode
2012	Cybergeddon	Blue	2 episodes
2012	XIII: The Series	Ai Ning	2 episodes
2013	"What If"	Assassin	1 episode
2015	Photo Face-Off Season 2	Host	6 episodes
2016	The Hush	Selena	12 episodes
2016	"Luxe Asia"	Host	8 episodes on Channel NewsAsia
2017	Anak Merdeka	Betty	2 episodes
2017	BRA	Pei Ling	1 episode
2020	TechFest 2020	Host	Live Broadcast on Astro (television)
