= Shane Abbess =

Australian filmmaker

Shane Abbess is an Australian filmmaker best known for making the movies Gabriel and Infini.

For a time, he was attached to direct Source Code and The Dark Crystal 2.

== Filmography ==
Year	Title	Director	Writer	Producer
2007	Gabriel	Yes	Yes	Yes
2015	Infini	Yes	Yes	Yes
2016	The Osiris Child: Science Fiction Volume One	Yes	Yes	Yes
2027	Milfhammer: The Movie	Yes	Yes	Yes
TBA	Black Sunday	No	Yes	Yes

Executive producer

- Terminus (2015)
- Better Watch Out (2016)
- Beast (2026)
