= James Spruill (actor) =

- Born: United States
- Died: United States
- Occupations: Actor, theater teacher

James Spruill was an American actor and theater teacher, with New African Company, Spruill brought out plays highlighting the black experience.

Spruill was a theater teacher at Boston University for 30 years and an actor who shared the stage with Morgan Freeman and Al Pacino.

His students at Boston University included Jason Alexander. In 1980, Alexander performed with Spruill in Boston University's production of Othello.
