= Infini =

2015 Australian science fiction drama film directed by Shane Abbess

- Film poster
- Directed by: Shane Abbess
- Screenplay by: Shane Abbess
- Story by: Shane Abbess; Brian Cachia
- Produced by: Sidonie Abbene; Shane Abbess; Matthew Graham; Brett Thornquest
- Starring: Daniel MacPherson; Grace Huang; Luke Hemsworth
- Cinematography: Carl Robertson
- Edited by: Adrian Rostirolla
- Music by: Brian Cachia
- Distributed by: Vertical Entertainment
- Release date: 11 April 2015
- Running time: 110 minutes
- Country: Australia
- Language: English
- Budget: $5 million

Infini is a 2015 Australian science fiction film directed by Shane Abbess and starring Daniel MacPherson, Grace Huang, and Luke Hemsworth.

== Plot ==
In the early 23rd century, an emergency is declared on a mining station O.I. Infini and a search and rescue (SAR) team is sent in using Slipstream, a form of teleportation that allows near instantaneous travel. The location of O.I. Infini is proximal to a number of black holes meaning the mission operatives will experience severe time dilation. A team sent returns 30 seconds later in a berserk rage. Whit Carmichael, a new member of West Coast SAR, on his first day, teleports to Infini using an illegal teleporter after West Coast HQ activates a lethal lock down to contain the crisis. Before leaving for work that day, his pregnant wife tells him to do whatever it takes to return safely.

Less than a relative hour later, East Coast SAR is informed about the outbreak and the destruction of the West Coast SAR. They are informed a payload of something from the station has been programmed by a deranged survivor to teleport to Earth soon, which will destroy the planet. The SAR is ordered to halt the payload and recover the one surviving member of the West Coast SAR, Whit. Arriving, they find a frozen slaughterhouse, eventually reuniting with Whit, who has had a week to figure out how the station operates. Whit explains that the mining staff slaughtered each other, tearing off their skin and killing one another. Whit is able to shut down the payload, but the deranged survivor suddenly attacks. Everyone is sprayed with the survivor's blood after he is shot and they become violently enraged. Whit hides from the others, then searches the station for remaining SAR personnel and anything he can learn about the infection. Finding a lab, he discovers a medical log that reveals the planet is entirely composed of alien organic material that when thawed forms a so-called "primordial ooze". It is capable of infecting, mimicking, and finally dominating any biological tissue. He further discovers the ooze is aggressive, predatory in nature, and driven by self-preservation.

Suffering mentally from infection, Whit attempts to solicit help from the remaining members of the team, but they are suffering through advanced stages of the infection, which he is resisting better. They either attack each other, kill themselves, or attack Whit. This leaves Whit the last surviving human on the station. He records a message to the ooze which plays on a loop over the loudspeakers, criticizing it for harnessing only the violent instincts of humanity, instead of working with humans. He tells it that it failed and commits suicide. The ooze moves onto the bodies, and they awaken unharmed and no longer crazed, but clearly disturbed by what has happened. They agree to teleport back and keep their story simple. As they begin to teleport, Whit sees several humanoid forms made of ooze, silently watching them go. One of them holds the picture of Whit's wife he carried with him.

Returning to Earth, the team is scanned and asked if they are free from biological contaminants. They answer in the affirmative, and the scan clears them all. Whit returns home to his wife, who had been told he was not coming back.

== Cast ==
- Daniel MacPherson as Whit Carmichael
- Grace Huang as Claire Grenich
- Luke Hemsworth as Charlie Kent
- Luke Ford as Chester Huntington
- Bren Foster as Morgan Jacklar
- Dwaine Stevenson as Rex Mannings
- Harry Pavlidis as Harris Menzies
- Louisa Mignone as Philipa Boxen
- Kevin Copeland as Seet Johanson
- Richard Huggett as Montoli
- Tess Haubrich as Lisa Carmichael
- Matt Minto as The Chief
- Andy Rodoreda as Sefton Norick
- Paul Winchester as David Ponter
- Brendan Clearkin as Depot Sergeant Hackford
- Richard Maait as Matson
- Damon Manna as Father

== Production ==
Shooting began in Sydney in October 2013.

== Release ==
Infini had its international premiere on 11 April 2015 at the Brussels International Fantastic Film Festival. It was released simultaneously in the US and Australia. The film was not released theatrically in Australia, due to fears of piracy.

== Reception ==
Rotten Tomatoes, a review aggregator, reports that 31% of 16 surveyed critics gave the film a positive review; the average rating is 4.73/10. Dov Kornits of the Australian magazine Filmink wrote, "Infini is leading the charge in genre filmmaking in this country, proving that we have the chops to compete on the world stage." Commenting on the film's similarity to Aliens, David Stratton of The Australian wrote, "Resourcefulness is all very well, but a fresh approach to the familiar cliches would also be appreciated." Harry Windsor of The Hollywood Reporter called it "a genre retread in search of a plot". Andrew Marshall of Starburst rated it 6/10 stars and wrote that the film "lacks the follow through to capitalise on its ideas or required sense of humanity to make you actually care". Simon Abrams of The Village Voice wrote, "Infini doesn't go anywhere that superior science fiction films haven't already, but for a while, it's exciting enough to feel brand-new." Oliver Pfeiffer of SciFiNow rated it 4/5 stars and called it "bold, gut-wrenching" with the "real masterstroke at play...the menacingly immersive production design and deeply atmospheric soundtrack". Christopher Webster of Quiet Earth wrote that it "feels like an R-rated Twilight Zone episode more than a feature film".
