= The Newton Brothers =

American music composition team

- Origin: United States
- Genres: Film and television scores, ambient, electronic, EDM, synthwave, electronic rock, hard rock
- Occupations: Film and television composers, conductors, record producers, multi-instrumentalists
- Instruments: Piano, organ, keyboards, synthesizer, guitar, bass guitar, percussion, clarinet, flute, saxophone, accordion, kazoo, cello
- Years active: 2007–present
- Members: John Andrew Grush; Taylor Newton Stewart
- Website: thenewtonbrothers.com

John Andrew Grush and Taylor Newton Stewart, known collectively as the Newton Brothers, are American composers, record producers, and multi-instrumentalists. Their works include scores for several films with director Mike Flanagan, having composed for every project of his since Oculus (2013), as well as various other films and television series. Despite the name, they are not related.

== Career ==
Early on in their lives, both Grush and Stewart were inspired to combine music and visuals and seek a career in film composition. They are both accomplished musicians and multi-instrumentalists who can play piano, guitar, bass, clarinet, flute, accordion, saxophone, harmonica, percussion, organ, kazoo and cello. Together they apprenticed under Hans Zimmer and co-scored the Mike Flanagan thriller Before I Wake with Danny Elfman.

The Newton Brothers have been scoring feature films together for over a decade, breaking into the mainstream with their work on Tony Kaye's film Detachment. In 2013 they began their work in horror films with Mike Flanaghan and Blumhouse Productions including Oculus, which The Irish Times said, "Andy and Taylor Newton's dynamic combination of simple melodic fragments, aleatory noise (broken glass, metal scrapes) and a solemn choir gradually inject the seriously spooky Oculus with nerve-shredding suspense and skin-crawling dread," and Ouija: Origin of Evil. They have since gone on to score multiple horror genre projects for film and television.

== Filmography ==
Year	Title	Director(s)	Studio	Notes
2010	High School	John Stalberg Jr.	Anchor Bay Films	
2011	Detachment	Tony Kaye	Tribeca Film	
2011	Magic Man	Stuart Cooper	Raskin Productions/Hollywood Storm	
2011	Revolucion	Rodrigo Garcia	Canana Films/Instituto Mexicano de Cinematografia/Mantarraya Producciones	
2012	Diving Normal	Kristjan Thor	Round One Production	
2013	Catch Hell	Ryan Phillippe	Palm Star Media/Twisted Pictures	
2013	Hair Brained	Billy Kent	Love Lane Pictures	
2013	Pawn Shop Chronicles	Wayne Kramer	Anchor Bay Films	
2013	Proxy	Zach Parker	Along the Tracks/FSC Productions	
2013	Chloe and Theo	Ezna Sands	Arctica Films	
2014	Careful What You Wish For	Liz Allen	Troika Pictures/Hyde Park Entertainment/Merced Media Partners/Amasia Entertainment/Roberi Media	
2014	Life of Crime	Dan Schecter	Lionsgate/Roadside Attractions	
2014	Oculus	Mike Flanagan	Relativity	First collaboration with Flanagan
2014	See No Evil 2	The Soska Sisters	Lionsgate	
2014	The Prince	Brian A. Miller	Lionsgate	
2014	The Road Within	Gren Wells	Troika	
2015	Before I Wake	Mike Flanagan	Relativity	Second collaboration with Flanagan
2015	Chasing Life	Various	ABC	
2015	The Runner	Austin Stark	Alchemy	
2015	Vendetta	The Soska Sisters	Lionsgate	
2016	Amateur Night	Lisa Addario & Joe Syracuse	Cinedigm	
2016	Blood in the Water	Ben Cummings & Orson Cummings	Level 33 Entertainment/SSS Entertainment/levelFILM	
2016	Hush	Mike Flanagan	Blumhouse	Third collaboration with Flanagan
2016	Ouija: Origin of Evil	Mike Flanagan	Universal Pictures/Blumhouse	Fourth collaboration with Flanagan
2016	Urge	Aaron Kaufman	Lionsgate	
2017	Dirk Gently's Holistic Detective Agency	Various	BBC	
2017	Gerald's Game	Mike Flanagan	Intrepid Pictures	Fifth collaboration with Flanagan
2017	Open Water 3: Cage Dive	Gerald Rescionato	Lionsgate	
2017	The Bye Bye Man	Stacy Title	STX	
2018	Escape Plan 2: Hades	Steven C. Miller	Lionsgate	
2018	Falling Water	Various	Universal/USA	
2018	The Body	Paul Davis	Blumhouse Television	
2018	The Haunting of Hill House	Mike Flanagan	Paramount/Amblin/Intrepid Pictures	Sixth collaboration with Flanagan
2019	Mary	Michael Goi	RLJE Films	
2019	Doctor Sleep	Mike Flanagan	Warner Bros. Pictures	Seventh collaboration with Flanagan
2019	Line of Duty	Steven C. Miller	Saban Films/Lionsgate	
2019	The Grudge	Nicolas Pesce	Sony Pictures Releasing	
2020	The Haunting of Bly Manor	Mike Flanagan	Paramount/Amblin/Intrepid Pictures	Eighth collaboration with Flanagan
2020–2021	The Walking Dead: World Beyond	Various	Skybound Entertainment, AMC Studios	
2021	The God Committee	Austin Stark	Crystal City Entertainment/Paper Street Films/Phiphen Pictures	
2021	The Forever Purge	Everardo Gout	Universal Pictures/Perfect World Pictures/Blumhouse	
2021	Midnight Mass	Mike Flanagan	Intrepid Pictures	Ninth collaboration with Flanagan
2021–2023	Joe Pickett	Various	Spectrum Originals/Paramount+	
2022	The Midnight Club	Mike Flanagan	Intrepid Pictures	Tenth collaboration with Flanagan
2022-present	The Devil's Hour	Various	Hartswood Films/Amazon Studios	
2023	Prom Pact	Anya Adams	Disney Channel	
2023	The Fall of the House of Usher	Mike Flanagan	Intrepid Pictures	Eleventh collaboration with Flanagan
2023–2025	Goosebumps	Rob Letterman and Nicholas Stoller	Hulu/Disney+/Original Film/Scholastic Entertainment/Sony Pictures Television Studios	
2023	Five Nights at Freddy's	Emma Tammi	Universal Pictures/Blumhouse	
2024–present	X-Men '97	Jake Castorena, Emi Yonemura, and Chase Conley	Disney+/Marvel Studios Animation	
2024	Shelby Oaks	Chris Stuckmann	Paper Street Pictures/Intrepid Pictures	
2024	The Life of Chuck	Mike Flanagan	Intrepid Pictures	Twelfth collaboration with Flanagan
2024	Werewolves	Steven C. Miller	Briarcliff Entertainment	
2025–present	Daredevil: Born Again	Season 1: Michael Cuesta, Jeffrey Nachmanoff, David Boyd, Justin Benson and Aaron Moorhead; Season 2: Justin Benson and Aaron Moorhead, Solvan "Slick" Naim, Angela Barnes, Iain B. MacDonald	Disney+/Marvel Television	
2025	Fear Street: Prom Queen	Matt Palmer	Netflix/Chernin Entertainment	
2025	Five Nights at Freddy's 2	Emma Tammi	Universal Pictures/Blumhouse	
2026	Carrie	Mike Flanagan	Amazon Prime Video	Thirteenth collaboration with Flanagan
2027	The Exorcist: Martyrs	Mike Flanagan	Universal Pictures/Blumhouse Productions/Atomic Monster/Morgan Creek Entertainment	Fourteenth collaboration with Flanagan

== Awards and nominations ==
- 2016: BloodGuts UK Horror Awards, Nominated Best Soundtrack/Score for Ouija: Origin of Evil (2016)
- 2015: Fangoria Chainsaw Awards, 2nd place Best Score for Oculus (2013)
