= Muzzle: City of Wolves =

- Theatrical release poster
- Directed by: John Stalberg Jr.
- Screenplay by: Jacob Michael King
- Story by: Jacob Michael King; John Stalberg Jr.
- Produced by: Kyle Ambrose; Delon Bakker; David Frigerio; John Stalberg Jr.
- Starring: Aaron Eckhart; Tanya van Graan; Karl Thaning; Nicole Fortuin; Adrian Collins; Hakeem Kae-Kazim
- Cinematography: Pieter Vermeer
- Edited by: Bella Erikson
- Music by: Paul Gallister
- Production companies: Slow Burn; Broken Open Pictures; Bonfire Legend; Highland Film Group
- Distributed by: RLJE Films
- Release date: November 14, 2025
- Running time: 93 minutes
- Country: United States
- Language: English
- Box office: $137,764

Muzzle: City of Wolves is a 2025 American action thriller film produced and directed by John Stalberg Jr. and written by Jacob Michael King. It serves as a sequel to Muzzle. Aaron Eckhart reprises his role from the first film.

The film was released in the United States on November 14, 2025.

== Cast ==
- Aaron Eckhart as Jake Rosser
- Tanya van Graan as Mia Rosser
- Karl Thaning as Officer Beekman
- Nicole Fortuin as Detective Idalia Cutler
- Adrian Collins as Officer Cobb
- Hakeem Kae-Kazim as Detective Thorne

== Production ==
Aaron Eckhart returned to cast from the first film. The film was produced by John Stalberg Jr. through his Slow Burn production company, David Frigerio under Broken Open Pictures, and Highland Film Group. The film is executive produced by Tim O’Hair and RuthAnne Frigerio for Broken Open Pictures, Carlyle Eubank and David Guglielmo for Slow Burn and Dallas Sonnier for Bonfire Legend.

Principal photography began in September 2024 in Cape Town.

== Release ==
=== Distribution ===
Highland has signed deals to the film for Vertigo Releasing for the United Kingdom, Australia, and New Zealand, Capelight Pictures for Germany, YouPlanet Pictures for Spain, Italian International Film for Italy, Three Lines Pictures for Benelux, NOS Lusomundo for Portugal, Spentzos Film for Greece, Mis. Label for Scandinavia, Daro Film Distribution for Eastern Europe, Falcon Films for Middle East, MovieBox for Turkey, Superfine Films for India, California Filmes for Latin America, and Filmfinity for South Africa.

=== Theatrical ===
The film was released in the United States on November 14, 2025, by RLJE Films.
