= Aaron Eckhart =

American actor (born 1968)

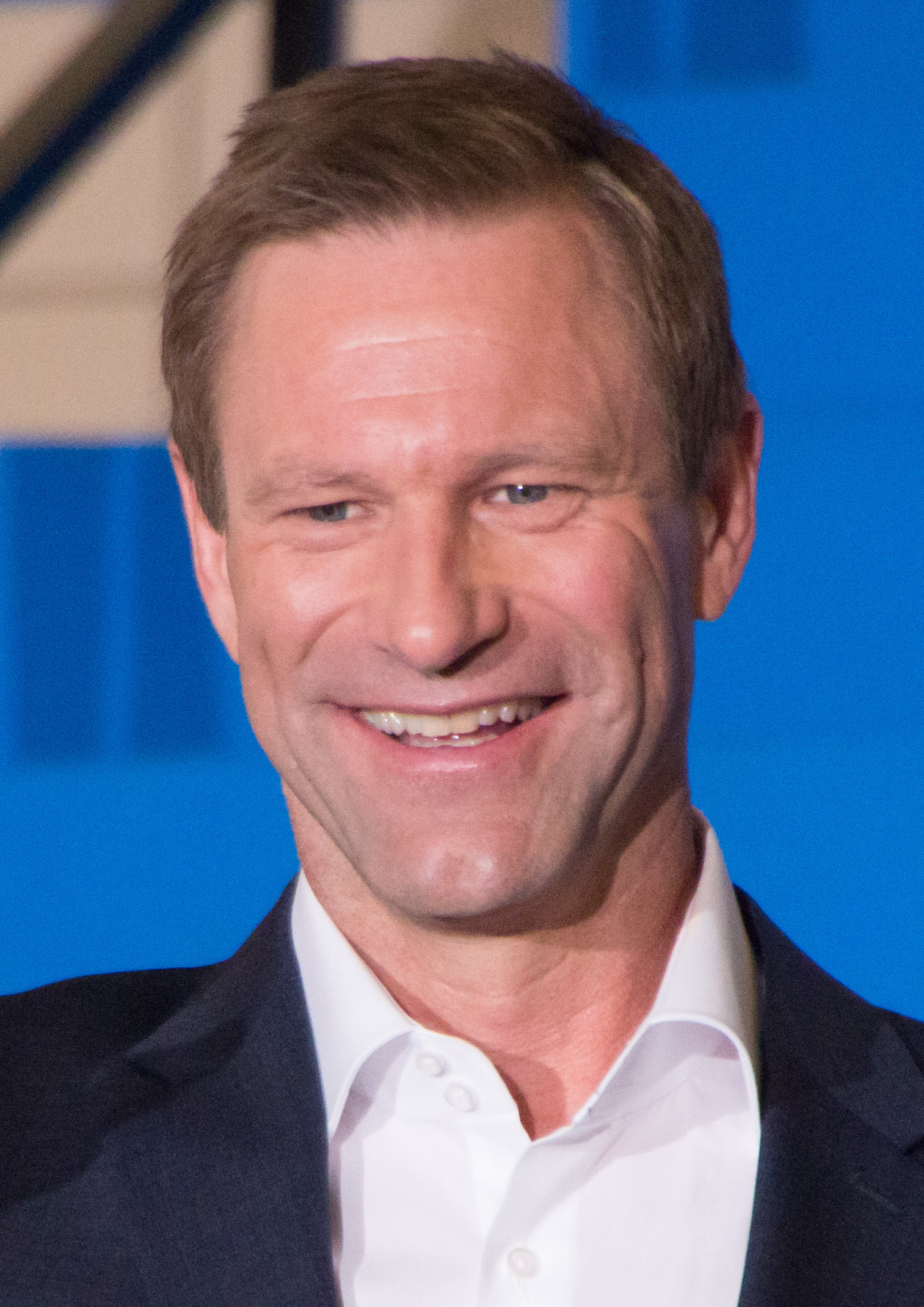
- Eckhart in 2016
- Born: Aaron Edward Eckhart; March 12, 1968 (age 58); Cupertino, California, U.S.
- Education: Brigham Young University (BFA)
- Occupation: Actor
- Years active: 1992–present

Aaron Edward Eckhart (born March 12, 1968) is an American actor.

Born in Cupertino, California, Eckhart moved to the United Kingdom at an early age. He began his acting career by performing in school plays, before moving to Australia for his high school senior year. He left high school without graduating, but earned a diploma through a professional education course, and then graduated from Brigham Young University (BYU) in Provo, Utah, in 1994 with a Bachelor of Fine Arts degree in film.

As an undergraduate at BYU, Eckhart met director and writer Neil LaBute, who cast Eckhart in several of LaBute's original plays. Five years later Eckhart made a debut as an unctuous, sociopathic womanizer in LaBute's black comedy film In the Company of Men (1997), followed by appearances in three more of the director's films.

Eckhart gained wide recognition as George in Erin Brockovich (2000), and, in 2006, he received a Golden Globe nomination for his portrayal of Nick Naylor in Thank You for Smoking. In 2008, he played a major role in Christopher Nolan's blockbuster Batman film The Dark Knight as District Attorney Harvey Dent / Two-Face.

He went on to appear in Love Happens, Rabbit Hole, Battle: Los Angeles, The Rum Diary, Olympus Has Fallen, I, Frankenstein, Sully, and Midway.

== Early life and education ==
Eckhart was born on March 12, 1968 in Cupertino, California, the son of Mary Martha Lawrence, a writer, painter and poet, and James Conrad Eckhart, a computer executive. He is the youngest of three brothers. His father is of Volga German descent, while his mother has English, German, Scots-Irish, and Scottish ancestry. He was raised as a member of the Church of Jesus Christ of Latter-day Saints, and served a two-year mission in France and Switzerland. Eckhart's family relocated to the United Kingdom in 1981, following his father's job in information technology. During their time in the United Kingdom, the family moved around Surrey, England, living in towns such as Cobham, Ripley, and Walton-on-Thames. Eckhart attended American Community School, where he was first introduced to acting, starring in a school production as Charlie Brown.

In 1985, Eckhart moved to Australia and settled in Sydney, where he attended American International School of Sydney for his high school senior year; he further developed his acting skills in productions like Waiting for Godot, where he admits that he gave a "terrible" performance. In the autumn of his senior year, Eckhart left school to take a job at the Warringah Mall movie theater. He eventually earned his diploma through a professional education course. This also allowed Eckhart time to enjoy a year of surfing in Hawaii and France, as well as skiing in the Alps. In 1988, Eckhart returned to the United States and enrolled as a film major at Brigham Young University–Hawaii, but later transferred to Brigham Young University (BYU) in Provo, Utah. He graduated in 1994 with a Bachelor of Fine Arts degree. He also studied acting at the William Esper Studio.

== Career ==
=== Early work ===
While at Brigham Young University, Eckhart appeared in the Mormon-themed film Godly Sorrow, and the role marked his professional debut. At this time he met director/writer Neil LaBute, who cast Eckhart in several of LaBute's original plays. After graduating from BYU, Eckhart moved to New York City, acquired an agent, and took various occasional jobs, including bartending, bus driving, and construction work. His first television roles were in commercials. In 1994, he appeared as an extra on the television drama series Beverly Hills, 90210. Eckhart followed this small part with roles in documentary re-enactments (Ancient Secrets of the Bible: Samson), made-for-television movies, and short-lived programs like Aliens in the Family.

In 1997, Eckhart was approached by Neil LaBute to star in a film adaptation of LaBute's stage play In the Company of Men. He played a frustrated white-collar worker who planned to woo a deaf office worker, gain her affections, then suddenly dump her. The film, his first feature to reach theaters, was critically well received, with Desson Howe of The Washington Post reporting that Eckhart is the "movie's most malignant presence" and that he "is in chilling command as a sort of satanic prince in shirtsleeves". In the Company of Men was a critical success, winning Best First Film for LaBute at the 63rd annual New York Film Critics Circle Awards. His performance won him the Independent Spirit Award in the category of Best Debut Performance. The film was ranked as one of "The 25 Most Dangerous Movies" by Premiere magazine.

The following year Eckhart starred in another LaBute feature, Your Friends & Neighbors (1998), as Barry, a sexually frustrated husband in a dysfunctional marriage. For the role Eckhart was required to gain weight. In 1999, he starred opposite Elisabeth Shue in Molly, a romantic comedy-drama in which he played the self-absorbed brother of an autistic woman who was cured by surgery. Eckhart also starred that year as a football coach, an offensive coordinator in Oliver Stone's Any Given Sunday.

=== Critical success ===
Eckhart first gained wide exposure in 2000 as George, a ponytailed, goateed biker, in Steven Soderbergh's drama Erin Brockovich. The film was met with good reviews, and was a box office success, earning $256 million worldwide. His performance was well received by critics; Entertainment Weekly's Owen Gleiberman wrote that Eckhart "may be playing a bit of an ideal [...] but he makes goodness as palpable as he did yuppie evil in 'In the Company of Men'." In an August 2004 interview, Eckhart claimed that he had not worked for nearly a year before he was cast in the movie. "I felt like I sort of was getting away from what I wanted to do as an actor. [...] I had nine months off, but it wasn't a vacation. Sure, I didn't earn any money for nine months, but every day I was reading scripts, I was producing my own material, I was taking meetings, I was working on my craft."

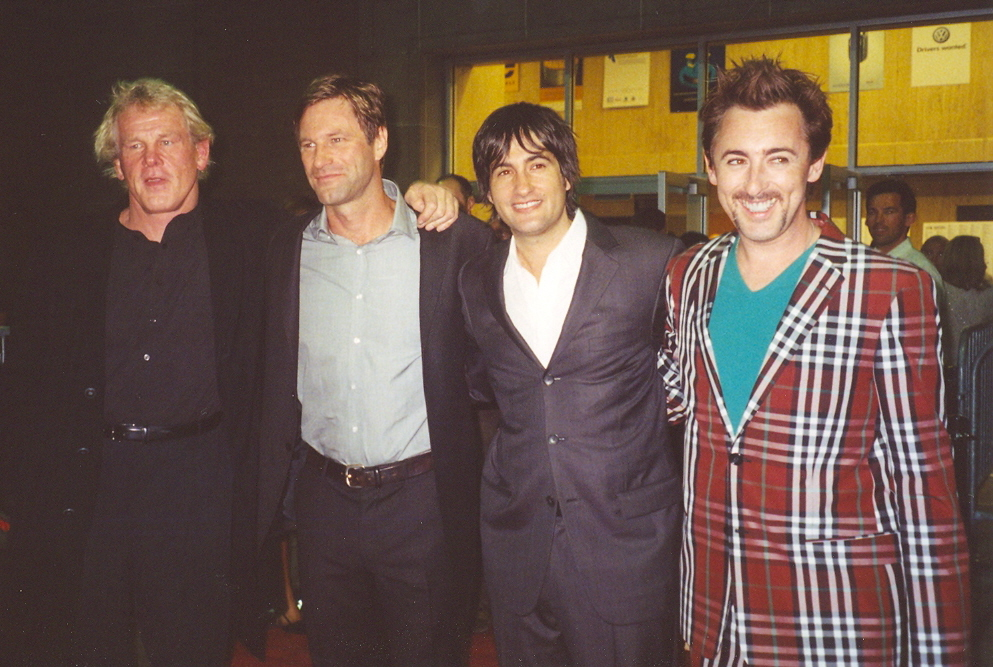
Nick Nolte, Eckhart, Joshua Michael Stern, and Alan Cumming promoting Neverwas at the 2005 Toronto International Film Festival.

Following the release of Erin Brockovich, Eckhart co-starred with Renée Zellweger in LaBute's Nurse Betty (2000). He next appeared in Sean Penn's mystery feature The Pledge (2001), in which he played a young detective partnered with a veteran detective, played by Jack Nicholson. The movie received generally favorable reviews, but it did not fare particularly well at the box office. The following year, he collaborated with LaBute in a film adaptation of the Man Booker Prize-winning novel Possession (2002). In 2003, Eckhart co-starred with Hilary Swank in The Core, a film about a geophysicist who tries to detonate a nuclear device in order to save the world from destruction. The film was critically and financially unsuccessful. Also in 2003, he appeared in The Missing, in which he played Cate Blanchett's lover, and in the action-thriller Paycheck opposite Ben Affleck. Paycheck, based on a short story by science fiction writer Philip K. Dick, garnered generally negative reception. Film critic Roger Ebert of the Chicago Sun-Times gave the film two stars (out of four), saying that he "enjoyed the movie" but felt that it "exploits [Dick's story] for its action and plot potential, but never really develops it."

The following year, away from film, Eckhart guest starred in two episodes of NBC's comedy sitcom Frasier, where he played a boyfriend of Charlotte, Dr. Frasier Crane's love interest. His next film role was in E. Elias Merhige's thriller Suspect Zero, a movie about an FBI agent who tracks down a killer who murders serial killers. Upon release, the movie received broadly negative reviews. Despite the reception, Eckhart's performance was favored by critics; Newsday wrote that Eckhart was a "classically handsome leading man ... but Merhige demands of him complexity and anguish." Suspect Zero was a box office disappointment, earning $11 million worldwide. Also in 2004, Eckhart starred on the London stage, opposite Julia Stiles, in David Mamet's Oleanna at the Garrick Theatre. The drama ran until mid-2004. For this performance, Eckhart received favorable critical reviews. In 2005, returning to film, Eckhart appeared in Neverwas as a therapist who takes a job at a rundown mental hospital that once treated his father (Nick Nolte). The feature was never given a full theatrical release, eventually being released straight to DVD in 2007.

=== Worldwide recognition ===
Eckhart's next project was Thank You for Smoking, in which he played Nick Naylor, a tobacco lobbyist whose firm researched the link between smoking cigarettes and lung cancer. Eckhart said that he felt challenged playing the role: "You have to say these words that are crazy, and yet do it with a smile on your face and have the audience like you. At one point, I'm doing a talk show with a kid who's dying of cancer, and he's going through chemotherapy and the whole thing, and I spin it so the anti-smoking people are the bad guys and I'm the good guy, and I'm this guy's best friend. I mean, it's whacked out." The film was screened at a special presentation at the 30th annual Toronto International Film Festival in 2005. It had a limited release in March 2006 and was released worldwide the following month. For his performance, Eckhart received a Golden Globe nomination for Best Actor in a Motion Picture Musical or Comedy. A contributor of USA Today wrote that he gave a "standout, whip-smart performance" citing that as Nick Naylor he kept him "likable even in his cynicism." In the Seattle Post-Intelligencer review of the film, it was reported that "Under his chummy but compassionless smile" Eckhart radiated charm and "Naylor's true joys: manipulating arguments, steering debate, cooking words."

In this same year, he starred with Helena Bonham Carter in Conversations with Other Women (2006). While promoting this film, Eckhart revealed that he wishes not to be typecast or repeat himself, saying he does not want to play any more villains. He appeared in the 2006 film noir The Black Dahlia—based on a real 1947 crime—as Sergeant Leland "Lee" Blanchard, a detective investigating the murder of Elizabeth Short, later dubbed the "Black Dahlia". The film premiered at the 63rd Venice International Film Festival. Reception for the movie was mixed, but many critics enjoyed Eckhart's performance; Time Out magazine praised Eckhart and co-star Hilary Swank for their performances, writing "...both [are] great in their secondary roles."

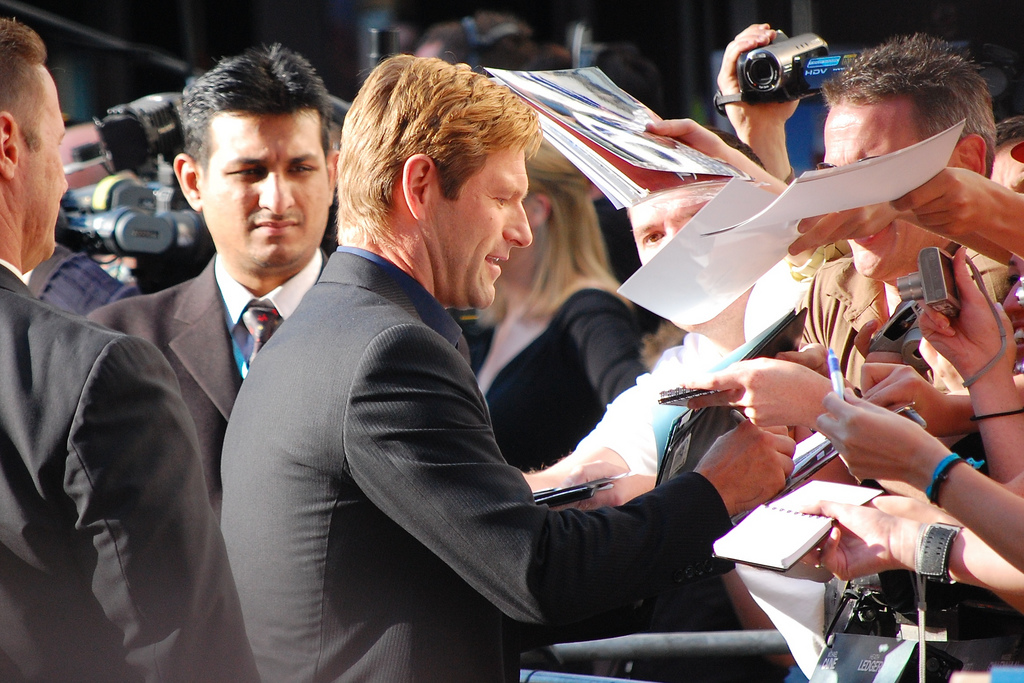
Eckhart signing autographs for fans during promotion of The Dark Knight in 2008.

Internationally viewed as a sex symbol, he was named one of People magazine's 100 Most Beautiful People in 2006. The following year, Eckhart was invited to join the Academy of Motion Picture Arts and Sciences. He starred in No Reservations (2007), a remake of the 2001 German romantic comedy Mostly Martha. He starred opposite Catherine Zeta-Jones as an up-and-coming hotshot chef. The film was met with mixed reviews and was unfavorably compared to the original film. Eckhart starred in the 2008 comedy Meet Bill, in which he played the eponymous character, a sad executive working at his father-in-law's bank. He gained 30 pounds and donned a fat suit for the role.

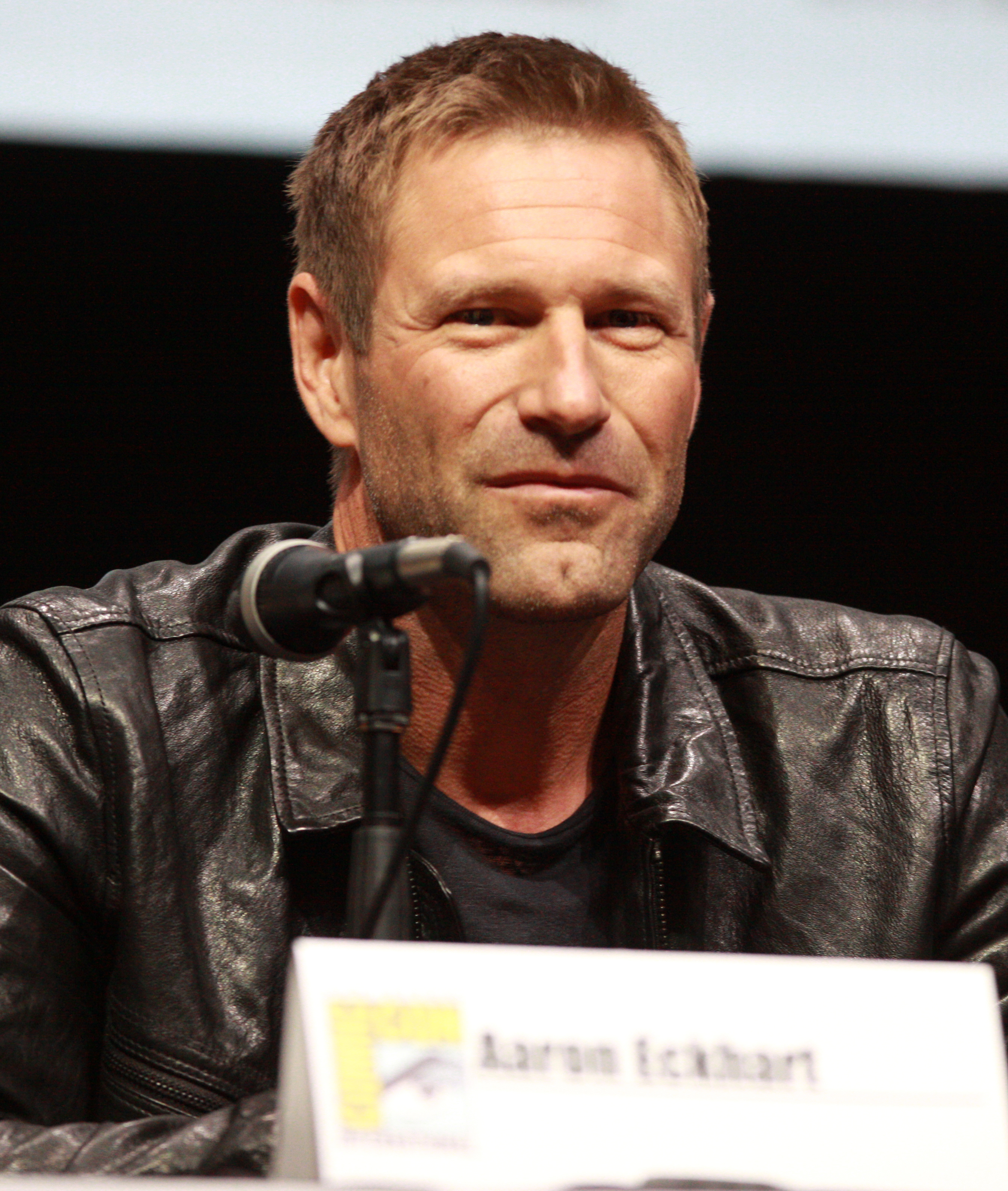
Eckhart at San Diego Comic-Con in July 2013

Also in 2008, Eckhart portrayed the comic book character Harvey Dent in Christopher Nolan's The Dark Knight, the sequel to the 2005 film Batman Begins. Nolan's decision to cast Eckhart was based on his portrayal of corrupt characters in the films In the Company of Men, The Black Dahlia, and Thank You For Smoking. He noted in his depiction of the character that "[he] is still true to himself. He's a crime fighter, he's not killing good people. He's not a bad guy, not purely", while admitting "I'm interested in good guys gone wrong." The Dark Knight was a big financial and critical success, setting a new opening weekend box office record for North America. With revenue of $1 billion worldwide, it became the fourth highest-grossing film of all time, and the highest-grossing film of Eckhart's career. Roger Ebert opined that Eckhart did an "especially good job" as his character in the feature, while Premiere magazine also enjoyed his performance, noting that he "makes you believe in his ill-fated ambition ... of morphing into the conniving Two-Face."

Following the success of The Dark Knight, Eckhart next appeared in Alan Ball's Towelhead (2008), an adaptation of the Alicia Erian novel of the same name, in which he played a Gulf War Army reservist who sexually abuses his 13-year-old Arab-American neighbor. The film was screened under the name Nothing is Private at the 2007 Toronto International Film Festival. When asked about the sex scenes, Eckhart said: "Those were difficult times .... The way I did it was to really trust Alan. It was in the words. I really trusted Summer [Bishil], and I tried to get her to trust me, to build a relationship when we were doing physical scenes. We'd really rehearse them mechanically, and I'd say, 'OK, I'm going to put my hand here, I'm going to do this.' ... I think I found it more difficult." Towelhead was critically and financially unsuccessful.

He next co-starred with Jennifer Aniston in the romantic drama Love Happens, released in September 2009, as a motivational speaker coming to terms with his own grief. The movie received ambivalent reviews, with a contributor of the Orlando Sentinel reporting that Eckhart plays "broken" for the whole movie. The following year he starred alongside Nicole Kidman in Rabbit Hole (2010), an adaption of David Lindsay-Abaire's 2005 drama of the same name. The feature premiered at the 2010 Toronto International Film Festival. In 2011, Eckhart starred in Jonathan Liebesman's science fiction film Battle: Los Angeles, in which he portrayed a combat veteran Marine platoon sergeant. The film was set in modern-day Los Angeles during a global alien invasion, and followed a platoon of U.S. Marines who are joined by an Air Force special operations sergeant and some Army infantry soldiers in combat operations against the alien enemy. He appeared alongside Johnny Depp, Richard Jenkins, and Amber Heard in Hunter S. Thompson's novel adaptation The Rum Diary, directed by Bruce Robinson. In the film, Eckhart played Sanderson, a wealthy landowner, who believes everything has a price and introduces Paul Kemp (Depp) to a different standard of living. He starred as a U.S. President who is taken hostage, in the 2013 action thriller Olympus Has Fallen, opposite Gerard Butler, and reprised the role in its 2016 sequel London Has Fallen.

In 2019, he starred in Roland Emmerich’s blockbuster movie Midway, which also starred Ed Skrein, Patrick Wilson, Dennis Quaid and Woody Harrelson.

== Personal life ==
Eckhart met actress Emily Cline during the filming of In the Company of Men and they became engaged, but they separated in 1998. He has always been reluctant to speak about his relationships in interviews. Eckhart dated songwriter and member of SHeDAISY Kristyn Osborn from 2006 to 2007. He appeared in the group's video for their song "I'm Taking the Wheel".

Eckhart has noted that hypnosis helped him to quit drinking, smoking, and partying, and that he undertakes amateur photography in his spare time.

== Filmography ==
Key
†	Denotes films that have not yet been released

=== Film ===
Year	Title	Role	Director	Notes
1992	Godly Sorrow			
1993	Hot Shots! Part Deux	Prisoner	Jim Abrahams	Uncredited
1993	Slaughter of the Innocents	Ken Reynolds	James Glickenhaus	
1997	In the Company of Men	Chad	Neil LaBute	
1998	Your Friends & Neighbors	Barry	Neil LaBute	
1998	Thursday	Nick	Skip Woods	
1999	Molly	Buck McKay	John Duigan	
1999	Any Given Sunday	Nick Crozier	Oliver Stone	
2000	Erin Brockovich	George	Steven Soderbergh	
2000	Nurse Betty	Del Sizemore	Neil LaBute	
2000	Tumble	"Man"	Neil LaBute	
2001	The Pledge	Stan Krolak	Sean Penn	
2002	Possession	Roland Michell	Neil LaBute	
2003	The Core	Dr. Joshua "Josh" Keyes	Jon Amiel	
2003	The Missing	Brake Baldwin	Ron Howard	
2003	Paycheck	James Rethrick	John Woo	
2004	Suspect Zero	Thomas Mackelway	E. Elias Merhige	
2005	Neverwas	Zach Riley	Joshua Michael Stern	Also co-producer
2005	Thank You for Smoking	Nick Naylor	Jason Reitman	
2005	Conversations with Other Women	Man	Hans Canosa	
2006	The Wicker Man	Truck Stop Patron	Neil LaBute	
2006	The Black Dahlia	Sgt. Lee Blanchard	Brian De Palma	
2007	No Reservations	Nick Palmer	Scott Hicks	
2007	Towelhead	Mr. Vuoso	Alan Ball	Also known as Nothing is Private
2007	Meet Bill	Bill Anderson	Bernie Goldmann & Melisa Wallack	Also executive producer
2008	The Dark Knight	Harvey Dent / Two-Face	Christopher Nolan	
2009	Love Happens	Dr. Burke Ryan	Brandon Camp	
2010	Rabbit Hole	Howie Corbett	John Cameron Mitchell	
2010	To Be Friends	—N/a	James Lawrence Eckhart	Producer
2011	Battle: Los Angeles	SSGT Michael Nantz	Jonathan Liebesman	
2011	The Rum Diary	Hal Sanderson	Bruce Robinson	
2012	Erased	Ben Logan	Philipp Stölzl	Also known as The Expatriate
2013	Olympus Has Fallen	President Benjamin Asher	Antoine Fuqua	
2014	I, Frankenstein	The Monster / Adam Frankenstein	Stuart Beattie	
2015	My All American	Darrell Royal	Angelo Pizzo	
2016	London Has Fallen	President Benjamin Asher	Babak Najafi	
2016	Sully	First Officer Jeffrey Skiles	Clint Eastwood	
2016	Bleed for This	Kevin Rooney	Ben Younger	
2016	Incarnate	Dr. Seth Ember	Brad Peyton	
2019	Midway	Lieutenant Colonel Jimmy Doolittle	Roland Emmerich	
2019	Line of Duty	Frank Penny	Steven C. Miller	Also known as Live!
2020	Wander	Arthur Bretnik	April Mullen	
2023	Ambush	Drummond	Mark Earl Burman	
2023	Muzzle	Jake Rosser	John Stalberg Jr.	
2023	Rumble Through the Dark	Jack Boucher	Graham Phillips & Parker Phillips	
2023	The Bricklayer	Steve Vail	Renny Harlin	
2024	Chief of Station	Ben Malloy	Jesse V. Johnson	
2024	Classified	Evan Shaw	Roel Reiné	
2025	Muzzle: City of Wolves	Jake Rosser	John Stalberg Jr.	
2026	Deep Water	Ben	Renny Harlin	
2026	Model Citizen	Steven Bay	Tag Mendillo	

=== Television ===
Year	Title	Role	Note(s)
1992	Double Jeopardy	Dwayne	Television film
1993	History's Greatest Miracles	Samson	Television special
1994	Beverly Hills, 90210	Extra	Uncredited
1996	Aliens in the Family	Townsend	Episode: "Meet the Brodys"
2004	Frasier	Frank	2 episodes
2018	The Romanoffs	Gregory	Episode: "The Violet Hour"
2022	The First Lady	President Gerald Ford	Main role
2022	Pantheon	Cary Duval	Voice role

== Awards and nominations ==
- Independent Spirit Award for Best Debut Performance
- Satellite Award for Outstanding New Talent
- Nominated – Golden Globe Award for Best Actor – Motion Picture Musical or Comedy
- Nominated – Independent Spirit Award for Best Male Lead
- Nominated – St. Louis Gateway Film Critics Association Award for Best Actor
- Nominated – Independent Spirit Award for Best Male Lead
- Nominated – San Diego Film Critics Society Award for Best Actor
- Central Ohio Film Critics Association Award for Best Acting Ensemble
- People's Choice Award for Favorite Cast
- Nominated – Broadcast Film Critics Association Award for Best Cast
- Nominated – Saturn Award for Best Supporting Actor
- Nominated – Scream Award for Best Villain

== Sources ==
- Mitchell, Peter (May 1, 2003). "Dundee a talisman for Eckhart". The Age.
- Head, Steve. "IGN interviews Aaron Eckhart." IGN. August 24, 2004. Accessed December 30, 2008.
- Roberts, Farin. "BBC Movies – Aaron Eckhart interview." BBC Films. June 16, 2006. Accessed December 30, 2008. (Farin Roberts interviews Aaron Eckhart in discussion of Thank You for Smoking.) [Includes video clip].
- Fischer, Paul. "Aaron Eckhart No Reservations Interview." Femail. Accessed December 30, 2008.
- Berkshire, Geoff. "'Dark Knight' Q&A: Aaron Eckhart." Chicago Metromix. July 14, 2008. Accessed December 15, 2008.
- Blades, Nicole. "Aaron Eckhart Interview." Women's Health. July 16, 2008. Accessed October 24, 2008.
- Mottram, James. "Aaron Eckhart interview." Marie Claire. July 28, 2008. Accessed December 30, 2008.
- Fischer, Paul. "Aaron Eckhart The Dark Knight Interview." Femail. Accessed December 30, 2008.
- Berk, Phillip. "Man of the Hour." Filmink. September 16, 2008. Accessed October 3, 2008.
