= Spanking Shakespeare =

2007 novel by Jake Wizner

- Author: Jake Wizner
- Language: English
- Genre: Young adult novel
- Publisher: Random House
- Publication date: 2007
- Publication place: United States
- Media type: Print Hardcover
- Pages: 287pp
- ISBN: 978-0-375-84085-2

Spanking Shakespeare (2007) is the debut novel by Jake Wizner. It is a young adult novel that tells the story of the unfortunately named Shakespeare Shapiro and his struggles in high school, dating and friendship. Large portions of the novel are presented as Shakespeare’s high school memoir for his English class with the rest of the work being told in a traditional first person narrative.

== Characters ==
The book has around six central characters, although several others play roles in the novel:

- Shakespeare Shapiro — a high school boy who sees himself as a victim his entire life starting with his parents’ choice of his unusual name right up to every awkward event in high school. Like his namesake, Shakespeare is a talented, if somewhat profane, writer. He sees himself as ranking very low in the social ladder of high school. Shakespeare appears as a minor character in Wizner's second novel, Castration Celebration.
- Neil Wasserman — Shakespeare’s best friend who is obsessed with his own bowel movements. He and Katie hook up during the book, much to Shakespeare's annoyance.
- Katie Marks — Shakespeare’s only other friend, who is verbally abusive to both him and Neil and wears a military coat. She has a drinking problem but cleans up by the novel's conclusion.
- Gandhi Shapiro — Shakespeare’s younger, handsomer brother who is as successful with girls as Shakespeare is a failure. Is also a sharp businessman and extremely popular. He is revealed partway in the book to have been using marijuana since his freshman year.
- Celeste Keller — an intelligent classmate who briefly dates Shakespeare because of his witty writing in an attempt to forget about her boyfriend who is away at college. She attempts to remain friends with him, but he generally avoids her after their relationship ends.
- Charlotte White — a frequently absent classmate who is dealing with a variety of family issues. Shakespeare befriends her and finds himself unexpectedly attracted to her, ultimately asking her to the prom near the end of the book.

== Critical reaction ==
Kirkus found it funny, but the jokes sometimes slowed down the plot. Publishers Weekly called it "bold and bawdy", "exceptionally funny and smart". Michael Sullivan praised it for "great laughs". It was also reviewed by Booklist.

== Jake Wizner ==
The author is a middle-school English teacher, his father a law professor and his mother a university dean, both at Yale. He attended Wesleyan University where he was in a class with novelist Daniel Handler.

== Film adaptation ==
Paramount Pictures has purchased the film rights to the novel. There was a projected release of 2013. As of 2016, there's been no word on the status of the film .

John Stalberg, Jr. is attached to direct and rewrite the screenplay adaptation, originally written by Dan Lagana.
