= Crypto (film) =

2019 crime thriller drama film

- Theatrical release poster
- Directed by: John Stalberg Jr.
- Screenplay by: Carlyle Eubank; David Frigerio
- Story by: Jeffrey Ingber
- Produced by: Jordan Yale Levine; Jordan Beckerman; David Frigerio
- Starring: Beau Knapp; Alexis Bledel; Luke Hemsworth; Kurt Russell
- Cinematography: Pieter Vermeer
- Edited by: Brian Berdan
- Music by: Nima Fakhrara
- Production companies: Grindstone Entertainment Group; YP; Film Mode Entertainment; Dynasty Pictures
- Distributed by: Lionsgate
- Release date: April 12, 2019 (United States)
- Running time: 106 minutes
- Country: United States
- Language: English
- Box office: $20,440

Crypto is a 2019 American crime drama thriller film about money laundering and cryptocurrency.

The film was directed by John Stalberg Jr., and written by Carlyle Eubank, David Frigerio and Jeffrey Ingber. It stars Beau Knapp, Alexis Bledel, Luke Hemsworth and Kurt Russell. The film was released on April 12, 2019 in the United States by Lionsgate.

== Plot ==
Martin "Marty" Duran is an anti money laundering (AML) analyst at Omnicorp Bank headquarters in Manhattan. He produces a report showing that a potential client, a $7 billion corporation, has violated AML rules, killing the deal. The CEO wants him fired, but the head of AML, Robin, believes in him and saves him – though he is demoted to a branch in his tiny hometown of Elba, in upstate New York.

He reunites with a childhood friend, Earl, who owns a failing liquor store, but is a computer genius who stays above water by mining cryptocurrency. He has a much less successful reunion with his brother, Caleb, and father, Martin Sr., who work a failing potato farm that is going to be repossessed by Martin’s bank.

Marty meets Katie, who works at an art gallery, her boss Penelope, and their accountant, Ted.

Marty's AML review of the bank’s records lead him to investigate the gallery. Earl helps him by hacking various computer banks. Together, they uncover a multi-million dollar money laundering scheme, helping a deadly Russian mafia group.

Earl, Penelope and Marty’s predecessor at the branch are killed by Viktor and Nikos, Ted's thugs. Earl had couriered Marty a memory stick with evidence that Robin is facilitating the entire money laundering scheme at Omnicorp. Ted and his thugs hold Martin Sr. hostage to get the evidence, but Marty and Caleb spring a trap on them, supported by Katie and her FBI colleagues, as Marty deduced who she was.

Robin is arrested and Marty starts cryptocurrency mining at the farm, saving their finances, while starting to date Katie.

== Cast ==
- Beau Knapp as Martin Duran, Jr.
- Alexis Bledel as Katie
- Luke Hemsworth as Caleb Duran
- Jeremie Harris as Earl Simmons
- Jill Hennessy as Robin Whiting
- Malaya Rivera Drew as Penelope Rushing
- Vincent Kartheiser as Ted Patterson
- Kurt Russell as Martin Duran, Sr.
- Joseph Siprut as Viktor
- Ron Menzel as Nikos
- Enrico Rubboli as Investor
- Joseph Mickey Jr. as Joe Mickey
- Seán Cullen as Bernard
- Paul Johansson as Brian

== Production ==
Principal photography began on June 15, 2018 in New York City with multiple scenes shot in Ulster County, New York. John Stalberg Jr. directed the film from the original story by Jeffrey Ingber and the screenplay by Carlyle Eubank and David Frigerio, while producers would be Yale Productions' Jordan Yale Levine and Jordan Beckerman along with Frigerio.

== Reception ==
Critical reception was largely negative at 17%, with Rotten Tomatoes ranking the film as "rotten" with 5 negative reviews and one positive. Richard Roeper of The Chicago Sun-Times gave the film 3 stars out of 4, stating that Crypto had enough surprising and "offbeat" moments for a marginal recommendation as a "wonderfully convoluted guilty-pleasure". In contrast, Noel Murray of the Los Angeles Times wrote: "The characters all feel like they’ve been copied and pasted from hundreds of other movies".
