= Mitchell Amundsen =

American cinematographer (born 1958)

- Born: Charles Mitchell Amundsen; May 31, 1958 (age 68); San Francisco, California
- Occupation: cinematographer
- Years active: 1981–present

Charles Mitchell Amundsen (born May 31, 1958) is an American cinematographer.

== Filmography ==
Film

| Year | Title | Director | Notes |
|---|---|---|---|
| 2002 | The Country Bears | Peter Hastings | |
| 2005 | Transporter 2 | Louis Leterrier | |
| 2007 | Transformers | Michael Bay | |
| 2008 | Wanted | Timur Bekmambetov | |
| 2009 | G.I. Joe: The Rise of Cobra | Stephen Sommers | |
| 2010 | High School | John Stalberg Jr. | |
| 2010 | Jonah Hex | Jimmy Hayward | |
| 2012 | Premium Rush | David Koepp | |
| 2012 | Red Dawn | Dan Bradley | |
| 2013 | Odd Thomas | Stephen Sommers | |
| 2013 | Now You See Me | Louis Leterrier | With Larry Fong |
| 2014 | Closed Set | Himself | Short film |
| 2016 | Ride Along 2 | Tim Story | |
| 2017 | CHiPs | Dax Shepard | |
| 2017 | A Bad Moms Christmas | Scott Moore; Jon Lucas | |
| 2018 | The Happytime Murders | Brian Henson | |
| 2021 | Home Sweet Home Alone | Dan Mazer | |
| 2022 | Cheaper by the Dozen | Gail Lerner | |
| 2023 | Renfield | Chris McKay | |
| 2024 | The Underdoggs | Charles Stone III | |

Documentary film

| Year | Title | Director | Notes |
|---|---|---|---|
| 2002 | Ultimate X: The Movie | Bruce Hendricks | With Reed Smoot and Rodney Taylor |
| 2011 | Hot Wheels: Fearless at the 500 | Mike McCoy | TV movie |

Concert film

| Year | Title | Director | Notes |
|---|---|---|---|
| 2008 | Hannah Montana & Miley Cyrus: Best of Both Worlds Concert | Bruce Hendricks | With Reed Smoot and Rodney Taylor |
| 2009 | Jonas Brothers: The 3D Concert Experience | Bruce Hendricks | With Reed Smoot |
