= Knights of the Zodiac (film) =

2023 film by Tomek Bagiński

- Theatrical release poster
- Directed by: Tomek Bagiński
- Screenplay by: Josh Campbell; Matt Stuecken; Kiel Murray
- Based on: Saint Seiya by Masami Kurumada
- Produced by: Yoshi Ikezawa; Joseph Chou; Tim Kwok
- Starring: Mackenyu; Famke Janssen; Madison Iseman; Diego Tinoco; Mark Dacascos; Nick Stahl; Sean Bean
- Cinematography: Tomasz Naumiuk
- Edited by: Peter Pav; Kenny G. Krauss
- Music by: Yoshihiro Ike
- Production companies: Stage 6 Films; Toei Animation
- Distributed by: Toei Company, Ltd. (Japan); Sony Pictures Releasing (worldwide)
- Release dates: April 28, 2023 (Japan); May 12, 2023 (United States)
- Running time: 112 minutes
- Countries: United States; Japan
- Language: English
- Budget: $32 million
- Box office: $7 million

Knights of the Zodiac, known in Japan as Saint Seiya: The Beginning (Japanese: 聖闘士星矢 The Beginning, Hepburn: Seinto Seiya Za Biginingu), is a 2023 fantasy action film directed by Tomek Bagiński from a screenplay by Josh Campbell, Matt Stuecken, and Kiel Murray, based on the manga Saint Seiya by Masami Kurumada. The film stars Mackenyu, Famke Janssen, Madison Iseman, Diego Tinoco, Mark Dacascos, Nick Stahl, and Sean Bean.

Knights of the Zodiac was released in Japan on April 28, 2023, and in the United States on May 12. The film has received mostly negative reviews from critics and grossed $7 million, becoming a box-office bomb.

== Plot ==
Seiya is a street orphan searching for his sister Patricia, who has been kidnapped. During a fight with Cassios in a fighting ring, Seiya unleashes a strange blue light. After the fight, he meets with Docrates and Alman Kido. Kido warns Seiya that his ex-wife Vander Guraad is looking for him.

Guraad's warriors capture Docrates and pursue Seiya and Kido, who meet up with Mylock, Kido's assistant. Following a brief chase, Seiya, Mylock and Kido escape from the warriors. Seiya demands to know what is happening, but is knocked out by Mylock. Seiya recalls his sister's kidnapping while unconscious, and is later taken to Kido's hideout.

Kido informs Seiya that his adopted daughter Sienna Kido is the reincarnation of the goddess Athena, and Seiya is destined to become the Pegasus Knight, a warrior for Athena. Patricia knew about Seiya's destiny and gave herself up to protect him. Kido tells Seiya that he should train under Marin the Eagle Knight, so that he can use his Cosmo to protect himself and Sienna, and to find Patricia.

While having breakfast with Seiya, Sienna briefly loses control of her Cosmo, but Kido is able to calm her down. Meanwhile, Cassios beats up several of Guraad's powerful prototype soldiers, and accepts an offer from Guraad to become one as well in exchange for exacting revenge on Seiya.

Seiya and Sienna get to know each other, and she convinces him to go to Marin for training. Seiya goes with Mylock to the mountain where Marin resides, and climbs up the mountain alone to meet with her. Seiya's training initially goes poorly, as he is unable to channel his Cosmo properly, but he keeps training with Marin's help. That night, Sienna experiences a vision of herself as Athena destroying Seiya's armor and causing widespread destruction, which causes her to emit another Cosmo burst.

Seiya eventually gains control of his Cosmo. His pendant glows and unlocks his Pegasus Knight Armor, but he experiences a vision while bonding with the armor, revealing that Kido was present when Guraad took Patricia. Seiya returns to Kido's hideout to confront him, but Sienna takes him away from the mansion. She reveals that she destroyed Guraad's arms when she was young, forcing Guraad to drain Cosmo from children with it to stay alive, and that Guraad let Patricia go when she learned that Patricia did not have any Cosmo.

Guraad arrives at Kido's hideout after her subordinate Nero tortures its location out of Docrates. Seiya and Sienna return to the mansion. Seiya fights off Guraad's soldiers, but he fails to activate his Pegasus Knight Armor while fighting Cassios, resulting in him being beaten unconscious. Kido sets his estate to self-destruct in an effort to stop Guraad, and he dies in the explosion. Sienna is knocked unconscious and captured by Guraad's soldiers, and Seiya is unable to stop them.

Guraad admits to Sienna that she has given up on fixing herself, and proceeds to start depleting Sienna's Cosmo to prevent her becoming a threat to the world. Mylock rescues Seiya, who forgives himself for being unable to rescue Patricia when she was taken. Mylock and Seiya travel to Guraad's base, where Seiya unlocks his Pegasus Knight Armor and defeats Guraad's soldiers and Cassios.

Guraad becomes unable to watch Sienna be drained of her energy and tries to stop the procedure, but Nero turns against her and assumes his Phoenix Knight Armor. Nero and Seiya proceed to fight, but are interrupted by Sienna, who has almost completed her transformation into Athena, causing widespread destruction. With Seiya's help, Sienna manages to regain control, but falls unconscious afterwards.

When she wakes up, Sienna's hair has turned long and purple. Sienna and Guraad reconcile, and Sienna restores Guraad's arms. Sienna and Seiya leave the area with Mylock; Nero watches them leave. Sienna reveals that the old gods are returning, and the Knights of the Zodiac will be needed to stop them. She decides that they will need to find Patricia.

== Cast ==
- Mackenyu as Seiya/Pegasus
- Famke Janssen as Guraad
- Madison Iseman as Sienna Kido/Athena
- Diego Tinoco as Nero/Phoenix
- Mark Dacascos as Mylock
- Nick Stahl as Cassios
- Sean Bean as Alman Kido
- T.J. Storm as Docrates
- Caitlin Hutson as Marin/Eagle

== Production ==
Saint Seiya author Masami Kurumada wanted to adapt it to a live-action film almost as long as he worked on the manga, and in 2016, Toei Animation first revealed that such an adaptation was in development at CCXP. Toei later gave the film an official green-light in May 2017 with Tomasz Bagiński directing. It was originally to be a co-production between Toei and Chinese company A Really Good Film Company, who would later drop out. By 2018, Toei hired GFM Films to handle international sales.

The original screenplay was adapted by Josh Campbell and Matt Stuecken, with later additions by Kiel Murray. The main cast was announced in September 2021, including Mackenyu, Madison Iseman, Sean Bean, Diego Tinoco, Famke Janssen, Nick Stahl, and Mark Dacascos with Sony Pictures joining as distributor (outside Japan) and co-financing partner around a day later.

The theme song is "Courage" by Pink, originally from her 2019 album Hurts 2B Human.

Filming took place between July and September 2021 in Hungary and Croatia. Andy Cheng provided the fight and stunt coordination.

== Release ==
Knights of the Zodiac was released theatrically in Latin America on April 27, 2023, in Japan on April 28, and in the United States on May 12.

In North America, the film was released digitally on June 27, 2023, followed by a Blu-ray and DVD release on July 11 via Sony Pictures Home Entertainment.

== Reception ==
On the review aggregator website Rotten Tomatoes, 21% of 24 critics' reviews are positive, with an average rating of 4.4/10. The website's consensus reads: "The animation's well done, but impressive visuals aren't enough to cover for Knights of the Zodiac's threadbare plot." Metacritic, which uses a weighted average, assigned the film a score of 35 out of 100, based on eight critics, indicating "generally unfavorable" reviews.

Carlos Aguilar of the Los Angeles Times wrote, "That Bagiński's Knights of the Zodiac amounts to a well-intended disappointment doesn't mean it has zero merit as a work of entertainment, but it will neither satisfy the fandom's demands for a true-to-the-bone homage to their childhood favorite, nor will it transmit to outsiders why this tale of blind courage in the face of insurmountable odds has inspired such decades-long devotion." Courtney Lanning of the Arkansas Democrat-Gazette said, "The narrative and characters are swallowed by a storm of ill-conceived CGI and unfortunate writing, another title in the long list of live-action anime adaptations that should deter similar future attempts."

IGN's Matt Donato gave the film a score of 4/10, calling it "a smorgasbord of unimpressive digital effects as Baginski struggles to recreate the feel of anime in live action (think Netflix's Cowboy Bebop show), boiling down Kurumada's vivid source material into a bland, loud, voiceless gruel with no substance."

Eric Francisco of Inverse praised the film, saying that it was "secretly brilliant in its holistic understanding of what makes anime appealing as a medium." He added, "Melodramatic characters, impenetrable worldbuilding, and acrobatic choreography are all hallmarks to some of the best anime. Zodiac is faithful to these eccentricities, which most 'real' Hollywood movies overlook in favor of verisimilitude." Common Sense Media's Tara McNamara gave the film 3/5 stars, likening it to a mashup of Clash of the Titans and Flash Gordon and saying, "Like those two movies, Knights of the Zodiac is likely to get groans from jaded adults, but it has that same potential to strike a chord with young viewers taken in by the spectacle and the possibility."
