= Swing Vote (2008 film) =

2008 film by Joshua Michael Stern

- Theatrical release poster
- Directed by: Joshua Michael Stern
- Written by: Joshua Michael Stern; Jason Richman
- Produced by: Kevin Costner; Jim Wilson
- Starring: Kevin Costner; Paula Patton; Kelsey Grammer; Dennis Hopper; Nathan Lane; Stanley Tucci; George Lopez; Madeline Carroll
- Cinematography: Shane Hurlbut
- Edited by: Jeff McEvoy
- Music by: John Debney
- Production companies: Touchstone Pictures; Treehouse Films; 1821 Pictures; Radar Pictures
- Distributed by: Walt Disney Studios Motion Pictures
- Release date: August 1, 2008
- Running time: 120 minutes
- Country: United States
- Language: English
- Budget: $21 million
- Box office: $17.6 million

Swing Vote is a 2008 American political comedy-drama film about an entire U.S. presidential election determined by the vote of one man. It was directed by Joshua Michael Stern, and stars Kevin Costner, Paula Patton, Kelsey Grammer, Dennis Hopper, Nathan Lane, Stanley Tucci, George Lopez and Madeline Carroll. The film was released on August 1, 2008.

== Plot ==
Heavy-drinking slacker Ernest "Bud" Johnson lives in a trailer in Texico, New Mexico. His wife, Larissa, left him and his young daughter, Molly, to pursue an ill-fated singing career. Bud is generally late for work and deems elections to be wastes of time. Unlike Bud, Molly cares about politics and urges him to vote in the presidential election, as she registered him as an independent.

Bud reluctantly promises to vote, but is fired from his job and gets drunk at the bar instead, forgetting his promise to Molly. When he sees Molly being interviewed about the election by television journalist Kate Madison, Bud remembers and attempts to drive to the polling station. However, he passes out drunk in his truck before he can leave the parking lot. Frustrated, Molly decides to secretly vote on his behalf. Before she can select a candidate, the voting machine malfunctions, leaving the ballot inside. Molly takes the stub and leaves to avoid getting caught, driving Bud home. She tells Bud that she wants to live with Larissa, to no avail.

However, the election cannot be called for either candidate: the incumbent Republican, Andrew Carington Boone, and the opposing Democrat, Donald Greenleaf. The election is too close to call, with the candidates in a tie in both the popular votes and electoral votes. The election is down to whoever wins New Mexico's five electoral votes, but the election there cannot be called for either candidate because Bud's vote was not properly cast. Due to the critical nature of the election and because the state's votes were already recounted, Bud is given no more than ten days to vote for either candidate, breaking the tie in the state's popular vote.

Greenleaf's campaign manager, Art Crumb, orders his team to learn everything they can about Bud's interests, hoping to win him over to vote for Greenleaf. Boone's campaign manager, Martin Fox does the same and sends his friend Richard Petty to drive Bud and Molly to Air Force One for a personal meeting with President Boone. Returning home from that meeting, Bud sees an ad from a friend of Greenleaf, Willie Nelson, a celebrity Bud admires. The ad personally invites Bud to a party thrown by Crumb and Greenleaf, designed specifically around Bud's interests. Greenleaf's campaign even arranged for one of Bud's old bandmates to be paroled so they could do another musical performance. Molly is sickened by the posturing on both sides.

Kate is urged by her boss John Sweeney to get an exclusive interview with Bud. As a result of this interview, Bud's actual opinions (or lack thereof) are misinterpreted by the media, causing the candidates to flip-flop on several positions. Greenleaf ignoring his principles to win results in his wife leaving him, to which Crumb is unsympathetic. Both continue to pander to Bud, but gradually move away from the cynical tactics forced on them by their advisers. Boone ignores Fox's plan to offer Bud a lobbying job as a bribe, and Greenleaf reconciles with his wife.

However, Bud only alienates Molly further by forgetting about "Bring Your Dad to Work Day" at her school. Molly, tired of Bud's neglect, has a friend drive her to Larissa's home so she can live there instead. However, Larissa, who is actually addicted to prescription drugs, lashes out at Molly for coming over. Bud, deducing what happened, arrives and comforts Molly, who calls him "dad" for the first time. Bud takes her back to their home amid a flurry of journalists.

The experience serves as a wake-up call for Bud, who stops drinking and starts working with Kate and Molly to understand the issues of the election and make the right choice. Bud reads through his mail from the American public, urging him to vote for the issues that matter. The two candidates hold a debate with Bud serving as the moderator, asking questions from the letters he received. In a written speech, he confesses his regrets about knowing little-to-nothing about politics, or for that matter, life. The next morning, Bud casts his vote as Molly watches with a smile.

== Cast ==
- Kevin Costner as Ernest "Bud" Johnson
- Madeline Carroll as Molly Johnson
- Paula Patton as Kate Madison
- Kelsey Grammer as President Andrew Boone
- Dennis Hopper as Senator Donald Greenleaf
- Nathan Lane as Art Crumb
- Stanley Tucci as Martin Fox
- George Lopez as John Sweeney
- Judge Reinhold as Walter
- Charles Esten as Lewis (credited as Charles 'Chip' Esten)
- Mare Winningham as Larissa Johnson
- Mark Moses as Attorney General Wyatt
- Nana Visitor as Galena Greenleaf
- Floyd Westerman as Chief Running Bear (credited as Floyd 'Red Crow' Westerman)
- Dale O'Malley as Hank Johnson

=== As themselves ===
- Aaron Brown
- Campbell Brown
- Tucker Carlson
- James Carville
- Mary Hart
- Arianna Huffington
- Larry King
- Bill Maher
- Chris Matthews
- Willie Nelson
- Lawrence O'Donnell
- Richard Petty

== Production ==
Swing Vote was shot primarily in Albuquerque and Belen, New Mexico. Although not intended as a political statement on the then-upcoming presidential elections, when Kevin Costner found he could not get the financing he wanted for Swing Vote to get it into theaters in time for the 2008 presidential election, he bankrolled it himself.

Joshua Michael Stern, who directed and co-wrote the script with Jason Richman, had earlier precedents to follow. The premise of the film is similar to an Isaac Asimov story "Franchise", in which elections have evolved until the entire decision is based on the decision of one man. The premise of Garson Kanin’s 1939 movie The Great Man Votes is also very similar to Swing Vote. A 1966 episode of the TV series F Troop, "The Ballot of Corporal Agarn", uses the same basic storyline.

== Reception ==
=== Critical response ===
The film received mostly negative reviews by critics. On Rotten Tomatoes, the film has an approval rating of 38% based on 151 reviews, with an average rating of 5.2/10. The website's critical consensus reads, "Despite Kevin Costner providing his most charismatic performance in years, Swing Vote fails to find the right mix of political satire and heartfelt drama." On Metacritic the film has a weighted average score of 47 out of 100, based on reviews from 30 critics, indicating "mixed or average reviews". Audiences polled by CinemaScore gave the film an average grade of "B" on an A+ to F scale.

Reaction from critics centered on Costner's performance. One characterized it as "unsentimental", but handled "with such ease and conviction" that it anchors the film. Roger Ebert noted that in building the premise, "the movie makes a plucky stab at explaining how it comes to happen – and it almost sounds plausible." He gave it three stars, saying that a "mix of comedy and drama is winning; Costner couldn't be better, and the little girl is a find." Mick LaSalle of the San Francisco Chronicle also gave it favorable reviews. Richard Roeper was quoted as saying, "Not a bad movie, probably OK to rent on DVD, but I'm saying don't rush to the theaters." The Times of the UK ranked Swing Vote no. 14 on its list of the 100 Worst Films of 2008.

=== Box office ===
The film grossed $16,289,867 domestically and $1,344,446 overseas totaling $17,634,313 worldwide. On its opening weekend, the film grossed $6,230,669, placing it #6.

After release, Dennis Hopper said that his role was significantly reduced. Hopper told the New York Daily News, "My [character's] subplot was completely cut. There's a scene we shot where I ditch all my events to go support a young Mexican waitress at the funeral of her grandfather. It was chopped. It was important to the development of my character, and it's missing."

== Lawsuit ==
Bradley Blakeman, a former deputy assistant for appointments and scheduling to President George W. Bush, filed a lawsuit on August 7, 2008, stating that he gave Kelsey Grammer a copyrighted screenplay titled Go November in 2006. The lawsuit, filed at the United States District Court for the Eastern District of New York in Long Island, New York, was against Grammer, Kevin Costner (co-financier), The Walt Disney Company (owner of the film rights), Walt Disney Motion Pictures Group Inc. (production company), and Touchstone Pictures (distributor), and claims that the plot and marketing elements of Swing Vote were stolen from him.

The case was eventually settled for US$10 (equivalent to $14.76 in 2025) after the judge dismissed his other claims against Costner and Disney.

== Home media ==
The film was released by Touchstone Home Entertainment on DVD and Blu-ray Disc on January 13, 2009.
