= Detachment (film) =

2011 film by Tony Kaye

- Directed by: Tony Kaye
- Written by: Carl Lund
- Produced by: Greg Shapiro; Carl Lund; Bingo Gubelmann; Austin Stark; Benji Kohn; Chris Papavasiliou
- Starring: Adrien Brody; Marcia Gay Harden; Christina Hendricks; William Petersen; Bryan Cranston; Tim Blake Nelson; Betty Kaye; Sami Gayle; Lucy Liu; Blythe Danner; James Caan
- Cinematography: Tony Kaye
- Edited by: Barry Alexander Brown; Geoffrey Richman
- Music by: The Newton Brothers
- Distributed by: Tribeca Films
- Release dates: April 25, 2011 (Tribeca); March 16, 2012 (United States)
- Running time: 100 minutes
- Country: United States
- Language: English
- Box office: $1.7 million

Detachment is a 2011 American psychological drama film directed by Tony Kaye and written by Carl Lund. Its story follows Henry Barthes, a high-school substitute teacher who becomes a role model to his students and others. It stars Adrien Brody, Marcia Gay Harden, Christina Hendricks, William Petersen, Bryan Cranston, Tim Blake Nelson, Betty Kaye, Sami Gayle, Lucy Liu, Blythe Danner and James Caan.

Produced by Greg Shapiro, Carl Lund, Bingo Gubelmann, Austin Stark, Benji Kohn, and Chris Papavasiliou, the film was released on March 16, 2012, to mixed reviews.

== Plot ==
Substitute teacher Henry Barthes is called in for a one-month assignment, teaching English classes at a high school with many students performing at a low grade level. During his first class, he observes many acts of hostility and antagonism, including two students verbally harassing pupil Meredith, with whom he becomes acquainted after class.

After school, Henry is called to a care facility to see his grandfather, who has become confused due to his dementia. He frequently believes Henry is Patricia (Henry's mother). On the bus ride home, Henry sees teenage runaway Erica having sex for money, then getting hit by a man who refuses to pay her. Erica attempts to convince Henry to have sex with her, which he refuses.

The next day, Henry reads aloud to the class through the essays from earlier. After reading an anonymous essay which is assumed to be Meredith's, he becomes aware of her struggles with suicidal thoughts. On the way home, Henry again runs into Erica, who he invites up to his apartment and allows her to stay temporarily.

Later, fellow teacher Sarah asks Henry out. Henry returns home late to find Erica still awake, waiting for him. She is upset that he went out without telling her.

Henry is later called into the care facility, because his grandfather has become gravely ill. Henry pretends to be Patricia and reassures him, allowing him to come to peace with dying. After the visit, Henry and Erica go to the park, where Henry details Patricia's suicide. He also implies that his grandfather had sexually abused Patricia, but says that he never felt unsafe around either of them.

Back at school, Meredith shows Henry an artwork that she made for him. She opens up about her struggles and becomes visibly upset, hugging Henry and asking him to console her. Sarah walks in on them, causing Meredith to run away, and she accuses Henry of touching Meredith inappropriately. Henry insists that he was just comforting her, but the accusation leads to a surge of memories about his grandfather and mother. He is overcome by panic, and quickly leaves.

Later that day, Henry is informed of his grandfather's death. Overwhelmed, he tells Erica he can no longer take care of her, and has social services take her to a foster home. She pleads with Henry to let her stay, but he reluctantly maintains his stance.

As Henry's assignment comes to an end, his students show their appreciation for his work. During a break, Henry tries to apologise to Meredith for what happened earlier, but she quickly dismisses the matter. She then kills herself by eating a cupcake that she poisoned. Her death leads Henry into a state of reflection, and he decides to visit Erica in the foster care facility for the first time since they were separated. She euphorically embraces him.

On his last day of teaching, Henry reads to the class the short story "The Fall of the House of Usher" (1839) by Edgar Allan Poe.

== Cast ==
- Adrien Brody as Henry Barthes
- Marcia Gay Harden as Principal Carol Dearden
- Christina Hendricks as Ms. Sarah Madison
- William Petersen as Mr. Sarge Kepler
- Bryan Cranston as Mr. Dearden
- Tim Blake Nelson as Mr. Wiatt
- Betty Kaye as Meredith
- Sami Gayle as Erica Lewis
- Lucy Liu as Dr. Doris Parker
- Blythe Danner as Ms. Perkins
- James Caan as Mr. Charles Seaboldt
- Louis Zorich as Grandpa
- Isiah Whitlock Jr. as Mr. Mathias
- Brennan Brown as Greg Raymond
- Renée Felice Smith as Missy
- Doug E. Doug as Mr. Norris
- Patricia Rae as Ms. Estrada
- Ronen Rubinstein as Gangsta
- Aaron Sauter as Marcus

== Production ==
Filming took place in Mineola Middle School and Mineola High School on Long Island, New York.

In the same month, director Tony Kaye said in an interview. "My agent sent me this fantastic piece of writing by a guy called Carl Lund. A writer. One of the things that I felt was how real it was. And writing is really about research and speech and I thought this guy’s really done his homework. In fact it turned out that he had been a teacher. So then it all became very clear. And then when it really began, if you like, really really began was when Adrien Brody sort of popped up and said I'll do this. A couple of weeks before we were supposed to start to shoot. And then I decided myself at that point I'm gonna hang the whole thing on you [Brody]. And try to build out your character of Henry much more and make it all everything about you. Just you." The interviewer then asks Kaye if he rebuilt the script at that point. Kaye responds, "Well I reinterpreted it, yeah. When Carl first wrote it, I believe it was a very vignette ensemble thing." ”Carl's script was very impressionistic, and [a] part of what I do, sometimes, [is] very impressionistic storytelling. I used that to its full, here, to try and make sense of it all.... There's more [footage] of Marcia Gay Harden and Bryan Cranston [which] I've got in the hard drives, and I'm hoping to [get] it out, in maybe a longer cut."

== Release ==
Detachment premiered on April 25, 2011, at the Tribeca Film Festival. Pretty Pictures acquired rights to distribute the film in France. In September 2011, Tribeca Film acquired U.S. distribution rights with Celluloid Dreams repping worldwide sales rights. Territories sold include Benelux (Wild Bunch), Italy (UBU), Middle East (Shooting Stars), Russia (CP Digital), Latin America (California), India (Pictureworks), Malaysia, Indonesia and Vietnam (PT Parkit) and Taiwan (Cineplex).

On September 9, 2011, Detachment screened in competition at the 37th Deauville American Film Festival in France. It won both the Revelations Prize and the International Critics' Award. On September 18, Detachment was announced as the Closing Night Film at the Woodstock Film Festival, where Kaye was the recipient of the Honorary Maverick Award.

On October 12, 2011, Detachment screened in competition at the Valenciennes International Festival of Action and Adventure Films in France, where it won the Grand Prize and the Audience Award. Later, on October 26, the film screened in competition at the 24th Tokyo International Film Festival. It received the award for Best Artistic Contribution, sharing honors with the film Kora.

Detachment also screened in competition at the 35th São Paulo International Film Festival and won the Audience Award for Best Foreign Language Film, sharing honors with Chicken with Plums. On November 16, Detachment screened at the 53rd Muestra Internacional de Cine in Mexico.

In January 2012, Detachment won Best Picture at the Ramdam Film Festival in Tournai, Belgium.

== Critical response ==
On Rotten Tomatoes, the film has an approval rating of 57% based on 72 reviews, with an average rating of 5.8/10. The website's critics consensus reads: "Detachment's heart is in the right place, but overall it doesn't offer any solutions to its passionate ranting." On Metacritic, the film has a weighted average score of 52 based on reviews from 20 critics.

Peter Travers from Rolling Stone awarded the film three out of four stars, praising the performances of Adrien Brody, Marcia Gay Harden and Lucy Liu. "Detachment gets to you. It hits hard", he wrote.

A reviewer for Student Handouts, which reviews books and films for those working in education, said: "It easily makes Dangerous Minds look like a pandering Lifetime made-for-TV movie."
