= High School (2010 film) =

- Theatrical release poster
- Directed by: John Stalberg, Jr.
- Screenplay by: Erik Linthorst; John Stalberg, Jr.; Stephen Susco
- Story by: John Stalberg, Jr.; Erik Linthorst
- Produced by: Arcadiy Golubovich; Warren Zide; Raymond J. Markovich
- Starring: Adrien Brody; Sean Marquette; Matt Bush; Colin Hanks; Adhir Kalyan; Mykelti Williamson; Michael Chiklis
- Cinematography: Mitchell Amundsen
- Edited by: Gabriel Wrye
- Music by: The Newton Brothers
- Production companies: Parallel Media; Flipzide; Zero Hour Films
- Distributed by: Anchor Bay Films
- Release dates: January 24, 2010 (Sundance); June 1, 2012 (United States; limited)
- Running time: 99 minutes
- Country: United States
- Language: English
- Budget: $10 million
- Box office: $139,034

High School (also known as HIGH school) is a 2010 American teen stoner comedy film starring Adrien Brody. It is the feature-length directorial debut of John Stalberg, Jr. The film premiered at the Sundance Film Festival and was theatrically distributed by Anchor Bay Films on June 1, 2012.

== Plot ==
High school valedictorian-to-be Henry Burke (Matt Bush) takes his first hit of cannabis with his ex-best friend Travis (Sean Marquette), only to learn that, due to a spelling bee champion's recent use of marijuana, their high school is conducting a drug test where anyone caught under the influence of anything will be expelled. Travis knows of a psychotic drug dealer, known as Psycho Ed (Adrien Brody), who carries an exclusive kind of cannabis extract called "kief", and the two boys steal the stash and intend on getting the whole school high, to invalidate the drug test and save Henry's future. But Psycho Ed is right on their trail and so is Dr. Gordon, the school dean.

== Cast ==
Students

- Matt Bush as Henry Burke, Morgan High School's top student who has a bright future ahead of him.
- Sean Marquette as Travis Breaux, Morgan High School's stoner and all around trouble maker.
- Adhir Kalyan as Sebastian Saleem, Henry's academic rival who will do whatever it takes to get what he wants.
- Alicia Sixtos as Sharky Ovante, Henry's childhood friend and love interest.
- Robert Bailey, Jr. as Jeffery, Henry's friend.
- Brett Kelly as Martin Gordon, Principal Gordon's son.
- Luis Chavez and Max Van Ville as Big Dave and Little Dave, resident stoners and Travis' friends.
- Cody Longo as Chad, a jock who spends most of the film searching for the administration offices.
- Camille Mana as Dana, another of Henry's honor roll pals.
- Julia Ling as Charlyne Phuc (pronounced like the profanity), a spelling bee champion who gets high before a competition and has everything taken from her.

Staff

- Michael Chiklis as Dr. Leslie Gordon, the Principal of Morgan High School.
- Colin Hanks as Brandon Ellis, the Assistant Dean.
- Erica Vittana Phillips as Tameka, Dr. Gordon's receptionist and a victim of his sexual harassment.
- Mary Birdsong as Mrs. Gordon, Dr. Gordon's cougar wife.
- Yeardley Smith as Miss Unger, Morgan High School's Computer Skills Teacher who has a sexual fantasy for Bryan Adams.
- Curtis Armstrong as Mr. Armstrong, Morgan High School's History Teacher.
- Michael Vartan as Calculus Teacher, Morgan High School's Calculus Teacher.

Other characters

- Adrien Brody as Edward "Psycho Ed" Highbaugh, Playa Este's resident drug dealer.
- Mykelti Williamson as Paranoid, Psycho Ed's right-hand man.
- Andrew Wilson as Hippie Dude, Psycho Ed's friend.

== Production ==
In 2008, principal photography began at the now named Parker Middle School in Howell, Michigan.

== Reception ==
High School received almost exclusively positive reviews on its film festival circuit, including the Sundance Film Festival and Edinburgh International Film Festival but was delayed by producers for over two years in spite of numerous studio offers to distribute the film. After making changes to the film, music and composed score, the producers finally agreed to release the film through Anchor Bay Films in 2010, garnering mixed reviews with their altered version.

As of June 2020, it holds a 28% approval rating on review site Rotten Tomatoes, based on 54 reviews with an average rating of 4.26/10. Metacritic, which uses a weighted average, assigned the film a score of 31 out of 100, based on 16 critics, indicating "generally unfavorable" reviews.
