= Graves (TV series) =

American TV comedy series (2016–2017)

- Genre: Comedy
- Created by: Joshua Michael Stern
- Starring: Nick Nolte; Skylar Astin; Heléne Yorke; Chris Lowell; Callie Hernandez; Sela Ward
- Composer: Mateo Messina
- Country of origin: United States
- Original language: English
- No. of seasons: 2
- No. of episodes: 20

Production
- Executive producers: Joshua Michael Stern; Greg Shapiro; Keith Eisner; Eric Weinberg
- Producers: Abby Gewanter; Bill Hill; Lisa Parsons; Jaclyn Moore
- Cinematography: David Hennings (season 1); Bradford Lipson (season 2)
- Camera setup: Single-camera
- Running time: 28–34 minutes
- Production companies: Kingsgate Films; My Asylum; Lionsgate Television

Original release
- Network: Epix
- Release: October 16, 2016 – December 10, 2017

Graves is an American comedy television series, created by Joshua Michael Stern, that premiered on October 16, 2016, on Epix. The series stars Nick Nolte as the eponymous Richard Graves, a former President of the United States attempting to make amends for the mistakes he made in office. After two seasons, it was cancelled by Epix in 2017.

== Premise ==
Graves begins when "twenty five years after his presidency, former President Richard Graves has the epiphany that his policies have damaged the country for decades and so, with his young assistant, he goes on a Don Quixote–like journey to right his administration's wrongs just as his wife, the former First Lady, decides to follow her own political ambitions."

== Cast and characters ==
=== Main ===
- Nick Nolte as Richard Graves
- Skylar Astin as Isaiah Miller
- Heléne Yorke as Olivia Graves
- Chris Lowell as Jeremy Graves
- Callie Hernandez as Samantha Vega
- Sela Ward as Margaret Graves

=== Recurring ===
- Roger Bart as Lawrence Mills
- Ernie Hudson as Jacob Mann
- Kathy Najimy as Isaiah's Mother
- Robert Pine as Senator Walsh
- Nora Dunn as Laura Wolf

==== Season 1 ====
- Angelica Maria as Ramona Alvarez
- Nia Vardalos as Annie Spiro
- Tania Gunadi as Summer
- Khotan Fernandez as Arturo Del Rey
- Harry Hamlin as Johnathan Dalton
- Sale Taylor as Chuy
- Conor Leslie as Tasha Ludwig
- Chris Elliott as Thomas Nash

==== Season 2 ====
- Spencer Grammer as Katie Farrell
- Joanna Sanchez as Julia Martinez
- Adam Goldberg as Christopher Sachs
- Wallace Shawn as Jerry North
- Lauren Weedman as Bonnie Clegg
- Michael Cyril Creighton as Phoenix Wells
- Sarah Baker as Becky Keegan
- Juliette Lewis as Bailey Todd

=== Guest ===
- Levi Lobo as Chaco ("Evil Good and Good Evil")
- Bob Balaban as Secretary Burns ("Nothing Can Come of Nothing")
- Alan Dale as Trevor Lloyd ("Lions in Winter")
- Matt Long as Jesse Enright ("The Opposite of People")
- Jacqueline Bisset as Diana Scott ("Something Left to Love")

== Episodes ==
Season	Episodes	Originally released	
Season	Episodes	First released	Last released
1	10	October 16, 2016	December 18, 2016
2	10	October 22, 2017	December 10, 2017

=== Season 1 (2016) ===
No. overall	No. in season	Title	Directed by	Written by	Original release date
1	1	"Evil Good and Good Evil"	Joshua Michael Stern	Joshua Michael Stern	October 16, 2016
2	2	"You Started Everything"	Joshua Michael Stern	Joshua Michael Stern	October 23, 2016
3	3	"Nothing Can Come from Nothing"	Bob Balaban	Abby Gewanter	October 30, 2016
4	4	"That Dare Not Speak"	Bob Balaban	Eric Weinberg	November 6, 2016
5	5	"Lions in Winter"	Robert B. Weide	David Iserson & Joshua Michael Stern	November 13, 2016
6	6	"A Tincture of Madness"	Robert B. Weide	Lisa Parsons & Joshua Michael Stern	November 20, 2016
7	7	"The Careless Giant"	Iain B. MacDonald	Keith Eisner	November 27, 2016
8	8	"TV Is the Shepard"	Iain B. MacDonald	Abby Gewanter	December 4, 2016
9	9	"Through a Glass Gravely"	Frank Coraci	David Iserson & Abby Gewanter	December 11, 2016
10	10	"Not Giants But Windmills"	Iain B. MacDonald	Joshua Michael Stern	December 18, 2016

=== Season 2 (2017) ===
No. overall	No. in season	Title	Directed by	Written by	Original release date
11	1	"Half a World Gone Mad"	Joshua Michael Stern	Joshua Michael Stern	October 22, 2017
12	2	"In His Labyrinth"	Joshua Michael Stern	Abby Gewanter	October 22, 2017
13	3	"The Opposite of People"	Allison Anders	Jaclyn Moore	October 29, 2017
14	4	"Something Left to Love"	Melanie Mayron	Laura Valdivia	November 5, 2017
15	5	"Delights of My Suffering"	Todd Biermann	Rebecca Kirshner	November 12, 2017
16	6	"Cradle to the Graves"	Millicent Shelton	Michael Svoboda	November 19, 2017
17	7	"All the King's Horses"	Mo Marable	Matthew W. Thompson	November 26, 2017
18	8	"They Die Happier"	Megan Griffiths	Jason Orley & Abby Gewanter	December 3, 2017
19	9	"Not All Who Wander Are Lost"	Anton Cropper	Abby Gewanter	December 10, 2017
20	10	"Spark Meet Gasoline"	Joshua Michael Stern	Joshua Michael Stern	December 10, 2017

== Production ==
=== Development ===
On February 26, 2015, it was reported that Epix was in negotiations to give the production a straight-to-series order for a first season consisting of ten episodes. The series was created by Joshua Michael Stern from a script he wrote on spec. Stern was also expected to serve as a director of the series and executive produce alongside Greg Shapiro. Production companies involved with the series were expected to include Lionsgate Television. On May 21, 2015, it was announced Epix had officially ordered the production to series. On June 11, 2015, it was announced that Keith Eisner and Eric Weinberg would serve as additional executive producers for the series. On July 30, 2016, it was announced that the series would premiere on October 16, 2016.

On November 17, 2016, it was announced that series had been renewed for a second season consisting of ten episodes. On July 25, 2017, it was reported that the second season would premiere on October 22, 2017. On December 21, 2017, it was announced that Epix had canceled the series.

=== Casting ===
Alongside the initial series order reporting, it was confirmed that Nick Nolte had been cast in the series' lead role. On July 8, 2015, it was announced that Susan Sarandon had been cast in a starring role. In September 2015, it was reported that Sarandon had withdrawn from her role citing creative differences. Additionally, it was announced that Skylar Astin, Chris Lowell, Angelica Maria, and Heléne Yorke had joined the cast of the series with Yorke in a series regular role. In October 2015, it was announced that Sela Ward had been cast to replace Sarandan, that Callie Hernandez had been cast in series regular role, and that Roger Bart, Ernie Hudson, Tania Gunadi, and Nia Vardalos would appear in a recurring capacity. On November 19, 2015, it was reported that Harry Hamlin had been cast in a recurring role.

In May 2017, it was announced that Adam Goldberg, Spencer Grammer, and Wallace Shawn would appear in season two in a recurring capacity. In June 2017, it was reported that Matt Long, Lauren Weedman, and Joanna Sanchez had joined the cast of season two in recurring roles. In July 2017, it was announced that Michael Cyril Creighton and Juliette Lewis had been cast in recurring for season two.

== Reception ==
=== Critical response ===
The first season was met with a mixed to positive response from critics upon its premiere. On the review aggregation website Rotten Tomatoes, the series holds a 56% approval rating with an average rating of 5.41 out of 10 based on 9 reviews. Metacritic, which uses a weighted average, assigned the series a score of 61 out of 100 based on 10 critics, indicating "generally favorable reviews".

=== Awards and nominations ===
Year	Award	Category	Nominee(s)	Result	Ref.
2017	Golden Globe Awards	Best Actor – Television Series Musical or Comedy	Nick Nolte	Nominated	
