= The Runner (2015 film) =

2015 film by Austin Stark

- Theatrical release poster
- Directed by: Austin Stark
- Written by: Austin Stark
- Produced by: Bingo Gubelmann; Erika Hampson; Benji Kohn; Chris Papavasiliou; Glenn Williamson
- Starring: Nicolas Cage; Connie Nielsen; Peter Fonda; Sarah Paulson; Wendell Pierce
- Cinematography: Elliot Davis
- Edited by: Michael R. Miller
- Music by: The Newton Brothers
- Production companies: Back Lot Pictures; Paper Street Films
- Distributed by: Alchemy
- Release date: August 7, 2015 (United States)
- Running time: 90 minutes
- Country: United States
- Language: English
- Budget: $4 million
- Box office: $20,106

The Runner is a 2015 American political drama film written and directed by Austin Stark in his feature directorial debut. The film stars Nicolas Cage, Connie Nielsen, Peter Fonda, and Sarah Paulson.

The film was released on August 7, 2015, in a limited release and through video on demand by Alchemy.

== Premise ==
In the aftermath of the 2010 Deepwater Horizon oil spill in the Gulf of Mexico, an idealistic politician (Nicolas Cage) is forced to confront his dysfunctional life after his career is destroyed in a sex scandal. The video comes to light after he grants a live interview, and his team members work together to salvage the situation.

== Cast ==
- Nicolas Cage as Colin Pryce
- Connie Nielsen as Deborah Pryce
- Peter Fonda as Rayne Pryce
- Sarah Paulson as Kate Haber
- Wendell Pierce as Frank Legrand
- Bryan Batt as Mark Lavin
- Dana Gourrier as Daria Winston
- Wanetah Walmsley as Layla
- Ciera Payton as Lucy Hall
- David Dino Wells Jr. as Neighborhood Bum (uncredited)

== Production ==
Madeleine Stowe was originally cast to play the female lead but was replaced by Connie Nielsen. On June 18, 2014, Bryan Batt, Peter Fonda, Connie Nielsen, and Wendell Pierce joined the film's cast.

=== Filming ===
Principal photography began on June 23, 2014, in New Orleans, Louisiana. and ended on July 27, 2014. On July 28, Cage was spotted filming at the National Mall in downtown Washington, D.C. The film also shot some scenes in Georgetown.

== Release ==
On June 3, 2015, it was announced Alchemy had acquired distribution rights to the film. It was released in a limited release and through video on demand on August 7, 2015.

=== Box office ===
The film was a box office failure, managing to gross only $20,106 against a budget of $4 million.

== Reception ==
The Runner has received mixed to negative reviews from critics. On review aggregator website Rotten Tomatoes, the film holds a 24% approval rating based on 38 reviews with a weighted average score of 4.68/10. The website's critics consensus reads "In spite of a promising premise and a roundly talented cast, The Runner is a disappointing outing to be viewed by only the staunchest of Nicolas Cage completists." On Metacritic, the film has a normalized score of 39 out of 100, based on 14 reviews, signifying "generally unfavorable reviews".
