= Neverwas =

- DVD cover
- Directed by: Joshua Michael Stern
- Written by: Joshua Michael Stern
- Produced by: Sidney Kimmel; Greg Shapiro
- Starring: Ian McKellen; Aaron Eckhart; Brittany Murphy; Nick Nolte; William Hurt; Jessica Lange
- Cinematography: Michael Grady
- Edited by: Jeff McEvoy
- Music by: Philip Glass
- Production companies: Kingsgate Films; Legacy Filmworks; Sidney Kimmel Entertainment; Neverwas Productions
- Distributed by: Miramax Films
- Release date: September 9, 2005 (Toronto)
- Running time: 108 minutes
- Countries: United States; Canada
- Language: English

Neverwas is a 2005 Canadian-American fantasy drama film, written and directed by Joshua Michael Stern in his directorial debut. It stars Ian McKellen, Aaron Eckhart, Brittany Murphy, Nick Nolte, William Hurt, and Jessica Lange. It was first shown at the 2005 Toronto International Film Festival. However, the film was never given a full theatrical release, eventually being released straight to DVD in 2007.

== Plot ==
Zach Riley is a psychiatrist who leaves a job at a prestigious university to take up a position at the privately run mental institution, Millwood, belonging to Dr. Reed. What he doesn't reveal at the time of his appointment is that this was the very place where his novelist father, T.L. Pierson, spent many years of his life as he battled chronic depression. T.L. later wrote a popular children's classic, Neverwas, about a child (based on young Zach himself) who enters a secret world to free a captive king. T.L. later committed suicide; Riley, who found the body, has always partly blamed himself for his father's death.

Riley is assigned to work with a schizophrenic patient, Gabriel Finch, and soon realizes that Finch sees himself as the captive king. As he listens to Finch and resumes his acquaintance with childhood friend Maggie Paige, he realizes that more things link him to the book – and also to Finch's recovery – than he ever thought. T.L.'s novel was based on Finch's stories, told to him by Finch while both were patients in the hospital. Finch believes that the book is a sort of oracle confirming his personal reality, and that Riley is the boy hero. Riley comes to see himself this way in a sense, as he discovers that Finch's "hallucination" concerns actual places and events.

== Cast ==
- Ian McKellen as Gabriel Finch
- Aaron Eckhart as Zach Riley
- Brittany Murphy as Maggie Paige
- Nick Nolte as T.L. Pierson
- Jessica Lange as Katherine Pierson
- William Hurt as Dr. Peter Reed
- Alan Cumming as Jake
- Vera Farmiga as Eleanna
- Bill Bellamy as Martin Sands
- Michael Moriarty as Dick
- Jen Taylor as Stagehand (uncredited)

== Production ==
=== Development ===
The film was written and directed by filmmaker Joshua Michael Stern in his directorial debut. It was produced by Sidney Kimmel and Greg Shapiro, and co-produced by Aaron Eckhart who starred in the leading role. The film was distributed by Neverwas Productions and premiered at the Toronto International Film Festival on September 9, 2005. It was initially distributed by Miramax Home Entertainment for its home media release. Owing to the theme of a fairy tale which is based on real events, the film has often been compared with Finding Neverland (2004), which Miramax were also involved with.

=== Filming ===
Principal photography took place in September 2004 in Vancouver, British Columbia, Canada.

== Home media ==
The film's U.S. DVD from Miramax Home Entertainment was released on July 3, 2007.

On February 14, 2012, Echo Bridge Home Entertainment reissued Neverwas on DVD. In 2011, Filmyard Holdings licensed the Miramax library to streamer Netflix. This deal included Neverwas, and ran for five years, eventually ending on June 1, 2016.

On March 4, 2021, Neverwas was made available on Paramount's streaming service Paramount+, as one of its inaugural launch titles.
