= Castration Celebration =

2009 novel by Jake Wizner

- Author: Jake Wizner
- Language: English
- Genre: Young adult fiction
- Publisher: Random House
- Publication date: May 26, 2009
- Publication place: United States
- Media type: Print Hardcover
- Pages: 291pp
- ISBN: 978-0-375-85215-2

Castration Celebration is a 2009 young adult novel by Jake Wizner. The book was released on May 26, 2009, through Random House and follows the events of a group of friends during their summer together at Yale University’s summer arts program. Shakespeare Shapiro from Wizner's previous novel Spanking Shakespeare makes a short appearance in this novel.

== Synopsis ==
The book follows Max and Olivia, two teenagers that are attending a summer arts program at Yale. Max is a drama student while Olivia is in the process of writing a feminist musical about the sex lives of teenagers and their often unrealistic portrayal in high-school movies. The two characters clash, as Olivia has chosen to stay away from men while Max has a goal of trying to pick up every woman he meets.

== Critical response ==
Reception for Castration Celebration was mixed to negative, with Kirkus Reviews commenting that the characters often came across as "caricatures rather than three-dimensional characters". Publishers Weekly also gave a mixed review, saying that although American Pie fans would enjoy the novel, "the relentless and explicit banter can be exhausting". Common Sense Media panned the book overall, giving it 2 out of 5 stars and an overall summary of "Crass, explicit novel tries to be provocative, ends up lame". The Bulletin of the Center for Children's Books also panned the book, saying that "while some readers will undoubtedly find the banter amusing in a shock-jock sort of way, the book reinforces tired battle-of-the-sexes and horny teen stereotypes, showing little respect for the complex intellectual or emotional capacities of its audience".
