= Muzzle (film) =

Film by John Stalberg Jr.

- Theatrical release poster
- Directed by: John Stalberg Jr.
- Screenplay by: Carlyle Eubank
- Story by: John Stalberg Jr.; Carlyle Eubank
- Produced by: John Stalberg Jr.; David Frigerio
- Starring: Aaron Eckhart; Penelope Mitchell; Diego Tinoco; Paul Johansson; Kyle Smithson; Delissa Reynolds; Stephen Lang
- Cinematography: Pieter Vermeer
- Edited by: Bella Erikson
- Music by: Paul Gallister
- Production companies: Highland Film Group; Slow Burn; Broken Open Pictures; Studio 507
- Distributed by: RLJE Films
- Release date: September 29, 2023
- Running time: 100 minutes
- Country: United States
- Language: English
- Box office: $24,353

Muzzle is a 2023 American action-thriller film produced and directed by John Stalberg Jr. and written by Carlyle Eubank. It stars Aaron Eckhart, Penelope Mitchell, Diego Tinoco, Paul Johansson, Kyle Smithson, Delissa Reynolds and Stephen Lang.

== Plot ==
After his K-9 partner Ace is killed in LA's Skid Row, and he assaults a paramedic for not treating the dog, Officer Jake Rosser plummets deep into an investigation to uncover the truth about who may be responsible. He is forced to attend mandatory therapy in order to retain his K-9 handler status. While doing this he begins his own investigation into his partner's death. He then picks a second dog named Socks. His investigation leads to a cartel who use K-9s as well for nefarious purposes and dupe Socks away from Rosser. During the final confrontation, he manages to trick the female cartel leader to utter the German word selbstmord for suicide and snaps his finger, causing Socks and its counterpart to both attack the female. The female is injured, but shoots Socks. In the end, five victims' human remains are said to be discovered among 100 million tons of garbage in an area landfill, but the bodies are so decomposed that it could take months to uncover the identity, if ever. Rosser is then separately seen driving a car with his son in the backseat born to Mia who is walking Socks with its right forelimb amputated.

== Cast ==
- Aaron Eckhart as Jake Rosser
- Penelope Mitchell as Mia
- Diego Tinoco as Hernandez
- Stephen Lang as Leland
- Delissa Reynolds as Detective Ramos
- Kyle Smithson as Officer O'Keefe
- Grainger Hines as Aldo Damon
- Nick Searcy as Captain Freeman
- Paul Johansson as Officer Reed
- Hemky Madera as Santiago Perez

== Production ==
Principal photography took place in Louisville, Kentucky in August 2022.

== Release ==
Muzzle was released by RLJE Films on September 29, 2023.

== Reception ==
On the review aggregator website Rotten Tomatoes, the film has an approval rating of 36%, with an average score of 5.3/10, based on reviews from 11 critics.

Sheila O'Malley of RogerEbert.com awarded the film one and a half stars.

== Sequel ==
In May 2024, a sequel titled Muzzle: City of Wolves was announced with Aaron Eckhart set to reprise his role as Jake Rosser and John Stalberg Jr. returning to direct. The script will be written by Jacob Michael King from a story by Carlyle Eubank and Stalberg Jr which will follow Rosser as he attempts to lead a peaceful life with his family and retired K-9 companion, Socks, only for a ruthless gang to target them in a brutal attack sending him in search of vengeance in the criminal underworld to protect his family.
