= Austin Stark =

American film producer and writer (born 1979)

- Born: May 31, 1979 (age 46)
- Occupation(s): Film director, writer, producer
- Years active: 2007–present

Austin Stark (born May 31, 1979) is an American film director, writer, and producer best known for films that explore social issues, from mental illness in Infinitely Polar Bear to class conflict in Coup!

== Career ==
Stark began his career in 2007 working with Academy Award winning producer Martin Richards (Chicago).

In 2015, Stark made his writing and directorial debut with The Runner, a political drama that follows a Louisiana congressman in the aftermath of the 2010 BP oil spill. The movie stars Nicolas Cage, Sarah Paulson, Connie Nielsen, and Peter Fonda. It was released in theaters nationwide on August 7, 2015 by Alchemy.

In 2021, Stark wrote and directed The God Committee, a medical thriller about the world of organ transplantation, starring Kelsey Grammer, Colman Domingo and Julia Stiles. The film premiered at the 2021 Tribeca Film Festival and was released theatrically by Vertical Entertainment and Netflix. Upon release, the film reached the Netflix Top 10 movie list in the United States.

Stark’s latest film Coup!, a darkly comedic thriller set during the 1918 Spanish Flu, follows a rebellious servant who leads a revolt against his wealthy employer. The film stars Peter Sarsgaard, Billy Magnussen and Sarah Gadon. On September 8, 2023, it debuted in the Giornate degli Autori section of the 80th Venice International Film Festival.

In addition to writing and directing, Stark has produced numerous films. His most well-known film Infinitely Polar Bear, starring Mark Ruffalo and Zoe Saldana, was released theatrically by Sony Pictures Classics and earned Ruffalo a nomination for the 73rd Golden Globe Awards under the category Best Actor - Comedy. Other films Stark has produced include:

- Peter and Vandy (2009), nominated for the Grand Jury Prize at the 2009 Sundance Film Festival.
- Werner Herzog's My Son, My Son, What Have Ye Done? (2009), starring Michael Shannon and Willem Dafoe.
- Happythankyoumoreplease (2010), winner of the Audience Award at the 2010 Sundance Film Festival;
- Tony Kaye's Detachment (2011), starring Adrien Brody;
- Hello I Must Be Going (2012), nominated for the Grand Jury Prize at the 2012 Sundance Film Festival;

== Personal life ==
Stark is a graduate of Georgetown University where he studied literature.

== Filmography ==
Year	Film	Type	Credited as		
Year	Film	Type	Director	Producer	Writer
2003	Killing Pedro Rivera	Short Film	Yes	Yes	Yes
2006	Love/Death/Cobain	Short Film	Yes	Yes	Yes
2007	My Biodegradable Heart	Short Film	No	Yes	No
2009	Peter and Vandy	Feature Film	No	Yes	No
2009	Homecoming	Feature Film	No	Yes	No
2009	My Son, My Son, What Have Ye Done?	Feature Film	No	Yes	No
2009	Repo Chick	Feature Film	No	Yes	No
2010	Happythankyoumoreplease	Feature Film	No	Yes	No
2011	Detachment	Feature Film	No	Yes	No
2012	Hello I Must Be Going	Feature Film	No	Yes	No
2014	Infinitely Polar Bear	Feature Film	No	Yes	No
2015	The Runner	Feature Film	Yes	No	Yes
2021	The God Committee	Feature Film	Yes	Yes	Yes
2023	Coup!	Feature Film	Yes	No	Yes
