= The God Committee =

- Theatrical release poster
- Directed by: Austin Stark
- Written by: Austin Stark; Mark St. Germain (play)
- Produced by: Molly Conners; Amanda Bowers; Jonathan Rubenstein; Ari Pinchot; Jane Oster; Bingo Gubelmann; Benji Kohn
- Starring: Kelsey Grammer; Julia Stiles; Janeane Garofalo; Dan Hedaya; Colman Domingo
- Cinematography: Matt Sakatani Roe
- Edited by: Alan Canant
- Music by: The Newton Brothers
- Production companies: Crystal City Entertainment; Paper Street Films; Phiphen Pictures; Plain Jane Pictures; KGB Films
- Distributed by: Vertical Entertainment
- Release dates: June 20, 2021 (Tribeca); July 2, 2021 (United States)
- Running time: 98 minutes
- Country: United States
- Language: English
- Box office: $32,934

The God Committee is a 2021 American drama film, adapted and directed by Austin Stark, based on the play of the same name by Mark St. Germain. It stars Kelsey Grammer, Julia Stiles, Janeane Garofalo, Dan Hedaya, and Colman Domingo. The film focuses on organ transplant systems and the impact they have on the people involved.

The film had its world premiere at the Tribeca Film Festival on June 20, 2021. It was released on July 2, 2021, by Vertical Entertainment.

== Plot ==
An organ transplant committee has one hour to decide which of three patients deserves a life-saving heart. Seven years later, the committee members struggle with the consequences of that fateful decision.

== Cast ==
- Kelsey Grammer as Dr. Andre Boxer
- Julia Stiles as Dr. Jordan Taylor
- Colman Domingo as Father Dunbar
- Janeane Garofalo as Dr. Valerie Gilroy
- Dan Hedaya as Emmett Granger
- Peter Kim as Dr. Allen Lau
- Patricia R. Floyd as Nurse Wilkes

== Production ==
In March 2019, it was announced Kelsey Grammer, Julia Stiles, Colman Domingo, Janeane Garofalo, and Dan Hedaya had joined the cast of the film, with Austin Stark directing from a screenplay he wrote.

Principal photography began in March 2019.

== Release ==
The film had its world premiere at the Tribeca Film Festival on June 20, 2021. Prior to, Vertical Entertainment acquired distribution rights to the film, and set it for a July 2, 2021, release. It was previously scheduled to premiere at the Tribeca Film Festival in April 2020, but the festival was delayed due to the COVID-19 pandemic.

== Reception ==
The God Committee received generally favorable reviews. On the review aggregator website Rotten Tomatoes, the film received a fresh rating, with a 66% approval, based on 29 reviews. The website's consensus reads, "The God Committee's strong cast and compelling ethical dilemma are ill served by a convoluted story with a disappointing tendency toward melodrama."
