= Joshua Michael Stern =

American film director and screenwriter (born 1961)

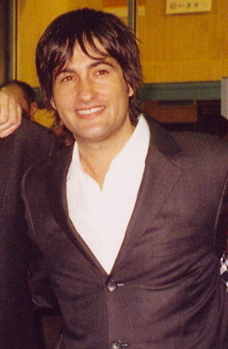
- Stern at the premiere of Neverwas, 2005
- Born: January 12, 1961 (age 65)
- Occupations: Film director, screenwriter
- Years active: 1996–present
- Notable work: Neverwas, Swing Vote, Jobs, Graves

Joshua Michael Stern (born January 12, 1961) is an American film director and screenwriter. He has directed three feature films: Neverwas (2005), Swing Vote (2008) and the 2013 biographical film Jobs, based on the life of Steve Jobs. He also created the political comedy television series Graves (2016–2017).

== Filmography ==
Film

Year	Title	Director	Writer	Producer	Notes
1996	Amityville Dollhouse		Yes		Direct-to-video
2005	Neverwas	Yes	Yes		
2007	The Contractor		Yes		Direct-to-video
2008	Swing Vote	Yes	Yes		Role: "Commercial director"
2013	Jobs	Yes		Yes	

Television

Year	Title	Director	Producer	Writer	Notes
1997	Skeletons			Yes	TV movie
1999	Survivor			Yes	TV movie
2016–2017	Graves	Yes	Yes	Yes	Also creator; directed 5 episodes
2021	Why Women Kill			Yes	Episode "Lady in the Lake"
