= Diego Tinoco =

American actor (born 1997)

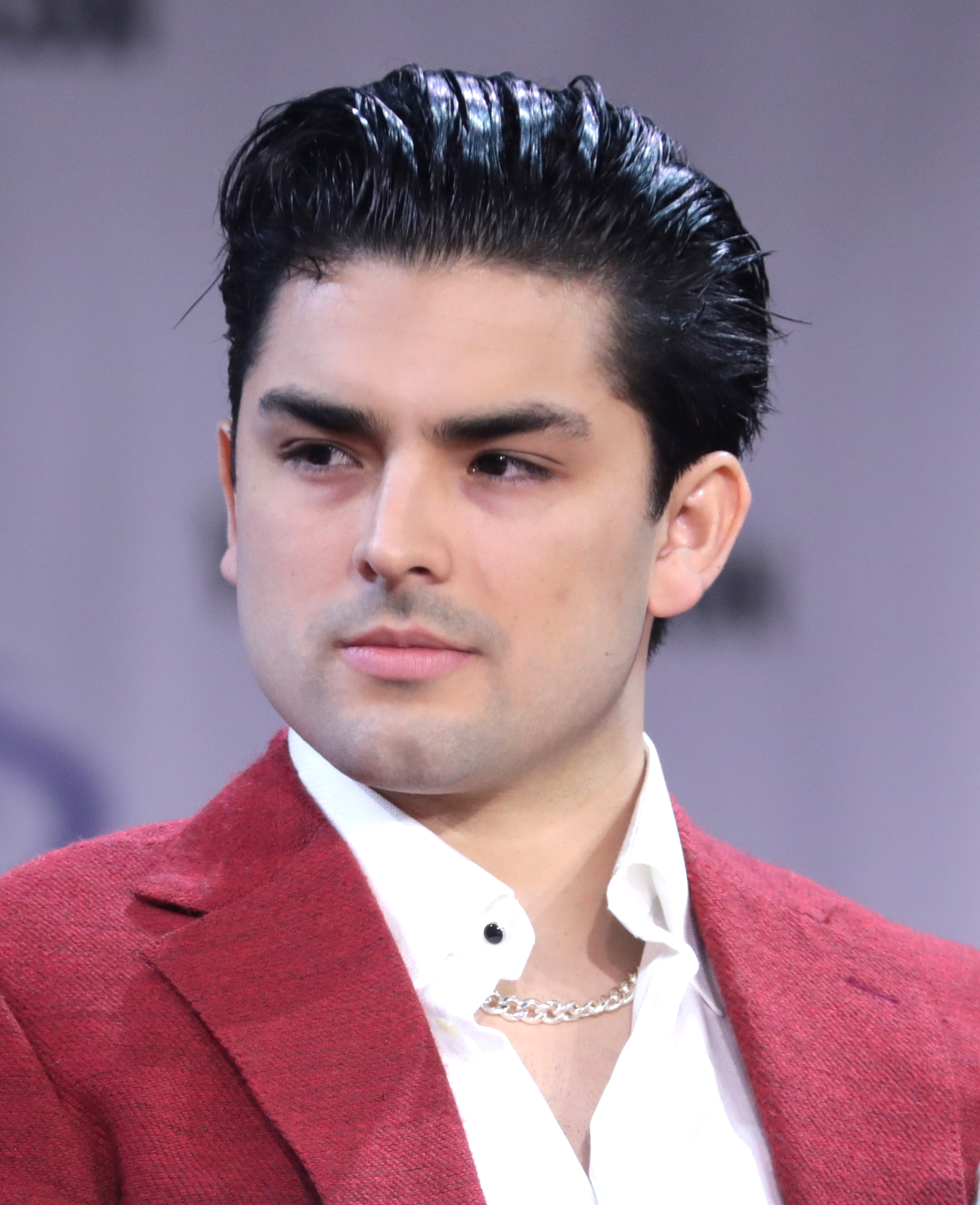
- Tinoco at the 2023 WonderCon
- Born: Diego Alejandro Tinoco; November 25, 1997 (age 28); Cincinnati, Ohio, U.S.
- Occupation: Actor
- Years active: 2015–present

Diego Alejandro Tinoco (born November 25, 1997) is an American actor. He is best known for playing Cesar Diaz in Netflix series On My Block.

== Early life ==
Tinoco was born on November 25, 1997, in Cincinnati, Ohio and grew up in Anaheim, California. His father is Mexican from Michoacán and his mother is of Ecuadorian descent from Quito.

== Career ==
Tinoco debuted as an actor in the 2015 short film, Drizzle of Hope interpreting the role of Marco. In 2016, he appeared in the TV series Teen Wolf as Mateo in season 6, episodes 1 & 6.

In the 2017 short film, Welcome to Valhalla, he played the character of Diego. Tinoco played the lead role of Cesar Diaz in the Netflix television series, On My Block.

In 2021, Tinoco played the role of Tybalt in the romantic drama film R#J. In 2022, he was announced as part of the cast of the film Knights of the Zodiac, where he played the role as Nero the Phoenix Knight.

In late June 2023, he was named one of the "50 Más Bellos" (50 Most Beautiful) by People en Español Magazine.

== Filmography ==
=== Films ===
Year	Title	Role	Notes	Ref.
2015	Drizzle of Hope	Marco	Short film	
2017	Welcome to Valhalla	Diego	Short film	
2021	R#J	Tybalt		
2023	Knights of the Zodiac	Phoenix Nero	Main role	
2023	Muzzle	Hernandez		
2024	Bad Hombres	Felix	Main role	

=== Television ===
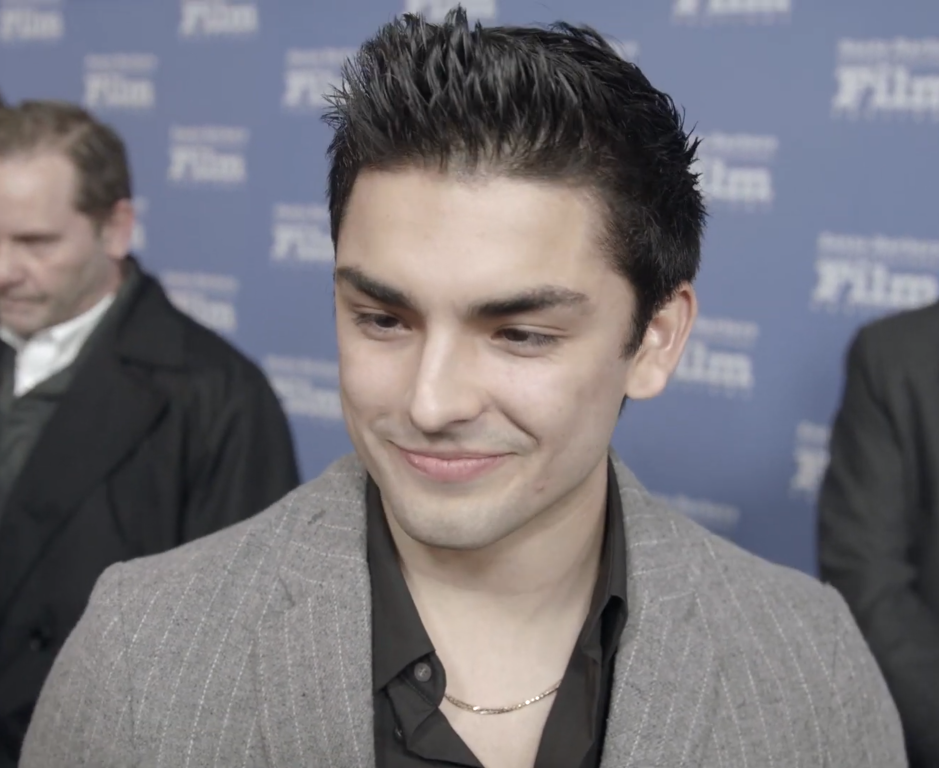
Tinoco at the 2020 Santa Barbara International Film Festival

Year	Title	Role	Notes
2016	Teen Wolf	Mateo	Episode: "Memory Lost"
2018–2021	On My Block	Cesar Osrosco Díaz	Main role
2023	Hailey's On It!	Javier (voice)	Episode: "Kristine-ceañera/The Puffle Kerfuffle"

== Accolades ==
Year	Award	Category	Nominee	Result	Ref.
2019	Teen Choice Awards	Choice Summer TV Actor	Himself	Nominated	
