= Tony Kaye (director) =

British film director (born 1952)

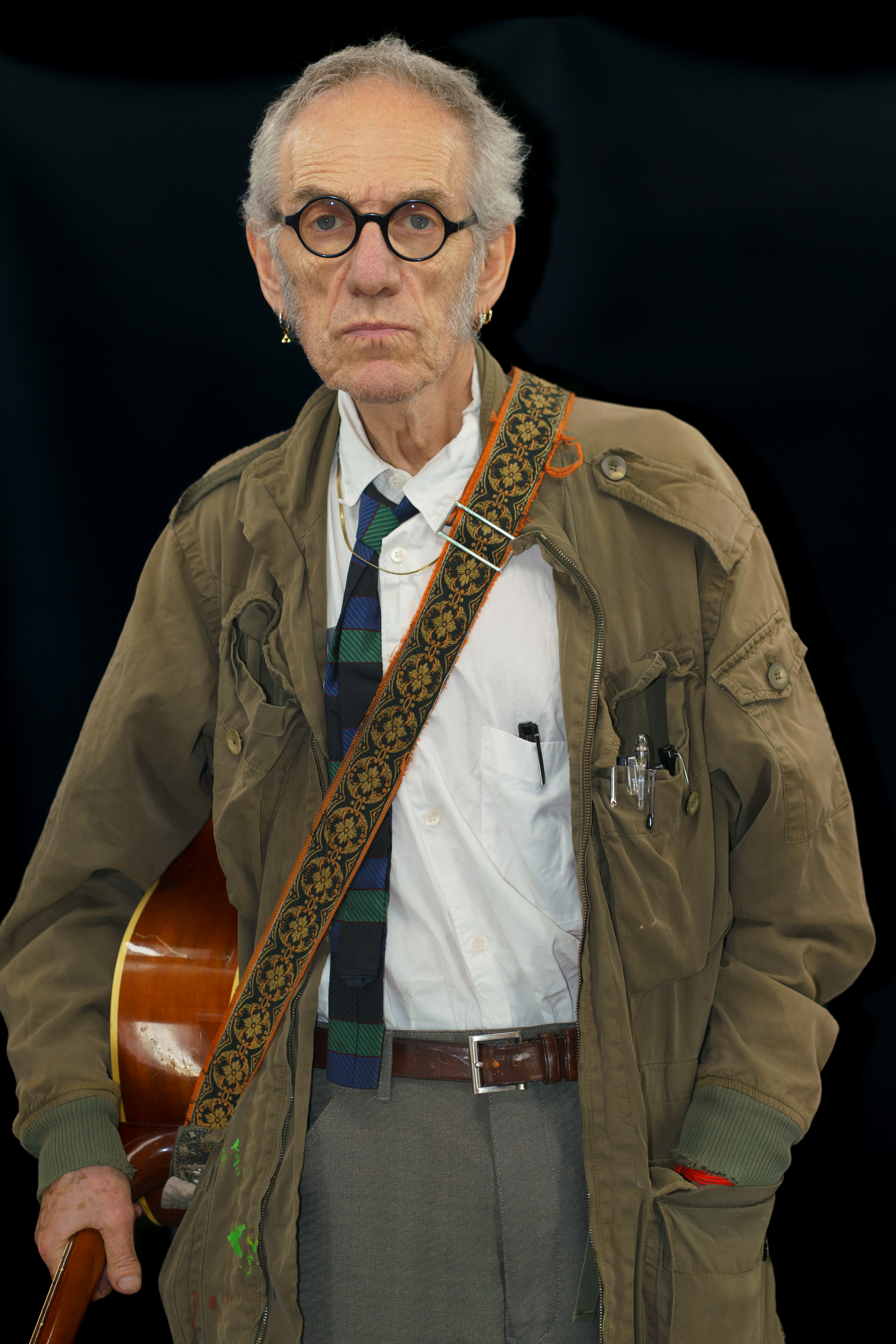
- Kaye at the 2026 Tribeca Film Festival WikiPortraits Portrait Studio
- Born: 8 July 1952 (age 74); London, England
- Occupations: Director; cinematographer; producer; screenwriter; actor; writer; poet; singer; songwriter; painter
- Years active: 1980s–present
- Spouse: Yan Lin Kaye
- Children: 4

Tony Kaye (born 8 July 1952) is an English director of films, music videos, advertisements, and documentaries. He directed the 1998 film American History X.

== Early life ==
Tony was born to a Haredi Jewish family in Stamford Hill, London, United Kingdom.

== Career ==
He made his name as a director of television commercials with award-winning spots for British Rail InterCity ("Relax", 1988) and the Solid Fuel Advisory Council ("Furry Friends", 1988), as well as his 1993 advertisement for Dunlop Tyres ("Tested for the Unexpected") set to the sound of "Venus in Furs" by the Velvet Underground. By 1996 he had won 23 British Design and Art Direction (D&AD) awards, and in 2012 was jointly named "most awarded director" (co-equal with Frank Budgen) at the organisation's 50th anniversary.

Kaye made several music videos, including the video for "God's Gonna Cut You Down" by Johnny Cash, which won a Grammy Award, "Dani California" by Red Hot Chili Peppers, "What God Wants" by Roger Waters, and "Help Me" and "Runaway Train" by Soul Asylum.

=== American History X ===
His feature film debut was American History X (1998), a drama about racism starring Edward Norton and Edward Furlong. Kaye disowned the final cut of the film and unsuccessfully attempted to have his name removed from the credits. The film was critically lauded and Norton was nominated for the Academy Award for Best Actor for his performance in the film. The battle over artistic control of the film, which has become part of Hollywood folklore, all but destroyed Kaye's career. He delivered his original cut on time and within budget – but when the producer, New Line Cinema, insisted on changes, the arguments began. The debate quickly escalated. Kaye spent $100,000 of his own money to take out 35 full-page ads in the Hollywood trade press denouncing Norton and the producer, using quotations from a variety of people from John Lennon to Abraham Lincoln. He attended a meeting at New Line to which (to ease negotiations) he brought a Catholic priest, a Jewish rabbi and a Tibetan monk. When the company offered him an additional eight weeks to re-cut the film, he said he had discovered a new vision and needed a year to remake it, and collaborated with Nobel Prize-winning poet Derek Walcott on new narration for the script. Finally, when the Directors Guild refused to let him remove his name from the New Line version of the film, he demanded it to be credited to "Humpty Dumpty" instead, and filed a $200 million lawsuit when the company refused.

=== Later career ===
Kaye's second feature, a documentary called Lake of Fire, was about the abortion debate in the United States. It opened in Toronto in September 2006. The movie was shortlisted for the Academy Award for Best Documentary Feature (though it did not earn a nomination), and was nominated for Best Documentary Film at the Independent Spirit Awards, the Chicago Film Critics Association Awards, and the Satellite Awards. Lake of Fire took Kaye 18 years to make.

Kaye's third feature film was a crime drama titled Black Water Transit starring Laurence Fishburne, Karl Urban, Evan Ross, Brittany Snow, and Stephen Dorff. The film was shot in New Orleans during the summer of 2007. A rough cut was screened at the 2009 Cannes Film Festival but the film was never released to cinemas. As of 2017 the film is unfinished due to the production company's bankruptcy and the ensuing litigation.

Kaye's fourth feature film, Detachment (2011), starring Adrien Brody, as well as featuring Kaye's daughter Betty, is a drama about teachers. It centers on Brody as a struggling substitute teacher in a failing New York public school. It premiered in April 2011 at the Tribeca Film Festival. The film screened and won awards at the following film festivals: Deauville American Film Festival, Woodstock film festival (Honorary Maverick Award for Kaye) Valenciennes International Festival of Action and Adventure Films in France, Tokyo International Film Festival, São Paulo International Film Festival, and Ramdam Film Festival in Tournai, Belgium.

In early 2016 Kaye was set to direct Joe Vinciguerra's screenplay titled Stranger Than the Wheel, starring Shia LaBeouf, and in 2018 he was to direct Honorable Men, a crime drama written by Gary DeVore. However, neither project has since come to fruition. Since 2020, he has announced several new projects in development: African History Y starring Djimon Hounsou; Civil, a drama set amid the civil rights movement; and Tremendum, a partially animated film inspired by conversations Kaye had with Marlon Brando.

In 2022, it was announced he would direct the dark comedy film The Trainer written by Vito Schnabel and Jeff Solomon. The film premiered at the 2024 Rome Film Festival.

== Personal life ==
Kaye's wife is Chinese-American artist Yan Lin Kaye. They have two daughters: Shanghai and Eema Emet Kaye.

== Filmography ==
=== Film ===
Year	Title	Director	Writer	Producer	DoP	Notes	Ref.
Released
1998	American History X	Yes	No	No	Yes		
2006	Lake of Fire	Yes	Yes	Yes	Yes	Documentary film	
2011	Detachment	Yes	No	No	Yes		
2024	The Trainer	Yes	No	Yes	Yes		
2026	Humpty Dumpty X	Yes	Yes	Yes	Yes	Documentary film	
Unreleased
2001	Lobby Lobster	Yes	Yes	Yes	Yes	Experimental film	
2001	Lying for a Living	Yes	No	No	No	Documentary films	
2007	Humpty Dumpty and the Kabbalah	Yes	Yes	Yes	Yes	Documentary films	
2009	Black Water Transit	Yes	No	No	Yes		
2020	The Hong Kong Sound	Yes	Yes	Yes	Yes	Documentary film	
2021	Tremendum	Yes	Yes	Yes	Yes		

=== Unrealized projects ===
Year	Title and description	Ref.
1990s	Stranger Than the Wheel, a "serial drama" written by Joe Vinciguerra about a young man who struggles to reconnect with his father	
1990s	Untitled M. Night Shyamalan screenplay	
1990s	A film adaptation of Tennessee Williams' short story "One Arm"	
1990s	Only Seventeen, a film about a 17-year-old girl who contracts AIDS after having sex for the second time	
1990s	Untitled documentary about the killing of black South African girl by Nicholas Steyn, a 42-year-old white farmer	
2000s	Reaper, a thriller film starring Liv Tyler	
2000s	Paranoia, an indie thriller written by Jon Ladd about an ad agency executive who becomes a suspect in a murder case	
2000s	Penitentiary, an action thriller written by Carl Lund about corporate-backed prison prizefighting	
2000s	Zero Point, a film about a doctor who discovers a new energy source	
2000s	Steps, a film about a businessman who is forced to revisit everyone he has wronged in his life when his daughter is kidnapped	
2010s	Attachment, an indie thriller written by Christopher Denham starring Sharon Stone and Tom Felton	
2010s	North/South/East/West, a film written by Zack Ford starring Evan Ross, Peter Dinklage and Terrence Howard	
2010s	Untitled TV series	
2010s	Untitled biopic on the life and death of Hollywood actress Peg Entwistle	
2010s	Honorable Men, an indie crime drama based on an unproduced screenplay by Gary DeVore	
2010s	2nd Born, a sequel to 1st Born starring an A.I.-generated robot as the lead	
2020s	Civil, a drama set during the civil rights movement written by Austin Wright and Adam Knox about two young men from opposite sides	
2020s	African History Y, a film written by Charles Chanchori and Jason Corder starring Djimon Hounsou	
