= Carlyle Eubank =

American writer and screenwriter

- Born: Carlyle Chilton Eubank III
- Education: Amherst College
- Occupation: Screenwriter
- Years active: 2011–present
- Notable work: The Signal; Muzzle; Broke
- Relatives: William Eubank (brother)

Carlyle Eubank is an American writer and screenwriter. His 2014 film The Signal, starring Laurence Fishburne, Brenton Thwaites, and Olivia Cooke, premiered at the 2014 Sundance Film Festival and was released in US theaters on June 13 by Focus Features.

== Background ==
Eubank attended Amherst College where he majored in English and Literature. He has drawn inspiration from his studying of literature, saying in an interview that he is especially influenced by the "weird, idiosyncratic characters in the Russian canon".

While writing The Signal, Eubank drew on numerous personal experiences. Himself a track and cross country runner, having run all four years of high school, where he won the CIF Southern Section Division 4 1600, and having run all four years of college, Eubank made two of the main characters cross country runners at MIT. The film features a number of flashbacks to East Coast cross-country races, and the main characters are placed in a number of situations of physical peril. While working on the script, Eubank was affected by his 2011 attempt to summit Mount Everest in which his climbing partner died during the expedition.

A lover of carpentry, Eubank worked as a set builder on both the 2011 film Love and The Signal, for the latter of which he also fashioned a number of makeshift effects.

== Bibliography ==
- The Sound of Steinbeck (Book, Archival Material). Amherst Press. 2010. OCLC 654107444.
