= John Stalberg Jr. =

American film director

- Born: March 7, 1976 (age 49); Hollywood, California, U.S.
- Occupations: Film director; producer; screenwriter

John Stalberg Jr. (born March 7, 1976) is an American film director, producer and screenwriter.

== Career ==
Stalberg directed a short film in 2005 entitled Mr. Dramatic which begun his professional filmmaking career. His feature directorial debut High School premiered at the Sundance Film Festival, and was distributed theatrically in North America by Anchor Bay Entertainment on June 1, 2012. He next directed the Lionsgate film Crypto starring Beau Knapp, Alexis Bledel and Kurt Russell. Stalberg then directed Bad Hombres starring Diego Tinoco, Hemky Madera, Thomas Jane, Tyrese Gibson, Luke Hemsworth and Nick Cassavetes. He next produced and directed Muzzle starring Aaron Eckhart and Stephen Lang, which was released by IFC Entertainment Group. The success of Muzzle spawned a sequel, Muzzle: City of Wolves, also released by IFC Entertainment Group.

== Filmography ==
Year	Film	Director	Writer	Producer	Notes
2005	Mr Dramatic	Yes	Yes	Yes	Short film
2010	High School	Yes	Yes	Executive	Premiered at the Sundance Film Festival
2019	Crypto	Yes	No	Executive	
2023	Bad Hombres	Yes	Story	Yes	
2023	Muzzle	Yes	Story	Yes	
2024	Land of Bad	No	No	Executive	
2025	Broke	No	No	Yes	
2025	Muzzle: City of Wolves	Yes	Story	Yes	
