= Aminé discography =

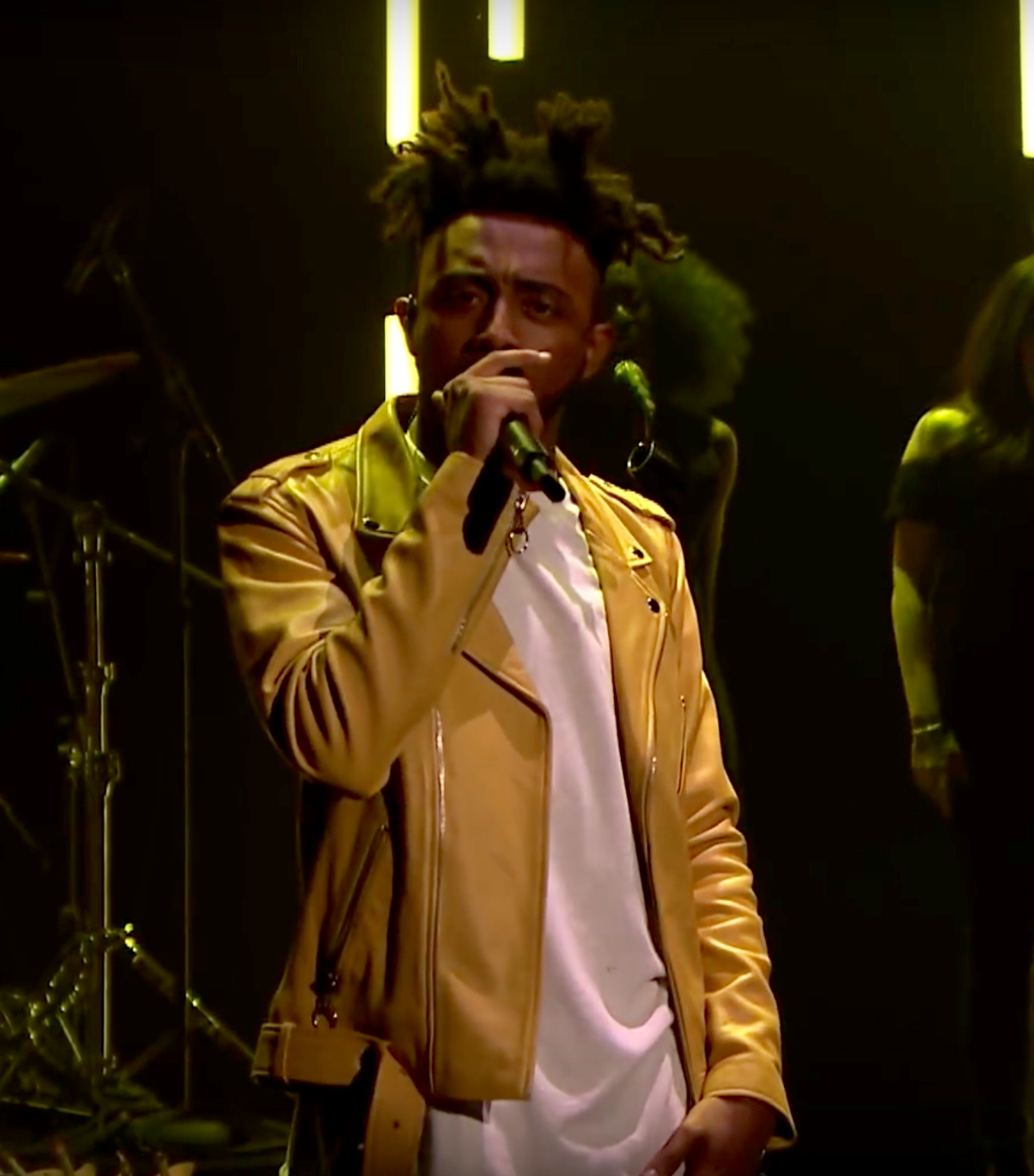
- Aminé performing on The Tonight Show Starring Jimmy Fallon in 2017
- Studio albums: 3
- EPs: 2
- Singles: 16
- Mixtapes: 4
- Promotional singles: 6

American rapper Aminé, has released three studio albums, four mixtapes, one extended play, sixteen singles (including four singles as a featured artist), and six promotional singles. Aminé released his debut mixtape, Odyssey to Me, which was followed up by his debut extended play, En Vogue, with both projects being released in 2014. Aminé went on to release his second mixtape, Calling Brío, in August 2015. In March 2016, Aminé released his breakthrough single "Caroline", which peaked at number 11 on the US Billboard Hot 100 chart. The song was later certified 6× platinum by the RIAA.

Aminé's debut studio album Good for You was released in July 2017 and peaked at number 31 on the US Billboard 200 chart. The album spawned the singles: "Caroline", "Heebiejeebies", "Turf", "Wedding Crashers" and "Spice Girl".

== Albums ==
=== Studio albums ===
List of studio albums, with selected details, chart positions and certifications
Title	Album details	Peak chart positions									Certifications
Title	Album details	US	US R&B /HH	US Rap	AUS	BEL (FL)	CAN	IRE	NZ	UK	Certifications
Good for You	Released: July 28, 2017; Label: CLBN, Republic; Format: CD, LP, Digital download, streaming	31	19	15	—	—	59	—	— (Note: Good for You did not enter the NZ Top 40 Albums Chart, but peaked at number three on the NZ Heatseekers Albums Chart.)	—	RIAA: Platinum
Limbo	Released: August 7, 2020; Label: CLBN, Republic; Format: CD, LP, digital download, streaming	16	10	10	56	83	16	45	24	70	
13 Months of Sunshine	Released: May 16, 2025; Label: CLBN, 10K Projects; Format: CD, LP, digital download, streaming	—	—	—	—	—	—	—	—	—	
"—" denotes items which were not released in that country or failed to chart.

=== Collaborative albums ===
List of collaborative albums, with selected details and chart positions
Title	Album details	Peak chart positions				
Title	Album details	US	US R&B /HH	CAN	NZ	UK
Kaytraminé (with Kaytranada as Kaytraminé)	Released: May 19, 2023; Label: CLBN, Venice Music; Format: Digital download, streaming	92	41	51	9	71

=== Mixtapes ===
List of mixtapes, with selected details and chart positions
Title	Mixtape details	Peak chart positions						
Title	Mixtape details	US	US R&B /HH	US Rap	AUS	BEL (FL)	CAN	NZ
Odyssey to Me	Released: January 17, 2014; Label: Self-released; Format: Digital download	—	—	—	—	—	—	—
Calling Brío	Released: August 31, 2015; Label: Self-released; Format: Digital download	—	—	—	—	—	—	—
OnePointFive	Released: August 15, 2018; Label: Republic; Format: Digital download, streaming, vinyl	53	25	23	—	—	61	—
TwoPointFive	Released: November 5, 2021; Label: Self-released; Format: Digital download, streaming, vinyl	98	—	—	88	145	96	39
"—" denotes items which were not released in that country or failed to chart.

== Extended plays ==
List of extended plays, with selected details
Title	EP details
En Vogue	Released: September 4, 2014; Label: Self-released; Format: Digital download
MY BABY	Released: May 14, 2021; Label: Self-released; Format: Digital download, Streaming
.mp3s	Released: November 20, 2024; Label: CLBN; Format: Digital download, Streaming

== Singles ==
=== As lead artist ===
List of singles, with selected chart positions and certifications, showing year released and album name
Title	Year	Peak chart positions							Certifications	Album
Title	Year	US	US R&B/HH	US Rap	US Rhy.	CAN	NZ	UK	Certifications	Album
"Caroline"	2016	11	5	4	3	33	16	—	RIAA: 6× Platinum; BPI: Silver; MC: Platinum; RMNZ: Gold	Good for You
"Baba"	2016	—	—	—	—	—	—	—		Non-album singles
"Redmercedes"	2017	—	—	—	37	—	—	—	RIAA: Gold	Non-album singles
"Heebiejeebies" (featuring Kehlani)	2017	—	—	—	—	—	—	—	RIAA: Platinum	Good for You
"Turf"	2017	—	—	—	—	—	—	—		Good for You
"Wedding Crashers" (featuring Offset)	2017	—	—	—	—	—	—	—		Good for You
"Spice Girl"	2017	—	—	—	—	—	—	—	RIAA: Platinum	Good for You
"Campfire" (featuring Injury Reserve)	2018	—	—	—	—	—	—	—		Non-album single
"Reel It In"	2018	— (Note: "Reel It In" did not enter the Billboard Hot 100, but peaked at number five on the Bubbling Under Hot 100 chart.)	49	—	33	—	—	—	RIAA: 2× Platinum; BPI: Silver	OnePointFive
"Places + Faces"	2019	—	—	—	—	—	— (Note: "Places + Faces" did not enter the NZ Top 40 Singles Chart, but peaked at number 37 on the NZ Hot Singles Chart.)	—		Non-album single
"Shimmy"	2020	—	—	—	—	—	— (Note: "Shimmy" did not enter the NZ Top 40 Singles Chart, but peaked at number 23 on the NZ Hot Singles Chart.)	—		Limbo
"Riri"	2020	—	—	—	—	—	— (Note: "Riri" did not enter the NZ Top 40 Singles Chart, but peaked at number 20 on the NZ Hot Singles Chart.)	—		Limbo
"Compensating" (featuring Young Thug)	2020	—	—	—	—	—	— (Note: "Compensating" did not enter the NZ Top 40 Singles Chart, but peaked at number 11 on the NZ Hot Singles Chart.)	—		Limbo
"My High" (with Disclosure and Slowthai)	2020	—	—	—	—	—	— (Note: "My High" did not enter the NZ Top 40 Singles Chart, but peaked at number 15 on the NZ Hot Singles Chart.)	86		Energy
"Charmander"	2021	—	—	—	—	—	— (Note: "Charmander" did not enter the NZ Top 40 Singles Chart, but peaked at number 39 on the NZ Hot Singles Chart.)	—		TwoPointFive
"4eva" (with Kaytranada as Kaytraminé featuring Pharrell Williams)	2023	—	—	—	—	—	—	—		Kaytraminé
"Rebuke" (with Kaytranada as Kaytraminé)	2023	—	—	—	—	—	—	—		Kaytraminé
"Passenger Princess / Adam"	2024	—	—	—	—	—	—	—		.mp3s
"Familiar"	2025	—	—	—	—	—	—	—		13 Months of Sunshine
"Arc de Triomphe"	2025	—	—	—	—	—	—	—		13 Months of Sunshine
"LA"	2025	—	—	—	—	—	—	—	"—" denotes items which were not released in that country or failed to chart.	

=== As featured artist ===
List of singles as a featured artist, with selected chart positions, showing year released and album name
Title	Year	Peak chart positions	Album
Title	Year	NZ Hot	Album
"Egyptian Luvr" (Rejjie Snow featuring Aminé and Dana Williams)	2018	—	Dear Annie
"For the F^_^k of It" (Snakehips featuring Jeremih and Aminé)	2018	10	Stay Home Tapes (= --__-- =)
"Two Nights" (Lykke Li featuring Aminé)	2018	—	So Sad So Sexy
"Jailbreak the Tesla" (Injury Reserve featuring Aminé)	2019	—	Injury Reserve
"Cherries" (Hope Tala featuring Aminé)	2020	—	Girl Eats Sun
"Feel Something Different" (Bea Miller featuring Aminé)	2020	—	Feel Something Different
"Back & Forth" (Rico Nasty featuring Aminé)	2020	—	Nightmare Vacation
"Do It Right" (Rei Ami featuring Aminé)	2021	—	Do It Right
"C'mon" (Jini featuring Aminé)	2023	—	An Iron Hand in a Velvet Glove

=== Promotional singles ===
List of promotional singles, with selected details
Title	Year	Album
"Warm on a Cold Night" (Remix) (Honne featuring Aminé)	2017	Non-album singles
"Redmercedes (Remix)" (featuring Missy Elliott and AJ Tracey)	2017	Non-album singles
"Blinds"	2017	Good for You
"Squeeze"	2017	Non-album singles
"Reel It In (Remix)" (featuring Gucci Mane)	2018	Non-album singles
"Blackjack (Remix)" (featuring Cordae)	2019	Non-album singles

== Other charted songs ==
List of other charted songs, with selected chart positions
Title	Year	Peak chart positions	Album
Title	Year	NZ Hot	Album
"Woodlawn"	2020	12	Limbo
"Pressure in My Palms" (featuring Slowthai and Vince Staples)	2020	21	Limbo
"Can't Decide"	2020	32	Limbo
"Neo"	2021	33	TwoPointFive
"Who He Iz" (as Kaytraminé)	2023	23	Kaytraminé
"Letstalkaboutit" (as Kaytraminé featuring Freddie Gibbs)	2023	29	Kaytraminé
"Master P" (as Kaytraminé featuring Big Sean)	2023	33	Kaytraminé
"Sossaup" (as Kaytraminé featuring Amaarae)	2023	22	Kaytraminé

== Guest appearances ==
List of non-single guest appearances, with other performing artists, showing year released and album name
Title	Year	Other artist(s)	Album
"Thru the Tundra"	2016	Karma Kid	Man of the Year
"Vice"	2017	Jay Prince	Late Summers
"Invincible"	2018	None	Spider-Man: Into the Spider-Verse
"It's Gonna Be a Lovely Day (Secret Life of Pets 2)"	2019	LunchMoney Lewis	The Secret Life of Pets 2: Original Motion Picture Soundtrack
"Back & Forth"	2020	Rico Nasty	Nightmare Vacation
"Gametime"	2021	Lil Tecca	Space Jam: A New Legacy (Original Motion Picture Soundtrack)
"Special"	2024	Lyrical Lemonade, Swae Lee, Latto	All Is Yellow

== Music videos ==
=== As lead artist ===
List of music videos as lead artist, showing year released and directors
Title	Year	Director(s)
"Caroline"	2016	Aminé
"RedMercedes"	2017	Aminé
"Spice Girl"	2017	Aminé
"Campfire" (featuring Injury Reserve)	2018	Aminé
"Reel It In"	2018	Aminé
"Blackjack"	2019	Aminé
"Shimmy"	2020	Aminé and Jack Begert

=== As featured artist ===
List of music videos as a featured artist, showing year released and directors
Title	Year	Director(s)
"For the F^_^k of It" (Snakehips featuring Jeremih and Aminé)	2018	Can Evgin
"Jailbreak the Tesla" (Injury Reserve featuring Aminé)	2019	Parker Corey
"Cherries" (Hope Tala featuring Aminé)	2020	Anna Fearon
