= Illegal Civilization =

American skateboarding company and movie studio

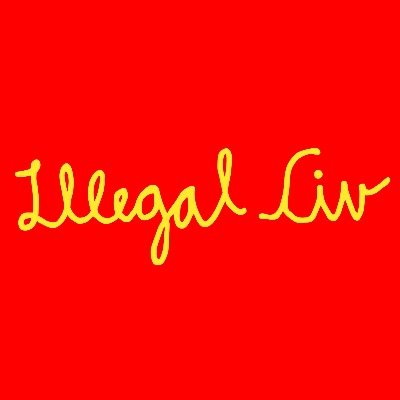
- Industry: Skateboarding, media
- Founder: Mikey Alfred
- Products: Clothing, accessories, skateboards, videos
- Website: illegalcivilization.com

Illegal Civilization, also known as IC or Illegal Civ, is an American skateboarding company and movie studio founded in North Hollywood by Mikey Alfred. The brand produces clothing, accessories, skateboards, and videos. Outside of skateboarding, Illegal Civilization previously produced music videos, documentaries, and original short films.

Illegal Civilization was affiliated with the hip-hop collective Odd Future. They filmed documentaries following the creation of Tyler, the Creator's albums Wolf and Cherry Bomb.

Founder Mikey Alfred was a co-producer on Jonah Hill's debut film Mid90s, and the film featured Illegal Civilization skate team members Sunny Suljic, Ryder McLaughlin, Olan Prenatt, Kevin White and Na-Kel Smith.

== History ==
The company was founded in 2008 by Mikey Alfred and his friends. Initially, they filmed skate videos and handed out t-shirts around North Hollywood. When Alfred was 15, skateboarder and rapper Na-Kel Smith introduced Alfred to Tyler, the Creator, and Alfred became Odd Future's personal videographer. Alfred passed out merchandise and DVDs while on tour with Tyler, the Creator and Frank Ocean, and Illegal Civilization began to gain recognition.

In 2016, the skateboard distributor Baker Boys Distribution began distributing Illegal Civilization merchandise.

In 2020, Illegal Civilization released the critically acclaimed Godspeed (2020) skate video directed by Davonte Jolly. After the release of Godspeed, IC turned Alex Midler, Kevin White, and Zach Saraceno pro.

In May 2022, Alex Midler, Kevin White, and Zach Saraceno all quit illegal Civ after not being paid for over a year.

In October 2022, Alfred gathered a group of unfamiliar and young skateboarders who were hardly known and posted a trailer to a new video he had planned titled Hell Week. News about the upcoming video was unknown to the included skateboarders due to Alfred insisting that they were only going street skateboarding and nothing more. A skateboarder named Lando Magik began to post his clips to Instagram. Shortly after, Alfred started to ridicule Magik on the company page for using the clips that he had recorded. Alfred used his equipment to make the recordings possible, so he regarded the material as private property of his own. When Magik asked Alfred to release the footage, Alfred facetiously mentioned a charge of $700 thousand for Magik to gain access to them. This caused controversy within the company and made the other skateboarders leave the group as well.

== Filmography ==
In 2017, Illegal Civilization released a short film starring Mac Miller. Later that year, they began releasing their original mini-series, Summer of '17, starring Illegal Civilization members alongside cameos from rappers Tyler, the Creator and Aminé.

=== Feature films ===
- North Hollywood (2021)

=== Short films ===
- Spark of Life (2011)
- IC1 (2012)
- Tyler the Creator's Making of Wolf Documentary (2013)
- IC2 (2014)
- Tyler the Creator's Cherry Bomb Documentary (2017)
- IC3 (2018)
- Godspeed (2020)

=== Mini-Series ===
- Summer of '17 (2017-2019) - (3 Episodes)

== Collaborations ==
- The skate team appeared in Season 4 of the HBO television series, Ballers, in 2017.
- In August 2018, Illegal Civilization released 3 pairs of shoes in collaboration with Converse.
- Illegal Civilization released a t-shirt in collaboration with Lil Wayne for the 2018 release of Tha Carter V.
- The team were featured as cast and crew members in Jonah Hill's feature film Mid90s and released a merchandise collection to promote the film with A24.
