= North Hollywood (film) =

2021 film directed by Mikey Alfred

- Theatrical release poster
- Directed by: Mikey Alfred
- Written by: Rusty Johnson
- Produced by: Mikey Alfred; Yusef Chabayta; Andrew Chennisi; Mimi Valdes; Malcolm Washington; Pharrell Williams; Samuel McIntosh; Noah Centineo
- Starring: Ryder McLaughlin; Vince Vaughn; Miranda Cosgrove
- Cinematography: Ayinde Anderson
- Edited by: Alex Tsagamilis
- Distributed by: Illegal Civilization
- Release date: March 26, 2021
- Running time: 93 minutes
- Country: United States
- Language: English

North Hollywood is a 2021 American comedy drama film directed by Mikey Alfred and written by Rusty Johnson. The film is loosely based on Alfred's life and his relationship with his father. The film stars Ryder McLaughlin, Vince Vaughn, and Miranda Cosgrove. Alfred began looking for funding to produce and direct the film in 2018, after being a co-producer on Mid90s (2018).

== Plot ==
Michael is a high school graduate living in North Hollywood, California with dreams of becoming a professional skateboarder. After being noticed by two professional skaters, Michael quits his water polo team to focus exclusively on skating. This leads to tension within Michael's relationship with his friends and his father. Michael thinks that his friends, Jay and Adolf, are not taking skating as seriously as him and he does not want to waste time with them. For this reason he starts to skate with them less and more with the professional skaters, which adds to the tension in their relationships. His father does not see skating as a realistic career and wants him to go to college and pursue stable employment. Michael is ultimately faced with the decision between choosing the future his father wants, or following his dream of becoming a professional skater.

== Cast ==
- Ryder McLaughlin as Michael
- Vince Vaughn as Oliver
- Miranda Cosgrove as Rachel
- Nico Hiraga as Jay
- Aramis Hudson as Adolf
- Angus Cloud as Walker
- Tyshawn Jones as Isiah Jordan
- Bob Worrest as Nolan Knox
- Sparkle Tatyana-Marie as Rachel's friend
- Blake Anderson as School Security Guard
- Gillian Jacobs as Abigaile
- Sunny Suljic as Clark
- Thomas Barbusca as Altar Boy
- Griffin Gluck as Drew
- Nate Hinds as Rubo

=== Cameos ===
There are several cameos in North Hollywood, ranging from popular skaters, actors, musicians, and entrepreneurs.

- Andrew Reynolds, founder of Baker Skateboards and professional skater is seen at the table scene
- Louie Lopez, professional skater for Converse, Independent trucks, Hardies Hardware, and Mob Grip is seen at the table scene
- Kader Sylla, skater sponsored by Baker Skateboards is seen as a ticketer in the film
- Davonte Jolly, skate filmer, is seen filming in the movie
- Sunny Suljic, actor, musician and skateboarder also former member for Illegal Civ is seen twice in the movie, appear as character named Clark
- Na-Kel Smith, actor, musician, and professional skater for Fucking Awesome and Supreme is seen multiple times in the film
- Zach Saraceno, a professional skater for Illegal Civ is seen in the film
- Kevin White, professional skater for Illegal Civ, and sponsored by Hardies Hardware is seen in the film
- Jason Dill, professional skater and co-founder of Fucking Awesome is shown as Father Mahoney in the film
- The Garden, popular band from Orange County, California.

== Release ==
The film had its world premiere starting on March 26, 2021, at the SoFi Stadium in Inglewood, California. It was the first public event for the Sofi Stadium. Due to the pandemic, it was a drive-in style. The premiere was hosted for three nights in a row.

== Reception ==
On the review aggregator website Rotten Tomatoes, 78% of 18 critics' reviews are positive, with an average rating of 6/10.
