= Nico Hiraga =

American actor (born 1997)

- Nico Hiraga in 2026
- Born: December 19, 1997 (age 28); San Francisco, California, U.S.
- Occupation: Actor
- Years active: 2017–present

Nico Hiraga (born December 19, 1997) is an American actor. He is known for playing Seth in the 2021 film Moxie and Tanner in the 2019 film Booksmart. Hiraga's roles also include Ballers, North Hollywood and Sweethearts. Hiraga appeared in the Amazon series The Power and the 2022 film Hello, Goodbye, and Everything In Between.

== Life and career ==
Hiraga was born on December 19, 1997, in San Francisco, California. He is half-Japanese. He has a brother.

Hiraga took up skateboarding around the age of 10 or 11 and became sponsored at 14 years old. He wanted to become a professional skateboarder but a serious ankle injury when he was 19 ended those dreams. Hiraga hired a manager and booked a small role in Crystal Moselle's Skate Kitchen. He continued skating after his injury recovered and is a member of the Illegal Civilization skate crew. He appeared the Illegal Civilization short film Summer of 17.

Hiraga has appeared in the films Booksmart and Rosaline. The same year in 2021, he played the role in two comedy-drama films: Jay in the first Illegal Civilization feature film North Hollywood and Seth Acosta in Moxie, directed by Amy Poehler. Hiraga played the role of Scotty in the 2022 romantic drama film Hello, Goodbye, and Everything in Between. In 2023, Hiraga was cast to play the main role of Ryan in the British sci-fi drama series The Power, based on Naomi Alderman's 2016 novel of the same name, which was premiered on 31 March 2023.

Hiraga played his first lead role in the 2024 Max film Sweethearts. In October 2025, Hiraga joined the cast of the coming-of-age film The Julia Set.

== Filmography ==
=== Films ===
Year	Film	Role	Notes
2017	Summer of 17	Nico	Short
2018	Skate Kitchen	Patrick	
2019	Booksmart	Tanner	
2021	Moxie	Seth Acosta / "The Shrimp"	
2021	North Hollywood	Jay	
2022	Hello, Goodbye, and Everything in Between	Scotty	
2022	Rosaline	Steve the Courier	
2023	Love in Taipei	Xavier Yeh	
2024	Goodrich	Jonny	
2024	Sweethearts	Ben	
2025	For Worse	Sean	
2026	The Devil's Mouth	James	
TBA	The Julia Set		Post-production

=== Television ===
Year	Title	Role	Notes
2018	Ballers	Nico Hiraga	3 episodes
2023	The Power	Ryan	Main role
2024	A Nonsense Christmas with Sabrina Carpenter	Ebby Scrooge	Television special

=== Music videos ===
Year	Title	Artist
2018	"My Life"	Zhu and Tame Impala
2021	"Brutal"	Olivia Rodrigo

=== Skate videos ===
Year	Title
2017	"The Flare"
2020	"Godspeed"
