= Kevin White (skateboarder) =

American skateboarder (born 1993)

- Born: Kevin Ivory White; September 27, 1993 (age 32); Inglewood, California, U.S.
- Other name: Jumpman Blanco
- Height: 6 ft 4 in (193 cm)
- Website: jumpmanblanco.com

Kevin Ivory White (born September 27, 1993), known as Jumpman Blanco, is an American professional skateboarder, model, and actor.

== Early life ==
Kevin White was born September 27, 1993, in Inglewood, California. White started skating when he was five years old. While growing up, White credits his late mother for being his biggest supporter.

== Career ==
White was introduced by Na-Kel Smith to Mikey Alfred, founder of the skate crew and creative collective, Illegal Civilization. White was featured in the mini-series Summer of 17, starring Illegal Civilization members alongside cameos from rappers Tyler the Creator and Aminé.

In 2018 White and the Illegal Civilization team were featured as cast and crew members in Jonah Hill's feature film Mid90s and released a merchandise collection to promote the film with A24.

In 2020, White was featured on Thrasher Magazine cover The Heroes & Heavies Of Black Skateboarding, depicting all-time great black skaters both past and present. After his performance in the critically acclaimed Godspeed (2020) skate video, Illegal Civilization turned White pro giving him his first pro board. Davonte Jolly tapped White for the first part in Godspeed. White learned he'd have the opening part a couple days before the premiere.

== Filmography ==
Year	Title	Role	Notes	Produced by
2012	IC1	Self	Skate Video	Mikey Alfred, Illegal Civilization
2014	IC2	Self	Skate Video	Mikey Alfred, Illegal Civilization
2017	Summer of 17, Episode 1	Self	Mini-Series	The FADER
2018	Mid90s	ProSkater#2	Feature Film	Scott Rudin, Eli Bush, Ken Kao Jonah Hill Lila Yacoub
2020	Godspeed	Self	Skate Video	Davonte Jolly, Illegal Civilization
2020	May1918	Self	Skate Video	Illegal Civilization, Tanner Rowe
2020	North Hollywood	Himself	Film	Mikey Alfred Yusef Chabayta Malcolm Washington Pharrell Williams
