= Jennifer E. Smith (author) =

American young adult author

Jennifer Elizabeth Smith (born 1980) is an American author of young adult novels, including bestsellers: The Statistical Probability of Love at First Sight, Windfall, and Field Notes on Love.

== Biography ==
Smith was born in Lake Forest, Illinois. She graduated from Colgate University in 2003 with an English degree, and she also holds a master's degree in creative writing from the University of St. Andrews in Scotland. She began working for a literary agent in New York City. Her first novel, The Comeback Season, was published by Simon & Schuster in 2008. Both this book and Smith's second book, You are Here, sold poorly. However, she encountered her first commercial success with The Statistical Probability of Love at First Sight (published in 2012), written after having taken a break from writing. Smith continued to work as an editor at Random House while also working on her own writing until 2015. Currently, her work has been translated into 33 languages. As of 2022, Smith has published 11 novels, including nine young adult novels, one adult novel, and one novel aimed at middle graders.

Her first picture book, The Creature of Habit, illustrated by Leo Espinosa, was released in 2021. Her first novel for adults, The Unsinkable Greta James, was released in 2022.

== Film adaptations ==
The first film adaptation of one of Smith's novels to be released was the 2022 Netflix film Hello, Goodbye, and Everything in Between, based on the 2015 novel of the same name. It was directed by Michael Lewen, starring Jordan Fisher as Aidan and Talia Ryder as Clare. It was the first film that Jordan Fisher produced. The film was released to a mixed reception from both critics and general audiences.

When it was published in 2011, The Statistical Probability of Love at First Sight became her first commercial success, being optioned as a film (with Dustin Lance Black assigned as the director, but later replaced by Vanessa Caswill). As of 2021, the movie adaptation of The Statistical Probability of Love at First Sight was in production in London. Starring Haley Lu Richardson as Hadley and Ben Hardy as Oliver, the film was released on Netflix on September 15, 2023.

Her 2017 novel Windfall has also been optioned as a movie, with Lauren Graham intending to produce the adaptation.

In 2019 it was announced that producers Roger Lay Jr. and Eric Carnagey have acquired rights to the novels This is What Happy Looks Like and The Geography of You and Me.

== Bibliography ==
- The Comeback Season (Simon & Schuster, 2008)
- You are Here (Simon & Schuster, 2009)
- The Statistical Probability of Love at First Sight (Poppy/Little, Brown & Company, 2011)
- The Storm Makers (Little, Brown Books for Young Readers, 2013)
- This Is What Happy Looks Like (Little, Brown Books for Young Readers, 2013)
- The Geography of You and Me (Poppy/Little, Brown, 2014)
- Happy Again (Poppy, 2015)
- Hello, Goodbye, and Everything in Between (Poppy/Little, Brown, 2015)
- Windfall (Delacorte Press, 2017)
- Field Notes on Love (Delacorte Press, 2019)
- The Creature of Habit (Random House Studio, 2021)
- The Unsinkable Greta James (Ballantine Books, 2022)
- Fun for the Whole Family (Ballantine Books, 2025)
