= Reel It In =

2018 single by Aminé

- Cover art of the official remix

Single by Aminé

from the album OnePointFive
- Released: September 25, 2018
- Length: 2:01
- Label: CLBN; Republic
- Songwriter(s): Adam Daniel; Terry Watson; Lawrence Greenidge
- Producer(s): Tee-Watt; LDG Beats

Aminé singles chronology
"Two Nights" (2018)	"Reel It In" (2018)	"Jailbreak the Tesla" (2019)

Music video
- "Reel It In" on YouTube

"Reel It In" (stylized in all caps) is a song by American rapper Aminé. It was sent to U.S. rhythmic contemporary radio on September 25, 2018 as the lead single from his third mixtape OnePointFive (2018). The song was produced by Tee-Watt and LDG Beats.

== Composition ==
The song contains a guitar loop and flute.

== Critical reception ==
Jake Indiana of Highsnobiety gave a negative review of the song, writing that the production has "elements that are good in theory but make for a product that is much less than the sum of its parts. That Aminé, one of the most offbeat lyricists in the business, would drop the downright reductive couplet 'She Björk cute, so she really fine, just sorta weird,' isn't doing this cut any favors."

== Music video ==
An official music video was released on September 5, 2018. Directed by Jack Begert and Sam Canter, it sees Aminé running a car wash on a sunny day. The video opens with the manager, Ricky, telling a customer he will leave briefly to attend to some self-care needs. After that, Aminé begins partying at the car wash with a group of women in bikinis, who wash some candy-painted old school cars and shake their buttocks. When Ricky returns, he berates the women, but after Aminé explains he is shooting a music video his attitude changes and he joins Aminé, his friends and the women in dancing.

== Remix ==
An official remix of the song featuring American rapper Gucci Mane was released on November 20, 2018.

== Charts ==
Chart performance for "Reel It In"
Chart (2018)	Peak position
US Bubbling Under Hot 100 Singles (Billboard)	5
US Hot R&B/Hip-Hop Songs (Billboard)	49
US Rhythmic (Billboard)	33

== Certifications ==
Certifications for "Reel It In"
Region	Certification	Certified units/sales
Brazil (Pro-Música Brasil)	Platinum	40,000^{‡}
New Zealand (RMNZ)	2× Platinum	60,000^{‡}
Portugal (AFP)	Gold	5,000^{‡}
United Kingdom (BPI)	Silver	200,000^{‡}
United States (RIAA)	2× Platinum	2,000,000^{‡}
^{‡} Sales+streaming figures based on certification alone.
