= Limbo (Aminé album) =

Studio album by Aminé
- Released: August 7, 2020
- Genre: Hip-hop
- Length: 44:05
- Labels: CLBN; Republic
- Producers: Aaron Childs; Ambezza; Aminé; Boi-1da; Byrd; Finesse; Greg Sekeres; James Maddocks; Mac Wetha; Maneesh; Nik D; Oz; Parker Corey; P2J; Pasqué; Pi'erre Bourne; T-Minus; Taycreations; Vinylz; Yung Lan

Aminé chronology
OnePointFive (2018)	Limbo (2020)	TwoPointFive (2021)

Singles from Limbo
- 1. "Shimmy" Released: February 26, 2020; 2. "Riri" Released: May 29, 2020; 3. "Compensating" Released: July 6, 2020

Limbo is the second studio album by American rapper Aminé. It was released on August 7, 2020, by CLBN and Republic Records. The album features guest appearances from JID, Charlie Wilson, Young Thug, Slowthai, Vince Staples, Summer Walker, and Injury Reserve.

Prior to release, Limbo was promoted by three singles: "Shimmy", "Riri", and "Compensating". The album debuted at number 16 on the US Billboard 200 chart, earning 26,000 album-equivalent units in its first week.

== Promotion ==
The album's lead single, "Shimmy", was released alongside its music video on February 26, 2020. The video depicts Aminé performing the song at various locales in his hometown of Portland, Oregon. "Riri" was released on May 29, 2020, and its music video was released June 24, 2020, after being delayed so Aminé could participate in Black Lives Matter marches in protest against the murder of George Floyd and shooting of Breonna Taylor. "Compensating" featuring Young Thug, was released on July 6, 2020, as the album's third single.

== Critical reception ==
Professional ratings
Aggregate scores
Source	Rating
AnyDecentMusic?	6.7/10
Metacritic	75/100
Review scores
Source	Rating
AllMusic	4/5 stars
Clash	6/10
Crack Magazine	7/10
Entertainment Weekly	C+
Paste	8.4/10
Pitchfork	7.5/10
RapReviews	7.5/10
Slant Magazine	3.5/5 stars

Limbo was met with generally positive reviews. At Metacritic, which assigns a normalized rating out of 100 to reviews from mainstream publications, the album received an average score of 75, based on seven reviews. Aggregator AnyDecentMusic? gave it 6.7 out of 10, based on their assessment of the critical consensus.

Sheldon Pearce of Pitchfork highlighted Aminé's shift in style from his previous album, stating "he's more pragmatic, suddenly concerned with crafting a sustainable legacy, and this new attitude produces the best music of his career". Writing for Slant Magazine, Charles Lyons-Burt praised Aminé's performance and wrote "In melding traditional hip-hop form with just the right amount of modern trap verve, Limbo makes the case for Aminé, if not as the next great rapper, then as a pop-rap workhorse. The album proves that he can keep pace with his contemporaries while drawing on the history of the genre in ways many of today's innovators are unconcerned with engaging". Candace McDuffie of Paste said, "Although this light-hearted nature dominated Good for You in its entirety, Limbo takes more of an existential turn as Aminé earnestly wonders what comes after that initial rush of success". Nicolas-Tyrell Scott from Crack Magazine enjoyed the album, saying, "Limbo feels like the emergence of a new artist: one whose growth has taught him exactly how to use his voice". Steve "Flash" Juon of RapReviews said, "Limbo shows that if he takes his time and works with the right people, the results can be drastically improved. The hidden talent Amine had is hidden no more, and I'm happy to say I won't be nearly so reluctant to listen to his NEXT album".

The album also received some mixed reviews. Mike Milenko of Clash described the album as "an example of a talented artist not pushing his boundaries". Writing for Entertainment Weekly, Eli Enis praised the first six tracks before noting "the record falls off during its latter half as the melodic R&B cuts begin to blend together".

=== Year-end lists ===
Select year-end rankings of Limbo
Publication	List	Rank	Ref.
Complex	The Best Albums of 2020	37	
Insider	The 20 Best Albums of 2020	18	
PopSugar	Best Albums of 2020	12	
Uproxx	The Best Albums of 2020	27	

== Commercial performance ==
Limbo debuted at number 16 on the US Billboard 200 chart, earning 26,000 album-equivalent units in its first week. The album also debuted at number 10 on the US Top R&B/Hip-Hop Albums chart, becoming Amine's first top-ten album on this chart.

== Track listing ==
Limbo track listing
No.	Title	Writer(s)	Producer(s)	Length
1.	"Burden"	Adam Daniel; Albert Tanner; Lloyd McDonald; Madison Stewart; William Pulliam	Mac Wetha	3:31
2.	"Woodlawn"	Daniel; Greg Sekeres; James Maddocks; Milan Modi	Yung Lan; Sekeres; Maddocks	2:23
3.	"Kobe"	Daniel; Irvin Mejia	Pasqué	0:39
4.	"Roots" (featuring JID and Charlie Wilson)	Daniel; Charlie Brown; Destin Route; George Smallwood; Mejia; Nathaniel Ritchie; Parker Corey	Corey; Pasqué	4:28
5.	"Can't Decide"	Daniel; Tyler Williams; Stewart	T-Minus	2:53
6.	"Compensating" (featuring Young Thug)	Daniel; T. Williams; Mejia; Jeffery Williams	T-Minus	3:18
7.	"Shimmy"	Daniel; Anderson Hernandez; Mejia; Matthew Samuels; Nik Frascona; Oz; Robert Diggs; Rook Monroe; Russell Jones	Boi-1da; Vinylz; Oz; Nik D; Rook^{[a]}; Pasqué^{[a]}	2:14
8.	"Pressure in My Palms" (featuring Slowthai and Vince Staples)	Daniel; Mejia; Brenda Mensah; Tyron Frampton; Vince Staples	Pasqué	3:58
9.	"Riri"	Daniel; Mejia	Pasqué	3:02
10.	"Easy" (featuring Summer Walker)	Daniel; Aaron Childs; Jackuum; Marlon Roudette; Richard Oluwaranti; Summer Walker	P2J; Childs	3:31
11.	"Mama"	Daniel; Mejia; Stewart; Odunayo Ekunbojeyo; Phil Hotz	Pasqué	3:39
12.	"Becky"	Daniel; Brown; Mejia; Stewart	Aminé; Pasqué	3:41
13.	"Fetus" (featuring Injury Reserve)	Daniel; Ari Balouzian; Juliana Rowlands; Ritchie; Corey; Jordan Groggs	Corey	3:52
14.	"My Reality"	Daniel; Hernandez; Mejia; Daniel Caesar; Jahaan Sweet; Stewart; Maneesh; Samuels	Maneesh; Boi-1da; Vinylz; Sweet^{[a]}	3:09
Total length:				44:05

Deluxe edition (bonus tracks)
No.	Title	Writer(s)	Producer(s)	Length
15.	"Mrs. Clean"	Daniel; Jordan Jenkins	Pi'erre Bourne	2:08
16.	"Zack & Cody" (featuring Valee)	Daniel; Taylor Winfield; Valee	Taycreations	2:08
17.	"Gelato"	Daniel; Amritivir Singh; Leutrim Bequiri	Ambezza; Byrd; Finesse	2:09
18.	"Talk" (featuring Saba)	Daniel; Diego; Mejia; Nami; Saba	Pasqué	2:13
19.	"Chicken" (featuring Toosii)	Daniel; Mejia; Naujour Grainger	Pasqué	2:25
20.	"Buzzin" (featuring Unknown Mortal Orchestra)	Daniel; Mejia; Davon Jamison; Nami; Unknown Mortal Orchestra	Pasqué	3:40
21.	"Solid"	Daniel; Mejia; Brown	Pasqué	2:40
Total length:				61:28

Notes

- ^{^[a]} signifies an additional producer

Sample credits

- "Burden" contains samples of "Thank You God", written by William Pulliam and Albert Tanner, as performed by Darondo.
- "Roots" contains samples of "I Love My Father", written and performed by George Smallwood.
- "Shimmy" contains samples from "Shimmy Shimmy Ya", written by Robert Diggs and Russell Jones, as performed by Ol' Dirty Bastard.
- "Fetus" contains samples of "So Young", written by Ari Balouzian and Juliana Rowlands, as performed by Midnight Sister.

== Personnel ==
Credits adapted from Tidal.

Performance

- Aminé – vocals
- Jak Knight – additional vocals (8, 10, 15, 18)
- Bree Runway – additional vocals (15)
- Joyce Wrice – additional vocals (15, 16, 20)
- Marche' Black – additional vocals (16)
- Charlie Wilson – additional vocals (18)
- Odie – additional vocals (18)
- Daniel Caesar – additional vocals (21)
- Marche Black – background vocals (7)
- Merna – background vocals (8)
- Sing Harlem – background vocals (8, 18, 20, 21)

Musicians

- Morning Estrada – programming (11)
- Sean Phelan – strings (11, 14)
- Pasqué – programming (13)

Technical

- David Nakaji – mixing (1, 3, 8–21)
- Morning Estrada – recording, mixing (2, 4–7)
- Phil Holtz – recording (8, 11–14, 21)
- Sean Phelan – recording (12)
- A. "Bainz" Bains – recording (13)
- P2J – recording (17)
- Summer Walker – recording (17)
- Irving Gadoury – recording (18)
- John Bruington – mixing assistance (8–12, 14, 15, 17, 18, 20, 21)
- Brodie Means – recording assistance (2, 4, 6–8, 11, 15, 16)
- Milan Beker – recording assistance (1, 5, 8, 11–14, 16, 18, 19)
- Jaramiah Rios – recording assistance (17)
- Jason Patterson – recording assistance (17)

== Charts ==
Chart performance for Limbo
Chart (2020)	Peak position
Australian Albums (ARIA)	56
Belgian Albums (Ultratop Flanders)	83
Canadian Albums (Billboard)	28
Irish Albums (Official Charts)	45
New Zealand Albums (RMNZ)	24
Swiss Albums (Schweizer Hitparade)	72
UK Albums (Official Charts)	70
US Billboard 200	16
US Top R&B/Hip-Hop Albums (Billboard)	10

== Release history ==
Release dates and formats for Limbo
Region	Date	Label(s)	Format(s)	Edition	Ref.
Various	August 7, 2020	CLBN; Republic	Digital download; streaming	Standard	
Various	November 6, 2020	CLBN; Republic	CD	Standard	
Various	December 4, 2020	CLBN; Republic	Digital download; streaming	Deluxe	
