= Love at First Sight (2023 film) =

American film by Vanessa Caswill

- Promotional release poster
- Directed by: Vanessa Caswill
- Screenplay by: Katie Lovejoy
- Based on: The Statistical Probability of Love at First Sight by Jennifer E. Smith
- Produced by: Matt Kaplan
- Starring: Haley Lu Richardson; Ben Hardy; Jameela Jamil; Rob Delaney; Sally Phillips; Dexter Fletcher
- Cinematography: Luke Bryant
- Edited by: Michelle Harrison; Joe Klotz
- Music by: Paul Saunderson
- Production company: ACE Entertainment
- Distributed by: Netflix
- Release date: September 15, 2023
- Running time: 91 minutes
- Country: United States
- Language: English

Love at First Sight is a 2023 American romantic comedy film directed by Vanessa Caswill and written by Katie Lovejoy, based upon the 2011 novel The Statistical Probability of Love at First Sight by Jennifer E. Smith. It stars Haley Lu Richardson, Ben Hardy, Dexter Fletcher, Rob Delaney, Sally Phillips and Jameela Jamil.

The film premiered on Netflix on September 15, 2023, and received mixed reviews from critics.

== Plot ==
On December 20th at JFK Airport, the narrator introduces 20-year old Hadley Sullivan. An American student who is often late with an undercharged phone, Hadley just misses her flight to London and is rebooked on the next.

At a charging station, Hadley meets British 22-year old Yale student Oliver Jones, who lends her his charger. They hit it off and agree to have dinner together at the food court. Hadley explains she is flying to London for her dad Andrew's second wedding and is ambivalent about his decision to remarry only a few months after divorcing her mother. Oliver reveals he is studying statistical inference and conducting an unspecified research project. As he is carrying a garment bag, Hadley assumes he is also going to a wedding, which he does not contest.

After boarding, Hadley and Oliver part, but he discovers his seat belt is broken, so is moved to the seat next to Hadley. They spend the flight falling in love.

After landing, Oliver puts his mobile number into Hadley's so she can contact him, but it dies and she loses the number. With no way to find him, Hadley goes to the wedding, arriving right before it is due to start. Although struggling with her father's decision to remarry, Hadley is charmed by his fiancée Charlotte's kindness and consideration.

After the ceremony, Hadley overhears family friends telling Charlotte they will be leaving early to attend a memorial service. After hearing some of the details, Hadley quickly realizes Oliver has actually come to London to attend his mother’s memorial, not a wedding. She spontaneously decides to go to it, as the wedding reception does not start for four hours.

Meanwhile, Oliver's brother Luther collects him at the airport to head to the Shakespeare-themed memorial. There, he reunites with his father Val, and his still-living mother Tessa, who has terminal lung cancer and wants to attend her own memorial. Oliver tells her he is unhappy she refuses to undergo treatment, but Tessa emphasises that even with treatment she would still die, so would rather do so feeling like herself.

Hadley finds the memorial service, where she meets Oliver's family. After overcoming her initial confusion over Tessa still being alive, she finds Oliver. He is very happy to see Hadley, and tries to downplay his feelings about his mother's impending death. When she presses him to be honest and not use statistics to rationalise the situation, Oliver blurts out his anguish, so Hadley leaves.

Afterwards, Oliver delivers Tessa's eulogy. In it, he confesses that he has attempted to measure his life in numbers to help make sense of it. However, he cannot reduce his mother’s presence and meaning to simple statistics.

Hadley, meanwhile, realises she forgot her backpack at the memorial. So, she attempts to return to the wedding reception on foot, but gets lost. Hadley borrows a phone to call her dad, who collects her with Charlotte.

Andrew commends Hadley for taking a chance and going to see Oliver, and provides her with closure over her feelings about his divorce from her mother. He and Charlotte both apologise that their excitement to involve her in their wedding unintentionally put pressure on her. Father and daughter reconcile and they all go to the reception together.

Following the memorial, Oliver's family teases him about Hadley, but Oliver insists it is futile to pursue her, as the odds of their relationship working out are low. Having found Hadley's backpack, they find Andrew's wedding invitation inside so encourage Oliver to go see her. Val tells him that even if he had known that Tessa would eventually die of cancer, he would not have done anything differently, and the family sets out to find Hadley.

Oliver tracks Hadley down at the reception and admits his three greatest fears: germs, the dark, and surprises, due to his mother's cancer diagnosis. She then kisses him. When Hadley asks Oliver what he is researching, he reveals it is the statistical probability of love at first sight.

The narrator then reveals that Hadley and Oliver will stay together for the rest of their lives, be married for 58 years, and have a daughter.

== Cast ==
- Haley Lu Richardson as Hadley Sullivan
- Ben Hardy as Oliver Jones
- Rob Delaney as Andrew Sullivan
- Katrina Nare as Charlotte
- Jameela Jamil as the narrator
- Tom Taylor as Luther Jones
- Dexter Fletcher as Val Jones
- Sally Phillips as Tessa Jones

== Production ==
In November 2020, Haley Lu Richardson joined the cast of the film, with Vanessa Caswill directing from a screenplay by Katie Lovejoy, based upon the 2011 novel The Statistical Probability of Love at First Sight by Jennifer E. Smith, with Richardson also set to serve as an executive producer. In January 2021, Ben Hardy, Dexter Fletcher, Rob Delaney, Sally Phillips and Jameela Jamil joined the cast of the film, with principal photography beginning that same month.

== Release ==
In April 2022, Netflix bought worldwide rights to the film. Love at First Sight premiered on Netflix on September 15, 2023.

== Reception ==
On the review aggregator website Rotten Tomatoes, 76% of 49 critics' reviews are positive, with an average rating of 6.3/10. The website's consensus reads: "Love at First Sight gets a lot of mileage out of its quirky narrative gimmick and the chemistry of its appealing leads; although it's undermined somewhat by a lackluster script, this is still an above-average rom-com overall." On Metacritic, the film has a weighted average score of 55 out of 100 based on reviews from 11 critics, indicating "mixed or average".

== See also ==
- Love at first sight
