= Boy (2025 film) =

2025 film by Lee Sang-deok

- Theatrical release poster
- Hangul: 보이
- RR: Boi
- MR: Poi
- Directed by: Lee Sang-deok
- Written by: Lee Sang-deok
- Produced by: Park Hyeon-seok
- Starring: Jo Byeong-kyu; Yoo In-soo; Jini; Seo In-guk
- Cinematography: Cho Young-chan
- Edited by: Kim Zoon-hyoung
- Music by: B.I
- Production company: Albatross Film
- Distributed by: Special Movie City
- Release dates: November 16, 2025 (Fancine); January 14, 2026 (South Korea)
- Running time: 90 minutes
- Country: South Korea
- Language: Korean

Boy (Korean: 보이) is a 2025 South Korean romantic crime drama film directed and written by Lee Sang-deok, and starring Jo Byeong-kyu, Yoo In-soo, Jini, and Seo In-guk. It follows marginalized individuals living in a fictional city whose rigid social order is disrupted by an unexpected romance. The film held its world premiere at the 35th Fancine Film Festival on November 16, 2025, and released theatrically in South Korea on January 14, 2026.

== Premise ==
In the fictional, crime-ridden city of Pogu, a facility known as "Texas Hot Springs" serves as a central hub for those abandoned by society. The facility is overseen by the "Big Boss" Gyohan and his younger brother Rohan, while the "Mad Hatter" exerts absolute influence over the city's underworld. The arrival of a new resident named Jane triggers a series of events where a single instance of love acts as a destabilizing force, leading to a cycle of violence, betrayal, and attempted escape.

== Cast ==
- Jo Byeong-kyu as Rohan
- Yoo In-soo as Gyohan
- Jini as Jane
- Seo In-guk as Mad Hatter

== Production ==
In November 2024, production company Albatross Films announced that principal photography for Boy had concluded. Directed by Lee Sang-deok, the project is a romantic crime drama set in the fictional city of Pogu. The narrative centers on the residents of Texas Hot Springs, a facility managed by a local figure known as the Mad Hatter. The cast includes Jo Byeong-kyu, Seo In-guk, Yoo In-soo, and Jini in her big screen debut. Following the wrap of filming, Director Lee stated that the production would move into a post-production phase to balance the film's themes of youth and crime. The film was scheduled for release in the first half of 2025.

The film marks the debut of B.I as a music director. He produced several tracks for the film, including title of the same name, utilizing rhythmic beats intended to match the film's visual tempo. The film's ending theme, "I'll Get Drunk Tonight" (오늘밤은 취해볼게요), is performed by singer Zo Zazz.

== Release ==
Boy was officially invited to the 35th Fancine Film Festival in Spain, on November 16, 2025. Director Lee, Cinematographer Cho Young-chan, and Jo attended the event. Following its festival run, distributor Movie Special City SMC confirmed the South Korean theatrical release for January 14, 2026.
