= The Julia Set =

2026 film by Niki Byrne

- Directed by: Niki Byrne
- Screenplay by: Niki Byrne
- Produced by: Jeffrey Penman; Nick Scherma; Shaun Sanghani; Gillian Anderson; Eleonora Granata-Jenkinson; Andrey Epifanov; David Treatman; Max Johnson; Lee Stollman; Ellen Goldsmith-Vein; Tayler Haynes
- Starring: Chase Infiniti; Gillian Anderson; Christopher Briney; Jason Isaacs; Nina Hoss; Chloe Bailey; Carmen Ejogo; Nico Hiraga; Liz Lin; Alex Dillard; Fabrizio Matteini
- Cinematography: Antonio Calvache
- Edited by: James LeSage
- Production companies: Potato Salad Cosmic Domination; SSS Entertainment; G Nus Media; IF/THEN; Grapevine Films; Cinetrain, SA; Melograno Films; HanWay Films; Gotham Group; Good Future Films; Vacancy Film Fund
- Distributed by: Sony Pictures Classics
- Release date: September 11, 2026 (TIFF)
- Running time: 112 minutes
- Country: United States
- Language: English

The Julia Set (sometimes stylized as Th= {Julia Set}) is a 2026 American coming-of-age drama film written and directed by Niki Byrne, starring Chase Infiniti, Gillian Anderson, Christopher Briney, Jason Isaacs, Nina Hoss, Chloe Bailey, Carmen Ejogo, Nico Hiraga, Liz Lin and Alex Dillard.

== Premise ==
A young mathematician prepares for a challenging contest.

== Cast ==
- Chase Infiniti as Julia
- Christopher Briney as Pascal
- Gillian Anderson
- Jason Isaacs
- Nina Hoss
- Chloe Bailey as Erin
- Carmen Ejogo
- Nico Hiraga as Marcus
- Liz Lin
- Alex Dillard

== Production ==
The film is written and directed by Niki Byrne. Producers include Jeffrey Penman (p.g.a.), Nick Scherma (p.g.a.), Shaun Sanghani, Gillian Anderson, Eleonora Granata-Jenkinson, Andrey Epifanov, David Treatman, Max Johnson, Lee Stollman, Ellen Goldsmith-Vein and Tayler Haynes. It is produced by Potato Salad Cosmic Domination, in association with SSS Entertainment, G Nus Media, IF/THEN, Grapevine Films, Cinetrain, SA, Melograno Films, Hanway Films, Gotham Group, Good Future and Vacancy Film Fund.

The cast is led by Chase Infiniti, Gillian Anderson, Christopher Briney, Jason Isaacs, Nina Hoss, Chloe Bailey, Carmen Ejogo, Nico Hiraga, Liz Lin and Alex Dillard.

Principal photography was underway in London in October 2025.

== Release ==
The Julia Set premiered at the Toronto International Film Festival in September 2026. In October 2026, Sony Pictures Classics acquired distribution rights to the film in the United States, United Kingdom, Australia, New Zealand, South Africa, Italy, Spain, Scandinavia, the Benelux, Switzerland, Israel, Eastern Europe excluding Poland, and Asia excluding Singapore.
