= Chase Infiniti =

American actress (born 2000)

- Infiniti in 2026
- Born: Chase Infiniti Payne; May 1, 2000 (age 26); Indianapolis, Indiana, U.S.
- Education: Columbia College Chicago
- Occupation: Actress
- Years active: 2023–present

Chase Infiniti Payne (born May 1, 2000) is an American actress. Her accolades include a National Board of Review Award, in addition to nominations for two BAFTAs, a Golden Globe and a Primetime Emmy Award.

Infiniti first gained recognition for her performances in the legal thriller series Presumed Innocent (2024) and Paul Thomas Anderson's One Battle After Another (2025). The latter, which was her first leading role, brought Infiniti to greater attention, garnering her nominations for the BAFTA and Golden Globe for Best Actress. She earned continued praise for her leading role in the dystopian drama series The Testaments (2026–present), for which she earned a nomination for the Primetime Emmy Award for Outstanding Lead Actress in a Drama Series.

== Early life ==
Infiniti was born in Indianapolis, Indiana, on May 1, 2000. She was named after the Batman Forever (1995) character Chase Meridian, played by Nicole Kidman, and Buzz Lightyear's catchphrase "To infinity and beyond" from Toy Story (1995), and she uses her middle name professionally. Her father, Keith, owns a construction company and her mother, Kim, is a homemaker; her father is African-American and her mother is white. She has a younger sister, Dolcé.

Infiniti attended the International School of Indiana, a language immersion private school in Indianapolis where she studied French. Infiniti first auditioned for a school musical at age 10. She later transferred to North Central High School where she was extensively involved in music and theatre program. She graduated in 2018. She then attended Columbia College Chicago, graduating in 2022. While in Chicago, she worked as a kickboxing trainer and co-founded the K-pop cover dance group Duple Dance Crew.

== Career ==
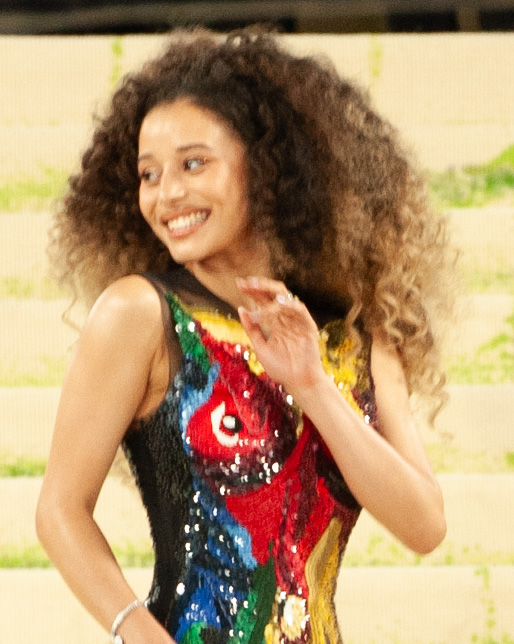
Infiniti at the 2026 Met Gala

In February 2023, Infiniti was announced as part of the cast in the Apple TV+ limited series Presumed Innocent. In February 2024, she joined the cast for Paul Thomas Anderson's film One Battle After Another, playing the daughter of a former revolutionary (Leonardo DiCaprio). Infiniti submitted a self-tape for the film while filming Presumed Innocent. During her callback, she participated in a karate class with Anderson observing; though she was the only beginner, he cast her immediately after the session. Her appearance in the film's trailer led Tyler, the Creator to cast her in his music video for "Darling, I". For One Battle After Another, Infiniti won the National Board of Review Award for Breakthrough Performance and received Best Actress nominations from the AACTA, Actor, BAFTA, Critics' Choice, Golden Globe Awards, but was ultimately snubbed of an Oscar nomination. She also received nominations for the BAFTA Rising Star Award and, alongside the film's ensemble cast, the Actor Award for Outstanding Performance by a Cast in a Motion Picture.

Infiniti is currently starring in the MGM production The Testaments, a sequel series to Hulu's The Handmaid's Tale. Showrunner Bruce Miller cast her after seeing her performance in Presumed Innocent and her K-pop dance covers, citing her versatility. The series premiered in April to critical acclaim, with Infiniti's performance earning her a Gotham TV Award and nomination for the Primetime Emmy Award for Outstanding Lead Actress in a Drama Series.

In October 2025, Infiniti joined the cast of the coming-of-age drama The Julia Set.

On June 26, 2026, she starred in the music video for "Bad" by the K-pop boy band Ateez, in which she portrays a new human form of the Sopro, a spirit character significant to the band's lore. Infiniti is a longtime fan of Ateez.

== Filmography ==
Key
†	Denotes films that have not yet been released

=== Film ===
Year	Title	Role	Director	Notes
2025	One Battle After Another	Willa Ferguson / Charlene Calhoun	Paul Thomas Anderson	
2026	The Julia Set	Julia	Niki Byrne	Also executive producer

=== Television ===
Year	Title	Role	Notes
2024	Presumed Innocent	Jaden Sabich	Main role, 8 episodes
2026–present	The Testaments	Agnes MacKenzie / Hannah Bankole	Main role, 10 episodes

=== Music videos ===
Year	Song	Artist	Role	References
2025	"Darling, I"	Tyler, the Creator		
2026	"Bad"	Ateez	Sopro	

== Accolades ==
On October 19, 2025, Infiniti was named one of Variety's "10 Actors to Watch" at the Newport Beach Film Festival. In December 2025, Infiniti was announced as one of BAFTA's "Breakthrough U.S." cohort, for her work in Presumed Innocent and One Battle After Another.

Organizations	Year	Category	Work	Result	Ref.
AACTA International Awards	2026	Best Actress	One Battle After Another	Nominated	
Actor Awards	2026	Outstanding Performance by a Cast in a Motion Picture	One Battle After Another	Nominated	
Actor Awards	2026	Outstanding Performance by a Female Actor in a Leading Role	One Battle After Another	Nominated	
Alliance of Women Film Journalists	2025	Best Women's Breakthrough Performance	One Battle After Another	Won	
Alliance of Women Film Journalists	2025	Best Stunt Performance	One Battle After Another	Won	
Astra Film Awards	2026	Best Actress - Comedy or Musical	One Battle After Another	Nominated	
Astra Film Awards	2026	Best Cast Ensemble	One Battle After Another	Nominated	
Austin Film Critics Association	2025	The Robert R. "Bobby" McCurdy Memorial Breakthrough Award	One Battle After Another	Won	
Black Reel Awards	2026	Outstanding Lead Performance	One Battle After Another	Nominated	
Black Reel Awards	2026	Outstanding Breakthrough Performance	One Battle After Another	Nominated	
British Academy Film Awards	2026	BAFTA Rising Star Award	—N/a	Nominated	
British Academy Film Awards	2026	Best Actress in a Leading Role	One Battle After Another	Nominated	
Chicago Film Critics Association	2025	Most Promising Performer	One Battle After Another	Won	
Critics' Choice Movie Awards	2026	Best Actress	One Battle After Another	Nominated	
Dallas–Fort Worth Film Critics Association	2025	Best Actress	One Battle After Another	5th place	
Florida Film Critics Circle	2025	Pauline Kael Breakout Award	One Battle After Another	Won	
Georgia Film Critics Association	2025	Best Actress	One Battle After Another	Nominated	
Georgia Film Critics Association	2025	Breakthrough Performance	One Battle After Another	2nd place	
Georgia Film Critics Association	2025	Best Ensemble	One Battle After Another	Won	
Golden Globe Awards	2026	Best Actress in a Motion Picture – Musical or Comedy	One Battle After Another	Nominated	
Gotham Awards	2025	Breakthrough Performer	One Battle After Another	Nominated	
Gotham TV Awards	2026	Outstanding Lead Performance in a Drama Series	The Testaments	Won	
Houston Film Critics Society	2026	Best Actress	One Battle After Another	Nominated	
London Film Critics' Circle	2026	Breakthrough Performer of the Year	One Battle After Another	Nominated	
NAACP Image Awards	2026	Outstanding Breakthrough Performance in a Motion Picture	One Battle After Another	Nominated	
National Board of Review	2026	Breakthrough Performance	One Battle After Another	Won	
New York Film Critics Online	2025	Breakthrough Performance	One Battle After Another	Won	
Primetime Emmy Awards	2026	Outstanding Lead Actress in a Drama Series	The Testaments	Nominated	
San Diego Film Critics Society	2025	Breakthrough Performance	One Battle After Another	Won	
Santa Barbara International Film Festival	2026	Virtuoso Award	One Battle After Another	Won	
Satellite Awards	2026	Best Actress in a Motion Picture – Drama	One Battle After Another	Nominated	
St. Louis Film Critics Association	2025	Best Actress	One Battle After Another	Nominated	
St. Louis Film Critics Association	2025	Best Ensemble	One Battle After Another	Won	
Toronto Film Critics Association	2025	Outstanding Breakthrough Performance	One Battle After Another	Nominated	
Washington D.C. Area Film Critics Association	2025	Best Actress	One Battle After Another	Nominated	
Washington D.C. Area Film Critics Association	2025	Best Ensemble	One Battle After Another	Nominated	
