= For Worse =

American independent film

- Theatrical release poster
- Directed by: Amy Landecker
- Screenplay by: Amy Landecker
- Produced by: Amy Landecker; Bradley Whitford; Valerie Stadler; Jenica Bergere; James Portolese
- Starring: Amy Landecker; Nico Hiraga; Missi Pyle; Gaby Hoffmann; Kiersey Clemons; Ken Marino; Paul Adelstein; Angelique Cabral; Simon Helberg; Bradley Whitford
- Cinematography: Rebecca Baehler
- Edited by: Jason Gallagher
- Music by: Jason Gallagher
- Production companies: Big Swing Productions; 285 Pictures; For Better Productions
- Distributed by: Brainstorm Media
- Release dates: March 10, 2025 (SXSW); March 6, 2026 (United States)
- Running time: 90 minutes
- Country: United States
- Language: English
- Box office: $44,341

For Worse is a 2025 American romantic comedy film written and directed by Amy Landecker. The film stars Landecker, Nico Hiraga, Missi Pyle, Gaby Hoffmann, Kiersey Clemons, Ken Marino, Paul Adelstein, Angelique Cabral, Simon Helberg, and Bradley Whitford.

It premiered at the South by Southwest Film & TV Festival on March 10, 2025, and it was released in the United States on March 6, 2026.

== Premise ==
A recent divorcée starts drama classes in an attempt to start a new phase in her life.

== Cast ==
- Amy Landecker as Lauren
- Paris Berelc as Aspen
- Paul Adelstein as Chase
- Bradley Whitford as Dave
- Lilli Kay as Tina
- Nico Hiraga as Sean
- Gaby Hoffmann as Liz
- Ken Marino as Rick
- Missi Pyle as Julie
- Kiersey Clemons as Maria
- Claudia Sulewski as Coco
- Simon Helberg as Mediator
- Liv Hewson as Esther
- Angelique Cabral as Sara
- Jay Lacopo as Chuck
- Josh Zuckerman as Jonah
- Briana Venskus as Justine
- Rizwan Manji as Mark
- Carlos Valdes as Patrick
- Enuka Okuma as Debbie
- Liz Larsen as Judy
- Jill-Michele Meleán as Justine’s mother

== Production ==
The film is the debut feature from Amy Landecker who writes, directs and produces alongside Bradley Whitford, Valerie Stadler, Jenica Bergere, and James Portolese. Cinematography by Rebecca Baehler. Landecker and Whitford also have lead roles in the cast.

== Release ==
The film premiered at the South by Southwest Film & TV Festival on March 10, 2025. It was released in the United States on March 6, 2026.

== Reception ==
On the review aggregator website Rotten Tomatoes, 77% of 31 critics' reviews are positive, with an average rating of 6.6/10.
