= Hello, Goodbye, and Everything in Between =

2022 film by Michael Lewen

- Official release poster
- Directed by: Michael Lewen
- Screenplay by: Amy Reed; Ben York Jones
- Based on: Hello, Goodbye, and Everything in Between by Jennifer E. Smith
- Produced by: Matt Kaplan
- Starring: Jordan Fisher; Talia Ryder; Ayo Edebiri; Nico Hiraga
- Cinematography: Bryce Fortner
- Edited by: Joe Landauer
- Music by: Mike Tuccillo
- Production companies: ACE Entertainment; Lionsgate
- Distributed by: Netflix
- Release date: July 6, 2022
- Running time: 84 minutes
- Country: United States
- Language: English

Hello, Goodbye, and Everything in Between is a 2022 American romantic drama film directed by Michael Lewen, in his directorial debut, from a screenplay by Amy Reed and Ben York Jones, based on the novel of the same name by Jennifer E. Smith. It stars Jordan Fisher, Talia Ryder, Ayo Edebiri, and Nico Hiraga.

As Claire and Aiden had made a pact to break up before college at the onset, he plans they retrace the steps of their relationship on one last epic date. He hopes by revisiting familiar and unexpected places she question the plan to say goodbye.

The film was released on July 6, 2022, by Netflix.

== Plot ==
High school senior Clare recently moved back to a west coast town, her old friend Stella convinces her to attend a Halloween party. Meeting Aiden, after a brief conversation, he takes over the stage in a Ferris Bueller homage karaoke of Twist and Shout.

Immediately connecting, Clare and Aiden leave the party together, having a spontaneous date. Moving from state to state after her parents' divorce, she has made few friends. Therefore Clare has focused on her studies to become a lawyer to help people. Aiden is the opposite, his parents are stable and still married, both doctors. Although he wants to be a professional musician, they would rather he become a doctor.

They go from stealing candies from a local shop to enjoying a playground. Feeling the spark, Aiden leans in to kiss her, but Clare declares she does not want a boyfriend (as her parents were high school sweethearts who married but soon divorced). Aiden proposes a breakup pact: if they are still together through the end of next summer, they break up after an epic last date. Clare agrees, they kiss and begin a high school romance.

At summer's end, the day before Clare's road trip to Dartmouth, at a barbecue with both families, they are told they are naïve to give up on love. Nonetheless, Aiden has planned their last date. He hopes the perfect night will convince her to stay together. The first stop is a musical performance by Aiden's old band. And on their first date he had performed for her, they danced to the song, cherishing the memory.

Next, Aiden takes Clare to the ice hockey rink to correct a wrong. They had their first fight there, over his need to be perfect. He confesses he lied then, and they play hockey together. The third stop is on a speedboat, a reminder of a day doing water sports. Clare had flipped from the raft and when she successfully swam back to it, Aiden confessed his love for her. She replied, “easy-breezy.” Their friend, Scotty, had remarked that Clare had rocketed, and to freeze that memory, he gives her a rocket-shaped key ring with this written on the back.

The never-ending gestures of love gradually overwhelm Clare and she begins to doubt herself. At the spot where they had celebrated Valentine's Day, struggling, she texts Stella to join them. When Aiden reappears in a tux, he sees Stella has joined what was supposed to be their perfect date.

Now just a friendly dinner with Stella and Scotty, Scotty mentions he never tagged the school wall, Clare insists they break into the school for him. Although Clare hopes no one realizes her intention, Aiden tells Stella he knows she is trying to divert their romantic date. Clare tells Scotty of her hopes for a clean break with Aiden, but he sees it as difficult. She believes his going to his dream college Berklee would have made it easier for him, as she is looking forward to college life.

The burglar alarm goes off, and Aiden injures his hand in their escape. At the hospital, his mother attends him. Clare finds out Aiden was not accepted at Berklee and is furious. Confronting him for not telling her, tired of his dishonesty, she doubts if he even intended to say goodbye. They spend most of the night apart at a party.

When Aiden expresses his love for her, Clare cannot say the same. He leaves heartbroken, feeling their relationship has truly ended. Clare's mother helps her realize a relationship cannot work if the end is decided before it even starts. Intending to end it with Aiden on the right note, she texts him to meet her. Confessing her love, they swim to the buoy together. Afterwards, Aiden admits he now agrees with her, even if it hurts. He defers a year to go to Los Angeles to pursue music.

Clare leaves for New Hampshire the next morning, focused on her studies, though regularly checking Aiden's social media updates. An LA musician releases a song online. Deciding to meet again during Clare's summer break, they meet at the playground, just like when they first met.

== Cast ==
- Jordan Fisher as Aidan
- Talia Ryder as Clare
- Ayo Edebiri as Stella
- Nico Hiraga as Scotty
- Jennifer Robertson as Nancy
- Eva Day as Riley
- Julia Benson as Claudia
- Dalias Blake as Rick
- Patrick Sabongui as Steve
- Sarah Grey as Collette
- Djouliet Amara as Tess

== Production ==
In September 2020, Talia Ryder and Jordan Fisher joined the cast of the film, with Michael Lewen set to make his directorial debut, from a screenplay by Ben York Jones and Amy Reed, based upon the novel of the same name by Jennifer E. Smith, with Fisher set to serve as an executive producer. In October 2020, Ayo Edebiri, Nico Hiraga, Jennifer Robertson, Patrick Sabongui, Eva Day, Julia Benson, Dalias Blake, Sarah Grey and Djouliet Amara joined the cast of the film. Principal photography began in October 2020.

== Reception ==
On the review aggregator website Rotten Tomatoes, 29% of 21 critics' reviews are positive, with an average rating of 4.9/10. On Metacritic, the film has a weighted average score of 54 out of 100 based on 9 critics, indicating "mixed or average" reviews.
