= Sweethearts (2024 film) =

Film by Jordan Weiss

- Release poster
- Directed by: Jordan Weiss
- Written by: Dan Brier; Jordan Weiss
- Produced by: Erik Feig; Jessica Switch
- Starring: Kiernan Shipka; Nico Hiraga; Caleb Hearon; Tramell Tillman; Charlie Hall; Ava DeMary
- Cinematography: Andrew Wehde
- Edited by: Kayla M. Emter; Mark Sadlek
- Music by: Jonathan Sadoff
- Production companies: New Line Cinema; Picturestart
- Distributed by: Warner Bros. Pictures
- Release date: November 28, 2024
- Running time: 98 minutes
- Country: United States
- Language: English

Sweethearts is a 2024 American romantic comedy film directed and co-written by Jordan Weiss in her feature directorial debut. Produced by New Line Cinema and Picturestart, it stars Kiernan Shipka, Nico Hiraga, Caleb Hearon, Tramell Tillman, Charlie Hall, and Ava DeMary. The film was released on Max on November 28, 2024.

== Plot ==
Ben and Jamie are college freshmen and best friends since eighth grade. They are both in long-distance relationships with their high school sweethearts. Ben's girlfriend Claire is controlling, and Jamie pushes him to set boundaries. Jamie is bored of her boyfriend, Simon, and struggles to develop friendships due to childhood bullying. Ben pushes Jamie to let her guard down and make friends. Unbeknownst to Jamie, Ben is planning to study abroad in Copenhagen next semester. He is afraid to tell her because he does not want her to feel abandoned.

At their first college party, Ben rebuffs the sexual advances of a drunken woman while Jamie sneaks into a bedroom to sext with Simon. Jamie is forced to leave her clothes in the room when two partygoers enter to have sex. Ben attempts to sneak into the room to retrieve Jamie's clothes but is caught. They are ejected from the party. Their friend Palmer reveals he is returning to their hometown in Ohio and will be hosting a coming out party the night before Thanksgiving. Ben and Jamie decide they are going to end their relationships that night.

When Ben's roommate takes his car without permission, the duo's trip is delayed and they are forced to take the bus. Later at Palmer's, Claire and Simon drink an entire bottle of absinthe and drunkenly leave. With help from Reese, a local school football coach, Claire and Simon are safely returned. Palmer, realizing Reese is also gay, confides in him. Reese brings Palmer to a bowling alley and introduces his bowling team consisting of all gay men. Palmer finds newfound comfort and confidence.

Meanwhile, Ben and Jamie search for Claire and Simon at a bar. They are forced to sneak in, and Jamie is confronted by her childhood bully who asks for forgiveness which Jamie begrudgingly accepts. The bouncer catches them and they are thrown out. Frustrated, Ben and Jamie argue about their circumstances and become upset with one another. They learn Claire and Simon are at another party and head there. At the party, Palmer accidentally reveals to Jamie about Ben's plans to study abroad. Jamie realizes that she is the only one who did not know. Angry, she leaves to find Simon.

Claire attempts to seduce Ben in an outdoor tree fort, unbeknownst to Jamie, who is breaking up with Simon below. Ben and Claire overhear the conversation, and Claire becomes angry after learning Ben and Jamie planned the breakups together. Claire and Simon leave, believing Ben and Jamie are co-dependent and carrying out a secret romance. Ben and Jamie discuss their relationship, sharing a passionate kiss. As the party ends, the friends all return home.

On Thanksgiving, Ben watches When Harry Met Sally..., appearing to have an epiphany about Jamie. He confronts Jamie, revealing he regrets the kiss and does not hold romantic feelings toward her, and instead wants to remain friends. Jamie expresses relief; she reciprocates and wishes him well on his upcoming trip. Jamie meets with Simon and properly breaks up with him before returning to school. Ben does the same with Claire before leaving for Europe. Palmer begins a relationship with a local man named Lukas.

Six months later, Ben returns and surprises Jamie at her sorority's party. While dancing, they share loving glances.

== Cast ==
- Kiernan Shipka as Jamie
- Nico Hiraga as Ben
- Caleb Hearon as Palmer
- Ava DeMary as Claire
- Charlie Hall as Simon
- Tramell Tillman as Coach Reese
- Joel Kim Booster as Ethan
- Miles Gutierrez-Riley as Lukas
- Zach Zucker as Tyler
- Christine Taylor as Diane
- Kevin Yamada as Norman
- Sophie Zucker as Megan Mendelson
- Olivia Nikkanen as Kelly
- Jake Bongiovi as Kellan
- Chloe Troast as Hannah
- Stavros Halkias as Airpods Guy

== Production ==
Weiss co-wrote the screenplay with Dan Brier. Erik Feig and Jessica Switch serve as producers, with Picturestart producing for New Line Cinema. The cast was revealed to include Kiernan Shipka and Nico Hiraga in July 2022. In August 2022, Charlie Hall was added to the cast.

Principal photography on the film was reportedly completed August 2022. Filming locations included Jersey City and Cranford and at Ramapo College in Mahwah, all located in the state of New Jersey.

== Release ==
Sweethearts was streamed on Max on November 28, 2024.

=== Critical response ===
On the review aggregator website Rotten Tomatoes, 61% of 28 critics' reviews are positive, with an average rating of 6.2/10. Metacritic, which uses a weighted average, assigned the film a score of 57 out of 100, based on 10 critics, indicating "mixed or average" reviews.

Writing for RogerEbert.com, critic Monica Castillo noted that the film "can feel like a grab bag of rom com leftovers" and that it "has its charming moments but feels uneven," adding that the characters "Ben and Jamie have a combative dynamic that’s not very fun to watch and makes a person wonder how these two characters managed to be friends for so long." The performance of Shipka was described as "a bit uncomfortable" and "less natural next to her co-star’s, and adds to the film’s sense of unevenness." Adrian Horton described the film in The Guardian as "plenty spicy and enough sweet," contrasted the performances of Shipka ("[she] finally seems to be working through some longtime on-screen stiffness") and Hiraga ("[he] excels at playing the lovable, physically affectionate good-guy stoner"), and noted that the plot element involving Palmer was "far more nuanced and substantial than the usual B-plot, sweet but not cloying, largely thanks to impeccable comedic timing by the helplessly endearing Hearon."
