= An Iron Hand in a Velvet Glove =

- Digital cover

EP by Jini
- Released: October 11, 2023
- Genre: K-pop
- Language: Korean; English
- Label: ATOC

Singles from An Iron Hand in a Velvet Glove
- 1. "C'mon" Released: October 11, 2023

Professional ratings
Review scores
Source	Rating
NME	3/5 stars

An Iron Hand in a Velvet Glove is the debut extended play (EP) by South Korean singer Jini. It was released by ATOC on October 11, 2023. The EP contains five tracks, including the lead single "C'mon" featuring Aminé.

== Title ==
The title of the album, An Iron Hand in a Velvet Glove, encapsulates the contrasting notions of a 'Velvet Glove', representing softness and beauty, and an 'Iron Hand', symbolizing strength and resilience.

== Background and release ==
On December 9, 2022, JYP Entertainment announced that Jini, then member of the South Korean girl group Nmixx under the stage name Jinni, had departed from the group and terminated her contract due to personal circumstances. On March 18, 2023, 3 months after her departure from the group, Jini opened up a personal Instagram account, hinting at a possible return to the entertainment industry. On April 14, it was reported that Jini had signed an exclusive contract with the record label United Artist Production (UAP), which has since changed its name to ATOC. Further hints of her return were teased in a TikTok video posted on September 3, which featured clips of her seemingly recording a song and rehearsing a dance choreography.

On September 14, 2023, Jini announced her debut as a solo artist with An Iron Hand in a Velvet Glove. The next day, the promotion schedule was released, revealing the EP's release date to be October 11, 2023. A trailer for the EP was released on September 18. On September 23, the track listing for the EP was released with "C'mon" announced as the lead single. Concept videos featuring short snippets of the five tracks on the EP was released on September 25 and 27. On October 4, the music video for the track "Bad Reputation" was released ahead of the release of the EP. Teasers for the music video for the title track "C'mon" were released on October 6 and 9.

On October 11, 2023, An Iron Hand in a Velvet Glove was released alongside its lead single "C'mon", featuring American rapper Aminé.

== Track listing ==
Track listing for An Iron Hand in a Velvet Glove
No.	Title	Lyrics	Music	Arrangement	Length
1.	"Here We Go Again"	Ahn Young-joo (MUMW)	Jackson Morgan; Andrew Stoelzing; Mike Robinson; MZMC; Jay Kim	Mike Robinson; MZMC	3:01
2.	"C'mon" (featuring Aminé)	JBach; Kaelyn Behr; MZMC; Aminé	JBach; Kaelyn Behr; MZMC; Jay Kim	Kaelyn Behr; MZMC	3:13
3.	"Dancing with the Devil"	Newny (MUMW); Erin (MUMW)	JBach; Anthony Pavel; Christian French; Pink Slip; Charles Nelson; MZMC; Jay Kim	Pink Slip; Inverness; MZMC	2:46
4.	"Bad Reputation"	Jini; Erin (MUMW)	MNEK; Alida Garpestad Peck; Kriss Tømmerbakke; Erik Smaaland; Sean Fischer; MZMC; Jay Kim	Sean Fischer; MZMC	1:54
5.	"C'mon" (featuring Aminé; Korean version)	Surin (MUMW); JBach; Kaelyn Behr; MZMC; Jay Kim	JBach; Kaelyn Behr; MZMC; Jay Kim	Kaelyn Behr; MZMC	3:13
Total length:					14:08

== Charts ==
=== Weekly charts ===
Weekly chart performance for An Iron Hand in a Velvet Glove
Chart (2023)	Peak position
South Korean Albums (Circle)	9

=== Monthly charts ===
Monthly chart performance for An Iron Hand in a Velvet Glove
Chart (2023)	Peak position
South Korean Albums (Circle)	22

== Release history ==
Release history and formats for An Iron Hand in a Velvet Glove
Region	Date	Format	Label
South Korea	October 11, 2023	CD	ATOC
Various	October 11, 2023	Digital download; streaming	ATOC
