= OnePointFive =

Mixtape by Aminé
- Released: August 15, 2018
- Length: 34:46
- Label: Republic; CLBN
- Producer: Aminé (also exec.); Pasqué (also exec.); Charlie Brown; Ckwnce; Davon Jamison; Tee-Watt; Tedd Boyd; LDG Beats

Aminé chronology
Good for You (2017)	OnePointFive (2018)	Limbo (2020)

Singles from OnePointFive
- 1. "Reel It In" Released: September 25, 2018

OnePointFive (stylized in all caps) is the third mixtape by American rapper Aminé. It was released on August 15, 2018, through Republic Records and Club Banana. The project follows his debut studio album Good for You (2017). The project features guest appearances by G Herbo, Gunna and Rico Nasty. The project was executively produced by Aminé himself, alongside frequent collaborator Pasqué, and features production from Tee-Watt, alongside a variety of producers, including LDG Beats, Charlie Brown, Ckwnce and Davon Jamison, among others.

== Background ==
A day before the album's release, Aminé released a video teaser, referring it as an "LP/EP/Mixtape/Album". Furthermore, he explained how "Mixtapes are albums and albums are mixtapes. Niggas call they albums mixtapes 'cause if [it] flops, it's an EP. Nah, that's like a b-side, bro."

== Promotion ==
The music video for "Reel It In" was released on September 5, 2018. It was later serviced to US rhythmic contemporary radio stations as the lead single from the mixtape on September 25. A remix was later released featuring rapper Gucci Mane on November 20.

The music video for, "Blackjack", was released on January 23, 2019. A remix featuring rapper YBN Cordae was released on February 8.

== Track listing ==
Credits adapted from Tidal.

No.	Title	Writer(s)	Producer(s)	Length
1.	"Dr. Whoever"	Adam Daniel; Irvin Mejia; Charlie Brown	Aminé; Pasqué; Brown	4:19
2.	"Hiccup" (featuring Gunna)	Daniel; Sergio Kitchens; Terry Watson; Latrell Boyd	Tee-Watt; Tedd Boyd^{[a]}; Aminé^{[a]}	2:59
3.	"Reel It In"	Daniel; Watson; Lawrence Greenidge	Tee-Watt; LDG Beats^{[a]}	2:01
4.	"Blackjack"	Daniel; Mejia; Davon Jamison	Pasqué; Jamison^{[a]}; Aminé^{[b]}	1:57
5.	"Why?"	Daniel; Watson; Mejia	Tee-Watt; Pasqué^{[a]}	3:46
6.	"Shine"	Daniel; Mejia	Pasqué	2:30
7.	"Chingy"	Daniel; Watson; Adrien Burgo	Tee-Watt; Ckwnce^{[a]}	2:02
8.	"Dapper Dan" (featuring G Herbo)	Daniel; Mejia; Herbert Wright III; Greenidge	Pasqué; LDG Beats^{[b]}	2:52
9.	"Cantu"	Daniel; Mejia	Pasqué; Aminé^{[b]}	2:37
10.	"Sugarparents" (featuring Rico Nasty)	Daniel; Mejia; Maria-Cecilia Kelly	Pasqué; Aminé^{[b]}	1:59
11.	"STFU2"	Daniel; Mejia	Aminé; Pasqué	1:44
12.	"Ratchet Saturn Girl"	Daniel; Mejia; K. Johnson	Pasqué; Aminé^{[b]}	2:26
13.	"Together"	Daniel; Mejia	Pasqué	3:34
Total length:				34:46

Notes

- ^{^[a]} signifies a co-producer
- ^{^[b]} signifies an additional producer
- All tracks are stylized in all caps

== Personnel ==
Credits adapted from Tidal.

- Morning Estrada – recording (all tracks), mixing (tracks 2, 5, 6, 8, 11)
- David Nakaji – mixing (tracks 1, 3, 4, 7, 9, 10, 12, 13)
- Jacob Richards – mixing assistance (tracks 1, 3, 4, 7, 9, 10, 12, 13)
- Mike Seaberg – mixing assistance (tracks 1, 3, 4, 7, 9, 10, 12, 13)
- Emmanuel Gallegos – mixing assistance (tracks 2, 5, 6, 8, 11)

== Charts ==
Chart performance for OnePointFive
Chart (2018)	Peak position
Canadian Albums (Billboard)	61
US Billboard 200	53
US Top R&B/Hip-Hop Albums (Billboard)	25

== Certifications ==
Certifications for OnePointFive
Region	Certification	Certified units/sales
New Zealand (RMNZ)	Gold	7,500^{‡}
^{‡} Sales+streaming figures based on certification alone.
