= Santa Monica Courthouse =

Government building in Santa Monica, California, U.S.

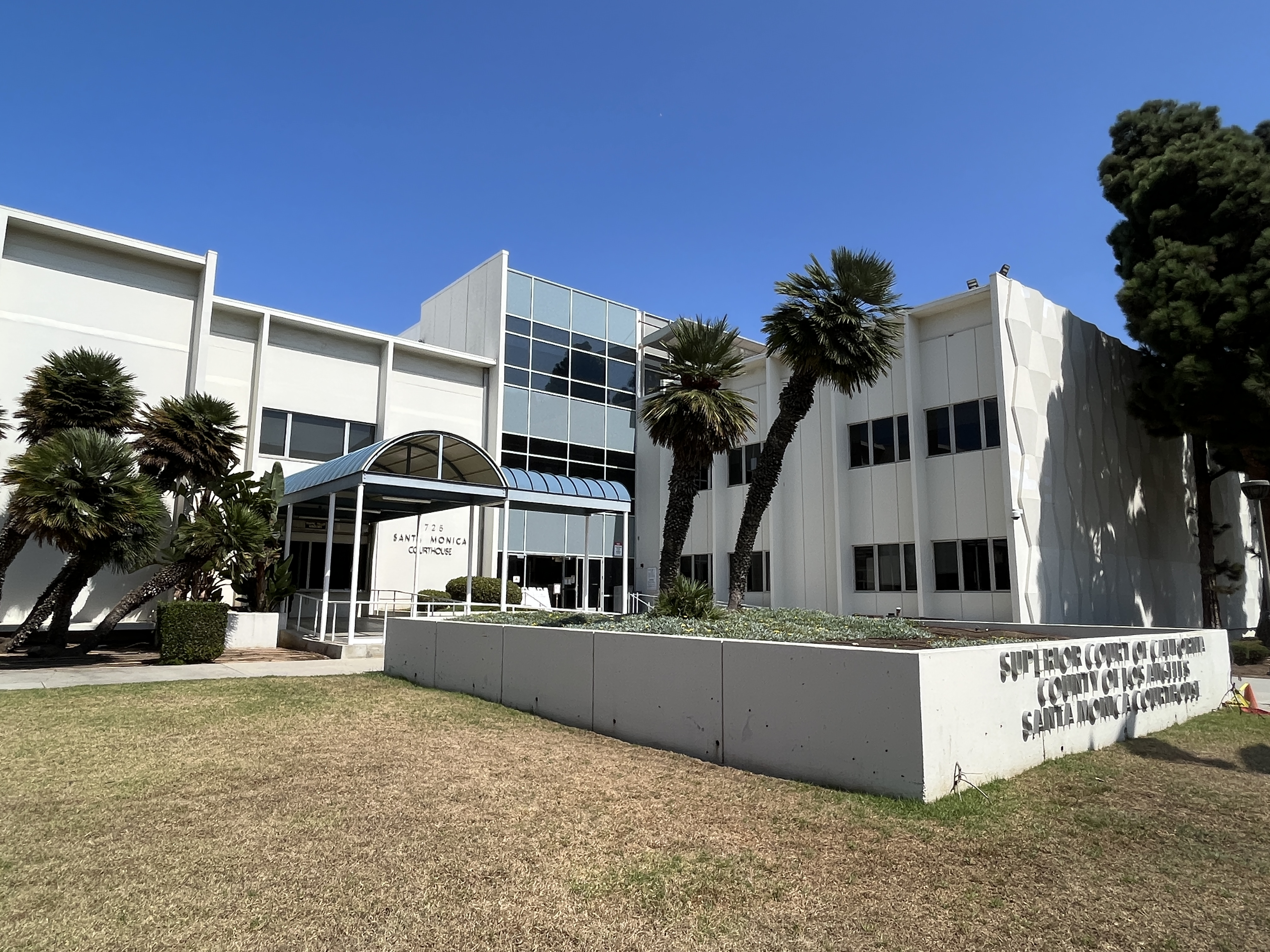
- The building's exterior, 2022
- Interactive map of the Santa Monica Courthouse area

General information
- Location: Santa Monica, California, United States
- Coordinates: 34°0′39.5″N 118°29′25.5″W

The Santa Monica Courthouse is a government building in Santa Monica, California, in the United States.
