= Caroline (Aminé song) =

Single by Aminé

from the album Good for You
- Released: March 9, 2016
- Recorded: 2016
- Genre: Hip-hop; alternative hip-hop
- Length: 3:29
- Label: Republic
- Songwriters: Adam Daniel; Irvin Mejia
- Producers: Aminé; Pasqué

Aminé singles chronology
"Caroline" (2016)	"Baba" (2016)

Music video
- "Caroline" on YouTube

"Caroline" is the debut single by American rapper Aminé. Written and produced alongside Pasqué, it was released on March 9, 2016 as the lead single from his debut studio album Good for You (2017).

== Background ==
In an interview with Genius, Aminé said that:

The first time I heard the name "Caroline" was in OutKast's "Roses", so that was definitely an influence on me in general. But I wrote this song with the intentions of hopefully making a modern day "Billie Jean". Caroline represents the handful of women I've met in my life that I would put genuine effort in.

== Music video ==
The song's accompanying music video premiered on June 1, 2016, on Aminé's Vevo account on YouTube. As of March 2024, it has amassed over 369 million views.

== Charts ==
=== Weekly charts ===
Weekly chart performance for "Caroline"
Chart (2016–2017)	Peak position
Canada Hot 100 (Billboard)	33
New Zealand (Recorded Music NZ)	16
US Billboard Hot 100	11
US Hot R&B/Hip-Hop Songs (Billboard)	5
US Pop Airplay (Billboard)	30
US Rhythmic Airplay (Billboard)	3

=== Year-end charts ===
Year-end chart performance for "Caroline"
Chart (2016)	Position
US Hot R&B/Hip-Hop Songs (Billboard)	60
Chart (2017)	Position
US Billboard Hot 100	60
US Hot R&B/Hip-Hop Songs (Billboard)	37
US Rhythmic (Billboard)	28

== Certifications ==
Certifications for "Caroline"
Region	Certification	Certified units/sales
Brazil (Pro-Música Brasil)	Gold	30,000^{‡}
Canada (Music Canada)	Platinum	80,000^{‡}
New Zealand (RMNZ)	3× Platinum	90,000^{‡}
Portugal (AFP)	Gold	5,000^{‡}
United Kingdom (BPI)	Gold	400,000^{‡}
United States (RIAA)	6× Platinum	6,000,000^{‡}
^{‡} Sales+streaming figures based on certification alone.
