= Vanessa Caswill =

English director and writer

Vanessa Caswill is an English director and screenwriter.

Caswill directed the BBC miniseries Thirteen (2016) and Little Women (2017). She also directed the film Love at First Sight (2023).

== Filmography ==
Title	Year	Role
A Fairytale of the City (Short)	2006	Director, writer, executive producer
Pudding Bowl (Short)	2007	Director, writer
The Fishdance Kid (Short)	2009	Director
The Caterpillar and Fly (Short)	2010	Director, writer
Magpie (Short)	2010	Director, writer
Love Matters (TV series)	2013	Director
Flea (Short)	2014	Director
My Mad Fat Diary (TV series)	2014	Director of episode "Inappropriate Adult"
Thirteen	2016	Director
Little Women	2017	Director
Snatches: Moments from Women's Lives	2018	Director
Gold Digger	2019	Director
Love at First Sight	2023	Director
Reminders of Him	2026	Director
