= Jini (singer) =

South Korean singer and rapper (born 2004)

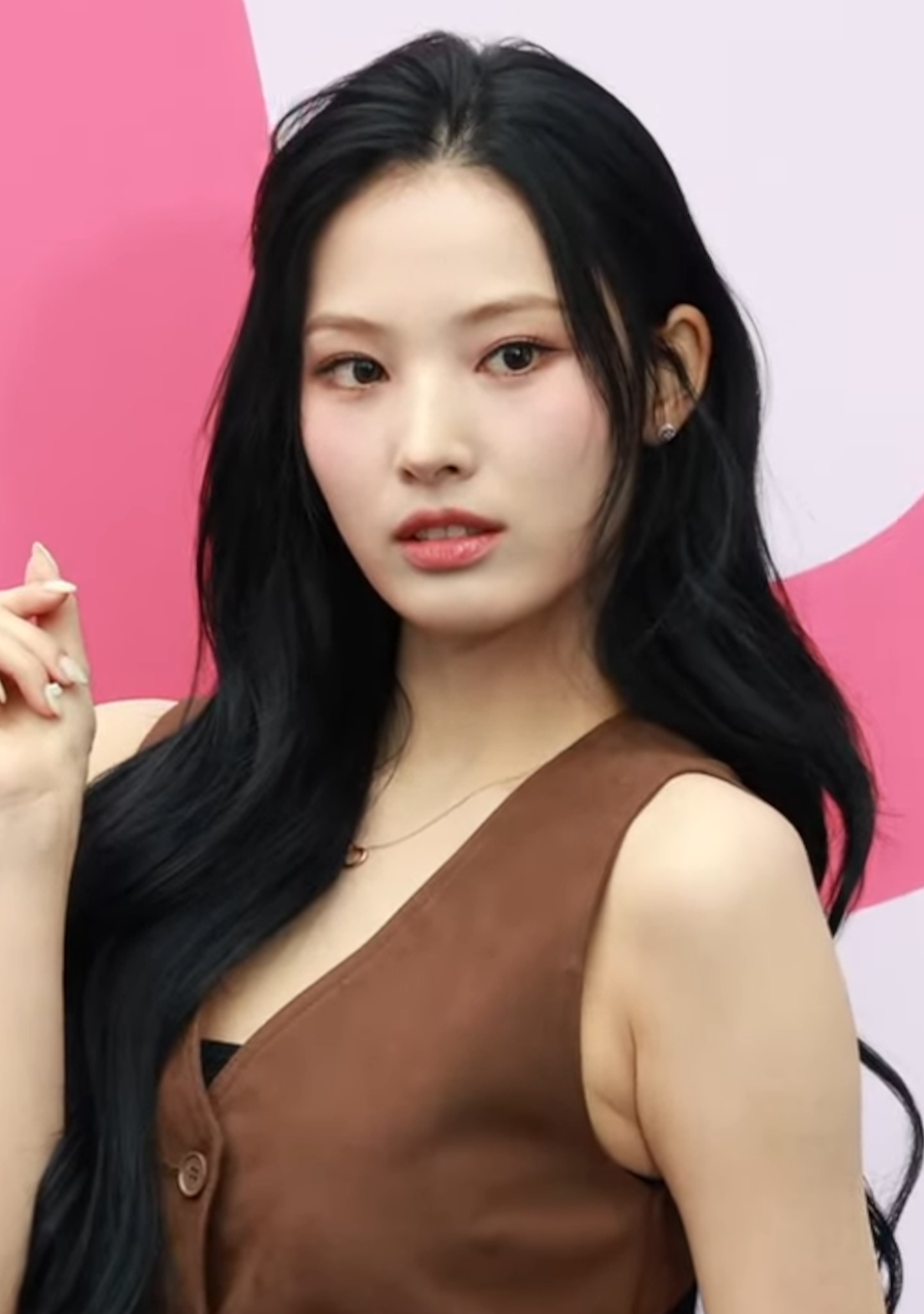
- Jini in February 2024
- Born: Choi Yun-jin; April 16, 2004 (age 22); Busan, South Korea
- Occupations: Singer; rapper; actress
- Agent: Sublime
- Musical career
- Genre: K-pop
- Instrument: Vocals
- Years active: 2022–present
- Labels: JYP; ATOC
- Formerly of: Nmixx

Korean name
- Hangul: 최윤진
- RR: Choe Yunjin
- MR: Ch'oe Yunjin

Stage name
- Hangul: 지니
- RR: Jini
- MR: Chini

Signature
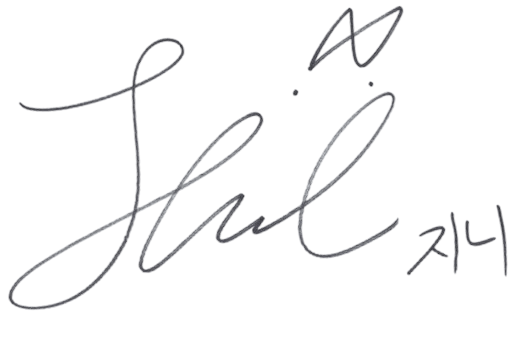

Choi Yun-jin (Korean: 최윤진; born April 16, 2004), known professionally as Jini (지니, formerly romanized as Jinni), is a South Korean singer, rapper and actress. She debuted as a member of the South Korean girl group Nmixx in February 2022. Following her departure from the ensemble and JYP Entertainment on December 9, 2022, she joined ATOC as a solo artist.

== Early life ==
Jini was born on April 16, 2004, as Choi Yun-jin, in Busan, South Korea.

== Career ==
=== Pre-debut and Nmixx ===
Jini joined JYP Entertainment as a trainee in 2016. In 2019, she appeared in 2PM's Nichkhun's music video for his solo debut single "Lucky Charm". On August 6, 2021, Jini, along with Jiwoo and Kyujin, were revealed as the first three members of Nmixx (then known as "JYPn"), through a dance performance video.

Jini officially debuted with the group on February 22, 2022, with the single album Ad Mare, alongside its lead single "O.O". Later that year on December 9, JYP Entertainment announced that she departed from Nmixx and the agency for personal reasons.

=== 2023–present: An Iron Hand in a Velvet Glove and acting debut ===
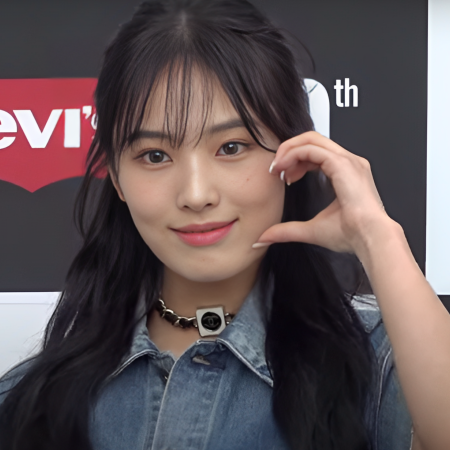
Jini in May 2023

On April 14, 2023, it was reported by news media that Jini had signed an exclusive contract with ATOC (formerly called UAP), which have also signed a management MOU collaboration with Sublime to manage her acting activities. This was later confirmed by Sublime. Jini made her solo debut on October 11, with the EP An Iron Hand in a Velvet Glove.

On January 25, 2024, Jini released the song "Starlight" as part of the soundtrack for Naver Webtoon No Office Romance!. On November 13, it was announced that Jini would be making her acting debut in the film Boy, which premiere at the 35th Fancine Film Festival on December 12, 2025. She also made her first leading role in the 2025 Kanta short form horror web series Demon's Profile Picture, portraying Ji-hyo. On April 14, 2026, Jini was cast in a youth romance web series The Girl from Class, portraying as a student.

== Endorsement ==
In September 2023, Jini became the new muse for the skincare brand Mixsoon.

== Discography ==
=== Extended plays ===
List of extended plays, showing selected details, selected chart positions, and sales figures
Title	Details	Peak chart positions	Sales
Title	Details	KOR	Sales
An Iron Hand in a Velvet Glove	Released: October 11, 2023; Label: ATOC; Formats: CD, digital download, streaming	9	KOR: 61,904

=== Singles ===
List of singles, showing year released, selected chart positions, and name of the album
Title	Year	Peak chart positions	Album
Title	Year	KOR DL	Album
"C'mon" (featuring Aminé)	2023	137	An Iron Hand in a Velvet Glove

=== Soundtrack appearances ===
List of soundtrack appearances, showing year released and album name
Title	Year	Album
"Starlight" (나의 별)	2024	No Office Romance! OST

=== Songwriting credits ===
List of songs, showing year released, artist name, and name of the album
Title	Year	Artist	Album	Composer	Lyricist	Ref.
"Bad Reputation"	2023	Jini	An Iron Hand in a Velvet Glove	No	Yes	

== Videography ==
=== Music videos ===
Year	Title	Director(s)	Length	Ref.
2023	"Bad Reputation"	Geeeembo, Lee Jaedon	1:52	
2023	"C'mon"	Geeeembo, Lee Jaedon	3:16	

== Filmography ==
=== Film ===
Year	Title	Role	Ref.
2025	Boy	Jane	

=== Web series ===
Year	Title	Role	Ref.
2025	Demon's Profile Picture	Ji-hyo	
2026	The Girl in Class	Student girl	

=== Music video appearances ===
Year	Title	Artist	Ref.
2018	"Lucky Charm"	Nichkhun	
2026	"She in Class"	Jang Beom-jun	
