= Sunny Suljic =

American actor and skateboarder (born 2005)

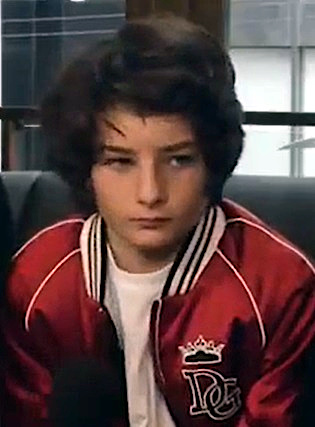
- Suljic at TIFF in 2018
- Born: August 10, 2005 (age 20); Roswell, Georgia, U.S.
- Occupation: Actor
- Years active: 2013–present

Sunny Suljic (/ˈsʌldʒɪk/; born August 10, 2005) is an American actor, professional skateboarder and musician. He is known for his roles as Bob in Yorgos Lanthimos's 2017 drama The Killing of a Sacred Deer and as the voice and motion capture actor for Atreus, the son of Kratos, in the 2018 video game God of War, for which he was nominated for the BAFTA Award for Best Performance in a Video Game and the D.I.C.E. Award for Outstanding Achievement in Character. He reprised the role in the game's 2022 sequel, God of War Ragnarök, for which he was nominated for Best Performance at The Game Awards 2022, the BAFTA Award for Performer in a Leading Role, and the D.I.C.E. Award for Outstanding Achievement in Character. In 2018, Suljic had his first lead role in Jonah Hill's film Mid90s, for which he received a Critics' Choice Movie Award for Best Young Performer nomination.

== Life and career ==
Sunny Suljic was born in Roswell, Georgia. to a Bosnian father and a Polish-born mother of Russian-Jewish descent.

He played Gabriel in the 2015 film 1915, and Bob Murphy in the 2017 film The Killing of a Sacred Deer. In 2018, he played "Stevie" in the drama film Mid90s, directed by Jonah Hill, and had a supporting role as Tarby Corrigan in the fantasy-horror family film The House with a Clock in Its Walls.

He also voiced and did the cinematic motion capture for the character Atreus, the son of Kratos, in the 2018 video game God of War, and reprised the role in its 2022 sequel, God of War Ragnarök.

== Filmography ==
=== Film ===
Year	Title	Role	Notes
2013	Ruined	Jody Dunlap	Short
2015	1915	Gabriel	
2015	The Unspoken	Adrian	
2017	The Killing of a Sacred Deer	Bob Murphy	
2018	Don't Worry, He Won't Get Far on Foot	Skateboarder #2	
2018	Mid90s	Stevie "Sunburn"	Nominated - Critics' Choice Movie Award for Best Young Performer
2018	The House with a Clock in Its Walls	Tarby Corrigan	
2020	The Christmas Chronicles 2	Doug Pierce	
2021	North Hollywood	Clark	
2025	Lurker	Jamie	

=== Television ===
Year	Title	Role	Notes
2014	Criminal Minds	Young Joe Bachner	1 episode
2016	Shady Neighbors	Oliver	TV movie

=== Video games ===
Year	Title	Role	Notes
2018	God of War	Atreus	Voice and motion capture Nominated - BAFTA Award for Performer; Nominated - D.I.C.E. Award for Outstanding Achievement in Character
2022	God of War Ragnarök	Atreus	Voice and motion capture Nominated - The Game Awards for Best Performance; Nominated - British Academy Games Award for Performer in a Leading Role; Nominated - D.I.C.E. Award for Outstanding Achievement in Character

=== Music video appearances ===
Year	Title	Artist	Notes
2020	"Out West"	JackBoys, Travis Scott, Young Thug	Cameo
2023	"Boys of Faith"	Aaron Bay-Schuck, Zach Bryan, Bon Iver	Cameo
