= Good for You (album) =

Studio album by Aminé
- Released: July 28, 2017
- Genre: Hip-hop; pop rap
- Length: 52:22
- Label: CLBN; Republic
- Producer: Aminé; Frank Dukes; Guy Lawrence; Jahaan Sweet; Malay; Metro Boomin; Pasqué; Vegyn

Aminé chronology
Calling Brío (2015)	Good for You (2017)	OnePointFive (2018)

Singles from Good for You
- 1. "Caroline" Released: March 9, 2016; 2. "Heebiejeebies" Released: May 26, 2017; 3. "Turf" Released: June 16, 2017; 4. "Wedding Crashers" Released: July 21, 2017; 5. "Spice Girl" Released: August 15, 2017

Good for You is the debut studio album by American rapper Aminé, released on July 28, 2017, by CLBN and Republic Records. The album features guest appearances from Ty Dolla Sign, Nelly, Offset, Charlie Wilson and Kehlani.

Good for You was supported by five singles: "Caroline", "Heebiejeebies", "Turf", "Wedding Crashers" and "Spice Girl". The album received generally positive reviews from critics and debuted at number 31 on the US Billboard 200.

== Background ==
On June 22, 2017, Aminé revealed the album's title name and cover along with its release date.

== Promotion ==
The lead single from the album, "Caroline", was released on March 9, 2016. The music video for the song was released on June 1, 2016. It peaked at number 11 on the US Billboard Hot 100.

"Heebiejeebies" was released as the album's second single on May 26, 2017. The song features a guest appearance from American singer Kehlani. It was later sent to urban contemporary radio on March 6, 2018.

"Turf" was released on June 16, 2017, as the album's third single. "Wedding Crashers" was released on July 21, 2017, as the album's fourth single. The song features a guest appearance from American rapper Offset.

"Spice Girl" was released on August 15, 2017, to rhythmic contemporary radio as the album's fifth single. The music video for the song was released on October 10, 2017.

=== Promotional singles ===
The album's first promotional single, "Blinds", was released on June 30, 2017.

== Critical reception ==
Professional ratings
Aggregate scores
Source	Rating
AnyDecentMusic?	6.9/10
Metacritic	77/100
Review scores
Source	Rating
AllMusic	3.5/5 stars
The A.V. Club	B
Exclaim!	7/10
Gig Soup	74%
HipHopDX	4.1/5
HotNewHipHop	74%
Pitchfork	7.3/10
Sputnikmusic	3.4/5
XXL	3/5

Good for You was met with generally positive reviews. At Metacritic, which assigns a normalized rating out of 100 to reviews from mainstream publications, the album received an average score of 77, based on four reviews. Aggregator AnyDecentMusic? gave it 6.9 out of 10, based on their assessment of the critical consensus.

Aaron McKrell of HipHopDX gave a positive review, stating "This debut shines so brightly in comparison to what Aminé's contemporaries are passing off that it may be easy to forget that it is not exactly a groundbreaking album. Regardless, the rookie should be commended for crafting an honest, entertaining and revealing album". Briana Younger of Pitchfork wrote: "Good for You, most of which hinge on love interests old and new, underscored by a playful outlook that's channeled into bubbly, off-center production. It's far from serious but stops just short of turn-up—more like the soundtrack for an almost-sober drive home." A. Harmony of Exclaim! said, "Even in its weighty moments, the simple melodies, infectious hooks and liberal dashes of humour will keep your spirits up from start to finish. Good for You is a satisfying, well-rounded effort". Andrew Colvert of Gig Soup praised the album, stating, "Even if he's not the most gifted creatively right now, he's still in his early 20s and doesn't confine himself to just hip hop for inspiration. The future looks as bright as the colors on his album cover".

Writing for Sputnikmusic, Elliott S. Edwards concluded, "Good for You isn't a pleasant listen because Aminé is so gosh darn happy, it's because it appears so out of step with a relentlessly negative and dour mood. We could all do with just that much more happiness in our lives". Preezy of XXL said, "Good for You proves his meteoric rise up the charts is far from the start of the ending and more of precursor of what's to come. His versatility shines as he offers feel-good moments with more thought-provoking material".

== Commercial performance ==
Good for You debuted at number 31 on the US Billboard 200, selling 13,000 copies pure sales in its first week. On January 24, 2023, the album was certified platinum by the Recording Industry Association of America (RIAA) for combined sales and album-equivalent units of over 1,000,000 units in the United States.

== Track listing ==
Good for You track listing
No.	Title	Writer(s)	Producer(s)	Length
1.	"Veggies" (featuring Ty Dolla Sign)	Adam Daniel; Tyrone Griffin, Jr.; Jaren Walker; Jahaan Sweet; Irvin Mejia	Sweet; Pasqué	3:23
2.	"Yellow" (featuring Nelly)	Daniel; Chester Hansen; Adam Feeney; Leland Wayne; Shane Lindstrom	Frank Dukes; Metro Boomin; Murda Beatz^{[a]}	2:59
3.	"Caroline"	Daniel; Mejia	Aminé; Pasqué	3:29
4.	"Hero"	Daniel; Mejia; Harmony Tividad; Cleo Tucker	Aminé; Pasqué; Girlpool^{[b]}; Jay Prince^{[b]}	3:13
5.	"Spice Girl"	Daniel; Feeney; Julian Gramma; Victoria Beckham^{[c]}; Melanie Brown^{[c]}; Emma Bunton^{[c]}; Melanie Chisholm^{[c]}; Geraldine Halliwell^{[c]}; Matt Rowe^{[c]}; Richard Stannard^{[c]}	Frank Dukes; J Gramm^{[b]}	2:53
6.	"STFU"	Daniel; Joseph Thornalley	Aminé; Vegyn	3:25
7.	"Wedding Crashers" (featuring Offset)	Daniel; Kiari Cephus; Gramma; Geoffrey Earley; Feeney	J Gramm; Aminé^{[a]}; Geoffro Cause^{[a]}; Frank Dukes^{[b]}	3:49
8.	"Sundays"	Daniel; Kaan Gunesberk; Feeney	Frank Dukes	4:07
9.	"Turf"	Daniel; James Ho	Malay	4:25
10.	"Blinds"	Daniel; Howard Lawrence; Guy Lawrence	G. Lawrence	1:26
11.	"Dakota" (featuring Charlie Wilson)	Daniel; Ho; Mejia	Malay; Pasqué	3:45
12.	"Slide"	Daniel; Walker; Sweet	Aminé; Sweet	2:49
13.	"Money"	Daniel; Mejia	Aminé; Pasqué	4:16
14.	"Beach Boy"	Daniel; Feeney; Mejia	Frank Dukes; Pasqué^{[b]}	4:43
15.	"Heebiejeebies" (featuring Kehlani) (bonus track)	Daniel; Kehlani Parrish; Sean Rhoden; Sweet	Sweet	3:40
Total length:				52:22

Notes

- ^{^[a]} signifies a co-producer
- ^{^[b]} signifies an additional producer

Sample credits

- ^{^[c]} "Spice Girl" contains a sample from "Wannabe" written by Victoria Beckham, Melanie Brown, Emma Bunton, Melanie Chisholm, Geraldine Halliwell, Matt Rowe and Richard Stannard, as performed by Spice Girls.

== Personnel ==
Performers

- Aminé – primary artist
- Ty Dolla Sign – featured artist (track 1)
- Nelly – featured artist (track 2)
- Offset – featured artist (track 7)
- Charlie Wilson – featured artist (track 11), background vocals (track 9), additional vocals (track 1)
- Kehlani – featured artist (track 15)
- Marche' Black – background vocals (track 3)
- Girlpool – additional vocals (track 4), background vocals (track 14)
- Sheron Page – additional vocals (track 6)
- Leon Bridges – additional vocals (track 8)
- Illegal Civilization – background vocals (track 14)

Musicians

- Chuck Palmer – conductor, string arranger (track 1)
- Dave Eggar – cello, string arranger (tracks 1, 11)
- Rachel Golub – violin (tracks 1, 11)
- Jessica Meyer – viola (tracks 1, 11)
- Tony Maceli – bass (tracks 1, 11)

Technical

- Morning Estrada – recording engineer (tracks 1, 2, 4–6, 8–10, 12, 14), mixer (tracks 6, 12, 15)
- Jaycen Joshua – mixer (tracks 1, 4, 5, 7, 13, 14)
- David Nakaji – assistant mixer (tracks 1, 4, 7, 13)
- Iván Jiménez – assistant mixer (tracks 1, 4, 7, 13)
- Alex Tumay – mixer (track 2)
- Gordie Tumay – assistant mixer (track 2)
- Aminé – recording engineer (tracks 3, 13)
- Gabe Schuman – mixer (track 3)
- Daryl "DJ Durel" McPherson – recording engineer (track 7)
- Manny Marroquin – mixer (tracks 8, 9), mixing engineer (track 11)
- Chris Galland – mixing engineer (tracks 8, 9, 11)
- Robin Florent – assistant mixer (tracks 8, 9, 11)
- Scott Desmarais – assistant mixer (tracks 8, 9, 11)
- Guy Lawrence – recording engineer (track 10)
- Ryan Gladieux – recording engineer (track 15)

Production

- Jahaan Sweet – producer (tracks 1, 12, 15)
- Pasqué – producer (tracks 1, 3, 4, 11, 13), additional producer (track 14)
- Frank Dukes – producer (tracks 2, 5, 8, 14), additional producer (track 7)
- Metro Boomin – producer (track 2)
- Murda Beatz – co-producer (track 2)
- Aminé – producer (tracks 3, 4, 6, 12, 13), co-producer (track 7)
- Girlpool – additional producer (track 4)
- Jay Prince – additional producer (track 4)
- J Gramm – additional producer (track 5), producer (track 7)
- Vegyn – producer (track 6)
- Geoffro Cause – co-producer (track 7)
- Malay – producer (tracks 9, 11)
- Guy Lawrence – producer (track 10)

== Charts ==
Chart performance for Good for You
Chart (2017)	Peak position
Canadian Albums (Billboard)	59
New Zealand Heatseekers Albums (RMNZ)	3
US Billboard 200	31
US Top R&B/Hip-Hop Albums (Billboard)	19

== Certifications ==
Certifications for Good for You
Region	Certification	Certified units/sales
New Zealand (RMNZ)	Platinum	15,000^{‡}
United States (RIAA)	Platinum	1,000,000^{‡}
^{‡} Sales+streaming figures based on certification alone.
