= Mid90s =

2018 coming-of-age film by Jonah Hill

- Theatrical release poster
- Directed by: Jonah Hill
- Written by: Jonah Hill
- Produced by: Scott Rudin; Eli Bush; Ken Kao; Jonah Hill; Lila Yacoub
- Starring: Sunny Suljic; Lucas Hedges; Na-Kel Smith; Olan Prenatt; Gio Galicia; Ryder McLaughlin; Alexa Demie; Katherine Waterston
- Cinematography: Christopher Blauvelt
- Edited by: Nick Houy
- Music by: Trent Reznor; Atticus Ross
- Production companies: A24; Waypoint Entertainment; Scott Rudin Productions
- Distributed by: A24
- Release dates: September 9, 2018 (TIFF); October 19, 2018 (United States)
- Running time: 85 minutes
- Country: United States
- Language: English
- Budget: $1.7 million
- Box office: $9.3 million

Mid90s (stylized as mid90s) is a 2018 American coming-of-age comedy-drama film written and directed by Jonah Hill, in his feature directorial debut. The plot follows Stevie, a 13-year-old boy in 1990s Los Angeles. To escape a troubled home life, he begins spending time with an older group of skateboarders. The cast includes Sunny Suljic, Lucas Hedges, Na-Kel Smith, Alexa Demie, and Katherine Waterston.

Mid90s served as a passion project for Jonah Hill, who was inspired by his experiences growing up in Los Angeles in the 1990s. Influenced by filmmakers like Martin Scorsese and Spike Jonze, Hill aimed to authentically portray 1990s skate culture. Filming took place in various Los Angeles neighborhoods. Mid90s was filmed with a 4:3 aspect ratio reminiscent of VHS skate tapes, using Super 16mm film stock to emulate 1990s skate videos. The soundtrack featured 1990s hip hop music, punk and alternative rock.

The film had its world premiere at the Toronto International Film Festival on September 9, 2018, and was released theatrically in the United States on October 19, 2018, by A24. It was well received by critics, who called it a "promising first outing for Hill", and praised the sense of nostalgia. It grossed $9.3 million at the box office on a budget of $1.7 million.

== Plot ==
In 1996, 13-year-old Stevie lives in Los Angeles with his physically abusive older brother Ian and single mother Dabney. One day, Stevie bikes past Motor Avenue Skateshop, admires the boastful camaraderie of the skateboarders outside, and returns the following day. Back home, he trades with his brother for a skateboard, brings it to the shop and befriends young skater Ruben, who introduces him to the rest of the group: charismatic leader Ray, loudmouth "Fuckshit", and quiet "Fourth Grade". Although an inexperienced skater, Stevie is drawn to the group and aspires to imitate their daredevil behavior and anti-social attitudes. Stevie is nicknamed "Sunburn" by Ray, and his acceptance into the group causes Ruben to resent him.

While attempting a skateboard trick between two rooftops, Stevie falls and suffers a head injury. Dabney's concerns are dismissed by Stevie, who continues to admire the group. Later, Ian has a tense standoff with Fuckshit as Stevie watches, but Ian appears intimidated by the group and leaves. Stevie begins smoking, drinking, and experimenting with marijuana. At a party, he has his first kiss and sexual experience with an older teenage girl named Estee. After Stevie comes home intoxicated, he and Ian get into a violent fight. Ian has an emotional breakdown when Stevie says that he has no friends and, following the conflict, a distressed Stevie attempts to asphyxiate himself with a cord from a SNES controller, one of several self-harm incidents. The next day, Dabney forbids Stevie from hanging out with the boys. Stevie lashes out and refuses to obey.

Having alienated his family, Stevie sits alone behind the skate shop. Ray consoles Stevie, telling him even though he thinks his life is bad, the other boys have it worse: Fourth Grade is extremely poor to the point of not being able to afford socks, Ruben's mother is an abusive drug addict, Fuckshit's reckless partying is worsening, and Ray lost his younger brother, who was hit by a car a few years prior. Ray takes Stevie out to skate at night, and they fall asleep outside the Santa Monica Courthouse.

The shop hosts a party in the back of the store. Ray hopes to make a career in skating and chats up two professionals as potential sponsors, but Fuckshit embarrasses him in front of the pros and Stevie is provoked into a brawl with Ruben. Discouraged, Ray tells everyone to go home. However, an intoxicated Fuckshit insists on driving the group to another party. Talking animatedly and driving inattentively, Fuckshit crashes and flips the car on its side. Stevie is knocked unconscious and is rushed to the hospital.

Stevie later awakens in a hospital bed, and sees Ian in a chair alongside him. Ian gives Stevie a container of orange juice to comfort him. Dabney enters the hospital and sees Stevie's friends asleep in the waiting room. Dabney encourages them to visit Stevie's room. After a while, Fourth Grade, who has been filming their adventures, says he has something to show them. He plugs his camera into a TV to play them a skate video of their daily activities. Fourth Grade has titled the film Mid90s.

== Cast ==
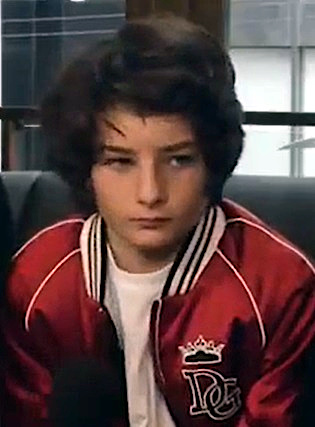
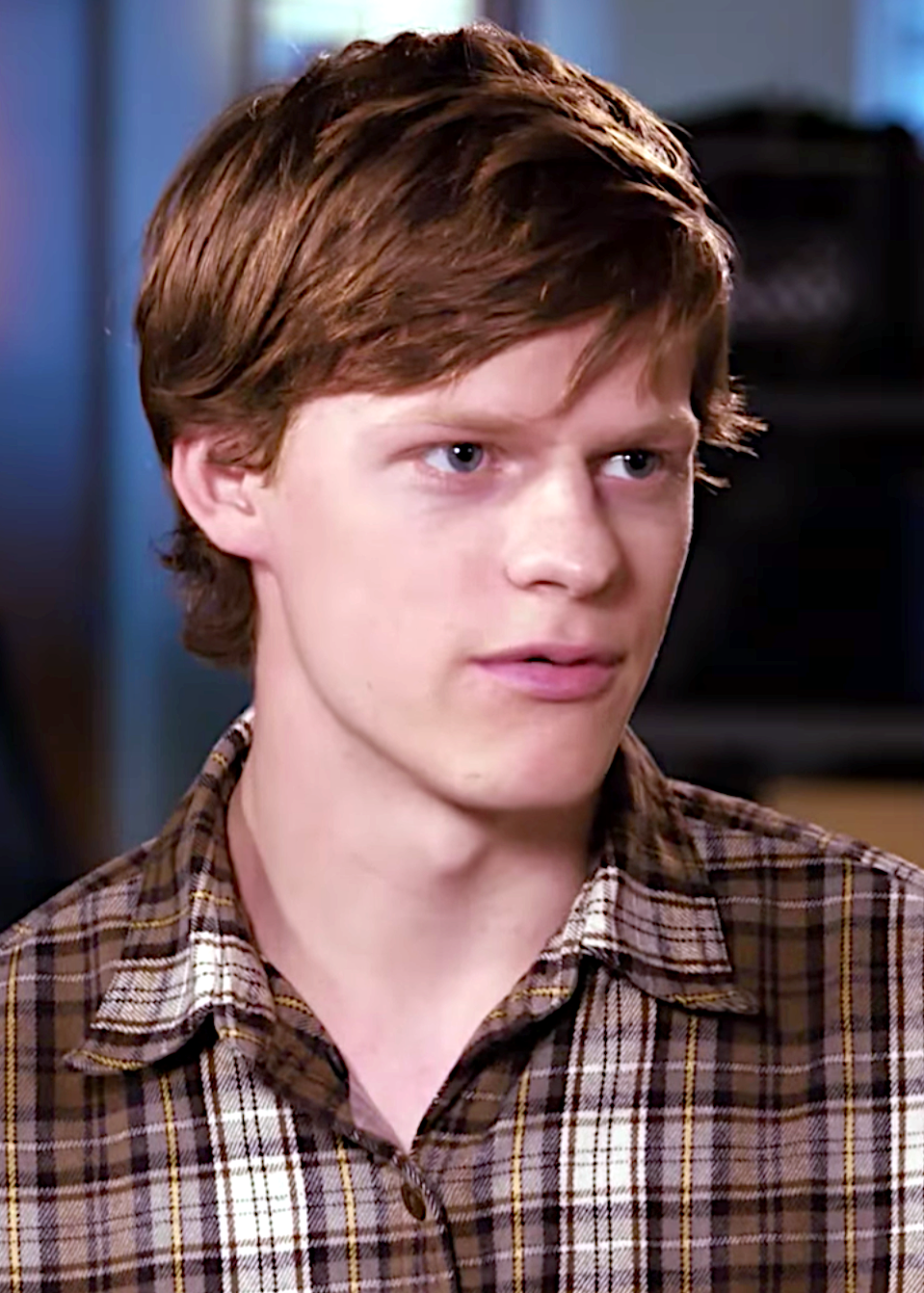
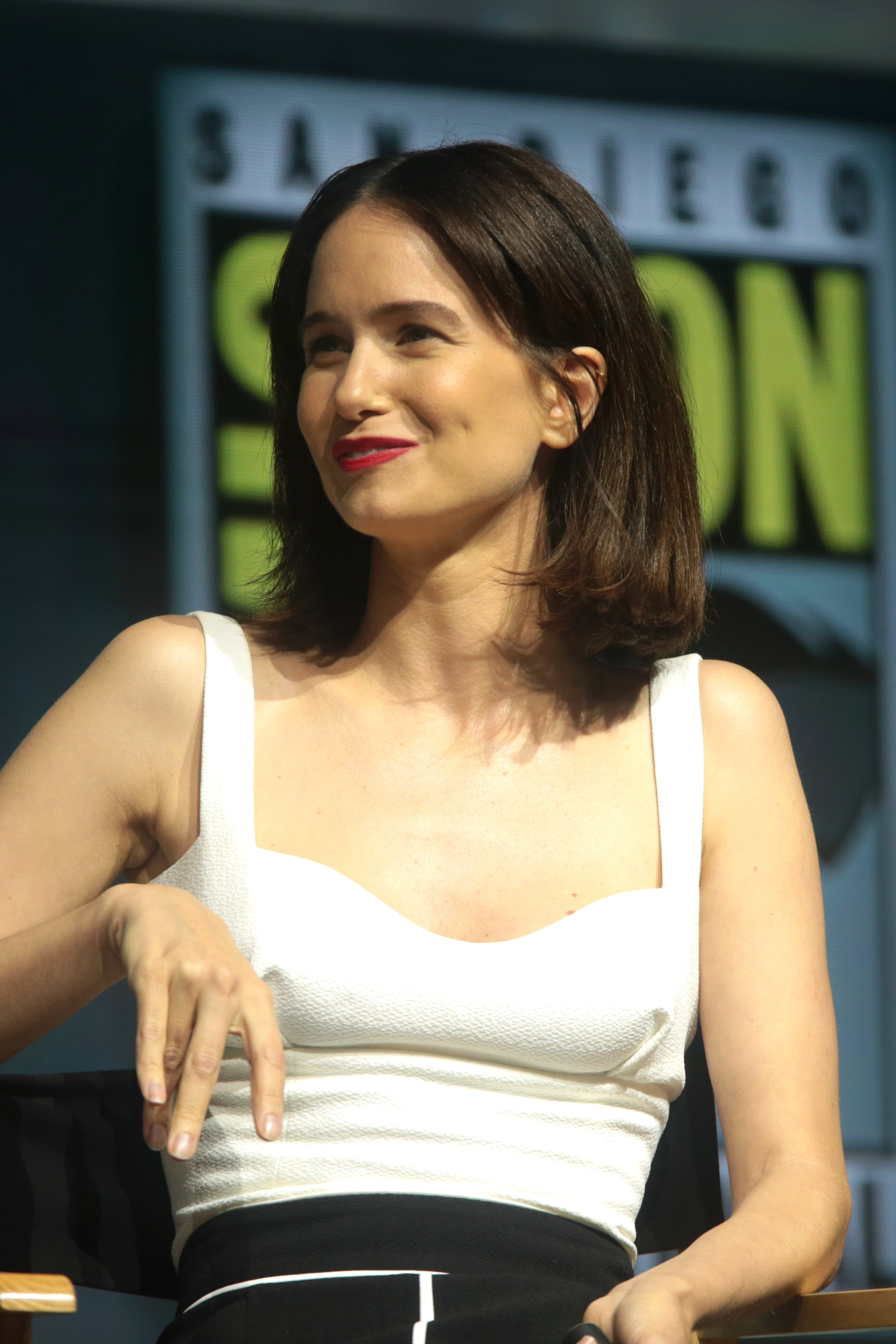
(L to R) Sunny Suljic (pictured in 2018), Lucas Hedges (2017), and Katherine Waterston (2018)
- Sunny Suljic as Stevie "Sunburn"
- Lucas Hedges as Ian, Stevie's abusive older brother
- Na-Kel Smith as Ray
- Olan Prenatt as Fuckshit
- Gio Galicia as Ruben
- Ryder McLaughlin as Fourth Grade
- Alexa Demie as Estee
- Katherine Waterston as Dabney, Ian and Stevie's mother
- Del the Funky Homosapien as Homeless Man No. 1
- Chad Muska as Homeless Man No. 2
- Harmony Korine as Todd (a sexual partner of Dabney)

Additionally, Jerrod Carmichael makes an uncredited cameo as a security guard whom Stevie and his friends taunt.

== Production ==
=== Development and casting ===
Mid90s was Jonah Hill's first project as a writer and director, a passion project drawn from his own experiences growing up in Los Angeles. Influenced by filmmakers like Martin Scorsese and Spike Jonze, Hill sought to create an authentic portrayal of 1990s skate culture and the experience of youth at that time. Hill consulted Jonze, who encouraged him to create something personal. On March 30, 2016, it was announced that Jonah Hill would be making his directorial debut from his own spec script, Mid90s, a film he would not appear in. In March 2017, Lucas Hedges joined the cast. In July 2017, it was reported that Katherine Waterston had signed on and that Sunny Suljic was cast in the lead role. It was also revealed that principal production on the film had commenced. On August 1, 2017, Alexa Demie joined the cast.

=== Filming and music ===
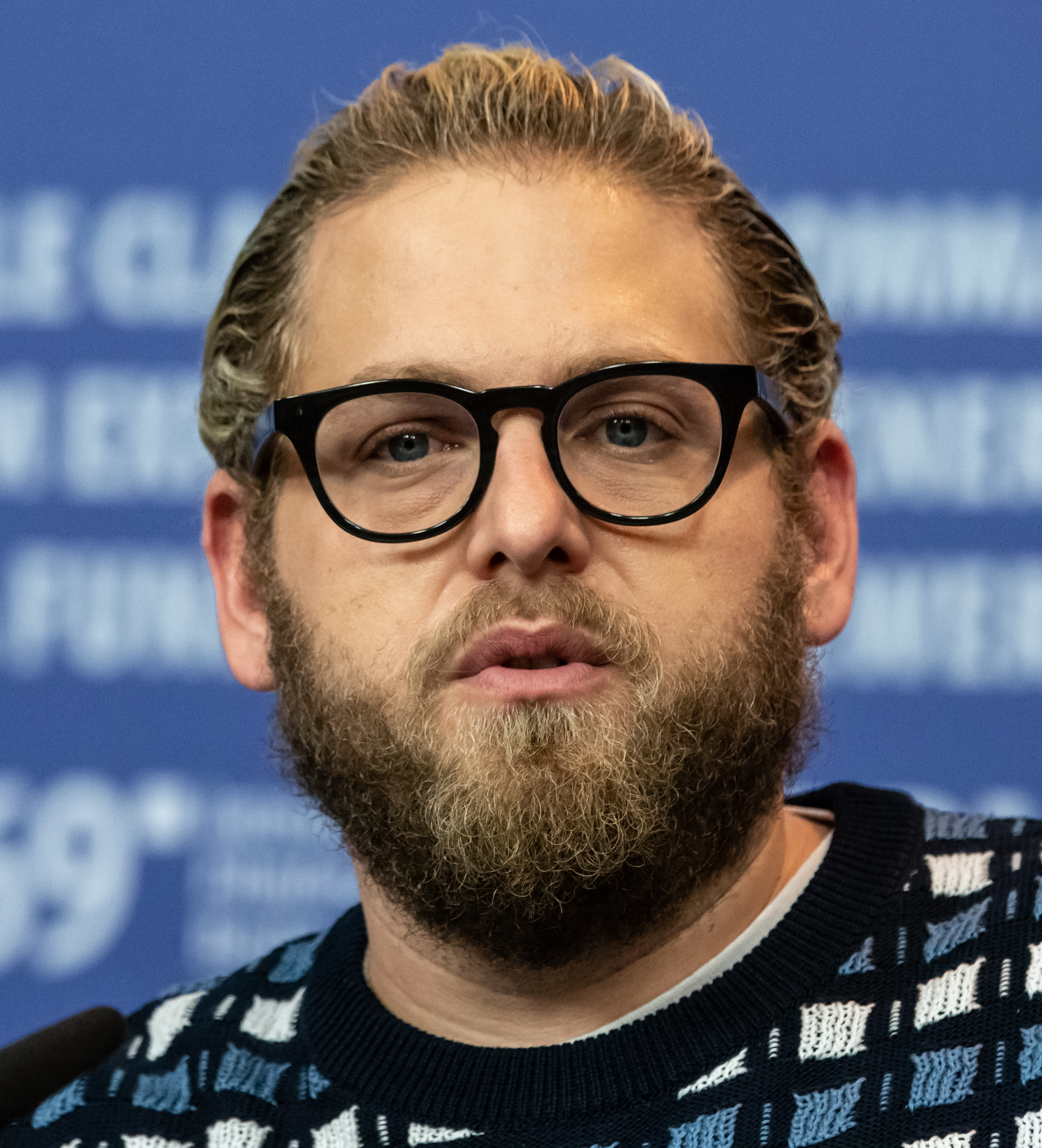
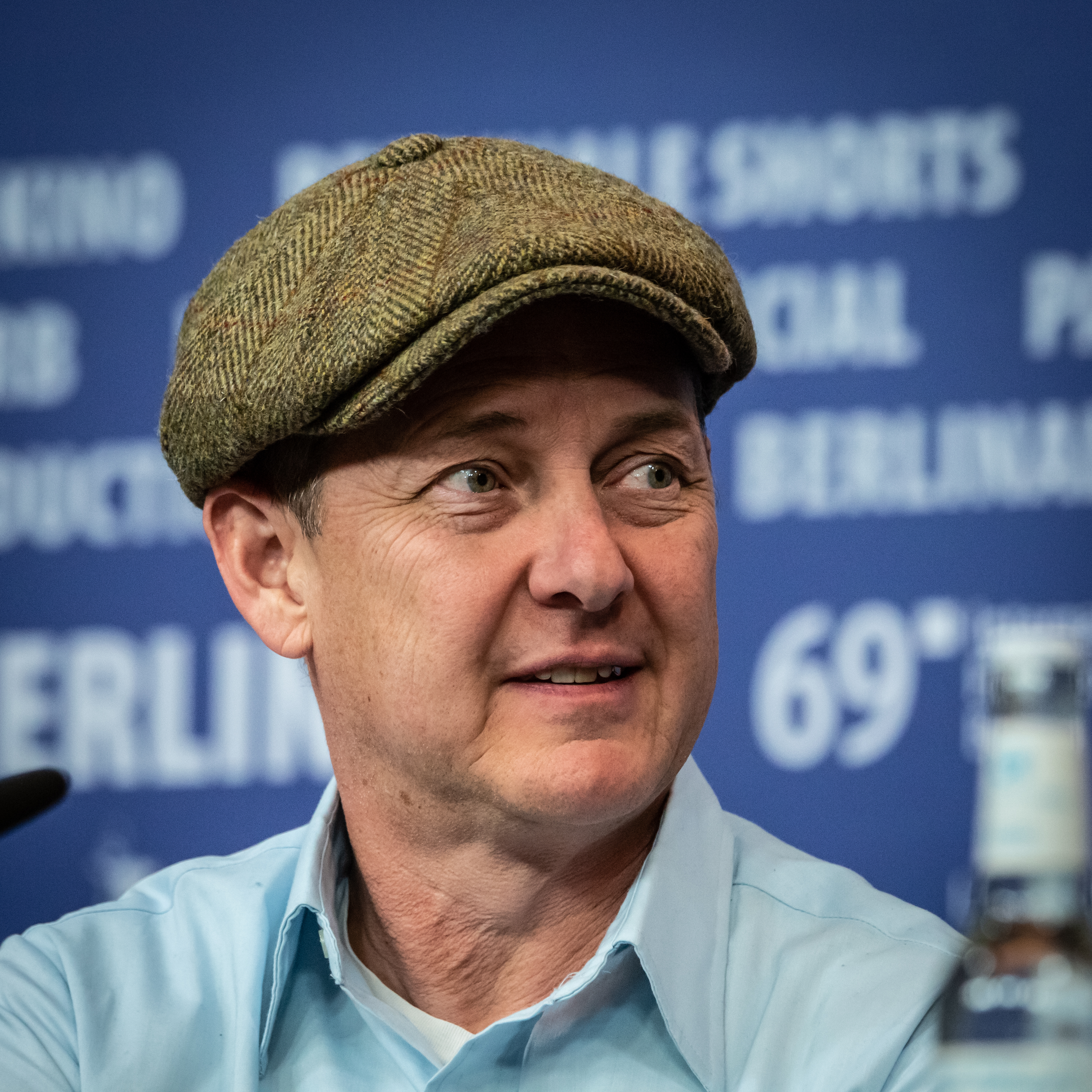
Jonah Hill (left) and Christopher Blauvelt (right) at the 69th Berlin International Film Festival in 2019

The set design recreated the director's childhood experiences. For example, Stevie's room started out messy with posters of Teenage Mutant Ninja Turtles, but was later changed to reflect his new individuality. To familiarize themselves with the time period, some cast members listened to songs from the 1990s on an iPod. Mid90s was shot in various Los Angeles locations, including Venice and Culver City. Hill and cinematographer Christopher Blauvelt employed a 4:3 aspect ratio to echo the look of VHS skate tapes. Filming with Super 16mm stock matched the aesthetic of skate videos. Although some of the cast members were actors, Hill used real-life skateboarders who had little acting history. Hill collaborated with editor Nick Houy in editing.

Mid90s features an original score by Trent Reznor and Atticus Ross, as well as recordings by Pixies, Morrissey, Herbie Hancock, ESG, the Mamas and the Papas, Souls of Mischief, Nirvana, the Pharcyde, Misfits, Bad Brains and various 1990s hip hop music.

== Release ==
Mid90s had its world premiere at the Toronto International Film Festival on September 9, 2018, and was also screened at the New York Film Festival on October 7, 2018. It was released in select theaters in the United States on October 19, 2018, with a wide release the following weekend. The film was released in UK and Irish cinemas on April 12, 2019.

=== Home media ===
Mid90s was released on DVD and Blu-ray on January 8, 2019. The film made $480,000 in DVD sales and $470,000 in Blu-ray sales.

== Reception ==
=== Box office ===
Mid90s grossed $249,500 from four theaters in its opening weekend for an average of $62,375 per venue, good for the third best of 2018. It expanded to 1,206 theaters the following week and made $3 million, finishing 10th at the box office. In its third weekend of release the film made $1.36 million. The box office closed, grossing $9.3 million.

=== Critical response ===
On review aggregator Rotten Tomatoes, the film holds an approval rating of 81% based on 228 reviews, with an average rating of 7.1/10. The website's critical consensus reads, "Mid90s tells a clear-eyed yet nostalgic coming-of-age tale that might mark the start of an auspicious new career for debuting writer-director Jonah Hill." On Metacritic, the film has a weighted average score of 66 out of 100, based on 45 critics, indicating "generally favorable reviews". Audiences polled by PostTrak gave the film an 83% overall positive score and a 62% "definite recommend".

Owen Gleiberman of Variety called the film "a coming-of-age tale that's unvarnished enough to believe," specifying, "the fact that a star like Hill built this movie from the ground up, and did it with so much integrity and flair, lends it an undeniable hipster quotient." Writing for The Hollywood Reporter, John DeFore said, "in emotional punch and shoulda-seen-this-coming skill, it is more like Hill's Lady Bird, a gem that feels simultaneously informed by its author's adolescence and the product of a serious artist's observational distance." Michael Phillips of the Chicago Tribune gave the film 2 out of 4 stars and said, "Vivid in bits and pieces, Mid90s feels like a research scrapbook for a movie, not a movie. The more Hill throws you around in the name of creating a harsh, immediate impression, the more the impressions blur."

Connore Lagore of Vox Magazine said, "But despite some stop-and-go moments between the highest highs and the lowest lows, Hill crafts Mid90s into an ultimately charming nostalgia trip." Liam Gaughan of Collider connected Mid90s with mental health struggles associated with youth. Gaughan noted the ending ambiguous note of Mid90s, saying, "This was perhaps the best decision Hill could have made on his first feature". Sarah Fingerhood of the 34th Street made connections of the actors and the attitudes of their characters, concluding, "Mid90s is Jonah Hill's debut as a director and what a startling debut it is; a visually beautiful and carefully crafted film that has a timeless message to all those that see it."

Some critical reviews called attention to the film's use of homophobic and racist slurs, as well as its treatment of toxic masculinity. Sam Adams of Slate wrote, "The skaters' dialogue is liberally spiced with homophobic and occasional racist slurs, and while anyone old enough to remember the 1990s can attest to the accuracy of their omnipresence, the movie's inclusion of them feels like another cheap shortcut to verisimilitude." Other criticisms cited a scene of juvenile sexuality between Stevie and Estee for its uncomfortable undertones given the ages of the characters and actors. In response, Hill commented, "The point of the movie is that nothing's black or white. I'm not a moralist; I'm not here to tell an audience how they should feel."

=== Accolades ===
Award	Category	Subject	Result	Ref.
Berlin International Film Festival	Teddy Award for Best Feature Film	Jonah Hill	Nominated	
Critics' Choice Movie Award	Best Young Performer	Sunny Suljic	Nominated	
Independent Spirit Award	Best Editing	Nick Houy	Nominated	
NBR Award	Top Ten Independent Films		Won	
