= To All the Boys (franchise) =

Romance film series

- Official franchise logo
- Created by: Jenny Han
- Original work: To All the Boys I've Loved Before by Jenny Han
- Owner: Netflix
- Years: 2018–present

To All the Boys is a franchise consisting of American teenage romance installments, including three feature films and a spin-off television series, based on the titular trilogy of novels written by Jenny Han. Starring Lana Condor and Noah Centineo in the central roles, the plot centers around Lara Jean Song-Covey (Condor), a shy teenager who writes five letters—the ones she never planned to send—to boys that she has had crushes on. The films show her experiences after the letters are received by the young men.

The series is produced by Netflix and released exclusively through its streaming service. The first film, released in 2018 was critically acclaimed, and became one of the company's most-viewed original films. Following its success, Netflix quickly began developing the two sequels, released in 2020 and 2021 respectively, both of which received positive reviews from critics.

The franchise is continuing with a spin-off television series, centered around Kitty Song-Covey, which was released in 2023.

== Origin ==
The book To All the Boys I've Loved Before was published in April 2014, and spent 40 weeks as a New York Times Best Selling young adult romance novel. By June 2014, the novel's film adaptation rights were purchased by Overbrook Entertainment, the production company owned by Will Smith and James Lassiter.

The second installment, P.S. I Still Love You, was released in May 2015, and five weeks on The New York Times Best Seller list, peaking sales at #2 in the Young Adult fiction section. The third installment, Always and Forever, Lara Jean, was released in May 2017.

== Films ==
Film	U.S. release date	Director	Screenwriter(s)	Producer(s)
To All the Boys I've Loved Before	August 17, 2018	Susan Johnson	Sofia Alvarez	Dougie Cash, Jordan Levin & Matthew Kaplan
To All the Boys: P.S. I Still Love You	February 12, 2020	Michael Fimognari	Sofia Alvarez & J. Mills Goodloe	Matthew Kaplan
To All the Boys: Always and Forever	February 12, 2021	Michael Fimognari	Katie Lovejoy	Matthew Kaplan

=== To All the Boys I've Loved Before (2018) ===
Film rights were attained in June 2014, with Susan Johnson serving as director from a screenplay by Sofia Alvarez. Lana Condor was cast to star as Lara Jean Song-Covey. Noah Centineo was cast to co-star, with the rest of the film's roles the following month. Production took place in Vancouver, British Columbia, Canada, and Portland, Oregon, USA. Photography took place from July 5, 2017, to August 4, 2017.

To All the Boys I've Loved Before was released exclusively on Netflix on August 17, 2018.

=== To All the Boys: P.S. I Still Love You (2020) ===
Following the success of the first film, Netflix, Paramount Pictures and Awesomeness Films began to discuss a sequel. The film was greenlit by December 2018, with Condor and Centineo signed to reprise their roles. By March 2019, Michael Fimognari, cinematographer on the first film, was hired to make his directorial debut. Director of the first film, Susan Johnson, will serve as executive producer. Jordan Fisher was cast as John Ambrose McClaren, a past love of Lara Jean's who joins the project, and complicates the two main characters' relationship.

Filming took place once more in Vancouver, British Columbia, Canada and lasted from March 27, 2019, to May 10, 2019. To All the Boys: P.S. I Still Love You, was released exclusively on Netflix on February 12, 2020.

=== To All the Boys: Always and Forever (2021) ===
In August 2019, a third film was announced to be in development with confirmation that it was already into production. The feature adapts the author's third novel, with Fimognari once again serving as director, with a script by Katie Lovejoy.

Production was announced to have officially begun on July 15, 2019, two months after production on the second film wrapped. To All the Boys: Always and Forever was released exclusively on Netflix on February 12, 2021. The film was retitled from its tentative title, synonymous with the name of the novel.

== Television ==
Series	Season	Episodes	Originally released	Network	Showrunner	Writers	Executive producers
XO, Kitty	1	10	May 18, 2023	Netflix	Jenny Han	Jenny Han, Siobhan Vivian, Alanna Bennett, Emily Kim, Sarah Choi, Hanna Stanbridge, Chris Martin, Jessica O'Toole, Sascha Rothchild	Matthew Kaplan, Jenny Han, Sascha Rothchild
XO, Kitty	2	8	January 16, 2025	Netflix	Jenny Han	Jenny Han, Siobhan Vivian, Alanna Bennett, Emily Kim, Sarah Choi, Hanna Stanbridge, Chris Martin, Jessica O'Toole, Sascha Rothchild	Matthew Kaplan, Jenny Han, Sascha Rothchild
XO, Kitty	3	8	April 2, 2026	Netflix	Jenny Han	Jenny Han, Siobhan Vivian, Alanna Bennett, Emily Kim, Sarah Choi, Hanna Stanbridge, Chris Martin, Jessica O'Toole, Sascha Rothchild	Matthew Kaplan, Jenny Han, Sascha Rothchild

In April 2021, a spin-off series featuring the character Kitty Song-Covey, was announced to be in development as a Netflix exclusive. Anna Cathcart reprises her role in the series, with a story centered around her wanting to learn more about her late mother and the school she attended in Seoul. Jenny Han serves as the show's creator, writer, showrunner, and executive producer. The pilot episode will be co-written by Han and Siobhan Vivian. The series is intended to include 30-minute romantic comedy episodes. The project will be a joint-venture production between Awesomeness TV, ACE Entertainment, and Netflix Original Series.

In October 2021, the series entered production and was officially ordered by Netflix with the title XO, Kitty. The plot will center around Kitty Song-Covey, who sees herself as an expert matchmaker and thinks she has love figured out. Once she moves to South Korea to reunite with her long-distance boyfriend, she later discovers that she has a lot to learn about friendship and romance. Han and Sascha Rothchild will serve as co-showrunners, in addition to serving as an executive producers with Matt Kaplan.

== Cast and characters ==
List indicators

This section includes characters who will appear or have appeared in more than two films in the series.

- An empty grey cell indicates the character was not in the film, or that the character's official presence has not yet been confirmed.
- ^{A} indicates an appearance through archival footage or audio.
- ^{C} indicates a cameo role.
- ^{G} indicates a guest appearance in the season.
- ^{Y} indicates a younger version of the character.

Character	Films			Television		
Character	To All the Boys I've Loved Before	To All the Boys: P.S. I Still Love You	To All the Boys: Always and Forever	XO, Kitty		
Character	To All the Boys I've Loved Before	To All the Boys: P.S. I Still Love You	To All the Boys: Always and Forever	Season 1	Season 2	Season 3
Character	2018	2020	2021	2023	2025	2026
Lara Jean Song-Covey	Lana Condor Isabelle Beech^{Y}	Lana Condor Momona Tamada^{Y}	Lana Condor Momona Tamada^{Y}	Lana Condor^{A}		Lana Condor^{G}
Peter Kavinsky	Noah Centineo Hunter Dillon^{Y}	Noah Centineo	Noah Centineo	Noah Centineo^{A}	Noah Centineo^{G}	
Katherine "Kitty" Song-Covey	Anna Cathcart	Anna Cathcart	Anna Cathcart	Anna Cathcart	Anna Cathcart	Anna Cathcart
Margot Song-Covey	Janel Parrish	Janel Parrish	Janel Parrish		Janel Parrish^{G}	
Daniel "Dan" Covey	John Corbett	John Corbett	John Corbett	John Corbett^{G}		
Genevieve "Gen" Mitchell	Emilija Baranac Rhys Fleming^{Y}	Emilija Baranac	Emilija Baranac			
Lucas James	Trezzo Mahoro	Trezzo Mahoro	Trezzo Mahoro			
Christine "Chris" Donati	Madeleine Arthur	Madeleine Arthur	Madeleine Arthur			
Emily Nussbaum	Kelcey Mawema	Kelcey Mawema	Kelcey Mawema			
John Ambrose-McClaren	Pavel Piddocke^{Y} Jordan Burtchett^{C}	Jordan Fisher Christian Scott^{Y}				
Trina Rothschild		Sarayu Blue	Sarayu Blue	Sarayu Blue^{G}		
Trevor Pike		Ross Butler	Ross Butler			
Young Ja Song "Grandma"		Ae Yon Han			Ae Yon Han^{G}	
Dae-heon "Dae" Kim			Jeon Ho-young	Choi Min-yeong	Choi Min-yeong	Choi Min-yeong
Quincy "Q" Shabazian				Anthony Keyvan	Anthony Keyvan	Anthony Keyvan
Yuri Han				Gia Kim	Gia Kim	Gia Kim
Min-ho Moon				Sang Heon Lee	Sang Heon Lee	Sang Heon Lee
Alex Finnerty				Peter Thurnwald	Peter Thurnwald	Peter Thurnwald
Juliana Porter				Regan Aliyah	Regan Aliyah	Regan Aliyah
Professor Daniel Lee				Michael K. Lee	Michael K. Lee	Michael K. Lee
Madison Miller				Jocelyn Shelfo	Jocelyn Shelfo	Jocelyn Shelfo
Mr. Kim				Lee Sung-wook	Lee Sung-wook	Lee Sung-wook
Mihee Yoon				Sunny Oh	Sunny Oh	Sunny Oh
Eunice Kang				Ryu Han-bi	Ryu Han-bi	Ryu Han-bi
Young Moon					Philippe Lee	Philippe Lee
Esther Shim/Stella Cho					Audrey Huynh	
Praveena Bhakti					Sasha Bhasin	Sasha Bhasin
Jintaek "Jin" Lee					Joshua Hyunho Lee	Joshua Hyunho Lee
Jiwon Ahn					Hojo Shin	Hojo Shin

== Additional production and crew details ==
Title	Crew/Detail					
Title	Composer(s)	Cinematographer(s)	Editor(s)	Production companies	Distributing company	Running time
To All the Boys I've Loved Before	Joe Wong	Michael Fimognari	Joe Klotz & Phillip J. Bartell	Awesomeness Films, Netflix Original Films, Overbrook Entertainment, All The Boys Productions	Netflix	1 hr 39 mins
To All the Boys: P.S. I Still Love You	Joe Wong	Michael Fimognari	Joe Klotz	ACE Entertainment, Awesomeness Films, Netflix Original Films, Overbrook Entertainment, All The Boys Productions	Netflix	1 hr 41 mins
To All The Boys: Always and Forever	Joe Wong	Michael Fimognari	Joe Klotz, Tamara Meem & Michelle Harrison	ACE Entertainment, Awesomeness Films, Netflix Original Films, Overbrook Entertainment, All The Boys Productions	Netflix	1 hr 49 mins
XO, Kitty	Jina Hyojin An & Shirley Song	Lindsay George and Sandra Valde-Hansen	Anthony Rosc, Katie Abel, Lindsay Armstrong, Nicole Artzer, Michelle Harrison, and Colin Johnson	Awesomeness TV, ACE Entertainment, Netflix Original Series	Netflix	6 hrs 3 mins (30 mins/episode)

== Critical reception ==
Film	Rotten Tomatoes	Metacritic
To All the Boys I've Loved Before	96% (68 reviews)	64/100 (12 reviews)
To All the Boys: P.S. I Still Love You	75% (71 reviews)	54/100 (16 reviews)
To All the Boys: Always and Forever	78% (68 reviews)	65/100 (18 reviews)
XO, Kitty	82% (28 reviews)	69/100 (10 reviews)
