= To All the Boys I've Loved Before (film) =

2018 film by Susan Johnson

- Official release poster
- Directed by: Susan Johnson
- Written by: Sofia Alvarez
- Based on: To All the Boys I've Loved Before by Jenny Han
- Produced by: Jordan Levin; Matthew Kaplan; Dougie Cash
- Starring: Lana Condor; Noah Centineo; Janel Parrish; Anna Cathcart; Andrew Bachelor; Trezzo Mahoro; Madeleine Arthur; Emilija Baranac; Israel Broussard; John Corbett
- Cinematography: Michael Fimognari
- Edited by: Phillip J. Bartell; Joe Klotz
- Music by: Joe Wong
- Production companies: Overbrook Entertainment; Awesomeness Films
- Distributed by: Netflix
- Release date: August 17, 2018 (United States)
- Running time: 99 minutes
- Country: United States
- Language: English

To All the Boys I've Loved Before is a 2018 American teen romantic comedy film directed by Susan Johnson and written by Sofia Alvarez. The film stars Lana Condor, Noah Centineo, Janel Parrish, Anna Cathcart, Madeleine Arthur, Emilija Baranac, Israel Broussard and John Corbett. The movie is based on Jenny Han's 2014 novel of the same name, and was released by Netflix on August 17, 2018. It received positive reviews from critics, who praised the cast.

It has been the first installment in what is now the To All the Boys film series. It was followed by two sequels, To All the Boys: P.S. I Still Love You, released on February 12, 2020, and To All the Boys: Always and Forever on February 12, 2021. A spin-off series titled XO, Kitty was released on May 18, 2023.

== Plot ==
Shy high school junior Lara Jean Covey writes letters to boys she has strong feelings for before locking them away in her closet. One of the letters regards her childhood friend Josh Sanderson, who dated Lara Jean's older sister Margot until she broke up with him before leaving for college. Lara Jean finds her feelings for Josh resurfacing, but chooses not to pursue him, opting to instead write a postscript to Josh's letter before putting it back in her closet.

One night, Lara Jean falls asleep on the couch while hanging out with her little sister, Kitty, who sneaks into her room and finds her collection of letters. The following Monday at school, Lara Jean is confronted by a former middle school crush, Peter Kavinsky. He explains that he received her letter, causing her to faint. After waking up, she sees Josh approaching with his letter, and in a moment of panic, Lara Jean kisses Peter to throw Josh off before running away.

Lara Jean encounters Lucas, another of the letter recipients, who she learns is gay. She begins to realize that all the letters have been mailed. Lara Jean later leaves her house to avoid both Josh and Peter, but Peter follows her to a diner. She explains her situation and tells him that their kiss was to dissuade Josh.

Peter proposes that he and Lara Jean fake a relationship in order to make his ex-girlfriend Gen jealous, as well as convince Josh that Lara Jean no longer has feelings for him. She agrees after they negotiate the dos and don'ts, and as the next few months go by, the whole school, along with their respective friends and families, believe they are dating.

As Peter and Lara Jean spend more time together, they find themselves conflicted by their developing attraction to each other. Gen expresses her jealousy to Peter, who hesitates to end the relationship with Lara Jean. On the school ski trip, Peter admits his feelings for Lara Jean, and the two end up kissing while alone in a hot tub. At the end of the trip, Gen tells Lara Jean that Peter spent the night in her room after the kiss, then taunts Lara Jean with her favorite scrunchie, which she took from Peter.

Furious, Lara Jean breaks up with Peter and storms home, where she finds Margot has returned from college. Peter arrives, attempting to explain that nothing happened between him and Gen, but Josh arrives as well to confront Peter. Margot overhears everything, and is upset when she learns of Lara Jean's former feelings for Josh. Things are worsened when, after Lara Jean asks Peter and Josh to leave, she sees that a provocative video of her and Peter in the hot tub has been posted on Instagram.

Lara Jean reconciles with Margot, who comforts her. Kitty reveals she was the one who sent the letters. An enraged Lara Jean is calmed down by Margot, who reasons that Lara Jean may have wanted to send the letters but was too afraid to. The sisters forgive each other before getting Instagram to take down the video.

After Christmas break, Lara Jean discovers that her schoolmates have discovered the video, and theorizes that Gen posted it. When she confronts her, Gen admits she tried to sabotage their relationship as she felt betrayed that Lara Jean kissed Peter during a spin the bottle game four years ago.

After talking with her dad and her best friend Chris, Lara Jean reevaluates her relationships and reconciles her friendship with Josh. When she hesitates to tell Peter about her real feelings, Kitty shows her notes that he wrote during their 'relationship'. Lara Jean goes to see him, and he tells her that he is in love with her. They kiss before walking off together.

In a mid-credits scene, John Ambrose McClaren, one of the five recipients of Lara Jean's letters, arrives at her door with flowers in hand.

== Cast and characters ==
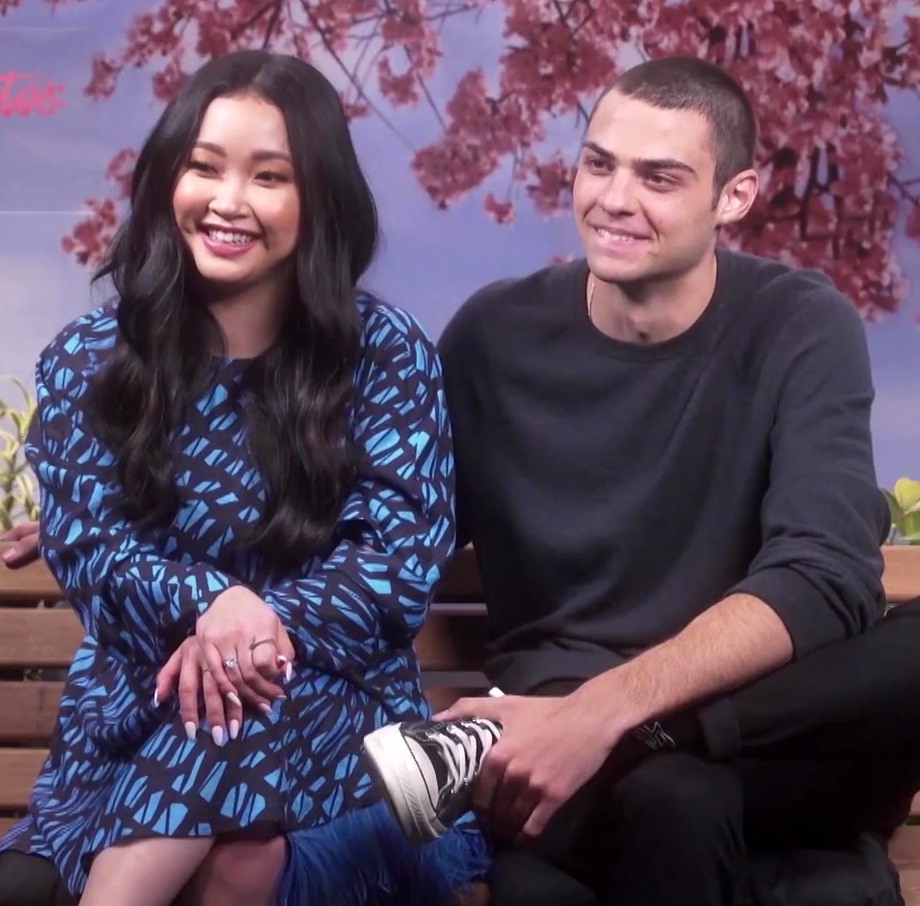
The leading actors Lana Condor (left) and Noah Centineo (right).

- Lana Condor as Lara Jean Song-Covey
  - Isabelle Beech as young Lara Jean.
- Noah Centineo as Peter Kavinsky, one of Lara Jean's love letter recipients.
  - Hunter Dillon as young Peter
- Janel Parrish as Margot Song-Covey, Lara Jean's older sister and Josh's ex-girlfriend.
- Anna Cathcart as Kitty Song-Covey, Lara Jean's younger sister
- Andrew Bachelor as Greg, Peter's friend
- Trezzo Mahoro as Lucas James, a friend of Lara Jean's and one of her former crushes
- Madeleine Arthur as Christine "Chris" Donati, Genevieve's cousin and Lara Jean's best friend
- Emilija Baranac as Genevieve "Gen" Mitchell, Peter's ex-girlfriend and Lara Jean's former best friend in middle school
  - Rhys Fleming as young Gen
- Israel Broussard as Josh Sanderson, Margot's ex-boyfriend and one of Lara Jean's former loves
  - Christian Michael Cooper as young Josh
- John Corbett as Dr. Daniel Covey, Lara Jean's widowed father
- Kelcey Mawema as Emily, a friend of Gen's
- Julia Benson as Ms. Kavinsky, Peter's mother
- Joey Pacheco as Owen, Peter's younger brother
- Edward Kewin as Kenny, one of Lara Jean's love letter recipients
- Jordan Burtchett as John Ambrose McClaren, one of Lara Jean's love letter recipients
  - Pavel Piddocke as young John
- June R. Wilde as Joan, a waitress at the diner Lara Jean hangs out in

== Production ==
=== Development ===
The adaptation process began with an emphasis on preserving Lara Jean's inner voice, which is central to the novel. In June 2014, author Jenny Han's New York Times Best Selling young adult romance novel To All the Boys I've Loved Before was optioned by Will Smith and James Lassiter's production company Overbrook Entertainment. At that time, writer Annie Neal had been hired to adapt the book for the screen. On July 5, 2017, production began in Vancouver, British Columbia. It was announced later that month that Lana Condor had been cast in the leading role of Lara Jean Song Covey, with Susan Johnson directing from a screenplay by Sofia Alvarez. It was also reported that John Corbett, Janel Parrish, Anna Cathcart, Noah Centineo, Israel Broussard, and Andrew Bachelor had joined the cast of the film. One of the biggest challenges during the adaptation process, according to author Jenny Han, was keeping the tone of first-person narration. Instead of depending on heightened drama, the filmmakers wanted to keep the story based on typical teenage experiences. According to Han, the adaptation's casting of an Asian-American actress as Lara Jean was essential and unavoidable. More scenes involving Lara Jean's sisters were included in early screenplay drafts to emphasize the movie's family-oriented theme. In order to make the story appealing to a wide range of age groups, the creative team also sought to create a gentle, timeless atmosphere. The screenplay adapts key moments from the novel while introducing several new scenes designed to enhance character development, particularly in the evolving relationship between Lara Jean and Peter.

This is the first film released by AwesomenessTV after its acquisition by Viacom.

=== Filming ===
Principal photography began in Vancouver, British Columbia and the surrounding areas on July 5, 2017. A large portion of the production was finished in Vancouver, which also served as the American suburban backdrop for the movie. To capture Lara Jean's romantic imagination, the film makers employed gentle pastel lighting. Parts of the film were shot in Portland, Oregon, which is also the setting for the film; a change from the book series which is set in Virginia. Scenes at Lara Jean's high school were filmed at Point Grey Secondary School. Production concluded on August 4, 2017. Handheld camera techniques were employed during instances when Lara Jean experiences emotional uncertainty, thereby enhancing a sense of intimacy. The production design employed gentle textures and warm hues to accentuate the film's inviting aesthetic. The author chose to frame several situations via Lara Jean's point of view to make the tone more personal and reflective, which fits with the book's first-person point of view.

== Release ==
In March 2018, Netflix acquired distribution rights to the film, and released it on August 17, 2018. Netflix launched the film worldwide on the same day, enabling it to access a significantly larger adolescent audience than a conventional theatrical release. The film gained rapid popularity online, with viewers widely sharing scenes and quotes across social media platforms. Interest in the young-adult romantic comedy genre on streaming services increased as a result of its favorable internet reception. Streaming helped it become even more popular, showing that digital platforms might bring back genres that had been less popular in traditional movies.

== Reception ==
On the review aggregation website Rotten Tomatoes, the film holds an approval rating of 96% based on 70 reviews, with an average rating of 7.2/10. The website's critical consensus reads, "To All the Boys I've Loved Before plays by the teen rom-com rules, but relatable characters and a thoroughly charming cast more than make up for a lack of surprises." On Metacritic, the film has a weighted average score of 64 out of 100, based on reviews from 12 critics, indicating "generally favorable reviews". Critics praised the film for its sincerity and fresh approach to teen romance.

Reviewers frequently highlighted Lana Condor's performance as warm, charismatic, and emotionally grounded. Linda Holmes for NPR writes, "The film is precisely what it should be: pleasing and clever, comforting and fun and romantic. Just right for your Friday night, your Saturday afternoon, and many lazy layabout days to come." The film's approachable dialogue and the stars' natural chemistry were cited by several reviews as the main factors contributing to its positive response by both youth and adult audiences. Others pointed out that the movie felt more genuine than other teen romance movies because it concentrated on ordinary situations rather than dramatic exaggeration.

Alexis Gunderson for Paste Magazine writes, "To All the Boys I've Loved Before, the teen scene's newest runaway hit, is a flat-out excellent film. It is not excellent "for a teen flick." It is not excellent "for a romantic comedy." It is excellent for a film."

Rachel Syme for The New Republic praises, "As people re-watch the film in coming months, however, I hope that Lara Jean's name will start trending as much as Peter Kavinsky's has. Centineo performs a type of compassionate male energy that is in short supply in movies at the moment, but Lana Condor is undeniably TATBILB's star. When the film opens, she is daydreaming, picturing herself in a crimson gown on a heath, as the wind blows across her face. In those moments, before the film snaps back into suburbia, Condor is fully convincing as the heroine of a serious period piece. Now, that is all I want to see."

A scene in the film featured Kitty offering Peter a bottle of Yakult led to a spike in sales for the drink in parts of the world.

== Sequels ==
In August 2018, author of the source novel Jenny Han said of a sequel film, which would adapt the second book in the series:

There's so many things in the second book that I would love to see in a sequel. The whole reason why I wrote a second book was for the character of John Ambrose McClaren, who is a fan favorite, and he's a favorite of mine too. I would love to see that explored, and also there's a character called Stormy that I love to write. I would love to see that.

In November 2018, it was reported that Netflix and Paramount's Awesomeness Films were in discussions to produce a sequel to the film, and Netflix announced the development of a sequel film, featuring Condor and Centineo, in December 2018.

Filming for the sequel began on March 27, 2019 and wrapped on May 8. All the cast from the previous film return except Israel Broussard, with newcomer Jordan Fisher portraying Lara Jean's love interest, John Ambrose McClaren.

A third film based on the third book in the series started filming on July 15, 2019, two months after production on the second film wrapped.

== Spin-off television series ==
On March 31, 2021, it was reported that a spin-off series was in early development, starring Anna Cathcart. On October 18, 2021, it was announced that Netflix gave production a series order consisting ten episodes and titled as XO, Kitty. The series XO, Kitty focuses on the life of Kitty Song-Covey (Lara Jean's younger sister) and the roller-coaster experiences she goes through when she moves to South Korea to attend the Korean Independent School of Seoul (also known as KISS), a prestigious high school in Seoul, where her late mother also studied. She moves there to be closer to her long-distance boyfriend, Dae-heon Kim, and to learn more about her mother and her life in high school.
