= Sofia Alvarez (writer) =

American playwright and screenwriter

Sofía Álvarez
- Born: Baltimore, Maryland
- Occupations: Playwright & Screenwriter
- Relatives: Deborah Rudacille (mother) Rafael Alvarez (father)

Sofía Alvarez is an American playwright and screenwriter.

== Biography ==
Sofia Alvarez was born and raised in Baltimore, Maryland. She often goes by her nickname "Fia". She is the daughter of American journalist and science writer Deborah Rudacille and former Baltimore Sun reporter and The Wire writer Rafael Alvarez. She attended Bennington College in Bennington, Vermont prior to attending The Juilliard School's Playwriting Program.

Alvarez’s plays include Between Us Chickens (which premiered at the South Coast Repertory in 2011), Life Drawing, The Fish Bowl, NYLON (TheaterLab), Friend Art (Second Stage Theater, 2016), The Orphan’s Club, Corpse Pose', 'LODGE. Her most recent work, Kill Corp premiered in January 2023. Her musical version of William Steig’s classic children’s book, Amos & Boris premiered at South Coast Repertory in 2018.

In 2018, her adaptation of Jenny Han’s bestselling novel To All the Boys I've Loved Before debuted on Netflix. Its sequel To All the Boys: P.S. I Still Love You premiered on February 12, 2020.

== Selected plays ==
- Between Us Chickens
- Friend Art
- The Fish Bowl
- NYLON
- The Orphan's Club
- Corpse Pose
- LODGE
- Amos & Boris

== Filmography ==
- To All The Boys I've Loved Before
- To All the Boys: P.S. I Still Love You
- Along for the Ride (Directorial debut)

== Television ==
- Man Seeking Woman
- Sirens
