= To All the Boys: P.S. I Still Love You =

2020 film directed by Michael Fimognari

- Official release poster
- Directed by: Michael Fimognari
- Screenplay by: Sofia Alvarez; J. Mills Goodloe
- Based on: P.S. I Still Love You by Jenny Han
- Produced by: Matt Kaplan
- Starring: Lana Condor; Noah Centineo; Jordan Fisher; Anna Cathcart; Janel Parrish; Ross Butler; Madeleine Arthur; Emilija Baranac; Trezzo Mahoro; Holland Taylor; Sarayu Blue; John Corbett
- Cinematography: Michael Fimognari
- Edited by: Joe Klotz
- Music by: Joe Wong
- Production companies: Overbrook Entertainment; Awesomeness Films; Ace Entertainment
- Distributed by: Netflix
- Release date: February 12, 2020
- Running time: 102 minutes
- Country: United States
- Language: English
- Budget: $18 million

To All the Boys: P.S. I Still Love You is a 2020 American teen romantic comedy film directed by Michael Fimognari and written by Sofia Alvarez and J. Mills Goodloe. The film stars Lana Condor, Noah Centineo, Janel Parrish, Anna Cathcart, Trezzo Mahoro, Madeleine Arthur, Emilija Baranac, Kelcey Mawema, Jordan Fisher, Ross Butler, Julie Tao, Sarayu Blue, John Corbett, and Holland Taylor. The film is based on Jenny Han's 2015 novel P.S. I Still Love You.

The film is a sequel to To All the Boys I've Loved Before (2018), and the second installment in the To All the Boys film series. It marks Fimognari's directorial debut, after serving as cinematographer on the first film; he also returns as cinematographer. The film was released on February 12, 2020, exclusively on Netflix, with a third film titled To All the Boys: Always and Forever, also directed by Fimognari, released on February 12, 2021. It received mixed reviews.

== Plot ==
Now an official couple, Lara Jean Covey and her boyfriend Peter Kavinsky go on their first date together. They go out to dinner, then release a paper lantern into the sky with their initials written on it. During their date, they promise not to break each other's hearts.

Lara Jean is surprised to find that one of her former crushes and letter recipients John Ambrose McClaren has written back. She feels compelled to respond, as the letter was heartfelt. So, she informs Peter about her intention to write back to him.

For their high school's volunteer program, Peter attempts to convince Lara Jean to choose the same program as him and his lacrosse team. However, she opts to volunteer at the Belleview Retirement Home instead, following in the footsteps of her older sister Margot.

On her first day there, Lara Jean meets Stormy, an eccentric old lady whom Margot often mentioned. She also discovers that John Ambrose volunteers at Belleview, so they talk about the love letter she had written to him many years ago. He agrees to let her read the letter as long as she gives it back to him afterward. Lara Jean is unable to stop thinking about their conversation and, in addition, is constantly insecure about her relationship with Peter because she cannot stop comparing herself with her former best friend, and Peter's ex-girlfriend, Gen.

On Valentine's Day, Lara Jean witnesses her classmates being serenaded by special a capella groups and is told that Peter had sent a group to serenade Gen every period, back when they were dating. This increases her insecurity, though she forgets about this when she meets Peter later that day. He gives her a silver heart necklace and reads a poem, which she supposes is original but turns out to be two verses of an Edgar Allan Poe poem. He later apologizes and tells her he wishes he could write something like that for her, as he means everything in the poem.

While volunteering at Belleview, Lara Jean and John Ambrose grow closer and plan to throw a Star Ball party there after discovering old decorations. He appears to be developing feelings for her, who has not told him about her relationship with Peter. Lara Jean and John Ambrose hold a gathering at the treehouse where they used to hang out in middle school.

The goal of the gathering is to dig up a time capsule that they had buried years ago with their friends––including Peter, Gen, Chris, and Peter's best friend, Trevor. During their unpacking, Gen claims that she did not put anything in the time capsule. Sensing Lara Jean and John Ambrose's attraction, a jealous Peter reveals his relationship with her. He later confronts Lara Jean about hiding their relationship from John Ambrose, but they reconcile soon after.

The next day, Lara Jean apologizes to John Ambrose for not telling him about Peter, and then dresses up for Peter's game. As she is waiting for him to come out to meet her, Chris shows her a photo she just took of Peter and Gen. Lara Jean confronts Peter and realizes that he never stopped talking to Gen and that, on the ski trip, Peter was planning to get back together with Gen. As he has to hurry to the game, he tells Lara Jean they will have to talk about it later. Feeling too hurt, she breaks up with him, breaking their promise to not break each other's hearts.

Lara Jean goes to the treehouse and meets Gen, who reveals that Peter was only comforting her as her parents are separating, and that she went to him because he had also gone through the same experience. Gen insists that Peter is crazy about Lara Jean, and that she should not doubt him. Gen then reveals that she had, in fact, put a friendship bracelet identical to Lara Jean's in the capsule, but was too embarrassed to show it. Lara Jean realizes that it was her and not Peter who always had Gen on her mind, and makes up with her.

On the night of the retirees' ball, Stormy gives Lara Jean a dress and a makeover. She and John Ambrose dance before going outside in the snow. When they kiss, Lara Jean realizes that she truly loves Peter and does not hold feelings for John. She apologizes to him and rushes outside, surprised to find Peter waiting for her. He is there because he remembers she does not like driving in the snow, something that she told him on their first date.

Peter says Lara Jean can break his heart if she wants, but instead she says that she loves him, and he tells her he loves her back. They kiss and make up, and in an ending voiceover Lara Jean says that she had wanted a fairy-tale relationship with Peter, but is now satisfied with what they have.

== Cast and characters ==
- Lana Condor as Lara Jean Covey, a high school student and Peter's girlfriend
  - Momona Tamada as young Lara Jean
- Noah Centineo as Peter Kavinsky, Lara Jean's boyfriend and a popular lacrosse player
- Jordan Fisher as John Ambrose McClaren, Lara Jean's crush in sixth grade
- Anna Cathcart as Katherine "Kitty" Covey, Lara Jean's playful little sister who got her and Peter together
- Janel Parrish as Margot Covey, Lara Jean's mature and responsible older sister who goes to college in Scotland
- Ross Butler as Trevor, Peter and Lara Jean's very close friend and Chris’ boyfriend
- Madeleine Arthur as Christine, Gen's cousin and Lara Jean's best friend who goes by "Chris"
- Emilija Baranac as Genevieve, also known as Gen, a pretty and popular girl who is Peter's ex and Lara Jean's best-friend-turned-rival
- Trezzo Mahoro as Lucas, Lara Jean's gay and amiable friend as well as one of her former loves
- Holland Taylor as Stormy: An eccentric elderly woman with impeccable style, who lives in the nursing home at which Lara Jean volunteers.
- Sarayu Blue as Trina Rothschild, the Coveys' friendly neighbor who develops a budding romance with Lara Jean's dad
- John Corbett as Dr. Dan Covey, Lara Jean's kind and somewhat protective father
- Kelcey Mawema as Emily, Gen's friend
- Julie Tao as Haven, the Covey girls' cousin

Maddie Ziegler appears in a cameo.

== Production ==
=== Development ===
In August 2018, Jenny Han "There's so many things in the second book that I would love to see in a sequel. The whole reason why I wrote a second book was for the character of John Ambrose McClaren, who is a fan favorite, and he's a favorite of mine too. I would love to see that explored, and also there's a character called Stormy that I love to write. I would love to see that.

In November 2018, it was reported that Netflix and Paramount Pictures' Awesomeness Films were in discussions to produce a sequel, and Netflix announced the development of a sequel featuring Condor and Centineo in December 2018. In March 2019, it was reported that Michael Fimognari, cinematographer on the first film, would make his feature film directorial debut with the sequel, taking over from the original film's director Susan Johnson, who would stay on to executive produce. It was also announced that Parrish, Cathcart, and Corbett would return to costar. It was also announced that J. Mills Goodloe was hired to write the sequel.

The sequel has also cast Jordan Fisher as John Ambrose McClaren, a past love of Lara Jean's, and Ross Butler as Trevor Pike, one of Peter's best friends. Madeleine Arthur would reprise her role as Chris, while Holland Taylor and Sarayu Blue have joined the cast as Stormy McClaren and Trina Rothschild respectively.

=== Filming ===
Principal photography began in Vancouver, British Columbia and the surrounding areas on March 27, 2019. As with the first film, scenes at Lara Jean's high school were filmed at Point Grey Secondary School. Principal photography wrapped on May 10, 2019.

== Music ==
The song "Moral of the Story" by Ashe experienced viral international success after appearing in the film. The film's soundtrack was released digitally on February 7, 2020 by Capitol Records, with a CD release on April 17 and a vinyl release on May 22.

== Release ==
The first trailer for To All the Boys: P.S. I Still Love You was released on December 19, 2019, revealing that the film would be released exclusively on Netflix on February 12, 2020.

== Reception ==
On the review aggregation website Rotten Tomatoes, the film holds an approval rating of 76% based on 72 reviews, with an average rating of 6.7/10. The website's critical consensus reads, "To All the Boys: P.S. I Still Love You may feel like little more than an amiable postscript to its predecessor, but fans of the original should still find this a swoonworthy sequel." On Metacritic, the film has a weighted average score of 54 out of 100, based on reviews from 16 critics, indicating "mixed or average reviews".

Nick Allen of RogerEbert.com gave the film 2 1/2 stars out of 4, and wrote that "its enjoyment will depend largely on whether you want Peter to be the main boy that Lara loves, or not." He added, "It's hard to get past the hope that Lara Jean will someday soon get something better—a better boyfriend, and a better movie."

== Sequel ==
A third film, based on the third novel in the trilogy, began filming on July 15, 2019, two months after production on the second film wrapped.
