= Anna Cathcart =

Canadian actress (born 2003)

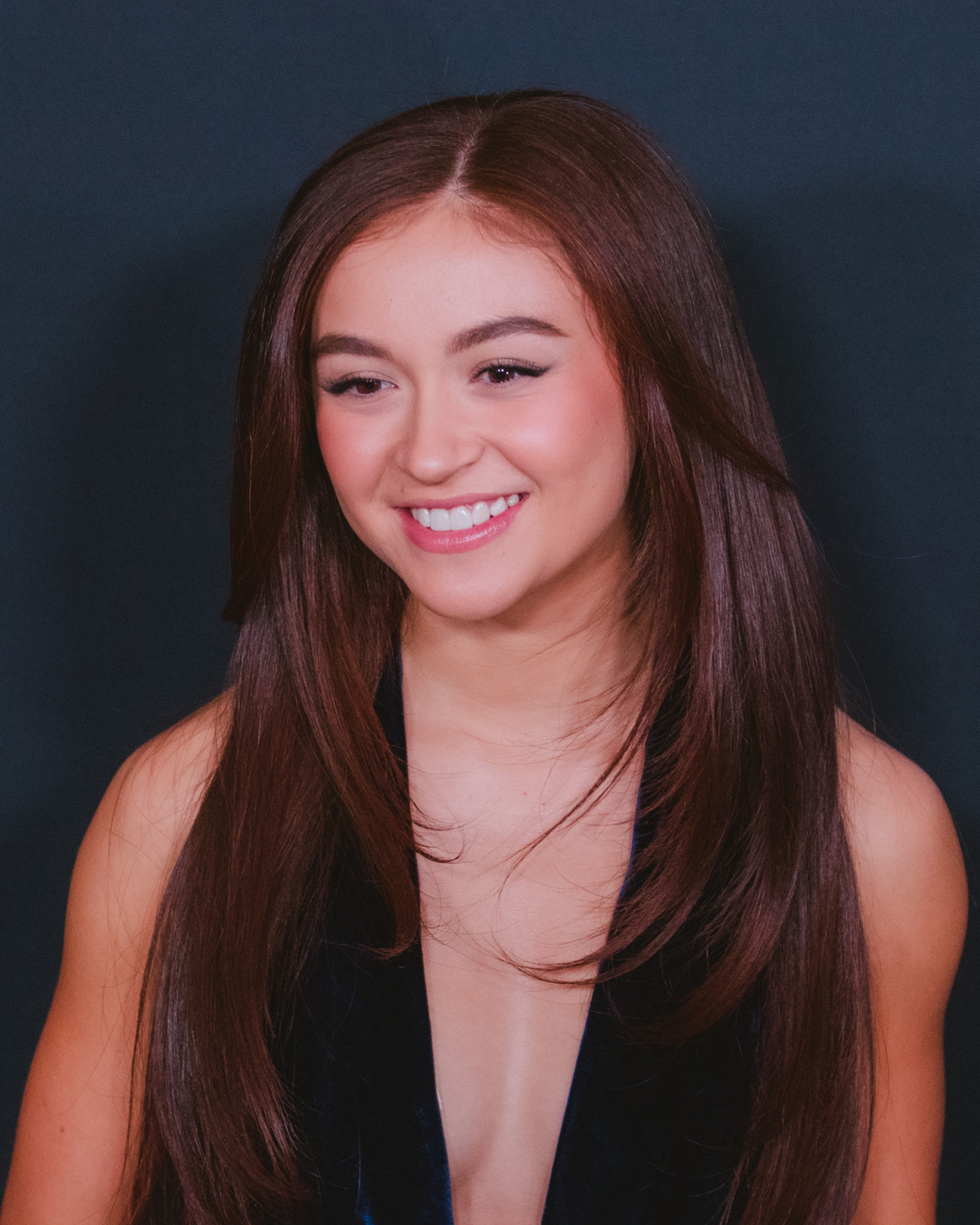
- Cathcart in 2026
- Born: June 16, 2003 (age 23); Vancouver, British Columbia, Canada
- Education: University of British Columbia
- Occupation: Actress
- Years active: 2016–present
- Known for: Odd Squad; XO, Kitty

Anna Cathcart (born June 16, 2003) is a Canadian actress who began her career as a child actress, starring as Agent Olympia in the PBS Kids/TVOKids series Odd Squad (2016–2019) for which she won a Canadian Screen Award. Cathcart also played Dizzy Tremaine in the Disney Channel films Descendants 2 (2017) and Descendants 3 (2019) and the titular role in the Brat web series Zoe Valentine (2019). She gained widespread recognition as a teenager for playing Kitty Song-Covey in Netflix's To All the Boys film series (2018–2021) and in the character’s own spin-off show XO, Kitty (2023−present).

== Early life and education ==
Cathcart was born on June 16, 2003 in Vancouver, British Columbia. She is of Chinese and Irish descent, and has an older sister.

She graduated from high school in 2021, and has described her school experience as "like having two full-time jobs at once". On the set of Odd Squad, she and her castmates were tutored in two-hour blocks. As of 2023, Cathcart attends the University of British Columbia majoring in sociology and creative writing.

== Career ==
=== 2016–2017: Career beginnings ===
Cathcart, at the age of six or seven, gained a talent agent and appeared in a few commercials. At the age of eight, she appeared in a Crayola and Campbell's Soup commercial. She stated that she has "never really been to acting classes", saying that she is inspired by performances on Disney Channel and Netflix.

At the age of 12, following a hiatus, Cathcart was scouted and asked to audition for the TVOKids and PBS Kids series, Odd Squad. She and fellow actor Isaac Kragten were cast as Agents Olympia and Otis respectively. They filmed the series for seven months in Toronto. The first episode of season 2 "First Day" aired on 20 June 2016 on PBS Kids and 21 June 2016 on TVOKids. That same year, Cathcart reprised her role for the film spin-off Odd Squad: The Movie, marking her first theatrical appearance. In November 2016, PBS ordered 20 one to three minute episodes of an Odd Squad spin-off titled OddTube. In the series, Cathcart reprised her role as Agent Olympia, the character who hosted the show.

In 2017, Cathcart appeared in the Disney Channel Original Movie Descendants 2, in which she portrayed Dizzy Tremaine, daughter of Drizella Tremaine. The film premiered with a simulcast across six Disney-owned networks, drawing 13 million viewers.

=== 2018–present: To All the Boys franchise and XO, Kitty ===
Cathcart joined the cast of the film adaption of Jenny Han's bestselling book To All the Boys I've Loved Before, in which she was to portray 11-year-old Kitty Song-Covey, the younger sister of protagonist Lara Jean. The film was released in 2018 on Netflix and quickly became one of the most viewed Netflix original films. The film received generally favourable reviews and critics praised the actors. Molly Freeman of Screen Rant called Cathcart a "hilarious standout" while Charlie Salek of Joker Mag called the supporting performances "crucial".

In November 2018, Cathcart was cast in the Brat web-based series Zoe Valentine in which she was to portray the eponymous character. Cathcart had not auditioned but instead was contacted about the role. The first episode, which premiered on January 17, 2019, received 4.9 million views on YouTube as of November 2020. Cathcart described filming as being "crazy", saying "[it was] such a blur but so much fun". Cathcart starred as Zoe Valentine again in Brat film Spring Breakaway which was released on March 15, 2019, on YouTube. Zoe Valentine was later renewed for a second season. Cathcart reprised her role as Dizzy Tremaine in the third instalment of the Descendants franchise, Descendants 3 in 2019.

Cathcart reprised her role as Kitty in 2020 in To All the Boys: P.S. I Still Love You which had been filmed from March to May 2019, the film being primarily filmed in Vancouver. Released in February 2020, the film received generally mixed reviews. Cathcart received praise for her performance, with The Post writing that Cathcart was one of the only members of the returning cast to bring the "same type of energy as [she] did in the first film." She was nominated for the Cogeco Fund Audience Choice Award.. In mid-2020, because of the restrictions placed due to the COVID-19 pandemic, Cathcart hosted a virtual series called Letters To which allowed fans to connect with their favourite authors. Developed by Picturestart and released on Facebook Watch, Glitter Magazine wrote that the series had "all literary fans buzzing".

Cathcart reprised her role in the third film of the To All the Boys I've Loved Before film series titled To All the Boys: Always and Forever, Lara Jean, which was mostly filmed in Vancouver, New York and Seoul from July to September 2019.

Cathcart played Molly in the 2021 Disney Channel Original Movie Spin. Principal photography for Spin began in early October 2020 and wrapped in late November. Cathcart's performance was commended by Amy Amatangelo of Paste, who called her the "generation's secret weapon" and stated that projects including her were certain to be of high quality. She also reprised her role as Dizzy in the animated special Descendants: The Royal Wedding, which aired after Spin.

In March 2021, it was announced Cathcart would reprise her role as Kitty Song-Covey in a To All the Boys spin-off series, later revealed to be titled XO, Kitty. TheWrap described her as "appropriately sweet", while Comic Book Resources stated she "makes a confident jump to a leading role".

== Filmography ==
=== Film ===
Key
†	Denotes films that have not yet been released

Year	Title	Role	Notes	Ref.
2016	Odd Squad: The Movie	Agent Olympia		
2018	To All the Boys I've Loved Before	Katherine "Kitty" Song-Covey		
2018	Under the Sea: A Descendants Story	Dizzy Tremaine	Short film	
2020	To All the Boys: P.S. I Still Love You	Katherine "Kitty" Song-Covey		
2021	To All the Boys: Always and Forever	Katherine "Kitty" Song-Covey		
2026	The Angry Birds Movie 3 †	TBA	Voice; in production	

=== Television ===
Year	Title	Role	Notes	Ref.
2016	Odd Squad	Agent Olympia	Main role (season 2)	
2016	OddTube	Agent Olympia	Main role (season 1)	
2017	Dino Dana	Robyn	2 episodes	
2017	Descendants 2	Dizzy Tremaine	Television film	
2017	Once Upon a Time	Tween Drizella	2 episodes	
2018	Odd Squad: World Turned Odd	Agent Olympia	Television film	
2019	Fast Layne	Anna	Recurring role	
2019	Descendants 3	Dizzy Tremaine	Television film	
2021	Spin	Molly	Television film	
2021	Descendants: The Royal Wedding	Dizzy Tremaine	Voice; television special	
2021	Star Wars: Visions	Lop	Voice	
2021	See Us Coming Together: A Sesame Street Special	Herself	Television special	
2023	XO, Kitty	Katherine "Kitty" Song-Covey	Main role	
2024	Monster High	Jinafire Long	Voice; 2 episodes	

=== Web ===
Year	Title	Role	Notes	Ref.
2019	Zoe Valentine	Zoe Valentine	Lead role; 15 episodes	
2019	Spring Breakaway	Zoe Valentine	Film	
2020	Letters To	Herself	Host; 10 episodes	

== Awards and nominations ==
Year	Association	Category	Work	Result	Ref.
2019	Canadian Screen Awards	Best Performance in a Children's or Youth Program or Series	Odd Squad	Won	
2025	Favorite Female TV Star (Family)	Favorite Female TV Star – Family Show	XO, Kitty	Nominated	
