= To All the Boys I've Loved Before =

2014 young adult romance novel by Jenny Han

To All The Boys I've Loved Before
- Author: Jenny Han
- Language: English
- Genre: Young adult
- Publisher: Simon & Schuster
- Publication date: April 15, 2014
- Publication place: United States
- Media type: Print (hardback, paperback)
- Pages: 421
- ISBN: 978-1-4424-2671-9
- Followed by: P.S. I Still Love You

To All the Boys I've Loved Before is a 2014 young adult romance novel by American author Jenny Han, first published by Simon & Schuster and released on April 15, 2014. Han was inspired to write the book based on her own habit of writing love letters to boys she had crushes on as a teenager. The novel was followed by two sequels, P.S. I Still Love You, released on May 26, 2015, and Always and Forever, Lara Jean, released on May 2, 2017.

A film adaptation of the book was released on Netflix in 2018. Its plot is similar to the original book with a few changes.

== Plot ==
Lara Jean Song Covey is a sixteen-year-old half-Korean American girl living in Virginia. She is extremely close to her older sister Margot and younger sister Kitty. Lara Jean keeps love letters to all the boys she has ever loved in a teal hatbox given to her by her late mother, who died after an accidental fall when Lara Jean was just 10. There are 5 boys: Margot's boyfriend Josh Sanderson, a boy named Kenny from camp, Peter from 7th grade, Lucas from homecoming, and John Ambrose from model UN. Just before Margot leaves for university in Scotland, she breaks up with Josh, who is also their next-door neighbor and Lara Jean's good friend.

Lara Jean finds her feelings for Josh coming back after Margot leaves for school, and Josh admits during a conversation about crushes that his first serious crush was on Lara Jean. To cope with her feelings, Lara Jean adds a postscript to the letter she previously wrote for Josh expressing her feelings, but does not send it.

Peter Kavinsky, one of the boys Lara Jean wrote a letter to, approaches her and tells her he does not have any sort of attraction to her. Lara Jean is confused but realizes he is referring to the letter she wrote him years ago after receiving it in the mail. Horrified, she tells him she wrote it a long time ago. Lara Jean recounts what prompted her to write the letter: when she was in seventh grade, she and Peter were with a group of mutual friends when Peter kissed her.

Lara Jean cannot find her hatbox at home. That night, she hears Josh come over and hides in a treehouse she used to spend a lot of time in as a kid. The next morning at school, Josh asks her about the letter to him. She lies and says she no longer has feelings for him and that she is dating someone else. When he asks who it is, she says Peter as he's the first person she thinks of while he walks down the hallway. Lara Jean spontaneously jumps onto Peter and kisses him in front of Josh, and Peter kisses her back. At school, Lara Jean explains her situation to Peter, who decides to go along with the lie, as he has just broken up with his long-term girlfriend Genevieve (also Lara Jean's enemy) and wants a clean break.

Lara Jean and Peter set up a list of ground rules for acting around each other. The more time they spend together, the more confused Lara Jean gets about her feelings. As Lara Jean and Peter begin to genuinely fall for each other, Josh becomes jealous of Peter, and when Lara Jean confronts him about it, he kisses her and tells her he wants to be with her, which makes Lara Jean realize that she no longer likes Josh and that she wants to date Peter for real.

On a school ski trip, Peter tells Lara Jean he does want to date her and they kiss in a hot tub. The following day, Genevieve tells her that there is a rumor that the two had sex in the hot tub, and Peter did not deny it. Humiliated, Lara Jean avoids Peter during Christmas break. Kitty invites him over to the Covey's recital party, which they had every year before their mother died. When Peter tries to talk to Lara Jean, Josh steps in to try and protect her, and Margot ends up hearing about how Josh and Lara Jean kissed.

Margot and Lara Jean eventually reconcile, but Lara Jean remains angry at Peter until Kitty admits that she stole her sister's hatbox and mailed the letters to try and get back at Lara Jean for almost revealing Kitty's crush on Josh. Lara Jean forgives Kitty. Kitty tells Lara Jean that Peter really cares for her and returns the hatbox that is now filled with notes that Peter gave Lara Jean while they were fake-dating. Reading them over, Lara Jean has a change of heart and takes out her pen and paper to write a real love letter to Peter.

== Reception ==
The novel spent 40 weeks on The New York Times Best Seller list in the Young Adult fiction section. It has been published in 30 languages.

== Film adaptation ==
In June 2014, it was reported that Overbrook Entertainment, actor Will Smith's production company, had secured the film rights to the novel, with Annie Neal hired to adapt the book for the screen. Smith and Overbrook's James Lassiter produced. Carrie Pilby director Susan Johnson directed the film, from a screenplay by Sofia Alvarez, with Lana Condor, Janel Parrish, Anna Cathcart, Noah Centineo, Israel Broussard, and John Corbett starring. Production began in Vancouver in July 2017, and the film was released by Netflix on August 17, 2018. The film received positive reviews.

== Graphic novel ==
A graphic novel adaptation of the novel, adapted by Barbara Perez Marquez and illustrated by Akimaro Lu and Li Lu, was published by Simon & Schuster on May 5, 2026.
