= Janel Parrish =

American actress and musician (born 1988)

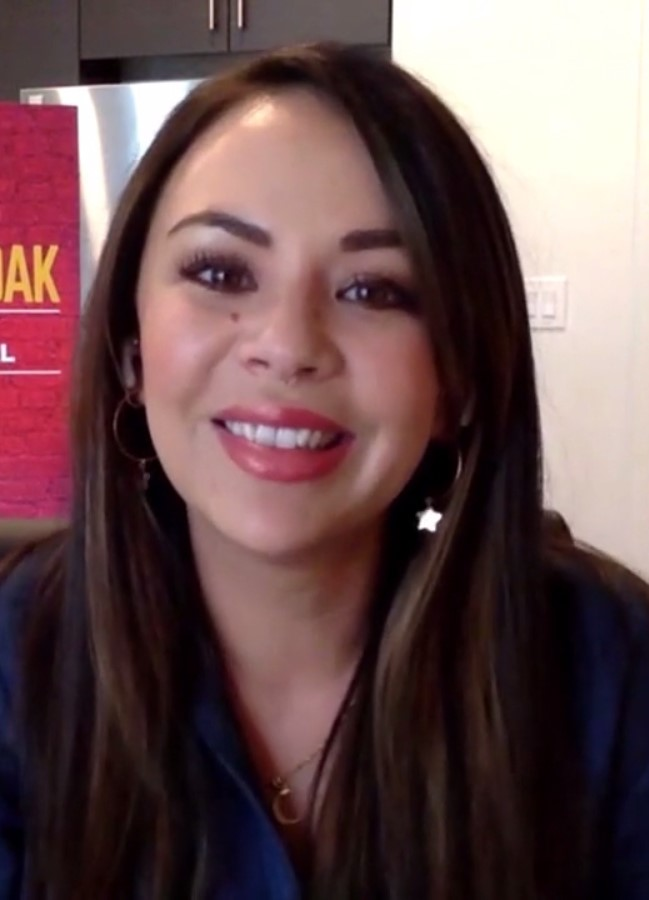
- Parrish in 2020
- Born: Janel Meilani Parrish; October 30, 1988 (age 37); Kāneʻohe, Hawaii, U.S.
- Occupations: Actress; singer
- Years active: 1996–present
- Spouse: Chris Long (m. 2018; div. 2026)
- Website: Official website

Janel Meilani Parrish (born October 30, 1988) is an American actress and singer. She starred as Mona Vanderwaal in Pretty Little Liars (2010–17) and its spin-off, Pretty Little Liars: The Perfectionists (2019), and as Margot Covey in the To All the Boys series (2018–21). She also portrayed Young Cosette in the Broadway production of Les Misérables (1996), and Jade in the teen comedy film Bratz (2007). She finished in third place on the tenth season of Fox's The Masked Singer in 2023. She has also starred in numerous movies for Hallmark.

== Early life and education ==
Parrish was born in Kāne'ohe, Honolulu, Hawaii, and raised in Honolulu and, in her teens, California. Her mother Joanne (née Mew) is of Han Chinese descent, and her father Mark Parrish, is of German, Irish, and English descent. She has one sister, Melissa Nohelani, who is eight years older and served as an officer in the U.S. Army. Her parents are former bodybuilders, and her mother worked for a Honolulu health club.

At the age of nine, Parrish saw a production of The Phantom of the Opera at the Neal S. Blaisdell Center and fell in love with the idea of performing. She began playing the piano, and within a year was also studying acting, singing, tap and jazz dance. She entered several talent contests, and became well known to local Oahu residents. At age 14, she appeared in the 2003 remake of Star Search, performing the song "On My Own" from Les Misérables. She attended Moanalua Elementary School, and Moanalua High School for her freshman year. Parrish lived in Kaneohe, Hawaii until the age of 14, when she and her family moved to Burbank, Los Angeles so she could pursue a career in the entertainment industry. Parrish was then homeschooled in order to accommodate her work schedule.

== Career ==
=== Film and television ===
Parrish began her acting career when she was cast as Young Cosette in the National Touring Company of Les Misérables, and later portrayed the role for two months in the Broadway production at the Imperial Theatre. She subsequently appeared in several community theatre productions in Hawaii – most notably as Jean Louise "Scout" Finch in Manoa Valley Theatre's revival of To Kill a Mockingbird in 1998. In 1999, Parrish landed her first substantial television role in NBC's action series Baywatch, appearing in two episodes as Hina, a young girl whom Mitch Buchannon (David Hasselhoff) saves from drowning.

In 2000, Parrish was featured in Disney's live-action television film based on the Pinocchio story Geppetto, portraying the role of Natalie. She then went on to appear as Vanessa in The WB's short-lived sitcom The O'Keefes. Parrish also appeared in shows and made-for-television films on the Disney Channel, and also guest starred in Fox's sitcom The Bernie Mac Show, Nickelodeon's children's comedy-drama series Zoey 101, and Fox's teen drama series The O.C.. Parrish then portrayed Bratz member Jade in the 2007 live-action film Bratz. The role was her first in a motion picture, as well as her first starring role. She also provided her voice for the Bratz 4 Real video game. In May 2007, shortly before the release of Bratz, she was signed to the William Morris Agency. She then landed a recurring role in the NBC supernatural drama series Heroes.

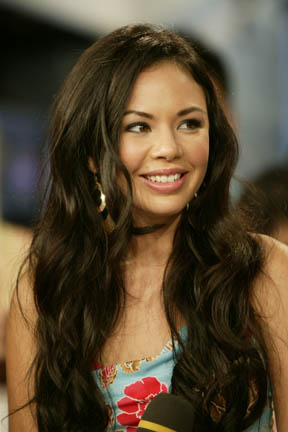
Parrish promoting Bratz film at MuchMusic in 2007.

Parrish played Mona Vanderwaal for the duration of the Freeform teen drama series Pretty Little Liars, based on the book series by Sara Shepard. Mona is introduced in the first season as a teenage outsider who uses her intelligence and resources to torment others anonymously. In March 2012, Parrish was promoted to a series regular for the third season, and stayed a regular for the remainder of the series. For her performance as Mona, she won Choice TV – Villain at the Teen Choice Awards four times from five nominations.

In February 2012, Parrish returned to her stage roots in a production of the musical Spring Awakening. She portrayed Anna, while also understudying the lead female role of Wendla Bergmann. That same year, she had a supporting role in the romantic comedy-drama film Celeste and Jesse Forever. She subsequently guest starred in the CBS drama series Hawaii Five-0, playing the role of Rebecca Fine, an ambitious and strong-willed chemistry student, and made a guest appearance in Lifetime's fantasy legal drama series Drop Dead Diva as bullied cheerleader Chelsea Putnam. Also in 2014, Parrish led the cast of the Lifetime thriller film High School Possession as Lauren Brady. The following year, she had a guest role in NBC's comedy-drama series The Mysteries of Laura as one half of a jewelry store-robbing duo. In 2017, she guest starred in Fox's procedural drama series Rosewood, playing Selena Monet, a young popstar. In November 2017, Parrish began portraying Sandy Dumbrowski in a Toronto production of Grease, alongside Katie Findlay. She then portrayed Lisa Wagner in the romance film Until We Meet Again, alongside Jackson Rathbone.

Parrish co-starred as Margot Covey in the film adaptation of Jenny Han's young adult romance novel To All the Boys I've Loved Before, with Lana Condor and John Corbett, and appeared alongside Angela Trimbur and Fairuza Balk in the home-invasion thriller Hell Is Where the Home Is. Parrish will co-star with Mickey Rourke in the upcoming boxing drama Tiger. She reprised her role as Mona Vanderwaal in the Pretty Little Liars spin-off drama series, Pretty Little Liars: The Perfectionists. The show premiered on Freeform on March 20, 2019 and concluded on May 22, 2019.

In 2023, Parrish competed in season ten of The Masked Singer as "Gazelle". She finished in third place.

Parrish has also starred in numerous Hallmark movies: "Holly and Ivy", 2020, "Right In Front Of Me", 2021, "Coyote Creek Christmas", 2021, "Family History Mysteries: Buried Past", 2023, "Never Been Chris'd", 2023, " "Sugarplummed", 2024, Haunted Wedding", 2024 and "Christmas On Duty", 2025.

=== Music ===
At age eight, Parrish won a statewide singing competition in Hawaii. She began writing her own music as a teenager and eventually became the lead singer of the three-piece girl group, Impulse. In 2007, Parrish was signed to Geffen Records as a solo artist to produce her first album. Her first single, "Rainy Day", which she wrote herself, and its music video, was released on July 7, 2007. The song also featured on the Bratz soundtrack. Parrish made appearances in Prima J's music video for "Rockstar" and NLT's music video for "She Said, I Said", which were both featured on the Bratz soundtrack. She also provided background vocals for the latter. In April 2015, she released two songs, "Heart Made of Stone" and "Senseless", both of which she co-wrote with Vince Pizzinga.

=== Dancing with the Stars ===
In August 2014, Parrish was announced as one of the celebrities competing on the 19th season of Dancing with the Stars. She was paired with professional dancer Valentin Chmerkovskiy. During week three, "Movie Night", their Jazz dance received the season's first perfect score, and held the record for earliest perfect score on the show (the record was later matched by Bethany Mota and her partner Derek Hough on the same night). Parrish and Chmerkovskiy reached the finale but ended up in third place, behind Alfonso Ribeiro and Sadie Robertson, who took first and second place respectively.

Week #	Dance/Song	Judges' scores				Result
Week #	Dance/Song	Inaba	Goodman	Hough	Tonioli	Result
1	Jive / "Bang Bang"	7	7	7	8	Safe
2	Foxtrot / "Call Me Maybe"	9	8	8	9	Safe
3	Jazz / "America"	10	10	10	10	Safe
4	Rumba / "How Will I Know"	9	9	9	9	Safe
5	Burlesque / "Mamma Knows Best"	8	8	8	9	No elimination
6	Samba / "La Vida Es Un Carnaval"	8	7	9	9	Last to be called safe
7	Viennese waltz / "Secret"; Team Freestyle / "Black Widow"	8; 9	7; 9	8; 9	8; 9	Safe
8	Contemporary / "Everybody's Free (To Feel Good)"	10	10	10	10	Safe (Immunity)
9	Quickstep / "Hey Boy, Hey Girl"; Salsa (Trio Challenge) / "Morning Drums"	9; 10	10; 9	10; 10	9; 10	Safe
10; Semi-finals	Paso doble / "Blame"; Argentine tango / "Blame" (acoustic version)	10; 9	10; 9	10; 10	10; 10	Safe
11; Finals	Samba / "La Vida Es Un Carnaval"; Freestyle / "I'm Gonna Be (500 Miles)"; Fusion (Foxtrot & Paso doble) / "Hideaway"	9; 10; 10	10; 10; 10	9; 10; 10	9; 10; 10	3rd place

=== Other ventures ===
She modeled Camille La Vie & Group USA's prom dresses for Seventeen magazine and served as a special guest judge at the annual Camille La Vie & Group USA and Seventeen's "Celebrity Prom" event in March 2014. She has graced the covers of numerous fashion magazines, including Nationalist, Pulse Spikes, Luca, Vulkan and Modeliste.

Parrish is popular on social media and endorses products such as beauty and wellness products on Instagram. She has partnered with several brands, including Room & Board Modern Furniture products, Robitussin cold relief, Beauty Rest Black mattress and Glade candles.

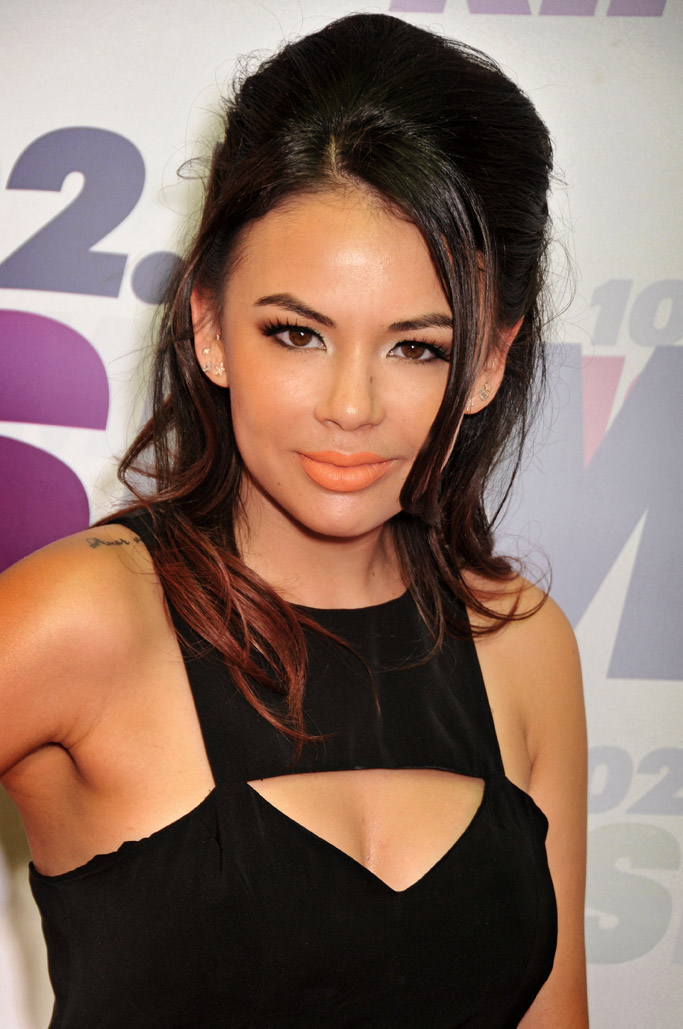
Parrish in 2013

== Philanthropy ==
In October 2018, she appeared in an anti-bullying public service announcement for Disney and ABC’s #ChooseKindness campaign with Sasha Pieterse for National Bullying Prevention Month. "I have had experiences being bullied. For me, it was definitely high school. I was not the popular girl at all," she told People magazine.

== Personal life ==
Parrish began dating chemical engineer Chris Long in September 2016, and became engaged to him on October 23, 2017. They married on September 8, 2018, at Kualoa Ranch, Oahu, Hawaii. Her father-in-law was killed by a drunk driver two weeks before the wedding. "We went to Hawaii and we had the most beautiful day, and during our vows, when Chris started talking about his dad, the sky opened up and it just started pouring rain on us. It was such a beautiful, I mean I don't think anybody was dry eyed, like everybody cried because it was such a beautiful moment," Parrish recalled to ET in 2019.

Parrish and Long were separated for a couple of months before news broke in April 2026. On May 21, 2026, Parrish had reached a settlement in her divorce with Long. Parrish was in a relationship with professional dancer Sasha Farber. They broke up in July 2026.

== Filmography ==
=== Film ===
Year	Title	Role	Notes
2007	Bratz	Jade	
2009	Fired Up!	Lana	
2009	April Showers	Vicki	
2010	Triple Dog	Cicely	
2011	One Kine Day	Leilani	
2011	4 Wedding Planners	Hoku Wolf	
2012	Celeste and Jesse Forever	Savannah	
2018	I'll Be Watching	Kate Riley	
2018	To All the Boys I've Loved Before	Margot Song-Covey	
2018	Hell Is Where the Home Is	Estelle	
2018	Tiger	Charlotte	
2020	Mighty Oak	Gina Jackson	
2020	To All the Boys: P.S. I Still Love You	Margot Song-Covey	
2021	To All the Boys: Always and Forever	Margot Song-Covey	
2021	Christmas Is Cancelled	Brandy Barnes	
2022	Until We Meet Again	Lisa Wagner	
2022	The Ray	Faith	
2025	The Littles	Sarah	

=== Television ===
Year	Title	Role	Notes
1999	Baywatch	Hina	2 episodes
2000	Geppetto	Natalie	Television film
2003	Star Search	Herself (Junior Singer)	Episode: "The One with Guest Judge Jack Osbourne"
2004	The Bernie Mac Show	Laura	Episode: "Being Bernie Mac"
2006	Zoey 101	Sara	Episode: "The Silver Hammer Society"
2006	The O.C.	Leah	Episode: "The Summer Bummer"
2007–2008	Heroes	May	4 episodes
2009	True Jackson, VP	Kyla	Episode: "Flirting with Fame"
2010–2017	Pretty Little Liars	Mona Vanderwaal	Recurring role (seasons 1–2); main role (seasons 3–7)
2013	A LiArs Guide to Rosewood	Mona Vanderwaal	Narrated special recap episode
2013	Hawaii Five-0	Rebecca Fine	Episode: "Kapu"
2014	Drop Dead Diva	Chelsea Putnam	Episode: "Cheers & Jeers"
2014	Dancing with the Stars	Herself	Contestant (season 19)
2014	High School Possession	Lauren Brady	Television film
2015	The Mysteries of Laura	Jillian Havemeyer	Episode: "The Mystery of the Crooked Clubber"
2016	Rush Hour	Nina Taylor	Episode: "Wind Beneath My Wingman"
2017	Rosewood	Selena Monet	Episode: "Mummies & Meltdowns"
2018	I'll Be Watching	Kate Riley	Television film
2019	Pretty Little Liars: The Perfectionists	Mona Vanderwaal	Main role
2020–2021	Magnum P.I.	Maleah	Episodes: "Say Hello to Your Past", "Tell No One"
2020	Holly & Ivy	Melody	Television film
2021	Right in Front of Me	Carly	Television film
2021	Scooby-Doo, Where Are You Now!	Herself (host)	Television special
2021	Coyote Creek Christmas	Paige Parker	Television film
2023	Family History Mysteries: Buried Past	Sophie McClure	Television film
2023	Never Been Chris’d	Naomi	Television film
2023	The Masked Singer	Gazelle	Contestant on season 10; 3rd place
2024	Haunted Wedding	Jana	Television film
2024	Sugarplummed	Sugarplum	Television film
2025	XO, Kitty	Margot Song-Covey	Episode: "Sealed with a Kiss"
2025	Return To Office	Ms. Monday/ Olivia "Liv" Smith	Television film
2025	Christmas on Duty	Blair Birch	Television film
2026	Two For Tee	Tee	Television film

=== Music videos ===
Year	Title	Artist	Role	Ref.
2007	"Rockstar"	Prima J	Bratz member Jade	
2007	"Rainy Day"	Janel Parrish		
2007	"She Said, I Said (Time We Let Go)"	NLT	Ex Girlfriend	
2015	"Come On Get Happy"	The Coca-Cola Artists	Herself	
2015	"Lay Me Down"	Brian Justin Crum & Janel Parrish		
2015	"When It's Over"	Janel Parrish		

== Stage ==
Year	Title	Role	Location(s)	Ref
1996	Les Misérables	Young Cosette	National tour and Imperial Theatre	
1998	To Kill a Mockingbird	Scout Finch	Manoa Valley Theatre	
1999	Here's Love	Susan Walker	Diamond Head Theatre	
2000	The Best Christmas Pageant Ever	Beth Bradley	Diamond Head Theatre	
2001	On Dragonfly Wings	Wendy Waterbug	Leeward Community College Theater	
2012	Spring Awakening	Anna	Theatre of Arts Arena Stage	
2015	Cruel Intentions: The '90s Musical	Kathryn Merteuil	Rockwell Table & Stage	
2017	A Walk to Remember: The Musical	Jamie Sullivan	Prospect Theatre	
2017	Cruel Intentions: The '90s Musical	Cecile Caldwell	(Le) Poisson Rouge	
2017–2018	Grease	Sandy Dumbrowski	Elgin and Winter Garden Theatres	
2019	The Last Five Years	Cathy Hiatt	After Hours Theatre Company	
2021	Cruel Intentions: The '90s Musical	Kathryn Merteuil	The Bourbon Room	

== Discography ==
=== Singles ===
Title	Year	Album
"Rainy Day"	2007	Bratz
"When It's Over"	2015	Non-album singles
"Only Hope"	2017	Non-album singles
"Everything"	2019	Non-album singles

=== Promotional singles ===
Title	Year	Album
"Lay Me Down" (with Brian Justin Crum)	2015	Non-album singles
"Heart Made of Stone"	2015	Non-album singles
"Senseless"	2015	Non-album singles
"Life Is Beautiful"	2015	Non-album singles

=== Soundtrack ===
Year	Movie	Song	Notes
2007	Bratz	"Rainy Day"	Writer and performer
2007	Bratz	"Open Eyes"	Performer
2007	Bratz	"Bratitude"	Performer
2008	Guiding Light	"Won't Let You Go"	Writer and performer
2008	Adventures in Appletown	"I'm Changing"	Performer
2009	April Showers	"I Won't Cry"	Writer and performer
2010	Triple Dog	"Rush"	Performer
2014	Pretty Little Liars	"Gravity"	Performer
2017	Rosewood	"Dance for Me"	Performer

== Awards and nominations ==
Year	Award	Category	Work	Result	Ref
2008	Razzie award	Worst Actress	Bratz (film)	Nominated	
2012	Teen Choice Awards	Choice TV – Villain	Pretty Little Liars	Won	
2013	Teen Choice Awards	Choice TV – Villain	Pretty Little Liars	Won	
2013	TV Guide Awards	Favorite Villain (with Keegan Allen)	Pretty Little Liars	Nominated	
2014	Teen Choice Awards	Choice TV – Villain	Pretty Little Liars	Nominated	
2016	Teen Choice Awards	Choice TV – Villain	Pretty Little Liars	Won	
2017	Teen Choice Awards	Choice TV – Villain	Pretty Little Liars	Won	
