= Emilija Baranac =

Canadian actress and model

- Born: August 4, 1994 (age 32); Vancouver, British Columbia, Canada
- Occupations: Actress; model
- Years active: 2010–present

Emilija Baranac (born August 4, 1994) is a Canadian actress and model. She is known for her portrayal of Midge Klump in The CW drama series Riverdale and as Genevieve in the To All the Boys I've Loved Before film series.

== Life and career ==
Baranac was born in Vancouver, British Columbia to Serbian parents.

She portrayed Midge Klump in the second season of The CW's drama series Riverdale. Baranac also co-starred as Genevieve in the film adaptation of Jenny Han's young adult romance novel To All the Boys I've Loved Before.

== Filmography ==
Year	Title	Role	Notes
2013	Aliens in the House	Sophie	Unsold pilot
2015	Supernatural	Crystal Thorrson	Episode: "Brother's Keeper"
2015	Love You to Death	Paige Winters	
2016	#Sti	Emily	Episode: "A Weekend to Remember"
2017	Beyond	Jamie	4 episodes
2017	Deadly Sorority	Kristina Roberts	
2017–2019	Riverdale	Midge Klump	Recurring role, 9 episodes (season 2–3)
2018	To All the Boys I've Loved Before	Genevieve	Main cast
2019–2021	Charmed	Heidi	3 episodes
2019	Tempting Fate	Olivia Cartwright	Secondary cast
2019	Chilling Adventures of Sabrina	Audrey	Episode: "Chapter Fifteen: Doctor Cerberus's House of Horror"
2019	Recess: Third Street	Ashley T	Fan-made film
2020	To All the Boys: P.S. I Still Love You	Genevieve	Main cast
2021	To All the Boys: Always and Forever	Genevieve	Main cast
2021	There's Someone Inside Your House	Hailey Holcomb	Secondary cast
2022	The Midnight Club	Katherine	Secondary cast
2022	Fakes	Zoe Christensen	Lead role
2025	The Wrong Paris	Emily	Secondary cast
2026	Yaga	Angel	2 episodes
