= Overbrook Entertainment =

American entertainment company

Overbrook Entertainment, Inc.
- Logo used since 2003
- Company type: Subsidiary
- Industry: Entertainment; Film
- Founded: February 2, 1998; 28 years ago
- Founders: Will Smith; James Lassiter
- Headquarters: Culver City, California
- Key people: Will Smith (partner); James Lassiter (partner); Jada Pinkett Smith (partner)
- Products: Motion pictures, music, home entertainment, talent management, television production
- Parent: Westbrook Inc. (2019–present)
- Website: www.overbrookent.com

Overbrook Entertainment, Inc. is an American production company based in Culver City, California. It was founded by partners Will Smith and James Lassiter in 1998, around the same time production for Wild Wild West (1999) began.

The name "Overbrook" is derived from Will Smith's neighborhood in West Philadelphia. The on-screen logo consists of a spinning record with the company name. The company produces music, films and television shows. Smith claimed to have started the company in order to serve as producer and find roles. He uses his role in the company to help unknown artists record music, and also records music for some of his films in Overbrook.

== History ==
On November 11, 1997, actor Will Smith (age 29) and manager James Lassiter signed an overall first-look term deal at Universal Pictures. Thus, Overbrook Entertainment was born. It was formally incorporated on February 2, 1998.

David Tochterman, formerly employee of The Carsey-Werner Company, joined the company on September 16, 1998, and decided to launch the television division. Tochterman produced shows for the broadcast and cable television networks.

The music division was restructured with John Dukakis, formerly an employee of Southpaw Entertainment, signed as executive vice president of its music division on February 11, 1999.

On May 10, 2000, it was announced that a merger with The Firm had been proposed, but it was later scrapped.

Overbrook Entertainment announced on December 10, 2000 that it was renewing its interest in the television division. Its plans were to include a 13-episode animated series commitment for Nickelodeon, as well as a slew of comedy, drama and telemovies on various broadcast networks. The studio was landing deals for three sitcoms, three dramas and one telefilm for various web networks.

The studio's contract with Universal Pictures ended on January 30, 2002. It then formally signed a contract with Sony Pictures Entertainment to develop feature films.

In the years of 2009, 2015 and 2017, the studio went on hiatus where the films from the company are not released yet for the next three years.

The studio announced that it wouldn't renew its deal with Sony Pictures Entertainment on January 3, 2018.

On July 10, 2019, Smith and his wife, actress Jada Pinkett Smith, announced the formation of Westbrook Inc., with Overbrook Entertainment being as one of the subsidiaries of the company. It is reported that Westbrook Studios would sign a deal with National Geographic.

== Filmography ==
=== Films ===
==== 2000s ====
Year	Title	Director	Distributor	Notes
2001	Ali	Michael Mann	Sony Pictures Releasing	co-production with Columbia Pictures, Initial Entertainment Group, Peters Entertainment and Forward Pass
2004	I, Robot	Alex Proyas	20th Century Fox	co-production with Laurence Mark Productions, Davis Entertainment and Mediastream IV
2004	Saving Face	Alice Wu	Sony Pictures Classics	co-production with Destination Films
2005	Hitch	Andy Tennant	Sony Pictures Releasing	co-production with Columbia Pictures
2006	ATL	Chris Robinson	Warner Bros. Pictures	
2006	The Pursuit of Happyness	Gabriele Muccino	Sony Pictures Releasing	co-production with Columbia Pictures, Relativity Media and Escape Artists
2007	I Am Legend	Francis Lawrence	Warner Bros. Pictures	co-production with Village Roadshow Pictures, Weed Road Pictures, Heyday Films and Original Film
2008	Hancock	Peter Berg	Sony Pictures Releasing	co-production with Columbia Pictures, Relativity Media, Weed Road Pictures, Forward Pass and Blue Light
2008	The Human Contract	Jada Pinkett Smith	Self-distributed	co-production with Tycoon Entertainment and 100% Womon Productions
2008	Lakeview Terrace	Neil LaBute	Sony Pictures Releasing	co-production with Screen Gems
2008	The Secret Life of Bees	Gina Prince-Bythewood	Fox Searchlight Pictures	co-production with The Donners' Company
2008	Seven Pounds	Gabriele Muccino	Sony Pictures Releasing	co-production with Columbia Pictures, Relativity Media and Escape Artists

==== 2010s ====
Year	Title	Director	Distributor	Notes
2010	The Karate Kid	Harald Zwart	Sony Pictures Releasing	co-production with Columbia Pictures, China Film Group Corporation and JW Productions
2012	This Means War	McG	20th Century Fox	co-production with Robert Simonds Productions and Genre Films
2013	After Earth	M. Night Shyamalan	Sony Pictures Releasing	co-production with Columbia Pictures, Relativity Media and Blinding Edge Pictures
2014	Annie	Will Gluck	Sony Pictures Releasing	co-production with Columbia Pictures, LStar Capital, Village Roadshow Pictures and Olive Bridge Entertainment
2015	Focus	Glenn Ficarra; John Requa	Warner Bros. Pictures	co-production with RatPac-Dune Entertainment, Di Novi Pictures, Kramer & Sigman Films and Zaftig Films
2016	Collateral Beauty	David Frankel	Warner Bros. Pictures	co-production with New Line Cinema, Village Roadshow Pictures, RatPac-Dune Entertainment, Anonymous Content, PalmStar Media and Likely Story
2017	Bright	David Ayer	Netflix	uncredited; co-production with Trigger Warning Entertainment and Grand Electric
2018	To All the Boys I've Loved Before	Susan Johnson	Netflix	co-production with Awesomeness Films
2019	Hala	Minhal Baig	Apple TV+	co-production with Endeavor Content

==== 2020s ====
Year	Title	Director	Distributor	Notes
2020	Bad Boys for Life	Adil & Bilall	Sony Pictures Releasing	co-production with Columbia Pictures, 2.0 Entertainment and Don Simpson/Jerry Bruckheimer Films
2020	To All the Boys: P.S. I Still Love You	Michael Fimognari	Netflix	uncredited; co-production with Awesomeness Films and Ace Entertainment
2020	Charm City Kings	Ángel Manuel Soto	HBO Max	co-production with Warner Bros. Pictures, Sony Pictures Classics and Warner Max
2020	Life in a Year	Mitja Okorn	Sony Pictures Releasing	co-production with Columbia Pictures
2021	To All the Boys: Always and Forever	Michael Fimognari	Netflix	uncredited; co-production with Awesomeness Films and Ace Entertainment
2021	The Harder They Fall	Jeymes Samuel	Netflix	uncredited
2021	King Richard	Reinaldo Marcus Green	Warner Bros. Pictures	co-production with Westbrook Studios and Star Thrower Entertainment
2022	Emancipation	Antoine Fuqua	Apple TV+	co-production with Westbrook Studios, McFarland Entertainment, Escape Artists and Apple Studios
2024	Bad Boys: Ride or Die	Adil & Bilall	Sony Pictures Releasing	co-production with Columbia Pictures, Westbrook Studios, 2.0 Entertainment and Don Simpson/Jerry Bruckheimer Films

=== Television ===
==== 2000s ====
Years	Title	Creator	Network	Notes
2003–2007	All of Us	Will Smith; Jada Pinkett Smith; Betsy Borns	UPN (seasons 1–3); The CW (season 4)	co-production with Warner Bros. Television

==== 2010s ====
Years	Title	Creator	Network	Notes
2010–2011	Hawthorne	John Masius	TNT	continued from 100% Womon Productions; co-production with FanFare Productions, John Masius Productions and Sony Pictures Television
2013–2015	The Queen Latifah Show	Queen Latifah	Syndication	revival of the 1999 series; co-production with Flavor Unit Entertainment, Curly One Productions and Sony Pictures Television
2018–2025	Cobra Kai	Josh Heald; Jon Hurwitz; Hayden Schlossberg; Television sequel to the Karate Kid film series by: Robert Mark Kamen	YouTube Red (season 1); YouTube Premium (season 2); Netflix (seasons 3–6)	Co-production with Hurwitz & Schlossberg Productions (seasons 1–2), Heald Productions (season 2), Counterbalance Entertainment (seasons 3–6), Westbrook Studios (seasons 3–6) and Sony Pictures Television

==== 2020s ====
Years	Title	Creator	Network	Notes
2021–2025	Bel–Air	Andy Borowitz and Susan Borowitz	Peacock	co-production with Arbolada Roads, Ra Shines Inc., Cooper Films, The 51, Westbrook Studios and Universal Television

== Soundtrack ==
Year	Title	Artist	Distributor	Notes
1999	Wild Wild West	Various artists	Interscope Records	
2000	Love & Basketball	Various artists	Interscope Records	
2002	Men in Black II	Danny Elfman	Columbia Records	
2014	Annie	Various artists	RCA Records	

== Distribution ==
Year	Title	Director	Notes
2005	The 7th Commandment	Theron Alford	DVD distribution; co-production with 25Eight Productions and A Free World Productions
