= Eye of the Hurricane (2012 film) =

- Promotional poster
- Directed by: Jesse Wolfe
- Written by: Jesse Wolfe
- Produced by: Susan Johnson
- Starring: Melanie Lynskey; Campbell Scott; Nicola Peltz; Colin Ford; José Zúñiga; Brian Doyle-Murray
- Cinematography: Nicola Marsh
- Edited by: Phillip J. Bartell
- Music by: David Robbins
- Production company: Entertainment One
- Distributed by: Havensfoot Entertainment; Braveart Films
- Release date: 2012 (festival circuit)
- Running time: 104 minutes
- Country: United States
- Language: English

Eye of the Hurricane is a 2012 American drama film written and directed by Jesse Wolfe. It stars Melanie Lynskey and Campbell Scott.

== Premise ==
A small Everglades community struggles to piece itself back together in the wake of a catastrophic hurricane.

== Cast ==
- Melanie Lynskey as Amelia Kyte
- Campbell Scott as Bill Folsom
- Nicola Peltz as Renee Kyte
- Colin Ford as Mike Ballard
- José Zúñiga as Roberto Cruz
- Brian Doyle-Murray as Harvey Miken
- Grant Collins as Homer Kyte
- Gregory Cruz as The Seminole
- Wendi Motte as Abby Nelson
- Joyce Guy as Mrs. Nelson

== Production ==
Hurricane was shot entirely in St. Marys, Georgia, over 24 days between October and November 2010. In order to raise the funds to complete post-production, a Kickstarter campaign was initiated by Susan Johnson, the film's producer.

== Release and reception ==
The film played at various festivals throughout 2012, including the Woods Hole Film Festival, where it was nominated for Best Dramatic Feature. In their review of the film, the Cape Cod Times described it as "a tale of loss, desire and rebirth, enhanced by strong performances by [Lynskey] and [Peltz]".
