= Lana Condor =

American actress (born 1997)

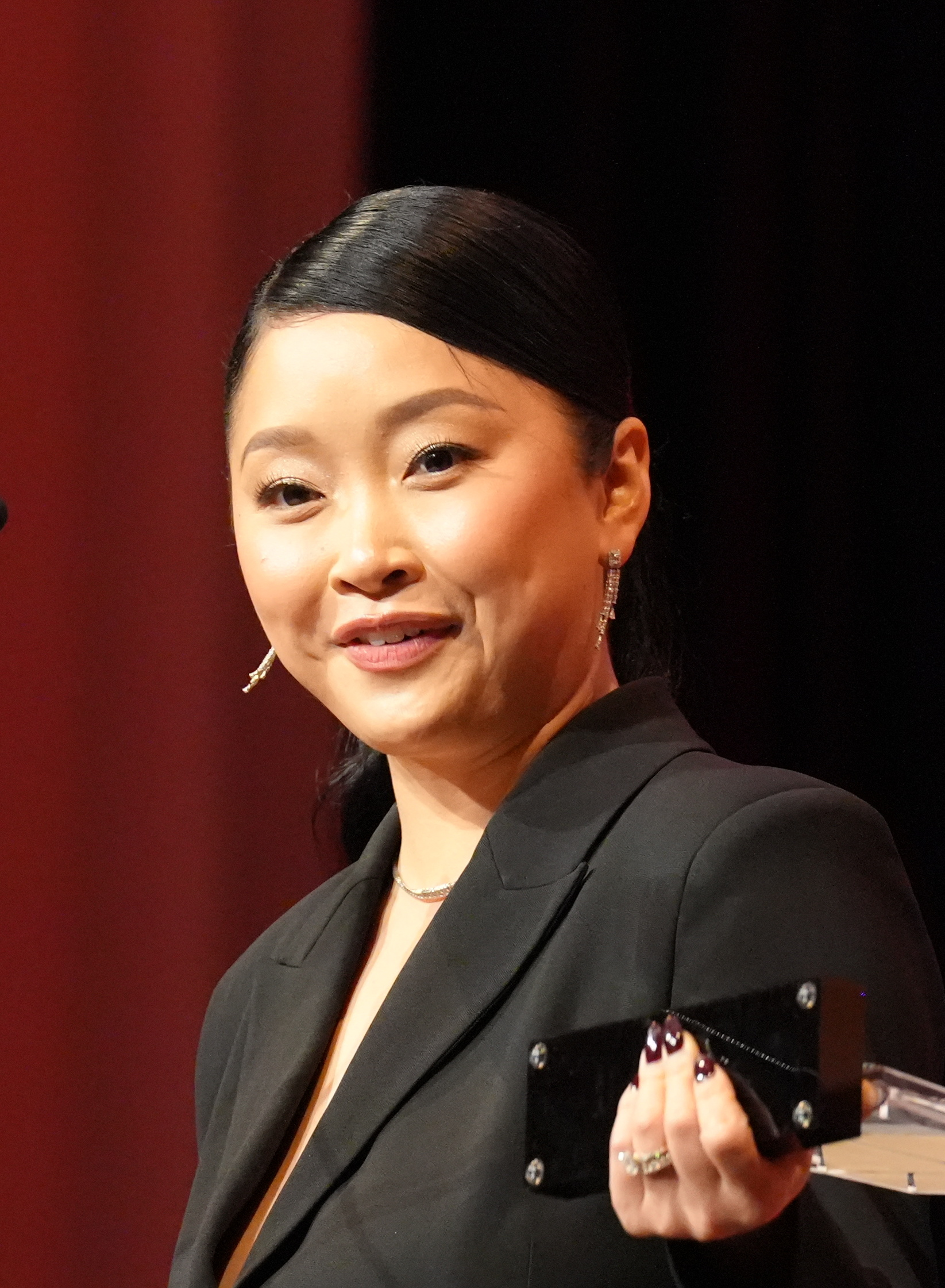
- Condor in 2026 at the APEX Gala
- Born: Trần Đồng Lan; May 11, 1997 (age 29); Cần Thơ, Vietnam
- Occupations: Actress; YouTuber
- Years active: 2014–present
- Spouse: Anthony De La Torre (m. 2024)

YouTube information
- Channel: Lana Condor
- Years active: 2019–present
- Subscribers: 766,000
- Views: 4 million
- Last updated: May 31, 2026

Lana Therese Condor (born Trần Đồng Lan; May 11, 1997) is an American actress. She made her acting debut starring as Jubilee in the superhero film X-Men: Apocalypse (2016). Her starring role portraying Lara Jean Covey in the romantic comedy To All the Boys franchise (2018–2021) brought her wide recognition. She portrayed Saya Kuroki in the television series Deadly Class, Koyomi in the film Alita: Battle Angel (both 2019) and voiced the titular character in the animated teen comedy film Ruby Gillman, Teenage Kraken (2023).

== Early life ==
Born in Vietnam, Condor lived her first months in an orphanage in Cần Thơ under the name Trần Đồng Lan. On October 6, 1997, she was adopted and renamed by American parents Mary Carol Condor (née Haubold; died July 2024) and Bob Condor in Chicago, Illinois. Condor has a brother, Arthur, who is three months older and was adopted from the same orphanage. Condor and her family lived in Whidbey Island, Washington, and New York City.

Condor studied ballet as a child, training with the Whidbey Island Dance Theater, Joffrey Ballet, the Rock School for Dance Education, and the Alvin Ailey American Dance Theater. She continued dancing with the Los Angeles Ballet, and also trained at the Groundlings in improvisational theatre. She studied acting at the New York Film Academy and Yale Summer Conservatory for Actors, and in 2014 was a theatre scholar at the California State Summer School for the Arts. As a high school freshman, she attended the Professional Performing Arts School in New York City, and graduated from Notre Dame Academy in Los Angeles in 2015. In 2016, she was accepted at Loyola Marymount University but chose to postpone it to pursue acting.

== Career ==
Condor made her acting debut as Jubilation Lee / Jubilee in Bryan Singer's 2016 superhero film X-Men: Apocalypse. That year, she also appeared in Peter Berg's drama film Patriots Day, which depicted the events and aftermath of the Boston Marathon bombing. In 2017, Condor co-starred in the Lifetime romantic thriller film High School Lover. The following year, she gained recognition for her lead role as Lara Jean Covey in Netflix's romantic drama film To All the Boys I've Loved Before, directed by Susan Johnson and based on Jenny Han's young adult novel of the same name. For the role, she was nominated for a Teen Choice Award.

In 2019, Condor portrayed the assassin Saya Kuroki in Syfy's action drama series Deadly Class, based on the Rick Remender comic book series of the same name. She also appeared as Koyomi in Robert Rodriguez's science fiction film Alita: Battle Angel based on the graphic novel series by Yukito Kishiro. Condor also voiced the character of Kaoru in the Netflix stop-motion animated series Rilakkuma and Kaoru (2019), guest starred as the voice of Casey McGarry in the Netflix series BoJack Horseman, and co-starred in the coming-of-age romantic comedy Summer Night (2019), directed by Joseph Cross.

In 2020, Condor reprised her role as Lara Jean Covey in To All the Boys: P.S. I Still Love You, directed by Michael Fimognari, the second installment of the film series. The following year, she reprised her role as Lara Jean Covey in To All the Boys: Always and Forever, the third and final installment of the trilogy. In February 2020, she launched a YouTube channel.

In 2022, Condor executive produced and starred in the lead role of high schooler Erika Vu in the Netflix comedy-drama series Boo, Bitch. That same year, she headlined the romantic sci-fi film Moonshot as Sophie Tsukino, alongside Cole Sprouse. She then voiced the title character in the animated film Ruby Gillman, Teenage Kraken for DreamWorks. In 2025, she portrayed army medic Stephanie Selby in the military thriller Valiant One. and Leah in the romantic-comedy Worth the Wait, an Asian-American version of Love Actually. In 2026, Condor starred as Princess in the action-thriller Pretty Lethal, starred as Max Leviton in The Devil's Mouth, and had a supporting role as Paige Avery in the Looney Tunes live-action comedy film Coyote vs. Acme, opposite Will Forte and John Cena.

== Personal life ==
Condor began a relationship with actor Anthony De La Torre in August 2015 shortly after they met at an Emmy Awards party. As of 2020, they lived together in Seattle. They got engaged in December 2021 while on vacation in Mexico, and married in 2024 in an intimate ceremony in Malibu, California.

== Filmography ==
Key
| † | Denotes films that have not yet been released |

=== Film ===
| Year | Title | Role | Notes |
|---|---|---|---|
| 2016 | X-Men: Apocalypse | Jubilation Lee / Jubilee | |
| 2016 | Patriots Day | Li | |
| 2018 | To All the Boys I've Loved Before | Lara Jean Covey | |
| 2019 | Alita: Battle Angel | Koyomi | |
| 2019 | Summer Night | Lexi | |
| 2020 | To All the Boys: P.S. I Still Love You | Lara Jean Covey | |
| 2021 | To All the Boys: Always and Forever | Lara Jean Covey | |
| 2022 | Moonshot | Sophie Tsukino | |
| 2023 | Ruby Gillman, Teenage Kraken | Ruby Gillman (voice) | |
| 2025 | Valiant One | Stephanie Selby | |
| 2025 | Worth the Wait | Leah | Also executive producer |
| 2026 | Pretty Lethal | Princess | |
| 2026 | The Devil's Mouth | Max Leviton | |
| 2026 | Coyote vs. Acme | Paige Avery | Filmed in 2023 |
| TBA | Whodunnit † | Tess Klein | Filming |

=== Television ===
| Year | Title | Role | Notes |
|---|---|---|---|
| 2017 | High School Lover | Allison | Television film |
| 2019 | Deadly Class | Saya Kuroki | Main role |
| 2019 | Rilakkuma and Kaoru | Kaoru | Main voice cast; English dub |
| 2019 | BoJack Horseman | Casey McGarry | Voice; 2 episodes |
| 2022 | Boo, Bitch | Erika Vu | Main role |
| 2024 | Abbott Elementary | Olivia | Guest role; 2 episodes |
| 2025 | Elsbeth | Peyton Ramsey | Episode: "Basket Case" |
| 2026 | XO, Kitty | Lara Jean Covey | Guest role; 3 episodes |

== Awards and nominations ==
| Year | Award | Category | Nominated work | Result | Ref. |
|---|---|---|---|---|---|
| 2019 | MTV Movie & TV Awards | Best Kiss (with Noah Centineo) | To All the Boys I've Loved Before | Won | |
| 2019 | Teen Choice Awards | Choice Drama Movie Actress | To All the Boys I've Loved Before | Nominated | |
| 2019 | Teen Choice Awards | Choice Movie Ship (with Noah Centineo) | To All the Boys I've Loved Before | Nominated | |
| 2020 | Hollywood Critics Association | Next Generation of Hollywood | Herself | Won | |
