= Madeleine Arthur =

Canadian actress (born 1997)

- Born: March 10, 1997 (age 29); Vancouver, British Columbia, Canada
- Occupation: Actress
- Years active: 2011–present

Madeleine Arthur (born March 10, 1997) is an American and Canadian actress. She is known for her roles as Mae in the Netflix suspense thriller series Devil in Ohio, Hannah Hadman in the workplace comedy series Blockbuster, and Christine in the To All the Boys film series.

== Early life ==
Arthur was born and raised in Vancouver, British Columbia, to Jane (née Walter) and Brian Arthur. She attended Sir Winston Churchill Secondary School, where she was voted as one of the co-valedictorians of her graduating class. Arthur was a competitive gymnast for 13 years before changing her focus to acting. She speaks fluent French.

== Career ==
=== 2010s ===
In 2011, Arthur began her television career as Meg in the horror-fantasy series The Haunting Hour: The Series in the episode "Dreamcatcher". She bagged a guest role in the action adventure series Spooksville in the episode "The No-Ones", she was nominated for the Young Actress Age 10-19 in a TV Series Drama or Comedy Guest Starring or Principal in 2014 Joey Awards. She had a recurring role on The CW sci-fi drama series The Tomorrow People in four episode, she won for Young Actress Age 15-19 in a TV Series Drama Supporting/Recurring in 2014 Joey Awards. She appeared as Jane Keane, the daughter of Amy Adams' character, in Tim Burton's biographical film Big Eyes.

In 2015, Arthur took on a supporting role in the thriller drama television movie Reluctant Witness portraying Becky Collins. In 2016, Arthur played the role of young version of Alison Pill's character Willa Warren in the thriller mystery series The Family.

In 2018, Arthur appeared on the third season of the Syfy fantasy series The Magicians, in which she played the recurring role of Fray Waugh. On the same year, Arthur was cast in the role of Christine in the Netflix teen romantic comedy film To All the Boys I've Loved Before. Her performance in the movie earned her a nomination for the Best Ensemble In a Feature Film in 2018 Joey Award.

In 2019, Arthur co-starred in the sci-fi horror movie Color Out of Space opposite Nicolas Cage, Joely Richardson, Brendan Meyer and Julian Hilliard, based on H. P. Lovecraft's 1927 short story of the same name, where she played the role of Lavinia Gardner.

=== 2020s ===
In early 2020, Arthur reprised her role in the teen romantic comedy movie To All the Boys: P.S. I Still Love You, the second installment in the To All the Boys film series, which was released on February 12, 2020 exclusively on Netflix. On the same year, she appeared on the first season of the TNT post-apocalyptic thriller series Snowpiercer.

In 2021, Arthur reprised her role in the third and final installment in the To All the Boys film series, To All the Boys: Always and Forever, which was released on February 12, 2021, by Netflix. On the same year, she bagged a recurring role in the sitcom series Chad, which featured her as Marjorie in two episodes. She was cast in the dark comedy series Guilty Party portraying Amber in five episodes, which was premiered on October 14, 2021 on Paramount+.

In 2022, Arthur was cast to play the main role of Mae in the suspense thriller limited series Devil in Ohio, based on Polatin's book of the same name for Netflix, released on September 2, 2022. Her performance in the television earned her a nomination for Best Lead Performance, Series in 2023 UBCP/ACTRA Awards in Vancouver, Canada. On the same year, she was cast in the main role of Hannah Hadman, a young employee of the store who is also Carlos's friend, in the workplace comedy series Blockbuster, which was premiered on Netflix on November 3, 2022.

In 2023, Arthur co-starred alongside Chris McNally and Julie Gonzalo in Hallmark comedy drama movie 3 Bed, 2 Bath, 1 Ghost, playing Ruby Baker.

== Filmography ==
=== Film ===
Year	Title	Role	Notes
2014	Grace: The Possession	Sally	
2014	Big Eyes	Jane Keane	
2015	The Wolf Who Came to Dinner	Cate Barkley	Short film
2017	Echo and Solomon	Echo	Short film
2018	To All the Boys I've Loved Before	Christine	
2019	Color Out of Space	Lavinia Gardner	
2020	To All the Boys: P.S. I Still Love You	Christine	
2021	To All the Boys: Always and Forever, Lara Jean	Christine	
2025	The Wrong Paris	Cindy	
TBA	Nutmeg & Mistletoe	Mistletoe	Post-production
TBA	White Elephant		Post-production

=== Television ===
Year	Title	Role	Notes
2011	The Haunting Hour: The Series	Meg	Episode: "Dreamcatcher"
2013	The Killing	Reddick's Daughter	Episode: "Reckoning"
2013	Spooksville	Tira Jones	Episode: "The No-Ones"
2014	The Tomorrow People	Charlotte Taylor	4 episodes
2015	Supernatural	Young Tina	Episode: "About a Boy"
2015	Reluctant Witness	Becky Collins	Television film
2016	The Family	Young Willa Warren	12 episodes
2018	Legends of Tomorrow	Nora Darhk	Episode: "Daddy Darhkest"
2018	The X-Files	Sarah Turner	2 episodes
2018	The Magicians	Fray Waugh	Recurring role; 5 episodes
2020	Snowpiercer	Nicolette 'Nikki' Genêt	5 episodes
2021	Chad	Marjorie	
2021	Guilty Party	Amber	5 episodes
2022	Devil in Ohio	Mae	Main role
2022	Blockbuster	Hannah Hadman	Main role; 10 episodes
2023	3 Bed, 2 Bath, 1 Ghost	Ruby Baker	Hallmark movie
2024	To Have and To Holiday	Celeste Palmer	Hallmark movie
2026	Elle	Lindsay	Episode: What, Like It's Hard

=== Web ===
Year	Title	Role	Notes
2020	Day by Day	Louise (voice)	Podcast series; episode: "This is No Title for This Story Yet"

== Awards and nominations ==
Year	Award	Category	Work	Result
2014	Joey Awards	Young Actress Age 10-19 in a TV Series Drama or Comedy Guest Starring or Principal	Spooksville	Nominated
2014	Joey Awards	Young Actress Age 15-19 in a TV Series Drama Supporting/Recurring	The Tomorrow People	Won
2018	Joey Awards	Best Ensemble In a Feature Film	To All the Boys I've Loved Before	Nominated
2022	UBCP/ACTRA Awards	Best Performance by a Female in a Short Drama	Love You, Mama	Nominated
2023	Leo Awards	Best Lead Performance, Series	Devil in Ohio	Nominated
