= The Wrong Paris =

American romantic comedy film

- Release poster
- Directed by: Janeen Damian
- Written by: Nicole Henrich
- Produced by: Brad Krevoy; Michael Damian
- Starring: Miranda Cosgrove; Pierson Fodé; Madison Pettis; Frances Fisher; Yvonne Orji; Torrance Coombs
- Cinematography: Graham Robbins
- Edited by: Scott Hill
- Music by: Nathan Lanier
- Production companies: MPCA; Brad Krevoy Productions
- Distributed by: Netflix
- Release date: September 12, 2025
- Running time: 107 minutes
- Country: United States
- Language: English

The Wrong Paris is a 2025 American romantic comedy film directed by Janeen Damian and starring Miranda Cosgrove and Pierson Fodé, with a supporting cast including Madison Pettis, Frances Fisher and Yvonne Orji.

The story follows Dawn, who is in need of money to pay for art school in Paris, France, joins a reality television dating show she believes is set there. However, she soon discovers the show actually takes place in Paris, Texas. While attempting to get eliminated, she unexpectedly develops feelings for the bachelor, Trey, complicating her plans.

It was released by Netflix on September 12, 2025.

== Plot ==
25-year-old aspiring artist Dawn lives in a small Texas town with her two sisters and grandmother Birdie, who became their legal guardian after the girls were orphaned. Dawn is thrilled to be accepted to an art school in Paris, but is short of funds for both years after spending some of her savings on Birdie's medical expenses.

A huge fan of dating reality show The Honeypot, Dawn's sister Emily talks her into auditioning for the show, as the contestants' appearance fee would help cover her studies. Dawn reluctantly accepts to attend an audition and is surprised to learn she is cast for the upcoming season, which will be taking place in Paris. Later, the two sisters go out for a drink and to play pool to celebrate, where Dawn connects with an immaculately dressed cowboy.

When Dawn embarks on the plane with the other contestants, they are dismayed to find out the season's twist once they land; the location is set on a ranch in Paris, Texas, a town not far from Dawn's home. Arriving at Silver Spur Ranch, they are told they will meet the bachelor Trey McAllen III the next day. Dawn runs into him in a barn, where he is revealed to be the cowboy she met with her sister.

Dawn asks to be removed from the competition, as the allure of the show for her is ruined because it is the "wrong" Paris. However, the show's producer Rachel reminds her that her contract stipulates that she will not be paid if she quits the show. Dawn feels confident she can get rejected on purpose at the first barbecue event, as ten women will be eliminated right after. Talking very familiarly with Trey on camera, Rachel determines their previous encounters were brief enough to not create a conflict of interest. Dawn is also foiled by Trey himself, who has taken an interest in her.

Reluctantly drawn to Trey and still motivated by the prize money, Dawn learns through fellow competitor Jasmine that she can earn extra money by securing dates with him. This leads Dawn to actively compete on the show. Winning the axe throw, she cooks with Trey on their date. At the obstacle course, the six remaining women end up fighting.

When the ranch's horses break free during the challenge, Trey and Dawn become closer, as she volunteers to help find them. That night, the two sneak away from the farm for a free day from the cameras, and hook up. Later, driving to her house, Trey sees her metal sculptures and meets her family. However, their blossoming romance hits a snag after Dawn's rival Lexi proves to Trey that she only did the show to get money to study in Paris, so a heartbroken Trey eliminates Dawn.

Dawn shortly starts attending art school in Paris, but Rachel tracks her down and urges her to reveal her feelings to Trey. Given a gown, Dawn shows up to the final location, where Lexi and Jasmine are kept away. Despite initially refusing Dawn's apology, Trey realizes her sincerity upon discovering she forfeited all she had earned on the show to see him again.

After Trey and Dawn formally reunite, he suggests she reject him live on camera so she can secure the $250,000 "honeypot". Dawn takes the money and immediately kisses Trey. Photos in the credits show the pair making their relationship work while she studies in France.

== Cast ==
- Miranda Cosgrove as Dawn, an aspiring artist who goes on the dating reality show The Honeypot for the money and is not looking for love
- Pierson Fodé as Trey McAllen, the lead on The Honeypot
- Madison Pettis as Lexi Miller, a famous influencer on The Honeypot and Dawn's rival
- Frances Fisher as Birdie, Dawn's grandmother
- Yvonne Orji as Rachel, a producer on The Honeypot who sees in Dawn the potential to win
- Madeleine Arthur as Cindy aka 'Cinderella', a contestant on The Honeypot
- Torrance Coombs as Carl, the head producer of The Honeypot
- Christin Park as Jasmine, a scientist from Chicago and Dawn's roommate on The Honeypot
- Emilija Baranac as Emily, Dawn's sister
- Hannah Stocking as Eve, a contestant on The Honeypot
- Naika Toussaint as Amber, a contestant on The Honeypot
- Veronica Long as Heather, a contestant on The Honeypot
- Ava Bianchi as Maxine, Dawn's sister
- Hugo Ateo as Jesus
- Eric Cole Smith as Oscar
- William Wilder as Levi
- Kaden Connors as Stephen
- Harry Jowsey as Jimmy

== Production ==
Janeen Damian is director of the film for Netflix, from a script by Nicole Henrich. Producers on the film include Brad Krevoy for MPCA and Michael Damian.

The cast is led by Miranda Cosgrove and Pierson Fodé and also includes Torrance Coombs, Madison Pettis, Frances Fisher and Yvonne Orji as well as Hannah Stocking, Naika Toussaint, Christin Park, Madeleine Arthur, Veronica Long, Emilija Baranac and Ava Bianchi.

Principal photography took place in Vancouver, and Agassiz, British Columbia in September and October 2024. The production encountered difficult terrain and weather conditions, including a muddy wrestling scene filmed in the rain, which cast and crew later recalled in anecdotes.

== Reception ==
On the review aggregator website Rotten Tomatoes, 67% of 15 critics' reviews are positive.

The film received mixed reviews from critics. Adrian Horton of The Guardian described the film as technically flawed and emotionally uninvolving, faulting it for poor editing, awkward camerawork, and lack of chemistry between leads, labeling it regressive in romantic ideals rather than endearing. In a review for India Today Priyanka Sharma called it a glossy, cheeky guilty-pleasure with limited depth, recommending it mainly for teens or hopeless romantics. RogerEbert.com echoed similar sentiments, describing The Wrong Paris as “flimsy and forgettable,” lacking the tension or emotional investment necessary to engage audiences meaningfully.

Tara Watson of Mamamia praised the film as the ideal comfort-watch rom-com: predictable yet vivacious, full of cheesy fun and strong self-awareness. She said it embraces its own silliness and delivers pure escapist joy. Jason Flatt of ButWhyTho.net commended the film’s self-awareness and effective use of romantic tropes. Despite minor visual issues like CGI and lens flares, the reviewer felt the emotional elements—particularly Dawn’s autonomy and the sincerity of Trey—softened typical clichés. A review in CineBlender praised the ending, calling it emotionally honest and thoughtfully subversive of reality-TV tropes. Instead of a spectacle, the conclusion centers real choice and mutual respect, reinforcing the film’s self-aware tone. Martin Shore of Tom’s Guide, while acknowledging the film’s weak editing and formulaic structure, found it a "guilty pleasure" that plays well for fans of whimsical Netflix rom-coms, largely due to Cosgrove’s charm in comedic scenes.
