= Matt Kaplan =

American film producer (born 1984)

- Kaplan at the 2011 Whistler Film Festival in Whistler north of Vancouver, Canada
- Born: Matthew Kaplan; April 14, 1984 (age 42); California, U.S.
- Education: Columbia University (BA)
- Occupations: Film producer; businessman
- Years active: 2007–present
- Spouses: Claire Holt (m. 2016; div. 2017) Alexandra Cooper (m. 2024)
- Children: 1

Matthew Kaplan (born April 14, 1984) is an American film producer. He is known for producing young adult films, particularly the To All the Boys (2018–present) film series. He is the founder and CEO of Ace Entertainment and former president of Awesomeness Films.

== Education and films ==
Kaplan grew up in Los Angeles. He said that growing up, his passions were "football and movies". He graduated from Columbia University in Manhattan, New York. He was a quarterback on the Columbia Lions football team.

After college, he was hired by CBS President and CEO Les Moonves as an intern and became director of digital development for the company. He jumped to Lionsgate Films, rising to SVP Development and Production, overseeing projects including They Came Together and The Hunger Games. Kaplan founded Chapter One Films in 2013 and signed a first-look deal with Blumhouse Productions to produce movies including The Darkness and The Lazarus Effect. In 2015, Jeffrey Katzenberg chose him to head the film division of Awesomeness.

Kaplan began Ace Entertainment in 2017, producing the film To All the Boys I've Loved Before and its sequels.

In 2026, reports emerged that he and Alex Cooper created a hostile work environment at Unwell Network.

== Personal life ==
From 2001 to 2004, while attending Columbia University, Kaplan dated actress/designer Ashley Olsen. In 2016, he married Australian actress Claire Holt. He filed for divorce a day before their anniversary in 2017.

He and Alexandra Cooper, the host of podcast Call Her Daddy, were engaged in March 2023. They married on April 6, 2024. In May 2026, Kaplan announced that he and Cooper were expecting their first child.

== Filmography ==
=== Film ===
Producer

- The Lazarus Effect (2015)
- Visions (2015)
- Dance Camp (2016)
- Shovel Buddies (2016)
- The Darkness (2016)
- Before I Fall (2017)
- Stephanie (2017)
- You Get Me (2017)
- Irreplaceable You (2018)
- To All the Boys I've Loved Before (2018)
- The Perfect Date (2019)
- To All the Boys: P.S. I Still Love You (2020)
- Body Cam (2020)
- Spontaneous (2020)
- To All the Boys: Always and Forever (2021)
- Hello, Goodbye, and Everything In Between (2022)
- Love at First Sight (2022)
- Love in Taipei (2023)
- I Wish You All the Best (2025)

=== Television ===
Executive producer

- Clark and Michael (2007)
- Ascension (2014)
- They Came Together (2014)
- My Dead Ex (2018)
- Are You Afraid of the Dark? (2019–2021)
- XO, Kitty (2023-2025)
- Let's Marry Harry (2026)
