= P.S. I Still Love You =

Book by Jenny Han

- Author: Jenny Han
- Language: English
- Genre: Young adult
- Publisher: Simon & Schuster
- Publication date: May 26, 2015
- Publication place: United States
- Media type: Print (hardback, paperback)
- Pages: 337
- ISBN: 978-1442426740
- Preceded by: To All the Boys I've Loved Before
- Followed by: Always and Forever, Lara Jean

P.S. I Still Love You is a 2015 young adult romance novel by American author Jenny Han, first published by Simon & Schuster and released on May 26, 2015. It is the sequel to the novel To All the Boys I've Loved Before, released on April 15, 2014, and was followed by a third installment, Always and Forever, Lara Jean, released on May 2, 2017.

A film adaptation of the book titled To All the Boys: P.S. I Still Love You was released on February 12, 2020, on Netflix. It is a direct sequel to To All the Boys I've Loved Before.

== Plot ==
After the fight between Lara Jean, Josh and Peter at the Coveys' Christmas party, Lara Jean realizes that she has fallen for Peter. Hoping to reconcile, Lara Jean heads over to Peter's house with a love letter she hopes for him to read. After a brief talk, the two almost kiss but his brother interrupts and then they decide they want to be a real couple. At school, Lara Jean discovers that someone has posted a video of her and Peter making out in the hot tub from the ski trip. A rumor spreads that the two were having sex. After seeing the video during school, Peter is furious and warns the anonymous poster not to mess with Lara Jean.

Before Margot leaves to go back to college in Scotland, she tells Lara Jean to get a job. Taking Margot's advice, but not wanting to work at the hospital gift shop like her dad suggested, Lara Jean makes up a story on how she's volunteering to start a scrapbooking class at the Belleview retirement home. Not wanting her family to find out the truth, Lara Jean goes to get the job and ends up liking it. She gets closer to Stormy, an elderly woman who has a feisty temper. Stormy gives Lara Jean relationship advice, though it usually contradicts with Lara Jean's thoughts. Meanwhile, Kitty begins an attempt to set up their father with the neighbor across the street, Trina Rothschild.

One day, Lara Jean receives a letter in the mail from John Ambrose McClaren, telling her that he received the love letter she wrote him. Lara Jean and John soon become pen pals. When Lara Jean learns that her and her friends' favorite childhood spot, the neighborhood tree house, is being torn down, she decides to throw a reunion party for the old gang, inviting Peter, John and Chris to dig up a time capsule they buried together in seventh grade.

At the tree house party, Peter brings his ex-girlfriend, Genevieve, knowing that Lara Jean did not want her to come. Lara Jean also finds out that the two were hanging out before the party, prompting her to become suspicious, and a little jealous, of Peter and Genevieve's "relationship". During the party, Lara Jean distracts herself from Peter by focusing on John. The group takes it in turn to pull an item from the time capsule and then decide to play Assassins, which they often played during their childhood. For the prize, they decide the winner will be granted one wish. Lara Jean is determined to win since she has never previously won a game.

After the party, Lara Jean and Peter argue about John and Genevieve, and Peter insists there is only friendship between him and his ex. During the Assassins game, Lara Jean discovers that Peter and Genevieve have formed an alliance, causing her to become suspicious again. Lara Jean finds out that Stormy is John's grandmother when he comes to visit the retirement home, and also eliminates him from Assassins. Her next target is now Peter, and John decides to help her out.

Meanwhile, Lara Jean and Peter break up when she discovers that Peter knew Genevieve was the person who sent out the video from the hot tub. She tells him if she wins Assassins, she would wish that nothing had happened between them. Lara Jean begins spending more time with John as they scheme to take out Genevieve from the game. Lara Jean ends up winning, and discovers the reason Peter and Genevieve have been hanging out: Genevieve confided in Peter about her father's affair with a younger woman.

Lara Jean meets with Peter at the tree house the night before it is to be cut down. She tells him her wish is for things to go back to the way they were between them, and Peter confesses his love for her.

== Reception ==
The novel spent five weeks on The New York Times Best Seller list, peaking at #2 in the Young Adult fiction section.
