= Michael Fimognari =

American cinematographer and director

- Born: June 26, 1974 (age 52); Pittsburgh, Pennsylvania, U.S.
- Education: USC School of Cinematic Arts
- Occupations: Cinematographer, director
- Years active: 1999–present

Michael Fimognari (born June 26, 1974) is an American cinematographer and director.

== Early life and education ==
Fimognari was born in Pittsburgh, Pennsylvania, and graduated from Pennsylvania State University before receiving a master's degree in cinematography from the USC School of Cinematic Arts in 2002.

== Career ==
Fimognari is better known for his collaboration with Mike Flanagan.

== Filmography ==
=== Feature film ===
Year	Title	Director	Notes
2004	Knots	Greg Lombardo	
2004	Fighting Tommy Riley	Eddie O'Flaherty	
2006	Think Tank	Brian Petersen	
2006	Unrest	Jason Todd Ipson	
2007	Black Irish	Brad Gann	
2007	Everybody Wants to Be Italian	Jason Todd Ipson	
2007	The Neighbor	Eddie O'Flaherty	
2008	Shuttle	Edward Anderson	
2008	Yonkers Joe	Robert Celestino	
2009	Dare	Adam Salky	
2010	Au Revoir Taipei	Arvin Chen	
2010	Brotherhood	Will Canon	
2010	Beautiful Boy	Shawn Ku	
2010	The Last Harbor	Paul Epstein	
2011	Leave	Robert Celestino	
2011	96 Minutes	Aimée Lagos	
2012	The Millionaire Tour	Inon Shampanier	
2012	Crawlspace	Josh Stolberg	
2012	Tomorrow You're Gone	David Jacobson	
2013	Oculus	Mike Flanagan	1st collaboration with Flanagan
2014	10 Cent Pistol	Michael C. Martin	
2014	Jessabelle	Kevin Greutert	
2015	Demonic	Will Canon	
2015	The Lazarus Effect	David Gelb	
2015	Visions	Kevin Greutert	
2016	Misconduct	Shintaro Shimosawa	
2016	The Cleanse	Bobby Miller	
2016	Before I Wake	Mike Flanagan	
2016	Abattoir	Darren Lynn Bousman	
2016	Ouija: Origin of Evil	Mike Flanagan	
2017	Before I Fall	Ry Russo-Young	
2017	Gerald's Game	Mike Flanagan	
2018	Fast Color	Julia Hart	
2018	To All the Boys I've Loved Before	Susan Johnson	
2019	Doctor Sleep	Mike Flanagan	
2020	To All the Boys: P.S. I Still Love You	Himself	
2021	To All the Boys: Always and Forever	Himself	Also executive producer
2025	Jingle Bell Heist	Himself	Also executive producer
2026	The Last Kiss	Yoko Okumura	Also producer
2027	The Exorcist: Martyrs	Mike Flanagan	Post-production

=== Short film ===
Year	Title	Director	Notes
2000	The Day Before	Ann LeSchander	With Carolina Vila
2002	Casablanca	Mike Saenz	With Matthew Heckerling
2002	Issaquena	Lance Hammer	
2002	American Gulag	Dagen Merrill	
2002	Vacation	Barbara Stepansky	
2002	Sit and Spin	Kevin Burke	
2002	The Ultimate Documentary	Chris Perkel	Documentary short
2004	2+1	Philippe Safir	
2004	Restive Planet	John Cregan	
2004	The First Vampire: Don't Fall for the Devil's Illusions	Jason Todd Ipson	
2004	Code	Chad Galster	
2008	Elevator People Bring You Up; When You're Feeling Down	Nicholas Dunlevy	
2009	Le chat est mort	Lynne Moses	
2010	The Locked Room	John Henry Richardson	
2011	On Sunday Morning	Michaela Hughes	
2014	Farewell My King	Christian Gossett	

=== Documentary film ===
Year	Title	Director	Notes
2006	Going to Pieces: The Rise and Fall of the Slasher Film	Jeff McQueen	With Armando Salas

=== Television ===
Year	Title	Director	Notes
2010-2011	Backwash	Danny Leiner	
2022	The Midnight Club	Himself	Episodes "The Wicked Heart" and "Gimme a Kiss"

=== Television film ===
Year	Title	Director
2016	Untitled Paranormal Project	David Nutter
2017	The Hunted	Loni Peristere

=== Miniseries ===
Year	Title	Director	Notes
2018	The Haunting of Hill House	Mike Flanagan	
2021	Midnight Mass	Mike Flanagan	Also co-producer
2023	The Fall of the House of Usher	Mike Flanagan; Himself	Also executive producer
2026	Carrie	Mike Flanagan; Various	Also producer

=== Web series ===
Year	Title	Director
2012	The Walking Dead: Cold Storage	Greg Nicotero
2013	The Walking Dead: The Oath	Greg Nicotero
