= To All the Boys: Always and Forever =

2021 film directed by Michael Fimognari

- Film poster
- Directed by: Michael Fimognari
- Screenplay by: Katie Lovejoy
- Based on: Always and Forever, Lara Jean by Jenny Han
- Produced by: Matt Kaplan
- Starring: Lana Condor; Noah Centineo; Janel Parrish; Anna Cathcart; Ross Butler; Madeleine Arthur; Emilija Baranac; Trezzo Mahoro; Kelcey Mawema; Sofia Black-D'Elia; Henry Thomas; Sarayu Blue; John Corbett
- Cinematography: Michael Fimognari
- Edited by: Michelle Harrison; Joe Klotz; Tamara Meem
- Music by: Joe Wong
- Production companies: Awesomeness Films; Ace Entertainment
- Distributed by: Netflix
- Release date: February 12, 2021
- Running time: 115 minutes
- Country: United States
- Language: English

To All the Boys: Always and Forever is a 2021 American teen romantic comedy film directed by Michael Fimognari and written by Katie Lovejoy. The film stars Lana Condor and Noah Centineo. The film is based on Jenny Han's 2017 novel Always and Forever, Lara Jean and is a sequel to To All the Boys: P.S. I Still Love You (2020), and the third and final installment in the To All the Boys film series. A spin-off series titled XO, Kitty was released on May 18, 2023.

It was released on February 12, 2021, by Netflix. Like its predecessors, it was met with positive reviews.

== Plot ==
Lara Jean Song-Covey, accompanied by her sisters, Kitty and Margot; her father, Dan; and her neighbor and father's girlfriend Trina Rothschild, visits Seoul for spring break. She reconnects with the memory of her mother by searching for a lock her mother had left on a bridge to memorialize her love for Dan. They finally manage to read her accompanying message, which says "for the rest of my life."

Returning home, Lara Jean mentions to her boyfriend, Peter Kavinsky, that the two of them never had a meet-cute, to Peter's surprise, as he remembers their first meeting quite well. They do not have a song either, so he starts brainstorming songs. Lara Jean nervously waits for the result of her Stanford University application so she can attend college with Peter. She has also applied to the University of California, Berkeley and NYU.

Dan proposes to Trina, and as the family begins to plan the upcoming wedding, they decide the three sisters will be the bridesmaids. Lara Jean is disappointed when she is rejected by Stanford. So, the dream she has had of her future with Peter seems to vanish.

A wrongly sent text to Peter makes him believe that Lara Jean got in, so he shows up in full Stanford regalia, overjoyed. Then he whisks her off to their favorite diner to celebrate. Lara Jean keeps trying to tell him, but he interrupts with a promposal. The next day, wanting to avoid telling Peter she plans to play hooky from school, when she gets an acceptance letter from Berkeley.

On their senior trip to New York City, Lara Jean finally tells Peter about the mix up. Peter takes the news well, and the two remain confident that they can make their relationship work since Berkeley is only around an hour away from Stanford by car. The next day, Lara Jean and her friend Chris get invited to a NYU party which she enjoys immensely, finding herself drawn to the city and the university's program.

Back home, on a date night with Lara Jean, Peter's formerly absentee father reaches out to him, proposing they try to reconnect over a meal despite the years of his absence. Shortly thereafter, she discovers that she has also gotten into NYU. Lara Jean is torn between going there and the plan she and Peter had made, but she ultimately chooses NYU.

Peter's disappointment at Lara Jean's decision is palpable. Although the evening of prom initially starts out well, she cannot shake a feeling of impending doom. Lara Jean invites Peter up to her room afterwards, planning to finally lose her virginity. She also gives him a box of their mementos before. Believing her gestures are signs of their farewell, Peter breaks up with her to save himself from what he sees as the inevitable failure of a long-distance relationship.

Respecting Lara Jean's wishes, Peter skips Dan and Trina's wedding. Instead, he meets up with his estranged father over coffee. His father apologizes to Peter for his absence, saying that one should do whatever it takes for the person they love, causing Peter to realize that he should be doing the same for Lara Jean.

After the wedding festivities, Kitty conspires with Peter to set up a meeting between him and Lara Jean under the wedding tent. She finds a letter in her yearbook from him containing his account of their first meeting in sixth grade and a proposed contract to always love each other despite the 3,000 miles (4,800 km) between Stanford and NYU. Peter walks in and asks Lara Jean to sign it, to which she joyfully assents. They dance to a song Lara Jean had heard at the NYU party, with Peter agreeing that it is indeed their song.

The film ends with Lara Jean's reflection on wanting what she has with Peter, regardless of what films say and what stereotypes say about long-distance relationships. She remains optimistic that the distance will offer them the opportunity to write long love letters to one another.

== Cast ==
- Lana Condor as Lara Jean, a high school student and Peter's girlfriend
  - Momona Tamada as young Lara Jean
- Noah Centineo as Peter, Lara Jean's boyfriend and a popular lacrosse player
  - Rian McCririck as young Peter
- Janel Parrish as Margot, Lara Jean's mature and responsible older sister who goes to college in Scotland
- Anna Cathcart as Kitty, Lara Jean's playful little sister who got her and Peter together
- John Corbett as Dr. Covey, Lara Jean's kind and somewhat protective father
- Sarayu Blue as Trina Rothschild, the Coveys' friendly neighbor who is engaged to marry Lara Jean's dad
- Madeleine Arthur as Christine, Gen's cousin and Lara Jean's best friend (who goes by "Chris")
- Ross Butler as Trevor, Peter and Lara Jean's good friend and Chris' on-and-off boyfriend
- Emilija Baranac as Genevieve, a pretty and popular girl who is Peter's ex-girlfriend, and Lara Jean's best-friend-turned-rival (who goes by "Gen")
- Trezzo Mahoro as Lucas, Lara Jean's gay and amiable friend as well as one of her former love interests
- Kelcey Mawema as Emily, Gen's friend
- Sofia Black-D'Elia as Heather
- Henry Thomas as Mr. Kavinsky, Peter's father
- Jeon Ho-Young as Dae, Kitty's boyfriend in South Korea

== Production ==
The producers began work on Always and Forever while P.S. I Still Love You was still in production, hiring Katie Lovejoy to write the script off Han's third novel and Michael Fimognari to direct. Principal photography began in Vancouver, British Columbia, Canada on July 15, 2019, two months after production on the second film wrapped, although the production was formally announced only in August 2019.

== Soundtrack ==
The film's soundtrack, titled To All the Boys: Always and Forever (Music from the Netflix Film), was released digitally on February 12, 2021, by Capitol Records.

== Release ==
The film was released on February 12, 2021. It was the most-watched title in its debut weekend, and the fourth-most in its second weekend. Netflix reported that the film was watched by 51 million of households during its first quarter.

== Reception ==
Review aggregator website Rotten Tomatoes reports that 79% of 61 critics gave the film a positive review, with an average rating of 6.5/10. The website's critics consensus reads, "Diminishing returns have set in for this trilogy, but To All the Boys: Always and Forever has just enough of the original's effervescent charm to serve as a worthy conclusion." According to Metacritic, which sampled 17 critics and calculated a weighted average score of 65 out of 100, the film received "generally favorable reviews".
