= Always and Forever, Lara Jean =

2017 novel by Jenny Han

- Author: Jenny Han
- Language: English
- Genre: Fiction
- Publisher: Simon & Schuster
- Publication date: May 2, 2017
- Publication place: United States
- Media type: Print (hardback, paperback)
- Pages: 336
- ISBN: 978-1-4814-3048-7
- Preceded by: P.S. I Still Love You

Always and Forever, Lara Jean is a 2017 novel by American author Jenny Han, first published by Simon & Schuster and released on May 2, 2017. It is the third and final installment of the To All the Boys I've Loved Before trilogy, following To All the Boys I've Loved Before, released on April 15, 2014, and P.S. I Still Love You, released on May 26, 2015.

A film adaptation of the book titled To All the Boys: Always and Forever was released on Netflix on February 12, 2021. It is a direct sequel to the film adaptation of the second book P.S. I Still Love You.

== Plot ==
Now in her final year of high school, Lara Jean Song Covey is excitedly looking forward to attending school with her boyfriend, Peter Kavinsky, at the University of Virginia (UVA). Peter has been accepted early on a sports scholarship for lacrosse. When acceptance letters come in, Lara Jean learns she has been rejected. After being waitlisted to the University of North Carolina at Chapel Hill (UNC), Lara Jean decides to go with William and Mary with the plan of transferring to UVA after freshman year.

Meanwhile, Lara Jean's father continues to date their neighbor, Trina Rothschild. When Margot returns home from university in Scotland with her new boyfriend, Ravi, Lara Jean's father asks all of his daughters for their blessing to wed Trina. The sisters all agree, though Margot, who has not seen the progression of her father's relationship with Trina, is less excited and accepting than her sisters and thinks it won't work.

As Lara Jean finishes her senior year and settles into her new routine, adjusting to time spent without Peter and to Trina's presence in her home, she learns that UNC has taken her off the waitlist and accepted her. Her best friend Chris urges her to take a spontaneous road trip to the campus to see what she will be missing out on if she sticks to her plan. Lara Jean falls in love with the campus and decides to go to UNC, even though it is even farther away than William & Mary.

Everyone is happy to hear Lara Jean's news, except for Peter. At graduation, Lara Jean's father announces that he will be sending Lara Jean and her sisters with their grandmother to Korea for a month to connect with their heritage. Lara Jean acts excited but is secretly unhappy because it will cut into her dwindling days with Peter.

Lara Jean and her friends rent houses for Beach Week. While there, she decides to sleep with Peter for the first time. As they are about to have sex, Peter becomes uncomfortable and the two do not go through with it. When she returns home, Lara Jean meets with Peter's mother who tells her that Peter has started talking about transferring to UNC. She asks Lara Jean to consider breaking up with Peter so that he can have a good college experience.

At the bachelorette party for Trina, Lara Jean gets drunk for the first time and breaks up with Peter because she doesn't think long distance would work. When he asks her if she only wanted to have sex with him to neatly wrap up their relationship, she says yes. Peter is deeply hurt, and when Lara Jean sobers up she is devastated. Trina urges Lara Jean to reconsider and at her father's wedding, Lara Jean spots Peter and decides to approach him. She tells him that she loves him and wants to continue their relationship, to which he agrees. She also tells him she didn't mean what she said about neatly wrapping up their relationship by sleeping together; she wanted to do it because she genuinely loves him.

Despite not knowing what the future holds, Lara Jean and Peter decide to stay together. In Lara Jean's yearbook that Peter forgets to bring back, he writes a new contract between the two, echoing the contract drafted when they were fake dating in the first novel. The book ends with Lara Jean feeling confident that her relationship with Peter will last.
