= James Lassiter =

American film producer

- Occupation: Film producer
- Known for: Co-founder of Overbrook Entertainment

James Lassiter is an American film producer and talent agent. He served as the manager of American rapper and actor Will Smith before the two co-founded the production company Overbrook Entertainment in 1998. Also Smith's business partner, Lassiter has co-produced several films in which he starred. Prior, he founded Jarola Artist Management in 1991, and Brookside Artist Management in 2002 as sole proprietor.

== Career ==
Lassiter attended University of Miami and Temple University and befriended Jeffrey "Jazzy Jeff" Townes, who was in a rap duo with soon-to-be actor Will Smith. Lassiter became acquainted with Smith, and was named his road manager. Lassiter briefly worked with other companies including Handprint and The Firm, but ultimately shifted focus to managing Smith full time, also serving as his business partner.

Lassiter and Smith formed Overbrook Entertainment in 1998, a production company which has produced films including Hitch and ATL. While Overbrook had a deal with Universal Studios to produce films, none resulted, and the company was taken to Sony. The pair sought to market each of their productions to a different foreign market, promoting I, Robot in Russia and Ali in South Africa.

== Filmography ==
He was a producer in all films unless otherwise noted.

=== Film ===
Year	Film	Credit
2001	Ali	
2002	Showtime	Executive producer
2004	I, Robot	Executive producer
2004	Saving Face	
2005	Hitch	
2006	ATL	
2006	The Pursuit of Happyness	
2007	I Am Legend	
2008	Hancock	
2008	The Secret Life of Bees	
2008	The Human Contract	Executive producer
2008	Lakeview Terrace	
2008	Seven Pounds	
2010	The Karate Kid	
2012	This Means War	
2013	After Earth	
2014	Annie	
2018	Sprinter	
2019	Hala	
2020	Bad Boys for Life	Executive producer
2020	Charm City Kings	Executive producer
2020	Life in a Year	Executive producer
2021	King Richard	Executive producer
2021	The Harder They Fall	
2022	Emancipation	Executive producer
2023	The Book of Clarence	
TBA	Teddy	Executive producer

Music department

Year	Film	Role	Notes
1997	Booty Call	Executive music producer	
1997	Men in Black	Executive music producer	Uncredited

=== Television ===
Year	Title	Credit	Notes
1998	Getting Personal	Executive producer	
2000	Loose Cannon	Executive producer	Television pilot
2003−07	All of Us	Executive producer	
2013	The Queen Latifah Show		
2013	Styled to Rock	Executive producer	
2018−2025	Cobra Kai	Executive producer	
2020	The Fresh Prince of Bel-Air Reunion	Executive producer	Television special
2022	Bel-Air	Executive producer	

Thanks

Year	Title	Role	Notes
2016	StoryBots Super Songs	Special thanks	
2017	A StoryBots Christmas	Special thanks	Television special
2016−18	Ask the StoryBots	Special thanks	
