= Susan Johnson (filmmaker) =

American film producer and director

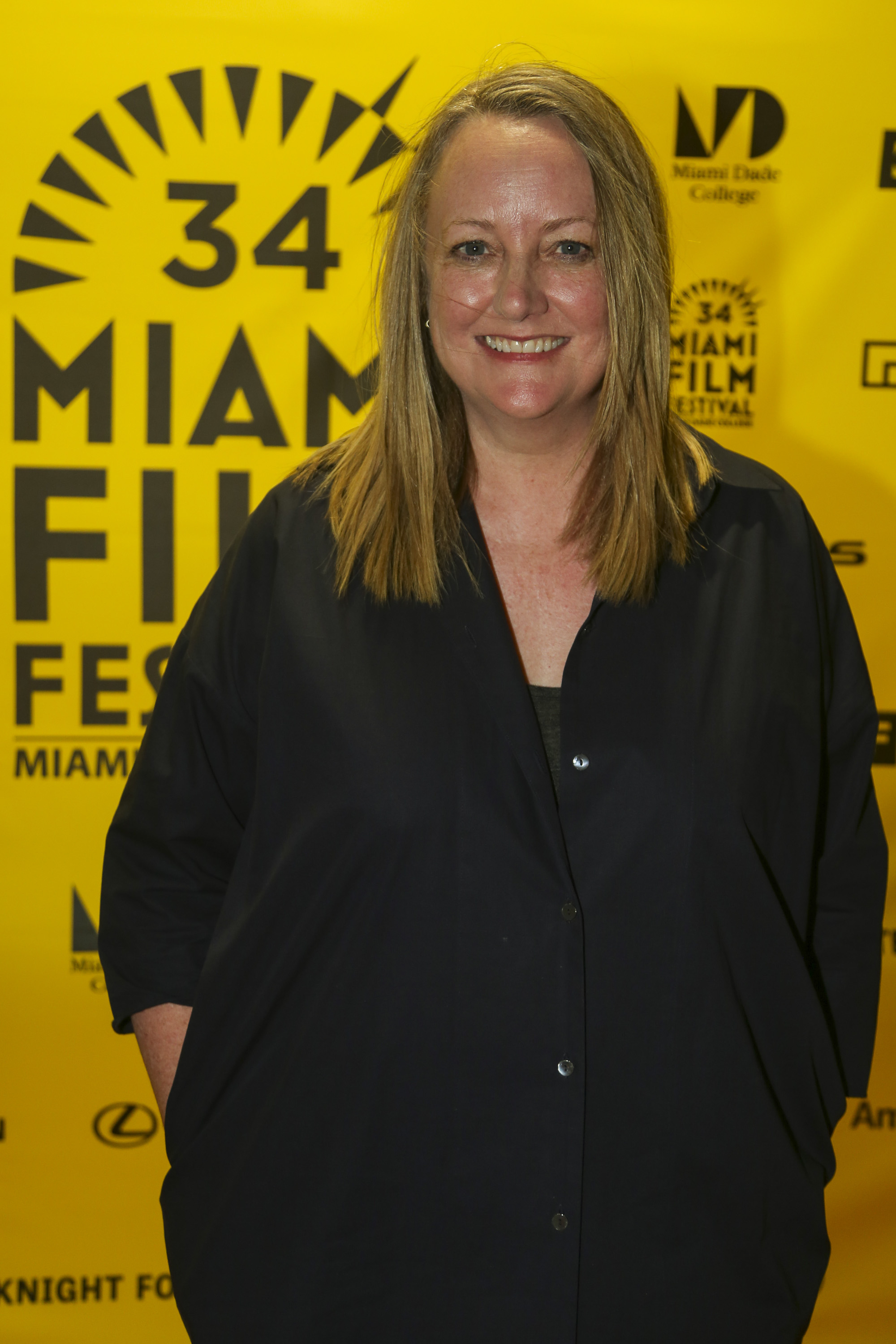
- Johnson in 2017
- Education: American Film Institute
- Occupations: Film producer Music video producer

Susan Johnson is an American film producer and director, known for directing the 2016 comedy film Carrie Pilby and the 2018 feature To All the Boys I've Loved Before.

== Early life and education ==
Johnson earned a full scholarship to the American Film Institute's Conservatory, from which she graduated in 2000 with a master's degree in directing. For her coursework, she directed three short films, Second Coming (1999), Call My Name (1999), and Destiny Stalled (2000).

== Career ==
Johnson began her career as an assistant for the William Morris Agency. In 1992, along with music journalist Kevin Murphy, she founded the music video production company Vendetta Films, which produced the music video for EMF's cover "Search and Destroy", from the Unexplained EP. The following year, she produced the music videos for four Gloria Estefan songs, including "Mi Tierra", "Con Los Años Que Me Quedan", from the album Mi Tierra. She directed Sara Evans videos "Three Chords and the Truth", "The Cryin’ Game", and "I Don’t Want To See The Light". In 1998 she directed The Warren Brothers' music video "Guilty", and the following year, she directed their music video "Better Man". In 1999, Johnson directed the music video for Mindy McCready's "All I Want Is Everything", from the album I'm Not So Tough.

Johnson began her film producing career with the coming-of-age film Mean Creek (2004), for which she won the Independent Spirit John Cassavetes Award and the Humanitas Prize. In 2005, she produced the drama Nearing Grace, starring Jordana Brewster, Gregory Smith, David Morse, and Ashley Johnson, from a script by Jacob Estes which was adapted from the Scott Sommer novel. The following year, Johnson produced the drama film Eye of the Dolphin (2006), starring Jane Lynch, Carly Schroeder, George Harris, Katharine Ross, and Adrian Dunbar.

In 2007, Johnson formed Braveart Films with actor Gregory Smith, and produced the comedy Wieners, starring Kenan Thompson and Darrell Hammond, Zachary Levi, Jenny McCarthy, Andy Milonakis, and Joel Moore. Johnson also produced the Eye of the Dolphin sequel, Beneath the Blue (2010), which starred Paul Wesley.

She made her directorial debut with the film adaptation of Caren Lissner's novel Carrie Pilby, starring Bel Powley, Nathan Lane, and Gabriel Byrne. The film premiered at the 2016 Toronto International Film Festival, chosen as one of 34 "Special Presentation Films." It was released by The Orchard in March of the following year, then began showing on Netflix in September, 2017. Johnson directed the 2018 film adaptation of Jenny Han's novel To All the Boys I've Loved Before, starring Lana Condor, John Corbett, and Janel Parrish. The film was released by Netflix.

== Filmography ==
Year	Title	Role
2004	Mean Creek	Producer
2005	Nearing Grace	Producer
2006	Eye of the Dolphin	Producer
2008	Wieners	Producer
2010	Beneath the Blue	Producer
2012	Eye of the Hurricane	Producer
2014	God Help the Girl	Co-executive producer
2016	Carrie Pilby	Director, producer
2016	Unleashed	Producer
2018	To All the Boys I've Loved Before	Director
