= Jenny Han =

American writer (born 1980)

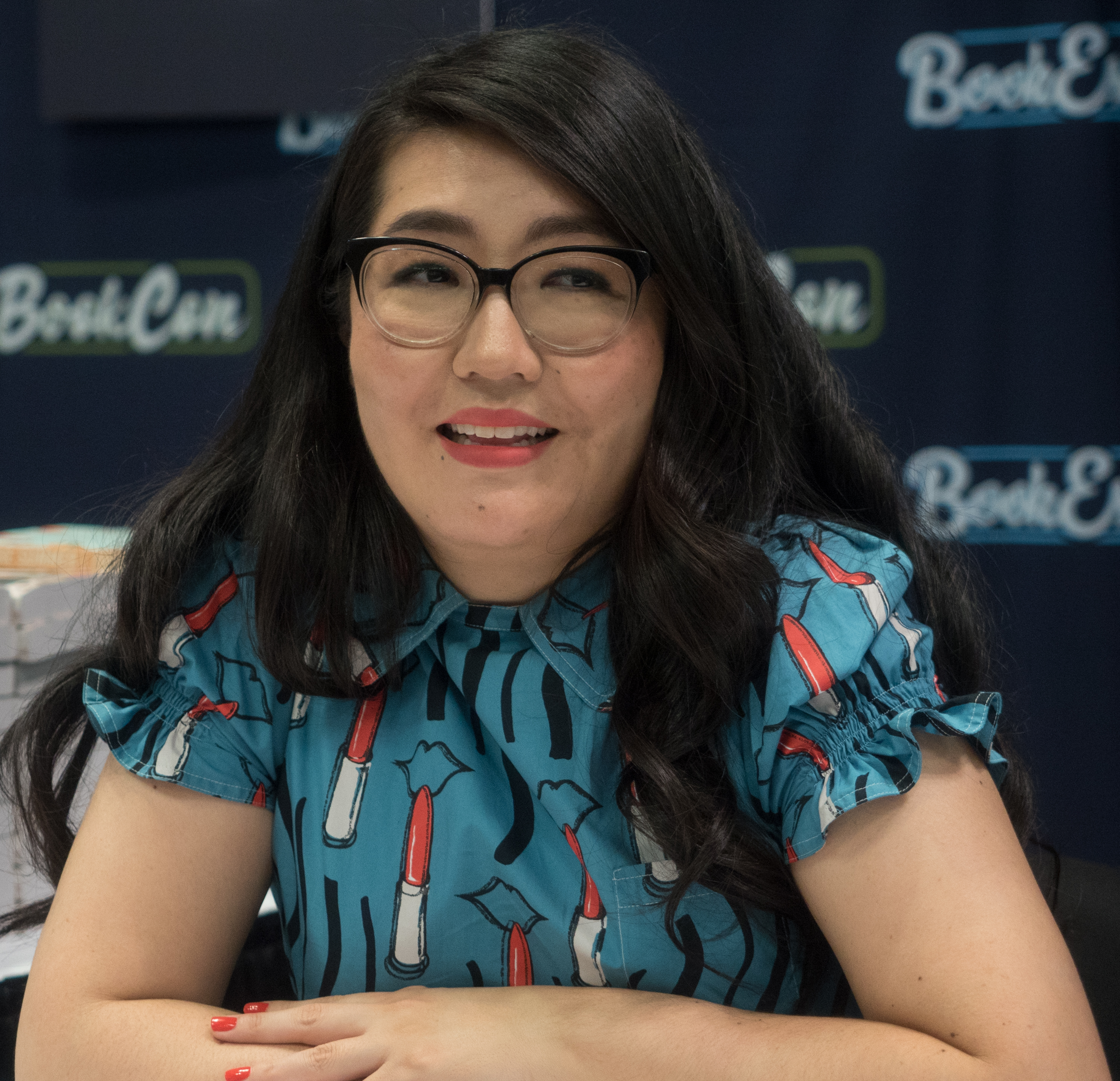
- Han at BookCon in June 2019
- Born: September 3, 1980 (age 46); Richmond, Virginia, U.S.
- Education: University of North Carolina at Chapel Hill (BA); The New School (MFA)
- Occupation: Author
- Writing career
- Years active: 2006–present
- Genre: Young adult fiction
- Notable works: The Summer I Turned Pretty; To All the Boys I've Loved Before
- Website: jennyhan.com

Jenny Han (born September 3, 1980) is an American author, screenwriter, producer, and showrunner. She is best known for writing The Summer I Turned Pretty trilogy, which she adapted into a namesake TV series on Amazon Prime Video. She also wrote the To All the Boys trilogy, which was adapted into a namesake film series by Netflix.

== Early life and education ==
Han was born and raised in Richmond, Virginia, to Korean-American parents. She graduated from Maggie L. Walker Governor's School for Government and International Studies in Richmond, Virginia, in 1998, then attended the University of North Carolina at Chapel Hill. In 2006, she received a Master of Fine Arts degree in creative writing from The New School in New York City.

== Career ==
=== Author ===
Han wrote her first book, the children's novel Shug, while she was in college. Shug was published in 2006 and is about Annemarie Wilcox, a twelve-year-old trying to navigate the perils of junior high school.

Her next project was a young adult romance trilogy about a girl's coming-of-age during her summer breaks. The three novels, The Summer I Turned Pretty, It's Not Summer Without You, and We'll Always Have Summer, were published from 2009 to 2011 by Simon & Schuster and quickly became New York Times Best Sellers. The trilogy is the story of Isabel "Belly" Conklin, who struggles to choose between two brothers she has known her whole life and works through a messy love triangle.

Han's second young adult trilogy was co-written with Siobhan Vivian and began with the 2012 publication of Burn for Burn. The novel follows three high school girls seeking revenge in their island town and contains paranormal and romance elements. The trilogy includes Fire with Fire, published in 2013, and Ashes to Ashes, published in 2014.

In 2014, Han released a young adult romance novel, To All the Boys I've Loved Before, about Lara Jean Song-Covey, a high school student whose life turns upside down when the letters she wrote to her five past crushes are mailed without her knowledge. The novel was optioned for a screen adaptation within weeks of its publication. The sequel, P.S. I Still Love You, was released the following year, and won the Young Adult 2015–2016 Asian/Pacific American Award for Literature. A third novel, Always and Forever, Lara Jean, was released in 2017.

=== TV and film ===
Han executive-produced the Netflix adaptation of her novel To All the Boys I've Loved Before, starring Lana Condor in the lead role, which began filming in July 2017 and was released by Netflix in August 2018, to positive reviews. Han had a brief cameo in the film. Han also executive-produced the sequel films To All the Boys: P.S. I Still Love You and To All the Boys: Always and Forever, which were released in 2020 and 2021.

In June 2022, The Summer I Turned Pretty was released on Amazon Prime Video. Han created the series, which is based on her book trilogy of the same title, and serves as showrunner and executive producer. Han had cameos in the first, second, and third seasons. The television adaptation was noteworthy in part because there were a number of modifications to make the story more diverse. For example, in the book, Belly appears to be of European descent, as confirmed by the original book cover. In the television series, Belly is portrayed as biracial: her father is White and her mother is Korean-American. Additionally, one of Belly's love interests, Jeremiah Fisher, played by Gavin Casalegno, is depicted as openly bisexual in the television series, a characteristic not present in the books. The series was renewed for a second season before the first season was even released. The series was renewed for a third and final season, which premiered on Amazon Prime Video on July 16, 2025. On September 17, 2025, Han announced that a movie following the events of season 3 was greenlit by Prime.

In 2022, Han launched her production company, Jenny Kissed Me, after signing a multiyear deal with Amazon Prime Video. Of the deal, Jennifer Salke, Head of Amazon Studios, said "Not only is Jenny Han a beloved and best-selling author, but she has also brought her voice to screens around the world, speaking to her fans with an authentic voice that inspires, moves and entertains her huge and growing fan base. We are so excited to now be the home for Jenny and her fantastic work to come. I know our global prime audience will thank us." In 2023, Han was named one of the Top 50 TV Producers of the Year by Variety and was named to Adweek's Creative 100.

In May 2023, XO, Kitty, a spin-off television series to To All the Boys film series was released on Netflix. Han created the series and serves as writer, executive producer, and showrunner on the first season. The series follows Lara Jean's younger sister, Kitty Song-Covey, as she goes on her own journey to attend a prestigious high school in Seoul, South Korea. Season 1 was nominated for an Emmy for Best Teen Series. In June 2023, Netflix announced that XO, Kitty was renewed for season 2, which was released on January 16, 2025. In February 2025, Netflix announced that XO, Kitty was renewed for season 3, which was released on April 2, 2026.

== Works ==
Standalone novels:

- Shug (2006)
- Clara Lee and the Apple Pie Dream (2011)
- My True Love Gave to Me: Twelve Holiday Stories (2014)

The Summer I Turned Pretty trilogy:

- The Summer I Turned Pretty (2009)
- It's Not Summer Without You (2010)
- We'll Always Have Summer (2011)

Burn for Burn trilogy:

- Burn for Burn (2012)
- Fire with Fire (2013)
- Ashes to Ashes (2014)

To All The Boys I've Loved Before trilogy:

- To All the Boys I've Loved Before (2014)
- P.S. I Still Love You (2015)
- Always and Forever, Lara Jean (2017)

== Filmography ==
Year	Title	Credited as			Notes
Year	Title	Writer	Executive producer	Director	Notes
2018	To All the Boys I've Loved Before	No	Yes	No	Cameo as a teacher at the school dance
2020	To All the Boys: P.S. I Still Love You	No	Yes	No	Cameo as a teacher comforting a student during the school's choir performance
2021	To All the Boys: Always and Forever	No	Yes	No	Cameo as a teacher at the awards ceremony
2022–2025	The Summer I Turned Pretty	Yes	Yes	Yes	Creator, wrote 4 episodes and directed "Last Dance"; Appeared in cameo as background character
2023–present	XO, Kitty	Yes	Yes	No	Creator, co-wrote "XO"; Appeared in cameo as airport gate agent
