= The Summer I Turned Pretty =

The Summer I Turned Pretty may refer to:

- The Summer I Turned Pretty (trilogy), a 2009–2011 young-adult novel series by Jenny Han, or the first novel in the series
- The Summer I Turned Pretty (TV series), a 2022–2025 American series based on the trilogy
