= Minnie Mills =

American actress

- Born: January 21, 2002 (age 24); London, England
- Occupations: Actress, Model
- Years active: 2022–present
- Known for: The Summer I Turned Pretty

Minnie Mills (born January 21, 2002) is a British-born Canadian-American model and actress best known for her role as Shayla in the television series The Summer I Turned Pretty, based on the novel of the same name by Jenny Han.

== Early life ==
Mills was born in London and currently resides in New York. Her father is Canadian and her mother is South Korean. She attended Columbia University, majoring in Behavioral and Biomedical Neuroscience.

Since an early age, Mills has been a strong advocate for the human rights of North Korean citizens and has worked closely with the organization Liberty in North Korea.

== Career ==
In 2021, Mills landed her first role in television, starring in the Amazon Prime Video series The Summer I Turned Pretty. Mills' character, Shayla, did not appear in the book trilogy upon which the television series was based, and the role was written exclusively for Mills. The series premiered in 2022. In April 2023, Mills announced that she would not be returning to the series for season two. Jenny Han, the show creator and author of the book series later stated that Mill's character was written out of the show because the timeline in season two did not allow them to keep all of the characters from season one.

In October 2022, Mills was cast as Jen Yung in the Netflix series Obliterated. The series was cancelled after one season.

In February 2023, Mills starred in an audio rom-com series titled Dump Him!.

== Filmography ==
=== Television ===
Year	Title	Role
2022	The Summer I Turned Pretty	Shayla
2023	Obliterated	Jen Yung

=== Film ===
Year	Title	Role
2025	Wait, Your Car? (short)	
2026	California Scenario	Lexi

=== Audio ===
Year	Title	Role
2025	Dump Him!	Ruby
