= Untitled The Summer I Turned Pretty film =

Upcoming film by Jenny Han

- Directed by: Jenny Han
- Written by: Jenny Han; Sarah Kucserka
- Based on: The Summer I Turned Pretty by Jenny Han
- Produced by: Jenny Han; Sarah Kucserka; Karen Rosenfelt
- Starring: Lola Tung; Christopher Briney; Gavin Casalegno
- Production companies: Amazon MGM Studios; wiip; Sunswept Entertainment
- Distributed by: Amazon MGM Studios (via Prime Video)
- Country: United States
- Language: English

The untitled The Summer I Turned Pretty film is an upcoming American romantic drama film directed by Jenny Han and written by Han and Sarah Kucserka. It is a follow-up film to the Amazon Prime Video television series The Summer I Turned Pretty (2022–2025) based on Han's novel trilogy of the same name. The film stars Lola Tung, Christopher Briney and Gavin Casalegno reprising their roles from the series.

== Cast ==
- Lola Tung as Isabel "Belly" Conklin
- Christopher Briney as Conrad Fisher
- Gavin Casalegno as Jeremiah Fisher

== Production ==
=== Development ===
On September 17, 2025, after the series finale, Prime Video announced that a follow-up film directed by Jenny Han, and written by herself and Sarah Kucserka was in development to conclude the series's story. Lola Tung, Christopher Briney and Gavin Casalegno were set to reprise their roles from the series. By December 2025, the script was already written.

=== Filming ===
Principal photography began on April 27, 2026 in Wilmington, North Carolina, under the working title Blue Christmas, and was set to conclude on July 1, 2026. It wrapped in late July.

In May 2026, during filming, Prime Video and Jenny Han had to issue statements asking fans to leave the cast and crew members alone after leaked photos circulated on various social media platforms.
