= Emma Chamberlain =

American media personality (born 2001)

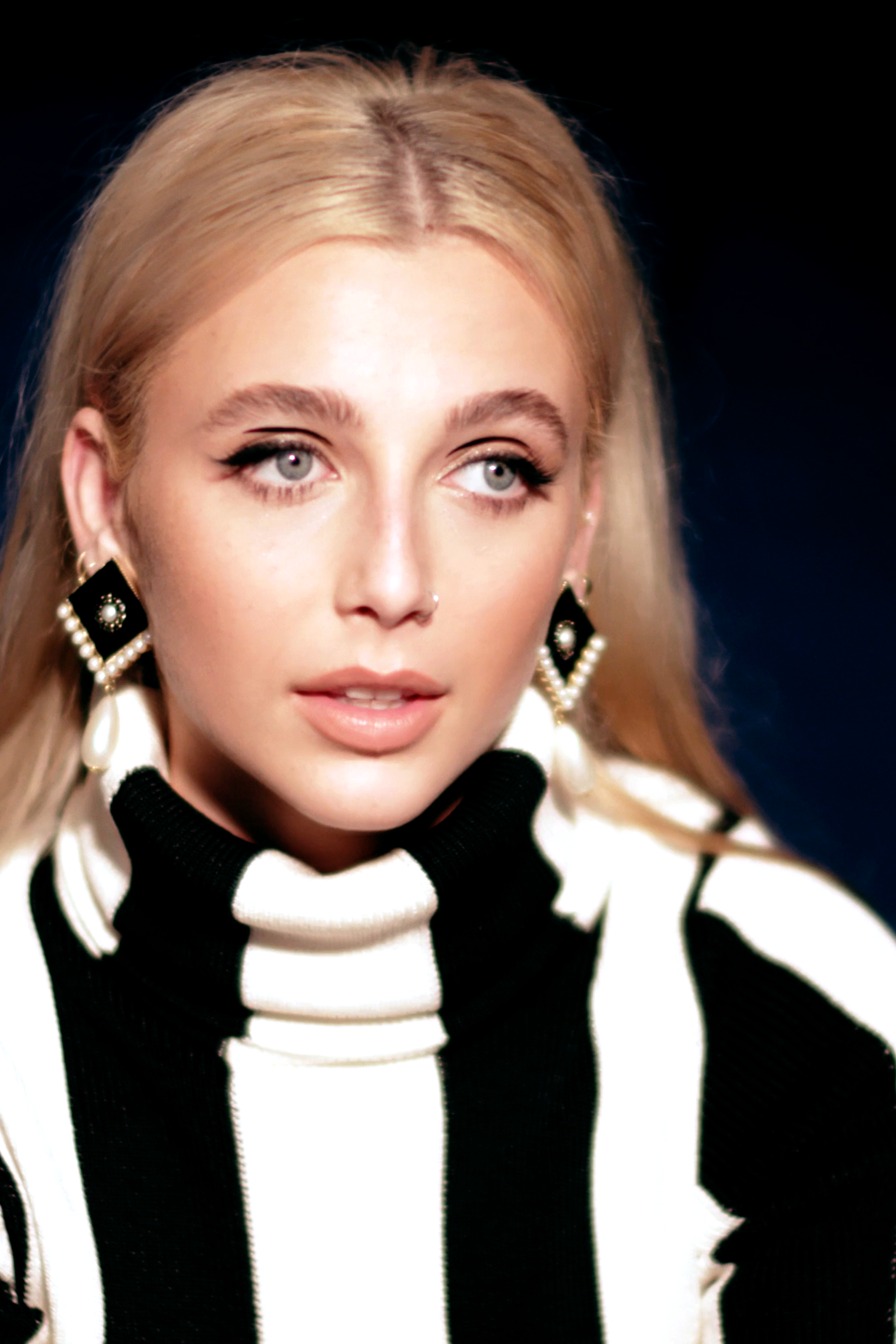
- Chamberlain in 2020
- Born: Emma Frances Chamberlain; May 22, 2001 (age 25); San Bruno, California, U.S.
- Occupations: Internet personality; YouTuber; podcaster; model; Influencer
- Years active: 2016–present
- Known for: Anything Goes; Chamberlain Coffee

YouTube information
- Channel: Emma Chamberlain
- Genre: Talk
- Subscribers: 12 million
- Views: 1.7 billion
- Last updated: November 20, 2026

Emma Frances Chamberlain (born May 22, 2001) is an American influencer, podcaster, businesswoman, and model. She won the 2018 Streamy Award for Breakout Creator. In 2019, Time magazine included her on its Time 100 Next list, and its list of The 25 Most Influential People On The Internet, writing that "Chamberlain pioneered an approach to vlogging that shook up YouTube's unofficial style guide."

In April 2019, she launched her first weekly podcast series, Anything Goes, formerly known as Stupid Genius. Chamberlain subsequently won the award for "Best Podcaster" at the 12th Shorty Awards. In December 2019, she launched her own online mail order coffee company, Chamberlain Coffee. She also has been an ambassador for Louis Vuitton since 2019 and Cartier since 2022.

== Early life ==
Chamberlain was born on May 22, 2001, in San Bruno, California. She is an only child, and her parents divorced when she was five years old.

In a 2018 interview with Forbes, Chamberlain said her family had struggled financially during her childhood. They depended on commissions from her father's art, and when he was ill and unable to paint they endured "hard times".

She attended Central Middle School in San Carlos, California, and Notre Dame High School, Belmont, an all-girl Catholic preparatory school where she was on the cheerleading and track teams. She was a competitive cheerleader for five years and competed with the California Allstars in Livermore, California, on the team Senior Pink. She left high school during the first semester of her junior year and graduated after passing the California High School Exit Exam. In 2024, Chamberlain received her high school diploma at age 23 with the class of 2024.

== Career ==
=== YouTube ===
Chamberlain became dissatisfied with high school toward the end of her sophomore year, and after speaking with her father she was encouraged to find a passion outside of school. On June 14, 2016, she launched her YouTube channel as a way to find that passion. As of December 2025, her YouTube channel had reached 12 million subscribers and accumulated a total of 1.7 billion video views. Chamberlain's content included cooking videos, fashion "hauls" (bulk purchases of typically cheap clothing items), car vlogs, collaborations with fellow YouTubers, among others. She was known for her penchant for coffee, as well as her authentic, self-deprecating humor. Chamberlain gained notoriety for her unique editing style, characterized by zooms, adding text to the screen, and pauses.

In June 2018, Chamberlain moved alone from the Bay Area to Los Angeles. There, she formed the Sister Squad with fellow teen YouTubers James Charles and comedy duo The Dolan Twins. The four were featured in YouTube Rewind 2018. The Sister Squad was nominated for a 2019 YouTube Ensemble Shorty Award.

In addition to the collaboration videos with the members of the Sister Squad, throughout 2018 Chamberlain and fellow Dote-associated female YouTubers Ellie Thumann and Hannah Meloche posted videos featuring each other on their respective channels, calling their group of three "The Girdies".

In June 2018, Tana Mongeau invited Chamberlain to be a Featured Creator at Tanacon in Anaheim, Mongeau's alternative to VidCon that took place at the same time at a nearby convention center. Chamberlain's one-on-one onstage interview with Mongeau was the last event before the convention was canceled due to overcrowding and security concerns. In July, Chamberlain was signed by United Talent Agency.

At VidCon 2019, Snapchat announced that Chamberlain would be one of several celebrities from various entertainment platforms to premiere a Creator Show later in the year. At the 2019 Teen Choice Awards, Chamberlain won the award for Choice Female Web Star. During the September New York Fashion Week, Chamberlain hosted the Teen Vogue event Generation Next attended by Vogue Editor-In-Chief Anna Wintour. At the 45th People's Choice Awards, she was nominated for the Social Star award. She collaborated with eyewear company Crap Eyewear for a line of sunglasses she helped design.

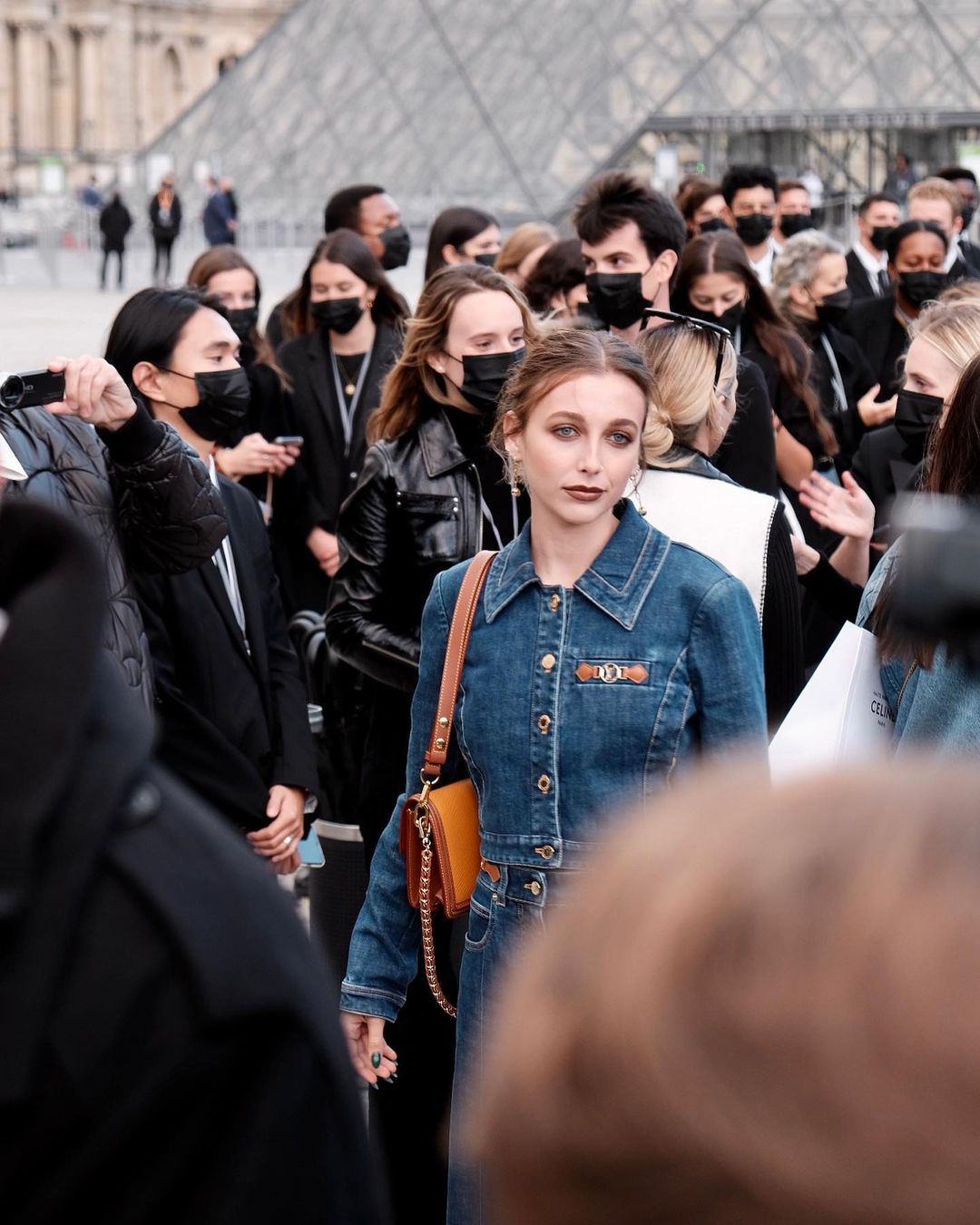
Chamberlain attends the Louis Vuitton show at Paris Fashion Week in 2021.

She attended her second Louis Vuitton-sponsored Paris Fashion Week, collaborating with Vogue for a preparation video about the process. She collaborated with Calvin Klein for a series of videos and photo shoots. At the 2019 Streamy Awards, Chamberlain was nominated for Creator of the Year, Editing, and First Person. She appeared in a series of videos on the Target YouTube channel, being paired with The Office star Angela Kinsey and Fashion Police host Brad Goreski. Her Snapchat Creator Show, Adulting With Emma Chamberlain, premiered on November 4. On November 13, Time magazine included her on its Time 100 Next list, and its list of the 25 most influential people on the internet, writing that "Chamberlain pioneered an approach to vlogging that shook up YouTube's unofficial style guide." In December 2019, she was featured in a segment broadcast on ABC News Nightline, being interviewed about her career by Olympic figure skater Adam Rippon. In November 2022, she appeared on Hot Ones with Sean Evans, getting interviewed while eating increasingly spicy (plant-based) chicken wings.

In February 2024, she returned to Hot Ones with Sean Evans.

=== Fashion and business ventures ===
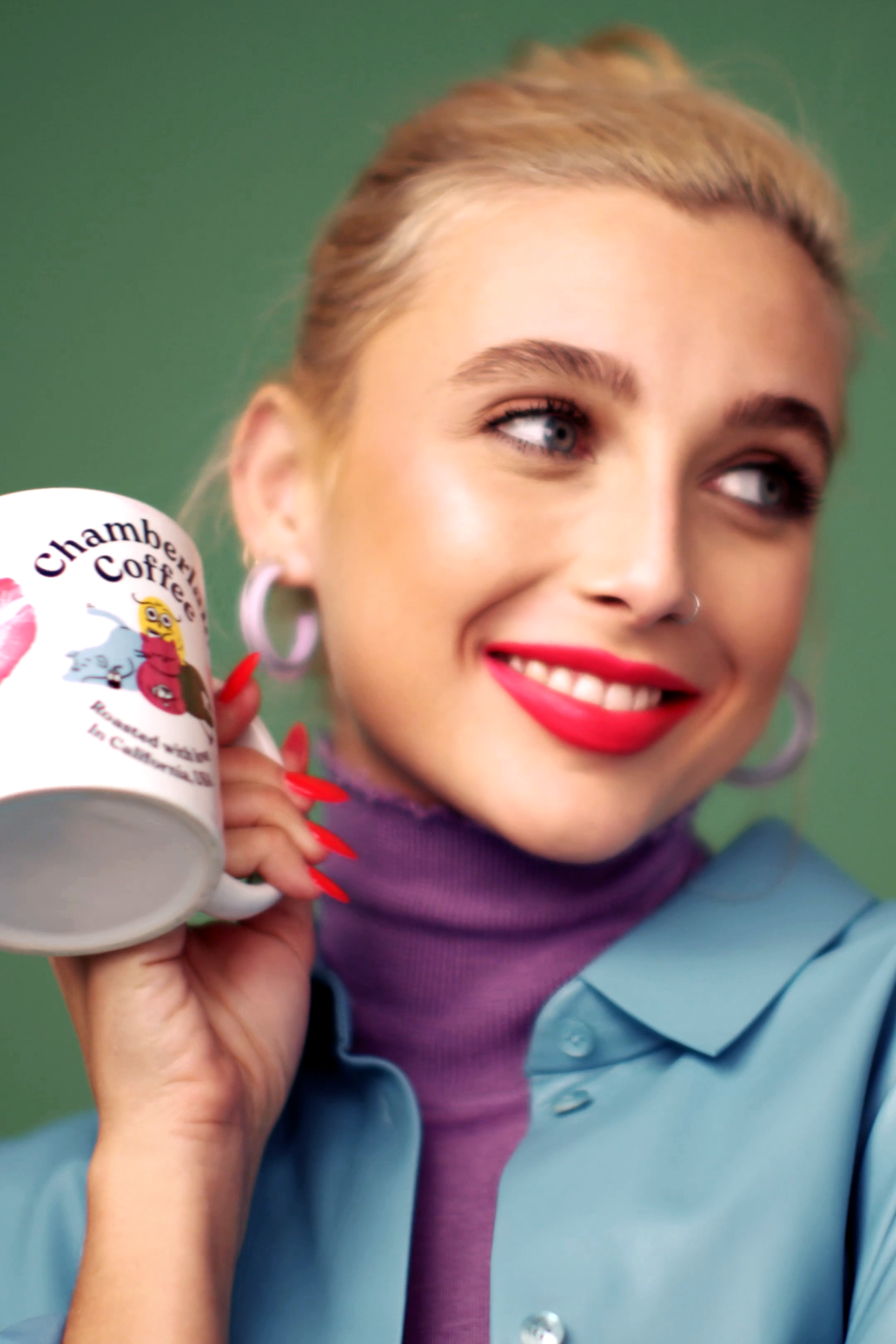
Chamberlain posing with a Chamberlain Coffee mug

In March 2018, Chamberlain became associated with the shopping app Dote. In May, 2018 Dote sent her to Austin, Texas, to the Coachella Valley Music and Arts Festival, and to Fiji with numerous other female YouTubers. In July 2018, Dote released a clothing line designed by Chamberlain, Low Key / High Key by Emma. Because of controversies related to Dote, Chamberlain cut ties with them in early 2019.

In January 2019, Chamberlain announced a collaboration with Hollister, appearing as a model for their 2019 swim collection. She attended Paris Fashion Week in March 2019 in a co-sponsorship between YouTube and Louis Vuitton, which was brokered by Derek Blasberg, the head of fashion and beauty partnerships at YouTube. She was paired with model/YouTuber Karlie Kloss at the event. On June 4, 2019, Chamberlain and The Dolan Twins uploaded videos featuring each other on their respective channels. This was their first video collaboration since the last Sister Squad videos posted in December. The absence of James Charles contributed to the belief that the Sister Squad had broken up.

In December 2019, she launched her own online mail order coffee company, Chamberlain Coffee. The company has since expanded its original menu to include items beyond coffee, such as teas, apparel, and coffee-ware. In January 2025, Chamberlain Coffee opened its first permanent physical cafe in Westfield Century City Mall in Los Angeles, followed by a second in Venice in May 2025.

Cosmopolitan featured Chamberlain on the cover of its February 2020 issue, writing the caption below her name, "The most popular girl in the world". In the interview she revealed details of dealing with body dysmorphia and struggling with eating disorders, and she posted a video about the photo shoot to her YouTube channel, My First American Magazine Cover. A few months later, she appeared on the cover of the Italian edition of Cosmopolitan, and the Dutch version, Cosmo Girl. For the 2020 Shorty Awards, she won Best Podcaster for her work on Stupid Genius. Still partnering with Ramble Official, on February 20, Chamberlain premiered her newly formatted and named podcast, Anything Goes. On March 21, Variety reported that she had purchased a house in West Hollywood. During the COVID-19 pandemic, Chamberlain was one of the creators participating in YouTube's "Stay Home #WithMe" PSA campaign. Recorded prior to the COVID-19 pandemic, on April 16 she appeared in an episode of Kevin Hart's YouTube series What The Fit, playing soccer with the LA Galaxy.

Allure featured Chamberlain on the cover of its June/July 2020 issue. During the summer of 2020, Vogue Australia and Nylon published feature articles about her. Variety included her in its 2020 "Power of Young Hollywood" list. On August 18, she published The Ideal Planner, a daily planner, via the Gallery Books division of Simon & Schuster. On August 26, her IGTV series Styled By Emma premiered on Instagram. On September 1, Chamberlain and James Charles posted videos featuring each other on their respective YouTube channels, their first collaboration since the last round of Sister Squad videos posted on December 25, 2018.

On September 13, 2021, Chamberlain attended the 2021 Met Gala. She wore Louis Vuitton to the Lexicon of Fashion in America event. She also hosted celebrity interviews for the fashion magazine Vogue, which were subsequently posted to Vogue's YouTube channel. Harper's Bazaar featured Emma Chamberlain as their March 2022 Cover Girl. She was photographed in Louis Vuitton and revealed her thoughts on self-expression in an all-inclusive interview.

In January 2023, Chamberlain became a brand ambassador for Lancome. She appeared in the four-episode web series How Do You Say Beauty in French, which launched on January 12, 2023.

=== Podcast ===
On April 11, 2019, Chamberlain launched the first episode of her podcast, Anything Goes (previously named Stupid Genius), a weekly series in which she attempts to make an ongoing conversation about any particular issue/topic. The program was produced by Ramble Official in a partnership with Cadence13 and United Talent Agency, until February 2023 when it became a Spotify exclusive. She addresses a wide range of topics such as relationships, mental health, fashion, and intuition. At the 47th People's Choice Awards, Anything Goes won the Pop Podcast award. On April 23, 2026, Chamberlain announced an "indefinite" hiatus from her weekly posting on the podcast.

=== Film and television ===
In 2023, Chamberlain was cast as the voice of a reporter in the animated teen fantasy comedy film Ruby Gillman, Teenage Kraken. In 2025, she began filming on horror film Forbidden Fruits, alongside Lili Reinhart, Lola Tung, Victoria Pedretti, and Alexandra Shipp.

== Public image ==
In an article for The Atlantic, Taylor Lorenz wrote that Chamberlain was "the most talked about influencer in the world." Time included her in its 2019 list of The 25 Most Influential People on the Internet. Writing for The New York Times in 2019, Jonah Engel Bromwich wrote that Chamberlain was "the funniest person on YouTube," and stated that she "invented the way people talk on YouTube now, particularly the way they communicate authenticity." In 2020, Forbes included Chamberlain in their "30 Under 30" list in the Social Media category. Chamberlain openly talks about anxiety, burnout, loneliness, and internet pressure.

In May 2022, Chamberlain attended the Met Gala as video host for Vogue. During the interview she spoke with many prominent celebrities, including Jack Harlow whose awkwardly flirtatious interaction went viral online. In addition, controversy arose surrounding Chamberlain's choice of jewelry. Chamberlain worked with Cartier for the event and was loaned the Patiala necklace which was created for, and later was discovered to be missing from, the collection of Maharaja Bhupinder Singh of Patiala, a part of Punjab in North India during the colonial era. Many Indian-Americans expressed their outrage online, referring to the necklace as "stolen". Neither Chamberlain nor Cartier commented.

== Personal life ==
In 2020, Chamberlain began dating musician Tucker Pillsbury, known by the stage name Role Model. In October 2023, E! News reported the couple had split after three years of dating. Chamberlain resides in Beverly Hills, California.

Chamberlain practices drumming as a hobby, and she can be seen playing the drums in numerous videos. Chamberlain has many other hobbies, including painting, sewing, reading, and playing guitar.

== Filmography ==
=== Film ===
Year	Title	Role	Note
2022	The Paloni Show! Halloween Special!	Megg	Voice role
2023	Ruby Gillman, Teenage Kraken	Reporter	Voice role
2026	Forbidden Fruits	Pickle	

=== Television ===
Year	Title	Role	Note
2019	Double Dare	Herself / Contestant	2 episodes
2023	Dave	Herself	Episode: "Met Gala"
2025	YOLO	Sofia	Episode: "SOMEONE COME BRING ME FOOD AND ENTERTAIN ME!"

=== Music video ===
Year	Title	Artist(s)
2024	"360"	Charli XCX

=== Web ===
Year	Title	Role	Note
2018	YouTube Rewind 2018: Everyone Controls Rewind	Herself	
2019–present	Anything Goes with Emma Chamberlain	Herself / Host	Podcast
2019	Adulting with Emma Chamberlain	Herself / Host	Snapchat reality series
2022	Architectural Digest	Herself / Guest	Episode; "Inside Emma Chamberlain's Radiant New Home"
2022	Hot Ones	Herself / Guest	Episode; "Emma Chamberlain Has a Spiritual Awakening While Eating Spicy Wings"
2024	Hot Ones	Herself / Guest	Episode; "Emma Chamberlain Goes for the Glory While Eating Spicy Wings"
2026	Architectural Digest	Herself / Guest	Episode; "Every Way Emma Chamberlain Has Updated Her Home"

== Awards and nominations ==
Year	Award	Category	Nominee(s)	Result	Ref(s).
2018	Streamy Awards	Breakout Creator	Herself	Won	
2018	Streamy Awards	First Person	Herself	Nominated	
2018	Streamy Awards	Creator of the Year	Herself	Nominated	
2018	Shorty Awards	Breakout YouTuber of the Year	Herself	Nominated	
2019	Shorty Awards	YouTuber of the Year	Herself	Nominated	
2019	Teen Choice Awards	Choice Female Web Star	Herself	Won	
2020	Shorty Awards	Best Podcaster	Herself	Won	
2020	Streamy Awards	Creator of the Year	Herself	Nominated	
2020	Streamy Awards	First Person	Herself	Won	
2020	Streamy Awards	Podcast	Anything Goes with Emma Chamberlain	Nominated	
2020	Streamy Awards	Editing	Herself	Nominated	
2020	Streamy Awards	Creator Product	Chamberlain Coffee	Won	
2020	People's Choice Awards	Social Star of 2020	Herself	Won	
2020	People's Choice Awards	Pop Podcast of 2020	Anything Goes with Emma Chamberlain	Won	
2021	Streamy Awards	Creator of the Year	Herself	Nominated	
2022	Kids' Choice Awards	Favorite Female Creator	Herself	Nominated	

== See also ==
- List of YouTubers
