= Jackie Chung =

American actress (born 1979)

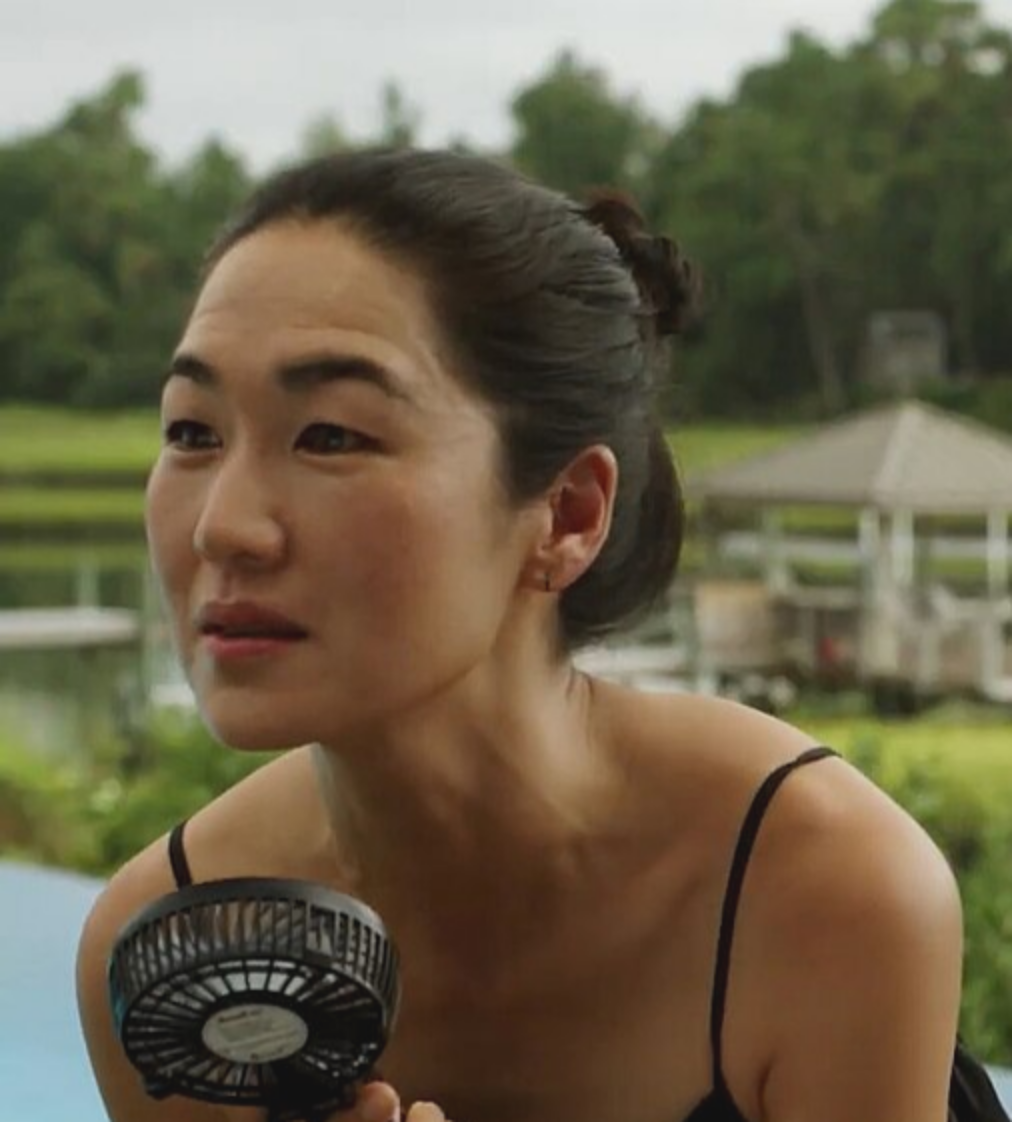
- Chung filming season 1 of The Summer I Turned Pretty
- Born: July 10, 1979 (age 47)
- Education: Stanford University
- Occupation: Actress
- Years active: 2005–present
- Known for: The Summer I Turned Pretty
- Spouse: Louis Ozawa
- Children: 2

Jackie Chung (born July 10, 1979) is an American actress known for her role as Laurel Park on the 2022 Amazon series The Summer I Turned Pretty. Her television appearances include Station 19 and Grey's Anatomy.

== Education ==
Chung graduated with a bachelor of fine arts from Stanford University.

== Career ==
Chung began her career in theatre.

she made her on-screen acting debut portraying JC in the 2005 short film Take It or Leave It?.

In 2006, she guest starred on an episode of Finding My America.

In 2015, Chung starred as Kat/Yoo Jin in Someone Else, a drama thriller short film about two Korean American cousins. She also portrayed Kamiko Nakamura on a 2015 episode of the Hulu series Deadbeat.

In 2017, Chung made an appearance as Cleo Kim on Grey's Anatomy.

In 2022, Chung began starring as Laurel Park, mother of Isabel "Belly" Conklin (Lola Tung), the lead character of the show The Summer I Turned Pretty. The series aired for three seasons until 2025.

== Personal life ==
Chung is married to American actor Louis Ozawa Changchien. They have two children.

== Filmography ==
=== Film ===
Year	Title	Role	Notes
2005	Take It or Leave It?	JC	Acting Debut
2000	Hiding Divya	Police Officer #1	
2008	The Ninja Always Rings Once	Kei	Short Film
2011	Green Plastic Sandals	Lisa	Short Film
2015	Someone Else	Kat/Yoo Jin	Short Film
2019	Coming Home Again	Mom	
2021	The Complaint	Professor	Short Film

=== Television ===
Year	Title	Role	Notes
2006	Finding My America	Amy	Guest Star
2013	Fortune Sun	Alice Yu	
2015	Deadbeat	Kamiko Nakamura	1 Episode
2017	Grey's Anatomy	Cleo Kim	Season 14, Episode 7: "Who Lives, Who Dies, Who Tells Your Story"
2019	Station 19	Margaret Chen	Season 2, Episode 9: "I Fought the Law"
2022–2025	The Summer I Turned Pretty	Laurel Park	Main Role; 3 seasons: 23 Episodes
