= Lola Tung =

American actress (born 2002)

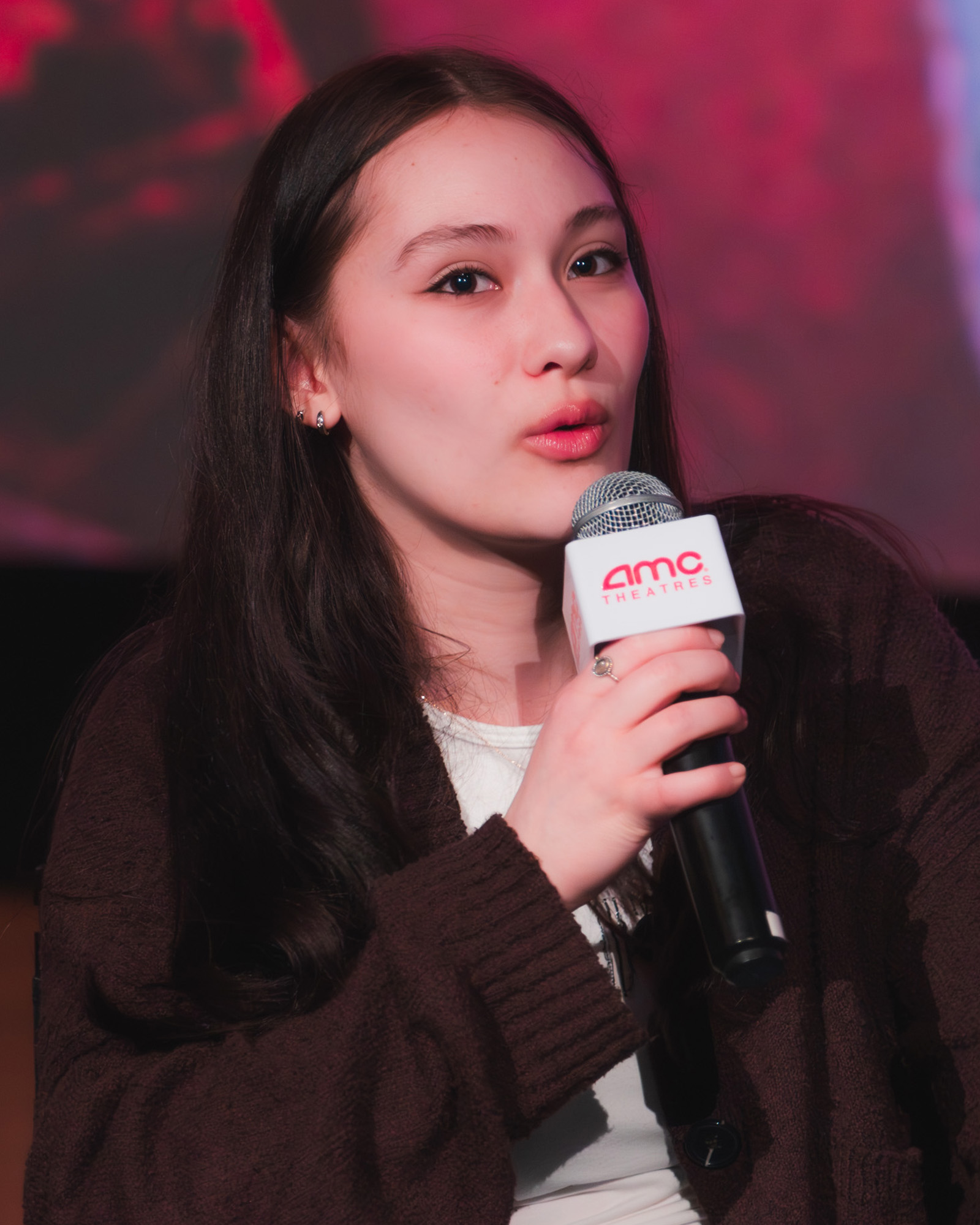
- Tung in 2026
- Born: Lola Marie Tung; October 28, 2002 (age 24); New York City, U.S.
- Education: Carnegie Mellon University
- Occupations: Actress; singer
- Years active: 2021–present

Lola Marie Tung (born October 28, 2002) is an American actress and singer. She is known for playing Isabel "Belly" Conklin in the Amazon Prime Video series The Summer I Turned Pretty, which is based on the namesake novel by Jenny Han. She made her Broadway debut as Eurydice in the Tony Awards-winning musical Hadestown in 2024.

== Early life and education ==
Tung was born and raised in New York City. Her mother is of Chinese and Swedish descent and her father is of Eastern European descent. Her maternal grandmother is from Sweden.

During middle school, she participated in productions of Little Shop of Horrors and The Wizard of Oz. She attended the public Fiorello H. LaGuardia High School of Music and Art and Performing Arts, from which she graduated in 2020. While in high school, she participated in a production of Rent with her extracurricular theater group.

In the fall of 2020, she began studying at the School of Drama of Carnegie Mellon University in Pittsburgh, Pennsylvania. In 2021, after completing her freshman year of undergraduate studies, she left college to film the first season of The Summer I Turned Pretty.

== Career ==
During her senior year of high school, amid the COVID-19 pandemic, Tung performed in LaGuardia High School's virtual senior acting showcase, where her current manager saw her first perform. During her first year at Carnegie Mellon University in early 2021, she auditioned for the main role of Isabel "Belly" Conklin in The Summer I Turned Pretty, the Amazon Prime Video's television adaptation of Jenny Han's bestselling trilogy. She was announced as the lead role on April 28, 2021, and signed with Creative Artists Agency in September 2021.

Before the first season's release, Amazon Prime Video renewed The Summer I Turned Pretty for a second season, which was filmed in the summer of 2022. In August 2023, the series was renewed for a third season, however, production was delayed due to the 2023 SAG-AFTRA strike. In November 2023, Tung worked with Cameron Crowe and Tom Kitt as Penny Lane in their developmental residency of Almost Famous at the Eugene O'Neill Theater Center.

In February 2024, Tung made her Broadway debut as Eurydice in the Tony Award-winning musical, Hadestown; she replaced Solea Pfeiffer for a limited run, starring opposite Jordan Fisher as Orpheus. For the role, Tung earned her first ever award nomination at the 2024 Broadway.com Audience Choice Awards. She also received a nomination for Favorite Broadway Debut at the 2025 iHeartRadio Music Awards.

In March 2025, Tung was cast in the witch horror film Forbidden Fruits, which was released in 2026. On May 2, 2025, she performed in Tom Kitt's Tom Kitt & Friends concert at 54 Below in New York City. Later that year, she was cast in both the romantic comedy Chasing Summer directed by Josephine Decker, and horror thriller The Young People directed by Oz Perkins. The final season of The Summer I Turned Pretty aired from July to September 2025. However, it was later announced that Amazon Prime Video had greenlit a feature film adaptation of the series.

In March 2026, Tung was honored as the Emerging Shiftmaker at the Shiftmakers Gala at Harvard Art Museums, held in recognition of Women's History Month, for her work in film and television and her impact on representation. In July 2026, Tung joined the cast of the A24 film Please, directed by Halina Reijn.

== Fashion ==
In April 2023, Tung became the face of Coachtopia, a line of Coach New York products made with sustainable manufacturing techniques. Later that year, she was featured in a campaign for American Eagle Outfitters, along with her The Summer I Turned Pretty co-stars, Christopher Briney and Gavin Casalegno. She also starred in Coachtopia's 2023 winter holiday campaign, which aimed to spread awareness about waste produced during the holiday season.

In July 2026, Tung was named a Coach global ambassador for eyewear, watches, and fragrance.

== Acting credits ==
Key
†	Denotes films that have not yet been released

=== Film ===
Year	Title	Role	Notes	Ref.
2026	Chasing Summer	Harper		
2026	Forbidden Fruits	Pumpkin		
TBA	The Young People †	TBA	Post-production	
TBA	Untitled The Summer I Turned Pretty film †	Isabel "Belly" Conklin	Post-production	
TBA	Please †	TBA	Pre-production	

=== Television ===
Year	Title	Role	Notes	Ref.
2022–2025	The Summer I Turned Pretty	Isabel "Belly" Conklin	Main role	

=== Theater ===
Year	Title	Role	Venue	Notes	Ref.
2023	Set Me Free	Trina	The Town Hall	The 24 Hour Plays	
2023	Almost Famous	Penny Lane	Eugene O'Neill Theater Center	Workshop readings	
2024	Hadestown	Eurydice (replacement)	Walter Kerr Theatre	Broadway	
2025	The Turning	Nora	Center Theatre Group	Workshop presentations	

=== Audiobooks ===
Year	Title	Voice role	Notes	Ref.
2022	The Summer I Turned Pretty	Isabel "Belly" Conklin	Re-recorded audiobooks	
2022	It's Not Summer Without You	Isabel "Belly" Conklin	Re-recorded audiobooks	
2022	We'll Always Have Summer	Isabel "Belly" Conklin	Re-recorded audiobooks	

=== Music videos ===
Year	Title	Artist	Ref.
2025	"Who's Your Boyfriend"	Royel Otis	
2026	"Madwoman"	Laufey	
2026	"Gave Me A Sign"	Summer Fling	

== Awards and nominations ==
Award	Year	Category	Nominated work	Result	Ref.
Broadway.com Audience Choice Awards	2024	Favorite Replacement (Female)	Hadestown	Nominated	
IHeartRadio Music Awards	2025	Favorite Broadway Debut	Hadestown	Nominated	
Shiftmakers Gala at Harvard Art Museums	2026	Emerging Shiftmaker	—	Honored	
