= Christopher Briney =

American actor (born 1998)

- Briney in 2026
- Born: Christopher Thomas Briney; March 24, 1998 (age 28); Danbury, Connecticut, U.S.
- Education: Pace University (BFA)
- Occupation: Actor
- Years active: 2022–present

Christopher Thomas Briney (born March 24, 1998) is an American actor. He is known for his breakthrough role as Conrad Fisher in the Amazon Prime Video teen romance series The Summer I Turned Pretty (2022–2025). He also starred in the musical film Mean Girls (2024).

== Early life ==
Briney was born in Danbury, Connecticut, the son of actors who met in New York City. He has one sister. He attended Waterbury Arts Magnet School and participated in a five-week intensive theater program at Wesleyan University in 2015. In 2016, he moved to New York City to attend Pace University. He graduated with a BFA in acting in 2020. While a student, he worked at Trader Joe's.

== Career ==
In 2021, Briney was cast in the film Dalíland after being discovered by director Mary Harron. He later made his television debut in the Amazon Prime Video teen romance television series The Summer I Turned Pretty, based on the book series of the same name by Jenny Han. Han stated that choosing Briney to play Conrad was the easiest casting choice for the series.

In 2024, he portrayed Aaron Samuels in the teen musical comedy film Mean Girls. He made his off-Broadway debut in 2025 in the play Dilaria, written by Julia Randall.

== Personal life ==
Briney has been in a relationship with Isabel Machado since 2021. The two met as fellow acting students at Pace University.

== Acting credits ==
Key
†	Denotes films that have not yet been released

=== Film ===
Year	Title	Role	Notes	Ref.
2022	Dalíland	James Linton		
2024	Mean Girls	Aaron Samuels		
2026	The Julia Set	Pascal		
2026	Clashing Through the Snow †	Ryan	Post-production	
TBA	Untitled The Summer I Turned Pretty film †	Conrad Fisher	Post-production	

=== Television ===
Year	Title	Role	Notes	Ref.
2022–2025	The Summer I Turned Pretty	Conrad Fisher	Main role; 26 episodes	
2026	Hacks	Nico Hayes	2 episodes	

=== Theater ===
Year	Title	Role	Venue	Notes	Ref.
2025	Dilaria	Noah	DR2 Theatre	Off-Broadway	

=== Audiobooks ===
Year	Title	Voice role	Notes	Ref.
2022	We'll Always Have Summer	Conrad Fisher	Re-recorded audiobook	
2023	Influencer	Aaron Fortin	Audible original	
2025	Hidden Harbor	River	Quinn original	

== Awards and nominations ==
Award	Year	Category	Nominated work	Result	Ref.
North Fork TV Festival	2025	Rising Star Award	The Summer I Turned Pretty	Won	
