= Chasing Summer (film) =

2026 American comedy-drama film

- Directed by: Josephine Decker
- Written by: Iliza Shlesinger
- Produced by: Ray Maiello; Rob Guillermo; Nihaar Sinha; Houston King
- Starring: Iliza Shlesinger; Tom Welling; Lola Tung; Garrett Wareing; Cassidy Freeman; Megan Mullally
- Cinematography: Eric Branco
- Edited by: David Barker
- Music by: Tamar-kali
- Production companies: Radiant Media Studios; Indus Valley Media; Pressman Film
- Distributed by: Magenta Light Studios
- Release dates: January 26, 2026 (Sundance); April 16, 2027 (United States)
- Running time: 98 minutes
- Country: United States
- Language: English

Chasing Summer is a 2026 American comedy-drama film directed by Josephine Decker, from a screenplay by Iliza Shlesinger. It stars Shlesinger, Tom Welling, Lola Tung, Garrett Wareing, Cassidy Freeman and Megan Mullally.

It had its world premiere at the 2026 Sundance Film Festival on January 26, 2026. The film is also set to be released in theaters April 16, 2027.

== Premise ==
After losing both her job and boyfriend, Jamie retreats to her small Texas hometown where friends and flings from a fateful high school summer turn her life upside down.

== Cast ==
- Iliza Shlesinger as Jamie
- Garrett Wareing as Colby
- Lola Tung as Harper
- Cassidy Freeman as Marissa
- Tom Welling as Chase
- Megan Mullally as Layanne
- Aimee Garcia as Amanda
- Jeff Perry as Randall
- David Castañeda as Aaron
- Lauren Aboulafia as Lexi
- Kristin Slaysman as Morgan

== Production ==
In October 2025, it was announced Iliza Shlesinger, Garrett Wareing, Lola Tung, Cassidy Freeman, Tom Welling, Megan Mullally, Jeff Perry and Aimee Garcia had joined the cast of the film, with Josephine Decker directing from a screenplay by Shlesinger who will also serve as a producer.

Principal photography took place in August 2025, in St. Louis.

== Release ==
Chasing Summer had its world premiere at the 2026 Sundance Film Festival on January 26, 2026. Magenta Light Studios acquired the U.S. and Canadian theatrical rights and is set to be released on April 16, 2027.

During the episode of his Talk Ville Podcast uploaded on October 7, 2026, Tom Welling stated "apparently by the time this airs, I think the movie is going to be actually out". Talk Ville Podcast Producer, and Third Chair, Ryan Tellez replied by saying "October".
