= Louis Ozawa Changchien =

American actor (born 1975)

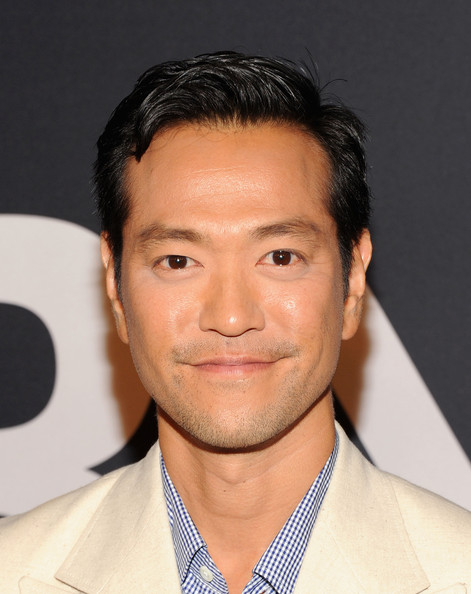
- Louis Ozawa Changchien at the premiere of The Bourne Legacy
- Born: October 11, 1975 (age 50); New York City, U.S.
- Other names: Louiz Ozawa; Louis Changchien
- Education: University of California, Davis (BS); Brown University (MFA)
- Years active: 1999–present
- Spouse: Jackie Chung
- Children: 2

Louis Ozawa Changchien (born October 11, 1975) is an American actor best known for his role in the films The Bourne Legacy (2012) and Jack Ryan (2023), and for his role as members of the Kawakami family in the Predator and Alien vs. Predator franchises, including Hanzo Kawakami in Predators (2010), Eiji Kawakami in Aliens vs. Predators: Ultimate Prey (2022), and Kenji and Kiyoshi Kawakami in Predator: Killer of Killers (2025).

== Early life and education ==
Changchien was born in Queens, New York, and was raised in New York City and Japan. His father was Taiwanese and his mother was a Japanese jewellery designer. He attended Riverdale Country School as well as Stuyvesant High School before graduating from the University of California, Davis, with a bachelor's degree in biology and later earned a Master of Fine Arts (M.F.A.) in acting from Brown University.

== Career ==
Changchien first appeared in the 1999 film On the Q.T. as Kenneth. Since then, he has appeared in many popular films, including Robot Stories, Fair Game, Predators and The Bourne Legacy. He also has made guest appearances on such shows as Law & Order, 3 lbs, Heroes and Villains, Lights Out and Blue Bloods.

== Filmography ==
=== Film ===
Year	Title	Role	Notes
1999	On the Q.T.	Kenneth	Film Debut
2003	Robot Stories	Wilson	
2008	Gigantic	Matsubara	
2008	Pretty to Think So	Jiwon Kwon	
2008	Tomorrow Arigato	Hiro	
2010	Fair Game	Nervous Analyst #1	
2010	Predators	Hanzo Kawakami	
2010	Predators: Moments of Extraction	Hanzo Kawakami (voice)	Animated short film
2011	Lefty Loosey Righty Tighty	Michael	
2012	The Bourne Legacy	LARX #3	
2012	Things I Don't Understand	Tao	
2013	America Falls	Toru Suzuki	Short film
2014	The Sisterhood of Night	Stanley Huang	
2015	Someone Else	Harry	
2016	Spectral	Sergeant Chen	
2017	The Ningyo	Hatori Bikuni	Short film
2018	Continuum	Larry Hu	Short film
2021	Lavrynthos	Minotaur (voice)	Short film
2025	Predator: Killer of Killers	Kenji and Kiyoshi Kawakami (voice)	

=== Television ===
Year	Title	Role	Notes
2006	Law & Order	Fugitive Team Director Nguyen	Episode: "Deadlock"
2006	3 lbs	ICU Nurse	Episode: "Dissarming"
2008	Heroes and Villains	Hideaki Kobayakawa	Episode: "Shogun"
2011	Lights Out	Event Staffer	Episode: "Pilot", Credited as Louis Changchien
2011	The Miraculous Year	Tamil Lee	Television Film
2012	Blue Bloods	Abdul Sayid	Episode: "Risk and Reward"
2013	Agents of S.H.I.E.L.D.	Chan Ho Yin / Scorch	Episode: "Girl in the Flower Dress"
2013	Hawaii Five-0	Sato	Episode: "Akanahe"
2014	Matador	Samuel	Recurring role, 12 episodes
2014	True Blood	Hiroki	2 episodes
2015	Deadbeat	Dr. Wong	Episode: "Finger F... Ked"
2015–2016	The Man in the High Castle	Paul Kasoura	5 episodes
2016	The Mysteries of Laura	Jimmy Chun	2 episodes
2017	MacGyver	Dev Singh	Episode: "CD-ROM + Hoagie Foil"
2018	Bosch	Chuck Deng	6 episodes
2018	Kidding	Mr. Pickles-San	3 episodes
2018	Magnum P.I.	Alan Sako	Episode: "The Ties That Bind"
2018	Elementary	Go Shinura	Episode: "Give Me the Finger"
2019	Supergirl	Hat	2 episodes
2019	The Good Fight	Oshito	Episode: "The One Inspired by Ray Cohn"
2019	Blindspot	Ken Lee	Episode: "The Tale of the Book of Secrets"
2019–2020	Mickey and the Roadster Racers	Additional Voices	2 episodes
2020	Grey's Anatomy	Steve Lee	2 episodes
2020–2023	Hunters	Joe Mizushima	18 episodes
2022–2024	Pachinko	Mamoru Yoshii	7 episodes
2023	Jack Ryan	Chao Fah	6 episodes
2024	Gremlins: Secrets of the Mogwai	Fan Fan (voice)	Episode: "There's Always a Fortune in the Cookie Factory"

=== Voice work ===
Year	Title	Role	Notes	Ref.
2022	Aliens vs. Predators: Ultimate Prey	Eiji Kawakami	Segment: "Kyodai"	

=== Video games ===
Year	Title	Role	Notes
2008	Midnight Club: Los Angeles	Andrew	Credited as Louis Changchien
2009	Grand Theft Auto IV: The Lost and Damned	The New Crowd of Liberty City	Credited as Louis Changchien

== Bibliography ==
- Maberry, Jonathan and Ozawa, Louis (2022). Aliens vs. Predators: Ultimate Prey. Titan Books.

== See also ==
- List of Japanese Americans
- List of Taiwanese Americans
