= The Young People =

Upcoming horror film by Osgood Perkins

- Directed by: Osgood Perkins
- Written by: Osgood Perkins
- Produced by: Chris Ferguson; Osgood Perkins; Brian Kavanaugh-Jones
- Starring: Lola Tung; Nico Parker; Brendan Hines; Tatiana Maslany; Johnny Knoxville; Heather Graham; Nicole Kidman
- Production companies: Lyrical Media; Phobos; Range
- Distributed by: Neon
- Country: United States
- Language: English

The Young People is an upcoming American horror film written and directed by Osgood Perkins. It stars Lola Tung, Nico Parker, Brendan Hines, Tatiana Maslany, Johnny Knoxville, Heather Graham, and Nicole Kidman.

The Young People is scheduled to be released in the United States by Neon.

== Cast ==
- Lola Tung
- Nico Parker
- Brendan Hines
- Tatiana Maslany
- Johnny Knoxville
- Heather Graham
- Nicole Kidman
- Cush Jumbo
- Lily Collias
- Lexi Minetree

== Production ==
=== Development ===
In August 2025, Osgood Perkins announced The Young People under his first-look deal with Neon. Perkins would write and direct the film based on his idea as will as also produce under his banner Phobos with his parnet Chris Ferguson while Brian Kavanaugh-Jones will also produce alongside Perkins and Ferguson under his banner Range. Lyrical Media will co-produce with Neon.

=== Casting ===
Following the annoucment, Lola Tung and Nico Parker will be starring in the film as the main leads. Brendan Hines, Tatiana Maslany, Johnny Knoxville, and Heather Graham joined the cast in late October. Nicole Kidman joined the cast in November.

=== Filming ===
Principal photography began on October 20, 2025 in Vancouver, and wrapped on December 12.

== Release ==
As of its production start date in October 2025, The Young People was reportedly scheduled to be released in 2026. As of October 2026, no release date has been set.
