= Gavin Casalegno =

American actor (born 1999)

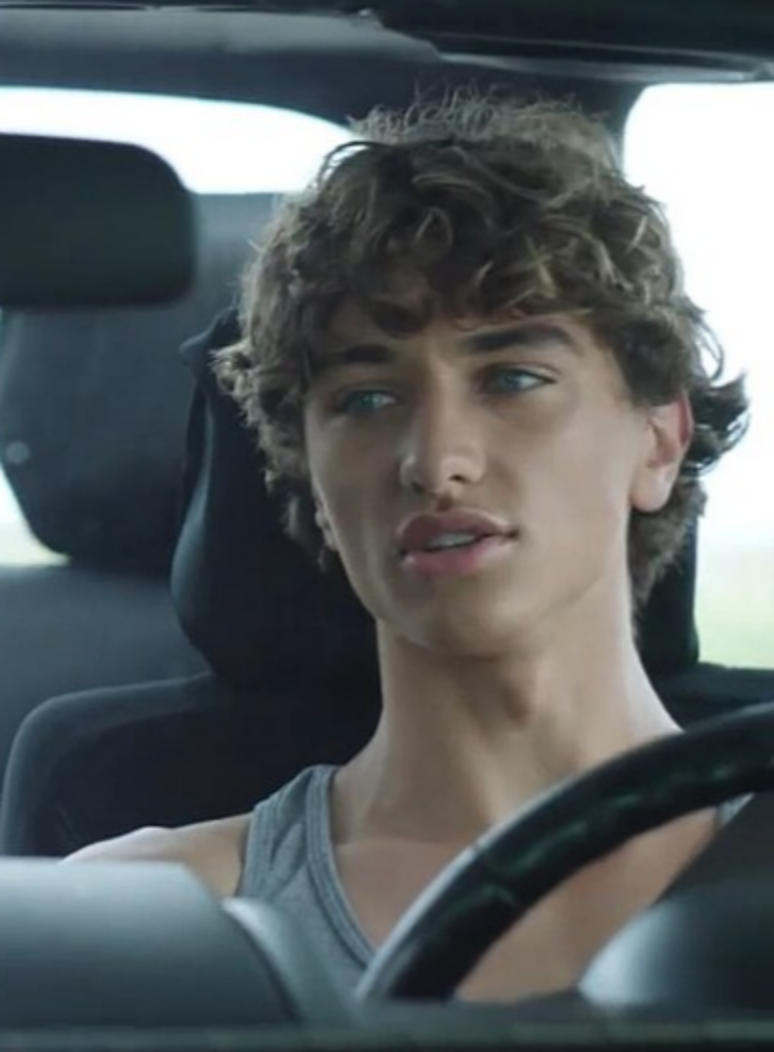
- Casalegno in 2021
- Born: September 2, 1999 (age 27); Dallas, Texas, U.S.
- Occupation: Actor
- Years active: 2010–present
- Spouse: Cheyanne King (m. 2024)

Gavin Perry Casalegno (born September 2, 1999) is an American actor. He is known for playing Jeremiah Fisher in the television series The Summer I Turned Pretty.

== Early life ==
Gavin Casalegno was born in Dallas, Texas. He is the oldest of three children. He has Italian ancestry from Piedmont, Northern Italy. He has one younger brother and a younger sister, Ashlyn Casalegno, who also is an actress and model.

Casalegno attended Lovejoy High School in Lucas, Texas.

== Career ==
Casalegno's mother's friend suggested he try modeling, which prompted his mother to look into agencies. At the age of four, he booked his first modeling job for JCPenney. He made numerous appearances in commercials such as Sony and Papa John's in the mid-2000s. Because he was a minor, his mother, Allyson Casalegno, was his manager while he traveled for work and auditions.

Casalegno relocated to Los Angeles for bigger opportunities and booked his first film project by the age of eleven. He then took on various roles, namely, young Shem in Noah in 2014, young Damon Salvatore in the CW television series, The Vampire Diaries in 2015, and Trevor Strand in the first season of Walker in 2021.

In July 2021, Deadline reported that Casalegno would play Jeremiah Fisher as one of the main characters in the Amazon Prime television series based on Jenny Han's coming-of-age novel, The Summer I Turned Pretty, which premiered on June 17, 2022. Amazon renewed season 2 of the series before its first season premiered without a release date. The second season of The Summer I Turned Pretty premiered on July 14, 2023. According to Amazon, season two was "one of the 10 most watched seasons of any series ever on the [Amazon Prime streaming] service," and they renewed it for a third season in August 2023, with ten planned episodes, even before the second season had fully aired.

On June 13, 2023, Variety announced that Casalegno was cast to play a role in a biographical film of the WWE Hall of Fame-inducted wrestler Mildred Burke in Queen of the Ring. He portrayed the younger version of Burke's son, Joe.

In 2026, he starred in the shark survival film, The Devil's Mouth, on Amazon Prime Video.

== Personal life ==
Casalegno married Cheyanne King in late 2024. He previously dated American dancer, model, and actress Larsen Thompson from 2016 to 2022.

Casalegno is a mental health advocate. He is Christian and he grew up attending church. In the summer of 2025, he and his wife moved to Thailand for a short time to work on a new project.

== Acting credits ==
Key
†	Denotes films that have not yet been released

=== Film ===
Year	Title	Role	Notes	Ref(s)
2011	Hear Me Whisper	Mason	Direct-to-video film	
2012	I Am Gabriel	Gabriel	Direct-to-video film	
2012	The Iceman	Roller skater	Uncredited	
2012	Butter	Art class student	Uncredited	
2014	Noah	Young Shem		
2014	When the Game Stands Tall	Michael Ladouceur		
2014	Dead Still	Bobby		
2016	It's Now or Never	Adidas Laufer		
2016	A Taylor Story	Michael	Direct-to-video film	
2017	Nine Seconds	Cole Jackson		
2017	Sage Alexander Hall of Nightmares: VR Experience	Sage Alexander		
2017	Urban Vibes	Himself	Direct-to-video film	
2020	The Unhealer	Reed Whitcomb		
2025	Queen of the Ring	Joe Jr.		
2026	The Devil's Mouth	Greg		
TBA	Untitled The Summer I Turned Pretty film †	Jeremiah Fisher	Filming	
TBA	Chasing Red	Caleb		
TBA	Sunflower Child	Noah		

=== Television ===
Year	Title	Role	Notes	Ref(s)
2010	Chase	School kid	Episode: Pilot	
2010	Lone Star	Thatcher wedding guest	Episode 1.2: "One in Every Family"	
2015	The Vampire Diaries	Young Damon Salvatore	Season 7; episode 7: "Mommie Dearest"	
2021	Walker	Trevor Strand	Recurring role; 8 episodes	
2022–2025	The Summer I Turned Pretty	Jeremiah Fisher	Main role	

=== Audiobooks ===
Year	Title	Role	Notes	Ref(s)
2022	It's Not Summer Without You	Jeremiah Fisher	Re-recorded audiobook	
2026	The Summer Oath	King	Recorded audiobook	
