= Sugar (2024 TV series) =

American mystery drama television series

- Genre: Drama; Detective; Mystery; Science fiction; Tech noir
- Created by: Mark Protosevich
- Showrunners: Mark Protosevich; Simon Kinberg; Sam Catlin
- Starring: Colin Farrell; Kirby; Amy Ryan; Dennis Boutsikaris; Nate Corddry; Alex Hernandez; James Cromwell; Jin Ha; Tony Dalton; Raymond Lee; Sasha Calle; Laura Donnelly; Shea Whigham
- Opening theme: "Street Fighter Mas" by Kamasi Washington
- Composers: Ali Shaheed Muhammad; Adrian Younge
- Country of origin: United States
- Original language: English
- No. of seasons: 2
- No. of episodes: 16

Production
- Executive producers: Chip Vucelich; Sam Catlin; Scott Greenberg; Fernando Meirelles; Colin Farrell; Audrey Chon; Simon Kinberg; Mark Protosevich; Michael Morris; Christopher C. Rogers; Gary Tieche
- Producers: Matt Woodall; Ryan DeGard; Sheila Phillips
- Running time: 32–49 minutes
- Production companies: Protokino; Kinberg Genre; Chapel Place Productions; Apple Studios; Short Drive Entertainment

Original release
- Network: Apple TV+
- Release: April 5 – May 17, 2024
- Network: Apple TV
- Release: June 19, 2026 – present

Sugar is an American neo-noir mystery drama television series created by Mark Protosevich for Apple TV+. The series premiered on April 5, 2024, with Fernando Meirelles directing five episodes while Adam Arkin directed three. The series stars Colin Farrell in the lead role, who also serves as an executive producer.

The first season received positive reviews and was nominated for the Primetime Emmy Award for Outstanding Cinematography for a Single-Camera Series (Half-Hour) at the 2024 Primetime Creative Arts Emmy Awards. In October 2024, the series was renewed for a second season, which premiered on June 19, 2026.

== Premise ==
Described as "a genre-bending contemporary take on the private detective story set in Los Angeles", the first season follows John Sugar, a private investigator recruited by a wealthy movie producer to investigate the disappearance of his granddaughter. In the second season, Sugar is hired to find the missing brother of a young boxing prodigy.

== Cast and characters ==
=== Main ===
- Colin Farrell as John Sugar

Season 1

- Kirby (Note: Kirby Howell-Baptiste is credited mononymously as "Kirby", after dropping her surname in 2023.) as Ruby (guest season 2)
- Amy Ryan as Melanie Matthews
- Dennis Boutsikaris as Bernie Siegel
- Nate Corddry as David Siegel
- Alex Hernandez as Kenny
- James Cromwell as Jonathan Siegel (guest season 2)

Season 2

- Jin Ha as Danny Moon
- Tony Dalton as Ray Vega
- Raymond Lee as Ji-Seok Moon
- Sasha Calle as Val
- Laura Donnelly as Charlotte Fischer
- Shea Whigham as Tom Flybjerg

=== Recurring ===
Season 1

- Miguel Sandoval as Thomas Kinsey
- Sydney Chandler as Olivia Siegel
- Eric Lange as Byron Stallings
- Elizabeth Anweis as Wendy Siegel
- Don DiPetta as Carlo Dibenidetto
- Anna Gunn as Margit Sorensen
- Jason Butler Harner as Henry Thorpe (guest season 2)
- Joey Pollari as Moss

Season 2

- Jack Topalian as Teddy Garnikian
- Akrosia Samson as Elinor
- Bernard White as Dr. Stanley Ondaajte
- Laura San Giacomo as Peg Rosenthal
- Rek Lee as Tyler Ko

=== Guest ===
- Maeve Whalen (season 1) and Mireille Enos (season 2) as Djen

Season 1

- Jon Beavers as Carl
- Natalie Alyn Lind as Rachel Kaye
- Darwin Shaw as Clinton
- Taishi Mizuno as Hideo
- Travis Richey as Gary Bascomb
- Cher Álvarez as Teresa Vasquez
- Scott Lawrence as Dr. Vickers
- Paula Andrea Placido as Charlie
- Jonathan Slavin as Everett Roberts
- Jayne Taini as Helen Sugar
- Isabella Briggs as Taylor
- Adrian Martinez as Glen
- Ben Mankiewicz as himself
- Eliza Blair as Dani
- Paul Schulze as Miller
- Julie Dretzin as the Producer
- Cameron Cowperthwaite as Ryan Pavich

Season 2

- Nona Parker Johnson as Hannah McDaniels
- Catfish Jean as Blaine Bosco
- Erin Wu as Tala
- Devon Odessa as Bunny
- Rene Moran as Jose "Lolli" Guapo
- Matt Murray as Demo
- Gloria Laino as Beatriz Jaquez
- Vanessa Martinez as Sandra Jaquez
- Rell Battle as Len Pankow
- Eileen Fogarty as Deb
- Daniel Zacapa as Sergey Ojeda
- LisaGay Hamilton as Betty Spiro

== Episodes ==
=== Series overview ===
Season	Episodes	Originally released		
Season	Episodes	First released	Last released	Network
1	8	April 5, 2024	May 17, 2024	Apple TV+
2	8	June 19, 2026	August 7, 2026	Apple TV

=== Season 1 (2024) ===
No. overall	No. in season	Title	Directed by	Written by	Original release date
1	1	"Olivia"	Fernando Meirelles	Mark Protosevich	April 5, 2024
In Tokyo, private investigator John Sugar recovers the kidnapped son of a Yakuza leader, but sustains a cut to his left shoulder in the process. Shortly after, he is offered a new case and returns to Los Angeles. There, Sugar, who is revealed to be an avid cinephile and a polyglot, meets with Jonathan Siegel, a legendary film producer whose granddaughter, Olivia, has gone missing. Despite her history of drug-related disappearances, this time Siegel is deeply concerned by her lack of contact. Sugar's handler Ruby expresses misgivings about him taking on the case, but Sugar insists, saying that Olivia reminds him of his sister Djen. He begins his investigation at Olivia's apartment, where he encounters her half-brother David and his bodyguard, Kenny, who act uncooperatively. In the apartment, Sugar finds a suitcase full of memorabilia dedicated to Olivia's late mother, Rachel Kaye, from when she was a young actress. He then tracks Melanie Matthews, who used to be Olivia's stepmother. They bond over expensive whisky, and Sugar reveals that he metabolizes alcohol unusually quickly, allowing him to drink large amounts of alcohol without feeling drunk. He takes Melanie home, but rebuffs her advances. His investigation leads him to discover a dead body in Olivia's car. In his hotel suite, Sugar receives a mysterious invitation to a party by a society of polyglots. After finding compromising Polaroid photos of Rachel Kaye hidden in Olivia's suitcase, suggesting that Olivia was digging into her mother's past, Sugar seems to experience neurological sequels from the wound on his shoulder, which has reopened. He injects himself with a mysterious intravenous substance before losing consciousness.
2	2	"These People, These Places"	Fernando Meirelles	Mark Protosevich	April 5, 2024
Sugar meets with Bernie Siegel, Olivia's father, who appears indifferent about her disappearance, assuming she's on another drug-fueled escapade. Bernie denies having taken the compromising photographs of his late wife, and becomes defensive when questioned. David Siegel and Kenny break into Sugar's hotel room, trying to gather information about him. Sugar interrogates several of Olivia's friends and learns that she had been sober, not purchasing drugs in at least a year. Meanwhile, it is revealed that several women are accusing David of sexual misconduct and that Bernie and his team are trying to cover it up. Sugar identifies the dead man found in Olivia's car as Clifford Carter, a criminal linked to the recent murder of Carmen Vazquez, whom Olivia had been visiting. Jonathan Siegel asks Sugar to dispose of Carter's body to avoid implicating Olivia in the crime, but when Sugar returns to the car, the body has disappeared. Sugar meets again with Melanie Matthews, who remains cagey about her relationship with Olivia and, like Bernie, dismisses the urgency of her disappearance. She pretends not to recognize a picture of Carter, but Sugar does not believe her. Convinced that she knows Olivia's whereabouts, he hires civilian Charlie to keep tabs on her. Teresa Vazquez, Carmen's sister, is visited by gangster Byron Stallings and his goons, who are looking for Carter and think Melanie may have answers.
3	3	"Shibuya Crossing"	Adam Arkin	Mark Protosevich and David Rosen	April 12, 2024
Melanie is tricked into going to Teresa's, where Stallings aggressively interrogates both women about Carter's whereabouts and threatens to torture them. Sugar, tipped off by Charlie, manages to rescue Melanie and Teresa by posing as a parole officer and distracting the gangsters with a smoke bomb. Melanie reveals to Sugar that Olivia killed Carter in self-defense after discovering him with Carmen's body. Olivia, fearful of scandal tarnishing her family's name, persuaded Melanie not to report the incident, and went into hiding. Despite her knowledge and involvement, Melanie asserts that she doesn't know Olivia's current whereabouts but is deeply concerned for her safety. Meanwhile, Kenny digs into Sugar's past and uncovers details about the mysterious polyglot society, which he suspects to be a network of international spies. Sugar's shoulder injury continues to bother him. He attends the reunion of the polyglot society, which is hosted by Ruby and framed as an innocuous party. There, Sugar reconnects with his old friend Henry, an anthropologist. It is implied that the 'polyglots' may all be working in service of an overarching mission, observing and reporting on personal interactions, using their stated professions as a cover. Assessing Sugar's latest report, Ruby expresses frustration with his emotional involvement in cases and warns of potential repercussions for his continued investigation into Olivia's case. She comments on his poor health and insists he book an appointment with Dr. Vickers. Later, she calls Vickers to warn him about Sugar getting too close to the truth, before purging information about Stallings from various law enforcement databases.
4	4	"Starry-Eyed"	Adam Arkin	Mark Protosevich and Donald Joh	April 19, 2024
Sugar gets a check-up with Dr. Vickers, who asks him about his use of intravenous drugs and expresses concern about his mental health. With Melanie's help, Sugar then tracks Taylor, a friend of Olivia's who eventually reveals that David Siegel sexually blackmailed her, that there were other victims, and that Olivia was aware of it. Meanwhile, David and Kenny escalate their efforts to undermine Sugar by travelling to Arizona to visit who they think is his mother. The woman, Helen, charms them but gives them no information. Ruby feeds false information to Sugar about Byron Stallings, omitting any serious criminal details. Sugar wants to update Jonathan Siegel, who in lieu of a meeting invites Sugar to a party for the screening of one of his early productions. There, Sugar observes Bernie and Melanie having a covert conversation, deducing that she is still hiding something. The allegations against David become public during the screening. Shortly after being informed, Jonathan suffers a heart attack backstage. Sugar notices that the gold dress worn by the lead actress in the movie is the same dress worn by Rachel Kaye in the racy Polaroids from Olivia's suitcase. On his way back from Arizona, David receives a threatening call from Stallings, who warns him not to implicate him. Stallings later leaves for the Mexican border. His den is revealed to have a cellar with a padlocked door, which he calls his "special project", and one of his cronies is seen wearing a necklace belonging to Olivia.
5	5	"Boy in the Corner"	Fernando Meirelles	Mark Protosevich	April 26, 2024
Sugar visits a recovering Jonathan, and sees the gold dress in his personal archives, intuiting a connection between the veteran producer and the young Rachel Kaye. Sugar then interrogates David, who eventually confesses that Stallings was providing him with young women for sexual services. He explains that he developed a friendship with Stallings and at some point confided in him about the allegations against him, as well as about Olivia encouraging one of the victims (implied to be Taylor) to go public and not settle, hoping that Stallings might scare Olivia into being silent. He gives Stallings' address to Sugar. Meanwhile, Ruby meets with Miller, another member of their organization, who tells her to stop Sugar from looking more into the case by any means necessary. That evening, Melanie arrives home late to find one of Stallings' henchmen in her house. She fights him off and locks herself in the bathroom. Sugar, checking in with Charlie and noticing the gangster's truck parked outside Melanie's, arrives to save her just in time. He violently beats up the thug, scaring Melanie, before letting him go and inviting her to stay with him at his hotel. Stallings arrives at Tijuana and meets human traffickers, forcibly separating some of the younger Mexican women from their families. After narcissistically reminiscing about his child actor career and being comforted by his mother, David shoots himself in the head.
6	6	"Go Home"	Fernando Meirelles	Donald Joh and Sam Catlin	May 3, 2024
David is rushed to a hospital and is declared alive, but brain dead. Charlie, having staked out Stallings' home, warns Sugar that Stallings has returned. Sugar calms Stallings' vicious doberman dogs simply by talking to them. In the house, Sugar is ambushed by Stallings and two of his acolytes, all heavily armed. They reveal they have been tipped off about his arrival, beat him up, and plan to murder him. Sugar pleads with them to stop the violence, saying he does not want to kill them. When Stallings orders his crony to shoot him in the head, Sugar somehow deflects the bullet with his hand. Seemingly showing superhuman strength and speed, he overpowers all three, incapacitating Stallings and killing both acolytes, although he is stabbed in the stomach in the process. He then interrogates Stallings, who refuses to tell him anything, so Sugar executes him. Checking Stallings' phone, he recognizes Ruby's number as the one warning them of his arrival. He investigates behind the locked door in the basement, but finds only caged dogs. Unable to contact Charlie and gravely injured, Sugar asks Melanie to meet him at a nearby motel. There, he refuses to be taken to the hospital, but asks her to contact his friend Henry, saying he is a doctor. Henry arrives, asks Melanie to go get a supply of drugs at the drugstore, and conducts surgery in her absence, apparently giving Sugar a transfusion of a mysterious shimmering blood-like liquid. A partially recovered Sugar confronts Ruby at her home, but she refuses to reveal her reasons for warning Stallings, reiterating instead that Sugar needs to stop investigating. Sugar asks her if Olivia has been trafficked to someone being protected by their organization, and Ruby doesn't answer. She offers him an aspirin and, after checking in the kitchen, goes upstairs to get some, but he abruptly leaves before she returns. She finds the kitchen drawer she approached open with aspirin inside. Back in the motel, while Melanie is sleeping, he again injects himself in the neck with his intravenous drug kit, saying that he wants to take a break and "go home" for the evening. As he stands in front of the mirror, he transforms into a blue-skinned humanoid.
7	7	"The Friends You Keep"	Adam Arkin	Donald Joh and Sam Catlin	May 10, 2024
Ruby and Miller use a strange typewriter-like device to send a message, and after receiving a reply, Miller leaves in search of Sugar. Sugar awakens in the motel room to find that Melanie has been watching over him. Attending David's Jewish funeral, Jonathan comforts Bernie, who now believes Olivia is truly in danger and missing due to her absence. Miller arrives at the hotel with backup and, after a scuffle, subdues Sugar by grabbing his neck and lifting him up in the air with a single hand, but Melanie knocks Miller over with a towel bar, and they run away. Melanie demands answers but Sugar can only reveal that he belongs to a clandestine organization and that being a private detective is only his "day job," leading her to believe he is a spy. Sugar tries to warn Henry at his university job, but finds that Miller has gotten to him first. Sugar later tails Miller to a mysterious house, only to find upon entry that many of his fellow "polyglots" are there. Ruby reveals that the mission is over, and they have been called home. Henry tells Sugar that some influential and powerful humans found out about their presence, and have been blackmailing them threatening to reveal their extraterrestrial presence unless they help them. That is why Ruby and Miller tried to make him back off the Siegel case. Henry expresses his opinion that the more they stay among humans, the more they become like them, which Sugar agrees with after admitting he killed Stallings not because he had to, but because he felt like it. After Henry gives him an address, Sugar breaks into the house of a senator's son, finding the basement, but is taken captive by a security guard. He tries to report that a girl is held captive there, only to realize the guard is really the senator's son himself. The cuffed Sugar still manages to subdue the son, who suddenly shoots himself in the head. Sugar investigates the basement, finding an array of torture and slaughtering devices, and stacks of recordings. He opens a locked cabinet under the stairs, muttering "Olivia".
8	8	"Farewell"	Fernando Meirelles	Donald Joh and Sam Catlin	May 17, 2024
Sugar finds Olivia in the cabinet, hurt but alive. He returns her to Melanie, and notifies the police. Afterwards, Miller is stopped by a cop while driving and is shot and killed. Sugar meets Ruby and Henry, asking the latter for a CD player, and starts listening to the senator's son's recordings about his torture and murder sessions. Sugar visits Jonathan, and offers his condolences to David's mother. Jonathan wants to hire him as chief of security, but he politely declines, and gives him the photos. Jonathan admits that he had a short relationship with Rachel, Bernie's first wife, confirming that Olivia is his daughter, not Bernie's. After leaving his dog with Melanie, he says goodbye to her, and breaking rules, briefly reveals his alien eyes to her. He also reveals he became a PI after his sister was abducted and never found. As he continues to listen to the recording, he suddenly realizes that the killer was not alone. Talking to Olivia, she says she never saw the second person's face, nor heard him talk, but he has been writing notes all the time. This makes Sugar realize the accomplice was Henry. He drives back to Ruby's place, where Henry calls him on the phone, confirming this. He states he did it to learn from humans, and decides he will stay on Earth. Before breaking the call, he tells Sugar he left rose petals for him - the petals lead to a cupboard which contains the clothes of Djen, Sugar's sister. Sugar meets Ruby at the departure point, who confirms they knew about the experiments with the killer, which was Henry's idea, but not about Djen. Despite the likelihood that his sister is already dead, Sugar decides to stay behind as Henry is their people's responsibility, and departs to find him.

=== Season 2 (2026) ===
No. overall	No. in season	Title	Directed by	Written by	Original release date
9	1	"Home Away from Home"	Michael Morris	Sam Catlin	June 19, 2026
10	2	"Downer Town"	Michael Morris	Gary Tieche	June 26, 2026
11	3	"Watch Face"	Amat Escalante	Christopher C. Rogers	July 3, 2026
12	4	"Off 15"	Amat Escalante	Jonny Gomez	July 10, 2026
13	5	"Unknowns"	Adam Bernstein	Michael A. Bhim	July 17, 2026
14	6	"Cautionary Tale"	Adam Bernstein	Megan Ritchie	July 24, 2026
15	7	"What Else Can You Do?"	Michael Morris	Sam Alper & Christopher C. Rogers	July 31, 2026
16	8	"Like Sugar"	Michael Morris	Sam Catlin	August 7, 2026

== Production ==
It was announced in December 2021 that Apple TV+ had won a bidding war for the rights to the series, which had Colin Farrell attached to star. Farrell would officially join the series in June 2022, when it was given the greenlight from Apple TV+. In August 2022, Kirby, Amy Ryan, Dennis Boutsikaris, Alex Hernandez and Lindsay Pulsipher joined the main cast, with Anna Gunn and James Cromwell cast to recur. In September, Nate Corddry, Sydney Chandler, Miguel Sandoval, Elizabeth Anweis and Jason Butler Harner were added to the cast. Karyn McCarthy was offered a producer role on the series but declined in favor of the Disney+ series The Acolyte. Production for the series began in August 2022, which was expected to extend into the fall, delaying another project for series star Farrell. Mark Protosevich and Simon Kinberg served as the showrunners for the first season.

In October 2024, the series was renewed for a second season. In March 2025, Jin Ha, Laura Donnelly, and Tony Dalton were announced to have joined the cast as series regulars for the second season. In April, Shea Whigham, Raymond Lee, and Sasha Calle were also announced to have joined the cast as series regulars. That same month, production for the second season had begun and later wrapped in August 2025. Sam Catlin served as the showrunner for the second season.

== Release ==
The first season premiered on April 5, 2024, on Apple TV+. The second season premiered on June 19, 2026.

== Reception ==
On review aggregator Rotten Tomatoes, 81% of 79 critics gave the first season a positive review, with an average of rated reviews of 7.20/10. The website's critics consensus reads, "A modern noir steeped in the classic tradition, Sugar could use stronger clues to go along with its ample style, but Colin Farrell's cool performance keeps things compelling." On Metacritic, the first season holds a weighted average score of 67 out of 100 based on 25 critics, indicating "generally favorable reviews".

For the second season, Rotten Tomatoes reported that 97% of 36 critics gave the second season a positive review, with an average of rated reviews of 7.50/10. The website's critics consensus reads, "Colin Farrell remains out of this world in his deduction, dedication, and emotional depth within Sugar season two, aptly bestowing audiences with a rich noir tale and sci-fi trappings that expertly adapt to the story at hand." On Metacritic, the second season holds a weighted average score of 73 out of 100 based on 13 critics, indicating "generally favorable reviews".

=== Awards and nominations ===
Award	Date of ceremony	Category	Nominee(s)	Result	Ref.
Astra TV Awards	August 18, 2024	Best Actor in a Streaming Drama Series	Colin Farrell	Nominated	
Astra TV Awards	August 18, 2024	Best Supporting Actress in a Streaming Drama Series	Amy Ryan	Nominated	
Astra TV Awards	August 18, 2024	Best Directing in a Streaming Drama Series	Fernando Meirelles (for "Olivia")	Nominated	
Primetime Creative Arts Emmy Awards	September 7–8, 2024	Outstanding Cinematography for a Single-Camera Series (Half-Hour)	Richard Rutkowski (for "Starry Eyed")	Nominated	
Artios Awards	February 12, 2025	Outstanding Achievement in Casting – Television Pilot and First Season Drama	Sherry Thomas, Sharon Bialy, Rebecca Mangieri, Samantha Rood	Nominated	
Saturn Awards	February 2, 2025	Best Adventure Television Series	Sugar	Nominated	
Critics' Choice Super Awards	August 6, 2026	Best Actor in a Science Fiction/Fantasy Series	Colin Farrell	Nominated	
