= Forbidden Fruits =

2026 film by Meredith Alloway

- Theatrical release poster
- Directed by: Meredith Alloway
- Screenplay by: Lily Houghton; Meredith Alloway
- Based on: Of the woman came the beginning of sin, and through her we all die by Lily Houghton
- Produced by: Mason Novick; Diablo Cody; Mary Anne Waterhouse; Trent Hubbard
- Starring: Lili Reinhart; Lola Tung; Victoria Pedretti; Alexandra Shipp; Emma Chamberlain; Gabrielle Union
- Cinematography: Karim Hussain
- Edited by: Hanna Park
- Music by: Anna Drubich
- Production companies: MXN Entertainment; Quadrant Motion Pictures; Lollipop Woods
- Distributed by: Independent Film Company / Shudder (United States and Canada) (Note: excludes Quebec (Film Service Supérieur Inc.)); Universal Pictures (International)
- Release dates: March 16, 2026 (SXSW); March 27, 2026 (United States)
- Running time: 103 minutes
- Country: United States
- Language: English
- Box office: $2.4 million

Forbidden Fruits is a 2026 American comedy horror film starring Lili Reinhart, Lola Tung, Victoria Pedretti, Alexandra Shipp, Emma Chamberlain, and Gabrielle Union. It is directed by Meredith Alloway from a screenplay she co-wrote with Lily Houghton, based on Houghton's 2019 stage play Of the woman came the beginning of sin, and through her we all die.

The film had its world premiere at the South by Southwest Film & TV Festival on March 16, 2026, before being released by Independent Film Company and Shudder on March 27, 2026, and internationally by Universal Pictures. It received mixed reviews from critics.

== Plot ==
Apple, Fig, and Cherry are glamorous saleswomen at the Free Eden clothing store in a shopping mall in Dallas, Texas, where they scam customers into spending thousands of dollars. They are approached by a new girl who works at a pretzel counter in the food court. Despite their aversion to food court workers, their interest is piqued when she reveals her name is Pumpkin.

Pumpkin completes an awkward interview and is invited to stay after hours. The trio reveal themselves to be a coven of witches, conducting rituals in the basement of the store, forbidding boyfriends and confessing their sins to the spirit of Marilyn Monroe. After feeding Pumpkin a concoction of fruit juice and blood, the trio abandon her in the locked store.

They return in the morning to find Pumpkin more outwardly confident and stylishly dressed. Apple gifts Pumpkin a charm bracelet, matching with the other Free Eden girls. A dishevelled young woman appears outside of the store, upsetting Cherry and Fig, and prompting Apple to rush Pumpkin out of sight. Pumpkin gifts Apple a doll that the latter names "Marilyn"; unbeknownst to the coven, the doll has a camera inside of it.

As months pass, Pumpkin learns more about each girl—Apple frequently gets in trouble with their mysterious manager Sharon, is living in her car, and allegedly poisoned her abusive father; Cherry is sober, and her life is micromanaged by Apple; Fig is trying to get into graduate school and is seeing a man named Norman.

Pumpkin bonds with Cherry after catching her having sexual flings with male mall employees while Apple believes she is at therapy. When Pumpkin catches Fig and Norman confessing their mutual love, Fig begs her not to tell Apple and reveals that Pumpkin's predecessor, Pickle, was part of the coven until she fell in love with a man named Ashton. Apple tricked the coven into placing a hex on her, resulting in Ashton falling into a coma and Pickle being institutionalized.

Pumpkin spots and approaches Pickle, who implores her to escape the coven and warns her that Apple is dangerous. Pumpkin begins having private conversations with Sharon, leading a paranoid Apple to demand they cast a hex on the interloper in their group. Pickle later commits suicide by jumping from the second story at the mall, while Pumpkin and Fig look on in horror.

The women grow paranoid and accusatory towards one another, wondering who in the group is the interloper. Apple calls an emergency meeting as a tornado warning is issued. Fig quits the coven, distraught over Pickle's suicide, and reveals that her real name is Emily. When Norman arrives to save Fig, an increasingly agitated Cherry strikes him with a meat cleaver, causing both him and Fig to flee in terror. The mall is placed on lockdown, trapping Cherry, Apple, and Pumpkin inside.

Cherry angrily confronts Apple about her cruel and controlling nature, whereupon Apple kisses her but is promptly rebuffed. Fig returns to the mall, having been dumped by Norman. While fleeing a vengeful Apple, Cherry becomes trapped in the mall's malfunctioning escalator. Fig and Pumpkin attempt to help her, but Apple refuses, allowing her to be crushed to death. A glass skylight then shatters and bisects Fig's head.

Apple and Pumpkin wash off the other girls' blood in the mall fountain. Pumpkin reveals that she is Apple's paternal half-sister, having tracked Apple down to seek justice for their father's murder. They fight over their conflicting views of their father, culminating in Apple strangling Pumpkin to death, subsequently leaving her in the fountain.

Apple goes on the run and visits a different mall in Scottsdale, Arizona, where she meets three stylish girls all named after flowers and wearing matching charm bracelets. They offer her a job at a Free Eden that will be opening soon.

A mid-credit scene reveals that Sharon is an undercover police detective who has been investigating Apple. Noticing the doll, still recording, at the crime scene, she collects it to use as evidence.

== Cast ==
- Lili Reinhart as Apple
- Lola Tung as Pumpkin
- Victoria Pedretti as Cherry
- Alexandra Shipp as Fig “Emily”
- Emma Chamberlain as Pickle
- Gabrielle Union as Sharon Sullivan

== Production ==
The film is directed by Meredith Alloway, in her feature-length debut, which she co-wrote with Lily Houghton, and adapted from Houghton's 2019 play Of the woman came the beginning of sin, and through her we all die. It is produced by Mason Novick, Diablo Cody, Trent Hubbard, and Mary Anne Waterhouse through MXN Entertainment. The script was featured on the 2023 Black List of the "most liked" screenplays currently not in production.

The cast is led by Lili Reinhart, Lola Tung, Victoria Pedretti, Alexandra Shipp and Emma Chamberlain, in her acting debut. Principal photography began in Toronto in March 2025. In April 2025, Gabrielle Union joined the cast.

== Release ==
Forbidden Fruits premiered at the South by Southwest Film & TV Festival on March 16, 2026, and was released in the United States on March 27, 2026.

It will be screened in Panorama section of the 59th Sitges Film Festival in October 2026.

== Reception ==
On the review aggregator website Rotten Tomatoes, 76% of 90 critics' reviews are positive, with an average rating of 6.6/10. The website's consensus reads: "Charmingly goofy and packed up with incisive insights into the relatable ups and downs of any friend group, Forbidden Fruits is a campy coven worth hanging out for its concise runtime." Metacritic, which uses a weighted average, assigned the film a score of 56 out of 100, based on nine critics, indicating "mixed or average" reviews.
