= Isabella Briggs =

American actress

- Born: Los Angeles, California, U.S.
- Occupation: Actress
- Years active: 2014–present
- Known for: The Summer I Turned Pretty

Isabella Briggs is an American actress. She is best known for playing Denise Russo in season 3 of the Prime Video series The Summer I Turned Pretty (2025).

== Early life ==
Briggs was born and raised in Los Angeles. She developed an early interest in acting and began appearing in commercials and print ads as a child.

She studied drama at the Carnegie Mellon School of Drama. After graduating, she moved to New York City to pursue her career.

== Career ==
Briggs made her screen debut in the feature film After School (2014). She later appeared in several television projects, including the miniseries Fatal Attraction (2023), where she portrayed Stella in five episodes.

She also guest-starred in Evil (2024) and Sugar (2024).

Briggs gained international attention in 2025 when she joined the cast of The Summer I Turned Pretty as Denise Russo, a new character created exclusively for the series.

== Personal life ==
Briggs lives in New York City. She has been in a relationship with artist Mikael Gemeda-Breka since 2019.

== Filmography ==
=== Television ===
Year	Title	Role	Notes
2014	After School	Nadia	Feature film
2018	Mi Amor	Rachel	Short film
2023	Fatal Attraction	Stella	Miniseries, 5 episodes
2024	Evil	Megan Tyree	1 episode
2024	Sugar	Taylor	1 episode
2025	The Summer I Turned Pretty	Denise Russo	11 episodes
2026	Inside These Walls	Ava	Short Film
