= Coming Home Again =

2019 drama film

- Film poster
- Directed by: Wayne Wang
- Written by: Wayne Wang; Chang-Rae Lee
- Based on: “Coming Home Again” by Chang-Rae Lee
- Produced by: Donald Young
- Starring: Justin Chon
- Cinematography: Richard Wong
- Edited by: Ashley Pagan; Deidre Slevin
- Release dates: September 7, 2019 (Toronto); March 2, 2021
- Running time: 86 minutes
- Countries: United States; South Korea
- Language: English

Coming Home Again is a 2019 American-South Korean drama film directed by Wayne Wang and starring Justin Chon. It is based on a 1995 New Yorker essay by Chang-Rae Lee, who co-wrote the screenplay with Wang. The film premiered as part of the 2019 Toronto International Film Festival.

The film follows Chang-rae, a first-generation Korean-American who returns to his childhood home in San Francisco to care for his ailing mother.

== Cast ==
- Justin Chon as Chang-rae
- Jackie Chung as Mom
- Christina July Kim as Jiyoung
- John Lie as Dad

== Release ==
The film had its world premiere on September 7, 2019, at the 2019 Toronto International Film Festival, and was released on DVD and VOD in the United States on March 2, 2021.

== Reception ==
The film has a 92% rating on Rotten Tomatoes, based on 24 reviews with an average rating of 7.6/10.
