= Of the woman came the beginning of sin, and through her we all die =

2019 play by Lily Houghton

- Written by: Lily Houghton

Premiere
- Date premiered: October 3, 2019

Of the woman came the beginning of sin, and through her we all die, sometimes shortened to Of the woman, is a 2019 play by Lily Houghton.

== Synopsis ==
Bluebell, Sweet Pea, and Bleeding Heart are part of a makeshift coven in the basement of Free People, the clothing store where they work. They welcome new employee, Pumpkin, into their ranks.

== Productions ==
Of the woman premiered in October 2019 at the Medicine Show Theatre in New York City, produced by Normal Ave and Leigh Honigman and directed by Kylie M. Brown. The production starred Ianne Fields Stewart as Bluebell, Carolyn Kettig as Bleeding Heart, Sabina Friedman-Seitz as Sweet Pea, Kirsten Harvey as Pumpkin, Starr Kirkland as Janet, and Bear Brummel as Man and featured set design by Brittany Vasta, costume design by Alice Tavener, lighting design by Catherine Clark, and sound design by Ash Zeitler.

== Adaptation ==
Of the woman has been adapted into a film called Forbidden Fruits, co-written by Houghton and Meredith Alloway, and directed by Alloway.
