= The Devil's Mouth =

2026 film by Jeff Wadlow

- Release poster
- Directed by: Jeff Wadlow
- Screenplay by: Aja Gabel; Myung Joh Wesner
- Produced by: Jeff Wadlow; Basil Iwanyk; Erica Lee
- Starring: Kathryn Newton; Lana Condor; Gavin Casalegno; Nico Hiraga; Tommi Rose; Tayme Thapthimthong
- Cinematography: James Kniest
- Edited by: Sean Albertson
- Music by: Bear McCreary
- Production companies: Lionsgate; Thunder Road Films
- Distributed by: Amazon MGM Studios (via Prime Video) (Note: Released through the Metro-Goldwyn-Mayer banner.)
- Release date: July 29, 2026
- Running time: 104 minutes
- Country: United States
- Language: English

The Devil's Mouth is a 2026 American survival thriller film directed by Jeff Wadlow. The film stars Kathryn Newton, Lana Condor, Gavin Casalegno, and Nico Hiraga. In the film, a group of friends exploring an underwater cave system fight for survival against a ravenous bull shark. The Devil's Mouth was released on July 29, 2026, on Amazon Prime Video.

== Plot ==
Sara funds a graduation trip to bring her friends Max, James, Adrianne, and Greg to Thailand and explore The Devil's Mouth, a local cave her recently deceased father loved. On the cruise, Max pressures Sara to move with her to Los Angeles and abandon the dream job offer she received in New York. That night, Sara swims alone while the rest party on the boat. Max forgets about Sara and lets the boat leave, leaving Sara stranded in the water, where she is stung by several jellyfish. After a brief argument where Max refuses to take blame, they reconcile. Later, the group finds a half-eaten turtle washed ashore.

The next day, the group sets out for the Devil's Mouth with their guide, Wat. To Sara and Wat's dismay, the group elects to take Max's more dangerous route. During the expedition, Sara learns that Max paid Wat extra to look after her. Wat tells the group that a recent storm flooded the cave, bringing in marine life. Upon reaching the Devil's Mouth, Max insists on swimming deeper. Adrianna injures her leg, which Max disregards. While exploring the inner cave, Sara finds the body of the diver they had encountered earlier. Their resurfaced equipment bears shark teeth. Wat decides to leave on his own after an argument with Max, realizing that staying with them puts him at risk. Meanwhile, the blood from Adrianne's injury attracts the shark.

The group attempts to make their way back, but a bull shark kills Greg and severely injures Adrienne. They retreat to a cliff face, and Sara suggests escaping through tunnels too narrow for the shark to enter. While arguing over whether to wait for Wat, they hear him being killed. Sara devises a route to escape. Max proposes leaving Adrienne behind, but Sara and James protest. The shark attacks again, killing Adrienne. Frustrated by Max's constant control, James argues with her, enraging Max, and she leaves alone. Sara and James follow her, and James criticizes Sara's complacency.

After a long swim, they find a narrow, dry tunnel that requires them to crawl through it. While crawling, the tunnel suddenly collapses, causing Max to fall into the water below. Sara and James jump in to rescue her. During the swim, James becomes trapped between rocks and, unable to free himself, tells Sara and Max to leave him. They reluctantly continue, and James eventually suffocates. Sara encourages Max to keep moving as the shark catches up with them. She uses a floating body as bait to distract it, but realizes they have been swimming in circles and have returned to the area where Adrianne was killed. Sara again suggests taking the tunnel to the open ocean, but Max insists on continuing through the main route. The shark spots Max's headlamp, and despite Sara's warnings to hide among the stalagmites, Max swims ahead. When she climbs onto the cave wall after spotting the shark, it rams into the wall, causing part of the cave to collapse. Max injures her hand. Sara distracts the shark with a flare and throws it into its mouth, injuring it. Max loses consciousness, and Sara carries her through the cave. She eventually finds a small opening to the ocean. The two rest on a rock, where Max apologizes for controlling their friendship and never listening to Sara. She agrees to move to New York with Sara.

Sara reaches the opening and discovers that the climb to the surface and descent to the ocean are steep and covered with loose rocks. She manages to climb partway up and decides to make the descent at night when the tide is high. Since Max cannot climb with her injured hand, they agree that Sara will go alone and get help. At the last moment, however, Max insists on going with her.

As they climb, the shark kills Max, causing Sara to fall back into the cave as well, as they are connected by a rope. Sara cuts the rope, separating herself from Max. Alone in the cave, she remembers Wat's warnings about the unstable cave walls. She lures the shark toward her, and the shark crashes into a wall, which causes part of the cave to collapse, crushing it. Sara then continues searching for a way out and discovers another opening leading toward land. Seeing signs of civilization outside, she climbs through the opening and cries out in joy.

== Cast ==
- Kathryn Newton as Sara McKenna
- Lana Condor as Max Leviton
- Gavin Casalegno as Greg
- Nico Hiraga as James
- Tommi Rose as Adrienne
- Tayme Thapthimthong as Wat

== Production ==
In December 2019, Apex, written by Aja Gabel and Myung Joh Wesner, was featured on the Hollywood Black List of the most liked unproduced scripts. In May 2023, it was announced that Jeff Wadlow would direct the film, retitled The Devil's Mouth. Producers include Thunder Road Films' Basil Iwanyk and Erica Lee, and Wadlow. Two years later, in May 2025, it was announced that Amazon MGM Studios and Lionsgate Films would co-produce the film. Kathryn Newton and Lana Condor signed on to star. In August, Gavin Casalegno, Nico Hiraga, Tommi Rose, and Tayme Thapthimthong joined the cast. The roles were physically demanding for the actors, with Wadlow saying that "the rock climbing, diving, underwater work, breath holds, getting dragged around on winches, that was all them".

The script was initially set in Mexico but the entire film was ultimately shot in Thailand, with Wadlow rewriting the script. Wadlow wanted the vacation to "look awesome and fun, and the location seem beautiful and appealing…I wanted it to be obvious why they’re on the trip. It’s an amazing place to visit. Then I wanted to go into real caves that were mysterious and beautiful and not foreboding at all. I wanted the audience on the adventure". Principal photography took place in freshwater caves that are ordinarily used for training by rescue divers, as well as on two sound stages. Filming locations included Krabi province, Chiang Mai and Bangkok, Thailand, and took eight weeks and was completed by September 2025, with James Kniest as the cinematographer.

Bear McCreary composed the score for the film.

== Release ==
It was released on Amazon Prime Video on July 29, 2026.

== Reception ==
On the review aggregator website Rotten Tomatoes, 40% of 47 critics' reviews are positive, with an average rating of 4.8/10. Metacritic, which uses a weighted average, assigned the film a score of 46 out of 100, based on eight critics, indicating "mixed or average" reviews.
