= The Summer I Turned Pretty (TV series) =

American drama television series

- Genre: Coming-of-age; Romantic drama
- Created by: Jenny Han
- Based on: The Summer I Turned Pretty by Jenny Han
- Showrunners: Jenny Han; Gabrielle Stanton; Sarah Kucserka
- Starring: Lola Tung; Jackie Chung; Rachel Blanchard; Christopher Briney; Gavin Casalegno; Sean Kaufman; Alfredo Narciso; Minnie Mills; Colin Ferguson; Tom Everett Scott; Rain Spencer; Elsie Fisher; Kyra Sedgwick; Isabella Briggs; Kristen Connolly
- Music by: Zachary Dawes
- Country of origin: United States
- Original language: English
- No. of seasons: 3
- No. of episodes: 26

Production
- Executive producers: Hope Hartman; Mads Hansen; Nne Ebong; Jesse Peretz; Karen Rosenfelt; Gabrielle Stanton; Jenny Han; Sarah Kucserka; Megan Griffiths; Paul Lee
- Producers: Marty Scott; Nicole Colombie; Sophie Rain
- Cinematography: J.B. Smith; Sandra Valde-Hansen; Tarin Anderson
- Editors: Jamie Kennedy; Lauren Schaffer; Lindsay Armstrong; Alisa Lepselter; Sean Fawcett; Victor Du Bois; Martin Wilson; Kate Hickey; Isabella Dinh; Isla Nobel
- Running time: 39–79 minutes
- Production companies: Amazon MGM Studios; wiip; Sunswept Entertainment; Jenny Kissed Me; Big Red Bus; Neon Stories

Original release
- Network: Amazon Prime Video
- Release: June 17, 2022 – September 17, 2025

The Summer I Turned Pretty is an American coming-of-age romantic drama television series created by author Jenny Han for Amazon Prime Video. It is based on Jenny's novel trilogy: The Summer I Turned Pretty, It's Not Summer Without You, and We'll Always Have Summer. Lola Tung stars as Isabel "Belly" Conklin, a teenager involved in a love triangle with brothers Conrad and Jeremiah, played by Christopher Briney and Gavin Casalegno, respectively.

Production on the TV series began in 2021. It premiered on June 17, 2022, with the first season consisting of seven episodes. Before its premiere, the series was renewed for a second season, which debuted on July 14, 2023, and includes eight episodes. In August 2023, the series was renewed for a third season. The 11-episode third and final season premiered on July 16, 2025. A feature-length film was announced following the series conclusion on September 17, 2025, and is set to serve as a direct continuation of the series finale.

== Premise ==
Belly Conklin is about to turn sixteen and travels with her mother and brother to Cousins Beach, the beachfront town where they have spent every summer with the Fisher family. As Belly enters a new stage of adolescence, she begins to experience growing independence, shifting family dynamics, and the complexities of long-standing friendships. Over the course of the summer, she finds herself at the center of new social experiences and romantic tensions, especially as her relationships with Conrad and Jeremiah Fisher start to change. The series follows Belly's emotional coming-of-age as she navigates first love, self-discovery, and the bittersweet transition from childhood to adulthood, all set against the backdrop of the families’ deeply connected history.

== Cast and characters ==
=== Main ===
- Lola Tung as Isabel "Belly" Conklin, a teenager who is involved in a love triangle between two brothers, Conrad and Jeremiah
- Jackie Chung as Laurel Park, Belly and Steven's mother, an author
- Rachel Blanchard as Susannah Fisher, Conrad and Jeremiah's mother
- Christopher Briney as Conrad Fisher, Susannah's eldest son
- Gavin Casalegno as Jeremiah Fisher, Susannah's younger son
- Sean Kaufman as Steven Conklin, Belly's older brother
- Alfredo Narciso as Cleveland Castillo (season 1; guest season 2), an author living in Cousins for the summer
- Minnie Mills as Shayla (season 1), Belly's fellow debutante and Steven's love interest and deb escort
- Colin Ferguson as John Conklin, Laurel's ex-husband, Belly and Steven's father, a historian
- Tom Everett Scott as Adam Fisher, Conrad and Jeremiah's father, a venture capitalist
- Rain Spencer as Taylor Jewel (seasons 2–3; recurring season 1), Belly's best friend
- Elsie Fisher as Skye (season 2), Julia's child and Conrad and Jeremiah's cousin
- Kyra Sedgwick as Julia (season 2), Susannah's estranged older half-sister and Skye's mother
- Isabella Briggs as Denise (season 3), Steven's office co-worker
- Kristen Connolly as Lucinda Jewel (season 3), Taylor's mother

=== Recurring ===
- David Iacono as Cam (seasons 1–2), a Cousins Beach local and Belly's love interest
- Summer Madison as Nicole (seasons 1–2), Belly's friend and Conrad's love interest
- Sofia Bryant as Anika (season 3), Belly's college roommate
- Lily Donoghue as Lacie Barone (season 3), Taylor's sorority sister
- Zoé de Grand'Maison as Agnes (season 3), Conrad's medical student friend
- Emma Ishta as Kayleigh (season 3), Adam's secretary
- Tanner Zagarino as Redbird (season 3), Jeremiah's friend and fraternity brother

== Episodes ==
=== Series overview ===
Season	Episodes	Originally released	
Season	Episodes	First released	Last released
1	7	June 17, 2022	
2	8	July 14, 2023	August 18, 2023
3	11	July 16, 2025	September 17, 2025

=== Season 1 (2022) ===
No. overall	No. in season	Title	Directed by	Teleplay by	Original release date
1	1	"Summer House"	Jesse Peretz	Jenny Han	June 17, 2022
Each summer, the Conklins—Isabel "Belly", her brother Steven, and their mother Laurel—stay in Cousins Beach with Laurel's best friend, Susannah Fisher, and her sons, Conrad and Jeremiah. Belly has had a crush on Conrad since she was ten, but thinks he sees her only as a little girl. Upon arriving, Belly and Laurel notice that Conrad is acting unusually. Belly tries to confront him about his aloofness, but is interrupted by Jeremiah and Steven, who go with Conrad to a bonfire party on the beach. At the urging of her best friend, Taylor, Belly sneaks out to go to the party as well and sees Conrad kissing Nicole, a girl he escorted to the previous year's debutante ball. After arguing with both Conrad and Steven, Belly sits alone and is approached by a boy named Cam; the two hit it off and end up kissing. Conrad gets into a drunken fight, and the police break up the party. Belly decides to accept Susannah's invitation to be a debutante.
2	2	"Summer Dress"	Jesse Peretz	Becca Gleason	June 17, 2022
Susannah and Laurel take Belly shopping for a debutante dress, but the one they buy is not to her liking. Belly attends her first debutante tea and meets her fellow debutantes, including wealthy socialite Shayla. Belly also learns that Nicole has been assigned as her mentor for the season. Cam asks Belly out on a date to a drive-in movie. At Laurel's book signing, Laurel reencounters Cleveland Castillo, a fellow author she previously offended. He tells her his next book on sailing is outside his expertise, and she recommends he ask Conrad for lessons. Bored at the bookstore, Conrad convinces Jeremiah and Steven to crash Belly's date. Belly angrily sends them away, and Cam later drives her home, where they kiss again. Steven meets with Shayla on the beach, and she asks him to be her escort to the debutante ball. Belly and Conrad argue about his interference at the drive-in; he calls her immature and vain, while she accuses him of toying with her feelings.
3	3	"Summer Nights"	Jeff Chan	Jenny Zhang	June 17, 2022
Belly celebrates her sixteenth birthday with family and friends. Everyone gives her gifts except for Conrad, who claims to have forgotten. Later, Belly and Jeremiah pick up Taylor upon her arrival in Cousins Beach. Susannah hosts a dinner, after which Belly and Taylor go to a party at Nicole's. Steven and Taylor kiss but are discovered by Belly, straining the girls' friendship. Meanwhile, Cam awaits an invite to the debutante ball. Belly finds out that Conrad had bought her a birthday gift—an infinity necklace, sentimental of something from their past—but never gave it to her. Before Taylor leaves, she and Belly reconcile.
4	4	"Summer Heat"	Jeff Chan	Speed Weed	June 17, 2022
The teens prepare for Susannah's big Fourth of July celebration. Belly and Steven's father plans to attend with his new girlfriend, while Conrad and Jeremiah learn that their father, Adam, is unable to make it. At the party, Belly drinks too many margaritas and accidentally reveals Steven's kiss with Taylor to Shayla, who then tells Steven that they are not exclusive; however, they get back together. Belly also teases Conrad about his unspoken birthday gift. Meanwhile, Laurel argues with Susannah, leaves for the bar, and has sex with Cleveland. Once sober, Belly apologizes to Conrad, and they nearly kiss, but are interrupted by Jeremiah.
5	5	"Summer Catch"	Erica Dunton	Marty Scott & Deborah Swisher	June 17, 2022
Susannah and Laurel visit a dive bar, where they reminisce about good times, and Susannah hooks up with a stranger. Laurel and Cleveland get closer. While originally elated about his near-kiss with Belly, Conrad later worries his baggage could ruin any potential relationship with her. Belly breaks up with Cam. After Conrad rejects her out of his fears, she declares she is done waiting for him. Later, while sharing a midnight swim with Jeremiah, he reveals his love for Belly, and the two kiss.
6	6	"Summer Tides"	Erica Dunton	Bayan Wolcott	June 17, 2022
At the annual beach volleyball fundraiser, Belly is determined to win. She teams up with Taylor, who fakes an injury so that Jeremiah can partner with Belly instead. However, Taylor's plan fails, and Conrad ends up playing and winning with Belly. While on a boat with Cleveland, Conrad breaks down and reveals what has been troubling him. Belly and Taylor are invited to join Nicole and her friends on Nicole's father's boat. Susannah tells Conrad to escort Belly to the debutante ball. While on the boat, Conrad texts Belly, which Nicole and the others see. In retaliation, they leave Belly and Taylor stranded in the ocean without clothes. Nicole breaks up with Conrad, returns Belly and Taylor's clothes, and tells him about the incident. Belly calls Jeremiah to pick them up, and when both boys show up, she chooses to leave with Jeremiah, and they kiss in his car. Later, Conrad contacts Belly outside and gives her the infinity necklace from her sixteenth birthday, but she rejects him, telling him it’s too late.
7	7	"Summer Love"	Erica Dunton	Jenny Han & Gabrielle Stanton	June 17, 2022
On the day of the debutante ball, preparations are underway for the night. Belly plans to attend with Jeremiah, and Susannah and Laurel manage to get her the dress she actually wanted. Steven, having lost his money in a poker game, cannot afford a tuxedo and borrows one from Shayla's father. Jeremiah begins to suspect something about his mother. When the final dance begins, he disappears after learning about Susannah's cancer from her phone. Conrad takes Jeremiah's place and dances with Belly. Afterward, he is confronted by Jeremiah about keeping Susannah's cancer a secret throughout the summer, and Belly and Steven also learn about the news. Susannah agrees to begin treatment. In the early morning hours—in the final scene of the season—Conrad and Belly kiss by the beach.

=== Season 2 (2023) ===
No. overall	No. in season	Title	Directed by	Teleplay by	Original release date
8	1	"Love Lost"	Zoe Cassavetes	Jenny Zhang	July 14, 2023
Flashbacks reveal Susannah's cancer worsening, which means her sons coming to terms with her looming death and their conflict over Belly; Conrad and Belly reconnect after originally deferring a romantic relationship in order not to hurt Jeremiah. In the present day, Belly wants to resolve the conflict as well, but when she finally talks to Jeremiah after months of silence, he tells her Conrad is missing. Valedictorian Steven seems to act strangely after his high school graduation.
9	2	"Love Scene"	Zoe Cassavetes	Jenny Han	July 14, 2023
Laurel's book about her friendship with Susannah means an important trip to New York to promote it, which she's reluctant to make. Conrad disappears after Susannah's funeral and an argument with Belly after their break up. Belly and Jeremiah search for him and try to resolve the conflict over the triangle involving them and Conrad. Flashbacks show how Conrad and Belly’s relationship deepened while they were together. The boys learn the threat to the summer home both families loved is their aunt, Julia, who has somehow become its legal owner and intends to sell. Their plan to keep the house in the family faces a disheartening obstacle.
10	3	"Love Sick"	Isabel Sandoval	Krystle Drew	July 14, 2023
The summer house is up for sale, but Belly, Jeremiah, and Conrad will leave no stone unturned to keep it in the family. While Conrad works on a secret plan, Belly and Jeremiah try a more direct route. But being back in Cousins with the Fisher brothers means Belly cannot escape painful memories of the past year—the end of her relationship with Conrad and the fallout from it are in flashbacks.
11	4	"Love Game"	Isabel Sandoval	Scarlett Curtis	July 21, 2023
Conrad runs to the beach, where he has another panic attack; Steven comes to his rescue. The next day, Aunt Julia announces she is adamant about selling the summer house and decides to proceed with the open house, despite strong opposition from Conrad. To beat the heat wave, Belly, Conrad, Jeremiah, Taylor, and their cousin Skye go to the state fair to play boardwalk games. They meet Cam and relive old memories. Meanwhile, Laurel is at her book launch, unaware of the family drama at Cousins. After a fun-filled day of games and competition, the group gets a huge shock when they return to find Susannah's beloved summer house emptied, affecting them all.
12	5	"Love Fool"	Sophia Takal	Sabrina Sherif	July 28, 2023
Jeremiah narrates this episode, which begins with the group of kids going to the country club to spend the night. They split up to find food and places to sleep. Steven and Taylor dance together in the ballroom. Jeremiah's narration reveals how jealous he was of Conrad throughout their childhood and Conrad's relationship with Belly. Conrad continues his attempts to save the beach house, inquiring with a friend who was able to use his trust to purchase a car. Eventually, the group decides to sleep on the golf course. Belly confides in Taylor that she will never love anyone the way she loved Conrad; Taylor relates that to her experience with Steven, and the two promise to leave their first loves behind.
13	6	"Love Fest"	Sophia Takal	Keith Antone & Cameron J. Ross	August 4, 2023
With the house's sale an apparent done deal, Belly convinces the group to throw a blow-out farewell party the night before it must be turned over to the new owners. Before leaving, Aunt Julia collects everyone's house keys and confesses to Skye that hard feelings from her youth made her more resolute about selling the house. During the party, disconcerting events include an unwanted intrusion from Taylor's estranged boyfriend, Steven's bold protection of and bolder confession to her, another confrontation between Conrad and Jeremiah in which Jeremiah gives his brother a jarring pronouncement, and Belly's heartache when she learns the truth behind Conrad's funeral behavior and what she really meant to him.
14	7	"Love Affair"	Megan Griffiths	Vanessa Rojas	August 11, 2023
After Belly's tearful call for help, Laurel returns from New York hurt and angry over Belly keeping her in the dark over the previous days. They have a confrontation over the funeral, resulting in Belly running away to the beach. Afterwards, Laurel apologizes to Belly, confessing her anger over Susannah's death and agreeing to help the boys keep the beach house. The kids later begin the hard cleanup following the "farewell" party. Julia at first opposes the idea of keeping the house, but when Laurel expresses empathy towards her, she admits her lack of closure with Susannah and agrees to back out of the sale. Laurel also convinces Adam to let the house stay with the two families. Adam agrees to sell the house in Boston to buy the house back from Julia. The kids help Conrad with an all-night study session to prepare for his final exams at Brown so that he can transfer to Stanford. Conrad and Belly clear the air, but Steven encourages Conrad to be honest with Belly about the feelings he still has for her. Steven goes home to pursue his relationship with Taylor. As Conrad takes the exams, Jeremiah shows Belly around his school, Finch College, which is nearby. Due to Belly's low grades, her counselor suggested she should also consider Finch. When Belly and Jeremiah return to Brown, they kiss before Conrad interrupts them.
15	8	"Love Triangle"	Megan Griffiths	Sarah Kucserka	August 18, 2023
Conrad's feelings about Belly come to a head when he, Belly, and Jeremiah are stranded in a storm and forced to share a motel room for the night. Steven convinces Laurel to attend a writer's group meeting that she fears. Taylor and Steven admit their feelings for each other and finally get together. At the motel, Jeremiah asks Conrad to be honest with Belly about his true feelings for her, so she’ll finally choose between them. While Jeremiah is sleeping, Conrad tells Belly he still wants her, but Belly says nothing. The next morning, Belly and Jeremiah kiss outside the motel. Conrad later retracts what he said the night before, stating he does not want to get between Belly and Jere, but breaks down in tears after he leaves. Belly and Jeremiah drive back to Philadelphia. Meanwhile, Conrad returns to Cousins alone to clean up the house. Belly ponders her unexpected and uncertain future with Jeremiah.

=== Season 3 (2025) ===
No. overall	No. in season	Title	Directed by	Teleplay by	Original release date
16	1	"Last Season"	Zoe Cassavetes	Robin Wasserman	July 16, 2025
Belly and Taylor enroll at Finch, joining Jeremiah. Conrad is in school in California. The story then jumps forward to Jeremiah's senior year, where he expects to graduate but can't as he doesn’t have enough credits. Belly gets the opportunity to study abroad in Paris for a semester, but hesitates due to Jere's bad news. Steven and Taylor have broken up and are in relationships with Mia and Davis, but are secretly hooking up after a chance encounter in New York. Conrad is ambivalent about returning to Cousins and reminisces to his friend Agnes about his first love. Belly overhears a girl in Taylor's sorority, Lacie, bragging about hooking up with Jeremiah in Cabo over spring break, and confronts him.
17	2	"Last Christmas"	Zoe Cassavetes	Jessica O'Toole	July 16, 2025
Belly tries making sense out of Jeremiah's betrayal, while Jeremiah anguishes over the prospect of losing her. Conrad faces a professional crisis and consequence as well, while deciding he can't be part of Susannah's memorial in Cousins, and that Jeremiah should give the dedication speech. Taylor and Steven are caught in the middle and are also having their own disagreement, which triggers a devastating consequence. Flashbacks reveal it hasn’t been years since Belly last saw Conrad—they accidentally ran into each other at Cousins last Christmas, secretly. After accepting that Jeremiah had reason to believe they were broken up and he swore never to stray again, Belly reconciles with him and accepts his marriage proposal.
18	3	"Last Supper"	Catalina Aguilar Mastretta	Leah Nanako Winkler	July 23, 2025
Steven continues recovering from the car accident while he and Taylor try to sort out their feelings for each other. Belly and Jeremiah consider waiting to announce their engagement, then agree to announce it after the dedication of Susannah's memorial garden in Cousins. Conrad still refuses to attend the ceremony until his friend Agnes convinces him to go to get closure. Laurel and John agree their night together should remain an isolated encounter. After the ceremony, Belly and Jeremiah's engagement announcement doesn't exactly go over well with either of their families.
19	4	"Last Stand"	Catalina Aguilar Mastretta	Doug Stockstill	July 30, 2025
The negative reaction to the engagement announcement spoils some of Belly's joy in turning 21, but Jeremiah does his best to remove some of the sting with a special gift. Laurel refuses to help her shop for a wedding dress. Steven tells Taylor her mom's financial situation is worse than suspected. Taylor offers to pay the debt and help Lucinda resurrect the shop. Laurel admits to John that their marriage failed because she thinks she married too young. Jeremiah's internship at Adam's firm includes having to overcome colleagues who see him as just a "nepo baby". Memories of Susannah giving her the full-size bed and her own room in the Cousins summer house bring Belly to tears, knowing both her parents reject her wedding plans and Susannah isn't there for her. When Conrad overhears her crying, he puts his departure plans on hold to support her and tells her he's going to be a best man.
20	5	"Last Dance"	Jenny Han	Jenny Han	August 6, 2025
Conrad narrates this episode, which begins with Jeremiah stuck working late at Adam's firm. This causes Conrad to reluctantly agree to help Belly begin her wedding prep. While they spend the day together, he wrestles with reminiscing about when they were a couple. Jeremiah discovers a critical financial error involving a company the firm wants to acquire, leading a proud Adam to show support for Jeremiah and Belly's wedding intentions and offer to pay for the wedding if it is held at his country club. Belly becomes discouraged at the high costs of the wedding. Coincidentally planning to attend the same conference, Steven and Denise take a train to New York together and bond over video games and their career goals. When Jeremiah finally makes it to Cousins for the weekend, he discovers Belly isn't entirely thrilled by his news about Adam. Conrad struggles to keep his remorse over losing Belly to himself, remembering a promise he made to Susannah on her deathbed to always look out for Jeremiah.
21	6	"Last Name"	Jude Weng	Siobhan Vivian	August 13, 2025
Belly Conklin faces mounting pressures as her wedding to Jeremiah Fisher approaches. While staying with Adam, who's already sick of her living there, Belly feels increasingly out of place and overwhelmed by the lavish wedding plans. Afterwards, she and Jeremiah look for apartments together, but their search is hindered by Jeremiah's credit card debt. Back in Cousins, Belly tours the country club and is overwhelmed at how much bigger the wedding has become. Conrad, knowing how hard it is for her to plan the wedding alone, secretly meets with Laurel and convinces her to come. At the bridal shower, Belly realizes she'd incorrectly answered a trivia question about Jeremiah's first dog, Rosie, mistaking Jeremiah for Conrad, which seems to really throw her. The following day at the beach house, Conrad cuts his leg while surfing. After Belly dresses the wound and comforts him, she gives in to her feelings and almost kisses him before he walks away, leaving her shaken.
22	7	"Last Hurrah"	Katina Medina Mora	Sarah Choi	August 20, 2025
There is some tension between Belly and Conrad while they clean the beach house together in preparation for everyone's arrival. Laurel is surprised and upset to learn that Adam brought Kayleigh to Cousins Beach for the wedding. Taylor agrees to be Steven's wingman when he shows up at Cousins with Denise, and follows through by nudging Denise to make a move. Belly and Jeremiah celebrate their bachelor/bachelorette night with their friends, where Belly confirms that it was Conrad who helped convince her mom to be a part of the wedding, and Conrad learns about Jeremiah's spring break incident. All of this culminates in Conrad confessing to Belly how he feels about her on the beach and confronting her about defending Jere's infidelity. Belly rebuffs him, insisting that there's nothing between her and Conrad anymore. Once alone, she breaks down and cries.
23	8	"Last Kiss"	Katina Medina Mora	Sarah Kucserka	August 27, 2025
At their wedding rehearsal dinner, Belly and Jeremiah experience conflict when he shares that he accepted a job offer from his father without discussing it with her first. While originally apologizing for overstepping the night before, Conrad confirms to Belly he meant what he said on the beach, and accuses her of knowing all summer that he still loved her. Taylor confronts Conrad about what he said to Belly, asking him to back off. The night before the wedding, Steven and Denise kiss, but both agree to be friends. Belly tells Jeremiah about Conrad confessing to her. The next morning, Jeremiah is missing, and Belly receives a letter from Susannah for her wedding day, which Laurel gives her. After being found by Conrad in Susannah's memorial garden, Jeremiah punches him and disowns him as his brother. Conrad learns that the letter Susannah wrote for Jeremiah was actually addressed to him; the envelopes had been accidentally swapped. Taylor questions Belly on whether she's marrying Jeremiah for the right reasons. Just before the wedding starts, Conrad visits Belly and apologizes for everything, before telling her their time together was worth it to him and promising to leave her and Jeremiah alone. Jeremiah then confronts Belly about her feelings for Conrad, revealing he knows about their Christmas together and forcing her to admit she still loves Conrad. The wedding is called off, and Belly spontaneously decides to go to Paris, seeing Conrad at the airport before she boards her flight.
24	9	"Last Call"	Jesse Peretz	Sinead Daly	September 3, 2025
Belly chooses not to approach Conrad at the airport and boards her flight to Paris. Conrad learns that the wedding was called off and returns to Cousins for Jeremiah, but is told to stay away from Jere by Steven and Taylor. Jere drowns his sorrows and waits for Belly to call, and Steven and Taylor finally admit to still having feelings for each other and decide to give their relationship another shot. In Paris, Belly is informed that there is no room for her in the exchange program, and she is devastated. At a cafe, Belly's backpack gets stolen, containing her passport and engagement ring. While tracking it down, she encounters and befriends a group of Parisians who encourage her to stay back in the city. Belly calls Jere, who is angry to learn that she is not returning. A confrontation between the brothers leads to Conrad going back to California.
25	10	"Last Year"	Jesse Peretz	Jenny Zhang	September 10, 2025
Belly chooses to stay in Paris, taking two jobs to support herself while continuing her college classes online. Taylor and Steven move in together and host a combined Thanksgiving dinner with Jeremiah. After finding out that Jeremiah has lied about going back to college, Adam cuts him off financially, and Denise agrees to let Jeremiah temporarily live with her. Belly decides not to go home for Christmas, and Conrad begins to send her written letters. Steven quits his job to work full-time on his startup with Denise. Jeremiah is invited to Christmas dinner by Laurel, but he finds himself unable to enter the beach house and leaves after Laurel comforts him. Taylor visits Belly in Paris for New Year's and discovers that Conrad has been writing to Belly, but Belly reassures her that she is not writing back. Belly and Benito share a New Year's Eve kiss and begin casually dating. After a friend offers her their apartment, Belly chooses to remain in Paris for another year. On the fifth anniversary of Susannah's death, Conrad and Jeremiah accidentally run into each other at their mom's grave. After an argument, the two reconcile, and Jeremiah tells Conrad he should pursue Belly. Belly finally answers Conrad's letters. Encouraged by Agnes, Conrad buys a plane ticket to visit Paris.
26	11	"At Last"	Jesse Peretz	Jenny Han & Sarah Kucserka	September 17, 2025
Conrad visits Paris on his way to a conference in Brussels to meet Belly for her 22nd birthday. Despite an awkward initial meeting, they spend the day together as Belly shows Conrad around Paris, and then she invites Conrad to a birthday dinner with her friends. They talk through their past and spend a romantic and intimate night together, but Belly, still feeling guilty about Susannah's death and insecure about Conrad's reasons for loving her, tries to distance herself the next morning. Conrad insists his love is real, not just tied to grief, and leaves for the train to Brussels. Realizing she truly loves him and deserves happiness, Belly chases after him. She declares her love for him on the already-departing train, and they reunite with a kiss. Meanwhile, Jeremiah begins to move on with his culinary career and shares a kiss with Denise; Steven and Taylor decide on a future together in San Francisco for Steven's career development, while the parents settle into new dynamics. Some time later, Belly and Conrad return to Cousins and visit the beach house. The closing credits are accompanied by pictures of Belly and Conrad spending Christmas together in Paris.

== Production ==
=== Development ===
On February 8, 2021, Amazon gave the production a series order consisting of eight episodes. The series is based on the 2009 novel of the same name by Jenny Han. It is created by Han who also serves as the showrunner and an executive producer. Also executive producing are Gabrielle Stanton, Karen Rosenfelt, Nne Ebong, and Hope Hartman. Stanton is also a co-showrunner for the first season. On June 8, 2022, ahead of the series premiere, Amazon renewed the series for a second season, with Han and Sarah Kucserka as co-showrunners. On August 3, 2023, ahead of the second-season finale, the series was renewed for a third season, with Han and Kucserka returning as showrunners. On September 17, 2025, the day the series finale released, a feature film was greenlit to conclude the story on Amazon Prime Video, with Han serving as the writer alongside Kucserka. Han is also set to direct the film.

=== Casting ===
L–R: Gavin Casalegno as Jeremiah Fisher, Lola Tung as Isabel "Belly" Conklin, and Christopher Briney as Conrad Fisher

On April 28, 2021, Lola Tung, Rachel Blanchard, Jackie Chung, and Christopher Briney were cast as series regulars. Han stated that choosing Briney to play Conrad was the easiest casting choice out of all the characters. In July 2021, Gavin Casalegno, Sean Kaufman, Minnie Mills, and Alfredo Narciso joined the main cast, while Summer Madison, David Iacono, Rain Spencer, and Tom Everett Scott joined the cast in recurring roles. On August 31, 2022, Kyra Sedgwick and Elsie Fisher were cast in recurring capacities for the second season. On April 20, 2023, Mills announced that she had exited the series ahead of the second season. On June 4, 2025, it was reported that Isabella Briggs and Kristen Connolly were cast as new series regulars while Sofia Bryant, Lily Donoghue, Zoé de Grand'Maison, Emma Ishta, and Tanner Zagarino in recurring capacities for the third season.

=== Filming ===
Principal photography for the first season took place in 2021 in Wilmington, North Carolina, locations included Carolina Beach, Fort Fisher, and Wave Transit's Padgett Station on N. 3rd Street. Filming of the second season began in July 2022 and concluded in November 2022.

Cast members have confirmed that filming for the third season was initially set to begin in 2023. However, it ended up being delayed due to the Writers Guild and SAG-AFTRA strikes which happened from May to November 2023. In late January 2024, it was confirmed that the third season had entered into pre-production in the Wilmington area, eyeing a spring start date. On May 14, 2024, it was announced that the third season had begun filming.

== Music ==
=== Score and soundtrack ===
The series features an original score by composer Zachary Dawes, released digitally as an Amazon Original album for season 1 on July 1, 2022. Critics have noted that beyond the score, the show leans heavily on prominent pop "needle drops" to underscore pivotal character beats and seasonal time-jumps.

=== Use of Taylor Swift's music ===
Taylor Swift's repertoire has been a recurring presence across seasons. Swift's re-recording of "This Love (Taylor's Version)" debuted in the first teaser trailer in May 2022; the full track was released as a digital single shortly thereafter. Season 1 included placements such as "Lover," "The Way I Loved You (Taylor's Version)" and "False God," used at key turning points including the debutante-ball finale. For season 2, trailers and episodes featured "Back to December (Taylor's Version)," "august," and in-episode uses including "Last Kiss (Taylor's Version)," "Invisible String," "Sweet Nothing" and "Exile." The final-season campaign continued this approach: the first full trailer was set to "Daylight" and "Red (Taylor's Version)".

Showrunner Jenny Han has described actively pursuing Swift's catalog for specific scenes, including writing the singer a handwritten note to help secure permissions; People magazine summarized how the approach yielded multiple Swift cues across seasons.

=== Reception and impact ===
Several outlets have identified the music supervision as integral to the show's tone and storytelling, with Vulture arguing that Swift's songs often function "as if Swift herself is a character on the show." Writing on the series' broader cultural traction, The Guardian likewise noted the "Taylor Swift–heavy soundtrack" as a driver of the show's cross-generational appeal and weekly social-media conversation.

== Release ==
The series premiered on Prime Video on June 17, 2022. The first three episodes of the second season premiered on July 14, 2023, with the remaining five episodes released weekly until the finale on August 18, 2023. Before the release of the third and final season, Prime Video uploaded the first and second seasons of the show for free on YouTube. The 11-episode third and final season premiered on July 16, 2025, with two new episodes, and followed by a new episode on a weekly basis until the series finale on September 17, 2025.

== Reception ==
=== Critical response ===
==== Season 1 ====
For the first season, the review aggregator website Rotten Tomatoes reported an 86% approval rating with an average rating of 7.1/10, based on 28 critic reviews. The website's critics consensus reads, "The Summer I Turned Pretty doesn't need more time to become a swan, coming out of the gate a solidly charming and sweet rom-com with appeal across generations." Metacritic, which uses a weighted average, assigned a score of 73 out of 100 based on seven critics, indicating "generally favorable reviews".

Angie Han of The Hollywood Reporter wrote, "As a coming-of-age story, Amazon's The Summer I Turned Pretty is a cut above. Tenderly written and endearingly acted, it's sensitive to the subtle but irreversible shifts in self-perception that come with late adolescence—and at the same time clear-eyed enough to understand that teenagers, up to and including its own blushing heroine, sure can act like clueless jerks while they're figuring out how to wield their newfound powers." Delia Cai of Vanity Fair also gave a positive review, commenting that "the specificity of Laurel's fantasy summer is ultimately what rescues The Summer I Turned Pretty from being too sticky sweet."

Writing for The Playlist, Marya E. Gates wrote, "Although the voiceover in which [Belly] shares [her] feelings is unevenly deployed, it's refreshing to see a story that puts the girl in the driver's seat and gives her the room to work through the contradictions of adolescence and sexual coming-of-age on her own terms." Joyce Slaton of Common Sense Media said the series is "as sweet, light, and refreshing as a soda on ice by the swimming pool...[and] tackles the confusion and loveliness of an awkward coming-of-age."

Abby Cavenaugh of Collider noted "though at some points, the love triangle—or quadrangle, with Cam included—can feel a bit forced, overall this story works on many levels. You grow to really care about these characters and want to see them happy," adding "Belly is the star of the show, and Tung sells every moment of it with her luminous performance."

==== Season 2 ====
The second season holds an approval rating of 60% on Rotten Tomatoes, based on 15 critic reviews, with an average rating of 6.5/10. On Metacritic, the second season received a score of 71 based on reviews from six critics, indicating "generally favorable" reviews.

Some critics welcomed the series' tackling of the heavier themes of grief and loss. Lauren Chval of The A.V. Club said that season 2 raises the stakes of the central love triangle and makes a strong case for a Jeremiah relationship with Belly. Tung's performance received continued praise, with Kayleigh Donaldson of TheWrap writing that "the season is at its best when it focuses on Belly, giving space to her emotional strife and the oft-derided difficulties of being a teenage girl in a world where you're positioned as something between a sex object and a punching bag." The soundtrack also received praise.

Others felt the second season lacks the breeziness and fun of the first season. Though critics noted the narrative stays faithful to the book, some said the integration of flashback scenes was at times confusing and that important storylines were being skipped. Writing for Collider, Therese Lacson gave an overall positive review but noted that the season's addition of new characters meant less time to develop their arcs and the meat of their stories. Nicole Gallucci of Decider wrote season 2's "emotional roller coaster serves as a harsh reminder that life isn't always a beach, but its unique mix of 'miserable and magical' will keep you hooked until the end."

==== Season 3 ====
The third season has an approval rating of 92% on Rotten Tomatoes, based on 12 critic reviews.

=== Impact ===
After the series' debut, all three The Summer I Turned Pretty books entered the top three spots on the Amazon Best Sellers list, with the second book, It's Not Summer Without You, reaching number one. The artists whose music is used in the show have also seen an increase in streams, sales, and followers, with some experiencing up to a 6,000% increase in song sales. Taylor Swift's seventh studio album, Lover, resurged in sales and streaming, and re-entered the top 40 region of the Billboard 200 chart as well, after three of its songs—"Cruel Summer", "Lover" and "False God"—were featured in the series. Beyoncé's 2014 single "XO" tripled in sales units following its use in the finale. The series also had a significant social media reach, with the hashtag #TheSummerITurnedPretty accumulating over 13.8 billion views on TikTok. It generated over 107,000 global posts over launch weekend and 725 million potential impressions across platforms, according to social analytics agency DMS.

=== Audience viewership ===
In September 2023, Vernon Sanders, an Amazon Prime executive, revealed that season 2 of Jenny Han's YA adaptation was the streamer's No. 2 most-viewed series to date among women 18–34, behind only Rings of Power, according to Prime Video. It was also the most-completed series to-date among that demographic. The series had also driven subscription growth that summer, Amazon reported. The Summer I Turned Pretty was among Prime Video's Top 3 series in terms of global acquisition (and, again, No. 1 with women 18–34).

On July 28, 2025, it reported that the third and final season drew 25 million viewers globally within its first seven days of the season premiere. It reached 70 million viewers 70 days after the season premiered, 7 days after the finale, which marked a 65% increase from the 70-day total achieved by Season 2. Throughout its run, the final season was Amazon's most-watched title globally and became the No. 1 title in more than 140 countries.

According to Media Play News, citing U.S. streaming data from research firm PlumResearch, The Summer I Turned Pretty was the most-viewed title across major streaming platforms in August 2023, attracting around 16 million unique viewers and nearly 70 million total episode views on Prime Video during the month.

=== Awards and nominations ===
Awards	Year	Category	Result
Artios Awards	2024	Television Series – Drama	Nominated
Artios Awards	2025	Television Series – Drama	Nominated
People's Choice Awards	2024	Bingeworthy Show of the Year	Won
