= The Summer I Turned Pretty (trilogy) =

Novel trilogy by Jenny Han

- The Summer I Turned Pretty Trilogy, omnibus edition (Simon & Schuster, 2011)
- The Summer I Turned Pretty (2009); It's Not Summer Without You (2010); We'll Always Have Summer (2011)
- Author: Jenny Han
- Country: United States
- Language: English
- Publisher: Simon & Schuster
- Published: 2009–2011
- Media type: Print (hardback, paperback)
- No. of books: 3

The Summer I Turned Pretty is a trilogy of young adult romance novels written by Asian-American author Jenny Han and published by Simon & Schuster. The series includes The Summer I Turned Pretty (2009), It's Not Summer Without You (2010), and We'll Always Have Summer (2011).

The novels follow Isabel "Belly" Conklin in the summers she spends at Cousins Beach with her mother, her best friend (Taylor), and older brother (Steven), along with her mother's lifelong best friend and her sons. The books in the series were national best sellers; the final installment spent more than a month on The New York Times Best Seller list.

A television series based on the novels of the trilogy premiered on Amazon Prime Video on June 17, 2022. A movie based on the novels is currently in the works.

== Books in the series ==
1. The Summer I Turned Pretty (2009)
2. It's Not Summer Without You (2010)
3. We’ll Always Have Summer (2011)

== Characters ==
Isabel "Belly" Conklin
The narrator, and protagonist of the series. She is the daughter of Laurel and the younger sister of Steven. She is known to have had a crush on her friend Conrad since she was young, but her relationship with him falls apart at the end of It's Not Summer Without You after the two become a couple for a short time. She then starts a relationship with his brother, Jeremiah, after he kisses her, making his feelings known to her. In We'll Always Have Summer, which chronicles their two-year relationship, Belly discovers at a frat party that Jeremiah cheated on her with a sorority girl. She slaps him across the face and spends days in bed, crying. To prove his regret, Jeremiah proposes to her, which she hesitantly accepts; however, a result of ongoing fights with her mother (who is furious with her for choosing to marry so young), she stays at Cousins Beach. Because of this arrangement, her old feelings for Conrad, who is staying there as well, begin to slowly resurface. Conrad confesses his love for her. Although Belly blows up at his confession, saying he was too late, her feelings for both brothers are called into question. She and Jeremiah, in the end, call off their engagement and break up for good after realizing they are not meant to be. In the epilogue, Belly has not heard from Conrad for two years, before receiving her handwritten letters from him "each and every month" throughout the rest of her college years. Eventually, she begins to stay in contact with him. Conrad shows up at her college graduation, resulting in them getting back together as a couple. He proposes to Belly a little over a year later.
Conrad "Con", “Connie” Fisher
The eldest son of Susannah and Adam Fisher, and older brother of Jeremiah. He is known to push away his loved ones and to keep all his emotions and feelings inside. In the first book, his character is something of a jerk, having spent the summer at the beach getting drunk or locked in his room. It is suspected, though, that he has developed feelings for Belly; he is shown several times as either overly protective or jealous of boys flirting with her. At the end of the novel, he and Belly become a couple. However, the relationship is short-lived when Conrad once again slips back into his emotional old ways. At the beginning of the second novel, he runs away from college to protect the beach house once he finds out his father intends to sell it. In the end, Laurel shows up and makes a deal with Mr. Fisher that Conrad and Jeremiah can personally keep the house if Conrad returns to college and passes all his exams. The adults leave and Belly and Jeremiah help prepare Conrad for his exams. Things seem to go well, but take an abrupt turn for the worse when Conrad walks in on Belly and Jeremiah kissing. Conrad, however, tells his brother he is over Belly and it is okay if the two get together. In We'll Always Have Summer, which takes place two years later, it is revealed that Conrad lied when saying he was over Belly and has always been in love with her. He spends time throughout the novel fighting his true feelings and pretending he does not care for her. However, once he discovers at Jeremiah's bachelor party how he cheated on Belly, Conrad becomes furious and leaves. When Belly later comes across him, Conrad confesses his long-hidden love for her before begging her not to marry his brother and to be with him, breaking down into tears. Belly turns him down, claiming he is too late, breaking his heart. The next day, Conrad apologizes to Belly because he was "too drunk" during his confession, but Belly knows he is lying. After Jeremiah finds out about his brother's feelings for Belly, he goes missing on his wedding day. Conrad finds him at their mother's garden. They fight and Jeremiah soon disowns him as his brother, saying that he is "dead" to him. Conrad bids Belly goodbye, and gives her back his infinity necklace, saying it "always" belonged to her and "always will". In the epilogue, Conrad has not contacted Belly for two years before sending her his first handwritten letter, which then come "each and every month" through the rest of her college years. He then shows up at her college graduation, and they get back together. This all leads up to his marriage proposal two years into their relationship. The series ends with Belly marrying Conrad, and the couple starting a new life together.
Jeremiah "Jere" Fisher
At the outset of the series, he is the "golden" boy, the one who appears to be untainted in the eyes of everyone. He is a good friend to Belly and a loving brother to Conrad. He steps aside as Conrad pursues Belly, even when he came to realize his own feelings for her. In It's Not Summer Without You, he grows tired of burying his feelings for Belly and abruptly kisses her while sitting in a car with her; she kisses back, only for Conrad to discover them. Despite being near furious of what he caught the two doing, Conrad gives Jeremiah permission to have his chance with Belly. In We'll Always Have Summer, his character changes drastically from golden boy to frat boy, even cheating on Belly with the "sister sorority slut". He proposes to Belly to prove his remorse. However, when he discovers that Conrad confessed his feelings for her, he takes off the night before the wedding and fails to show up on the day. Conrad finds him and confronts him about who loves and deserves Belly more. After reading a letter for "him" from their mom, and discovering it was actually meant for Conrad, Jeremiah disowns Conrad as his brother. In the epilogue, he is seen at Conrad and Belly's wedding and brings a new girl along.
Susannah "Beck" Fisher
The rock that everyone seems to cling to. Even in death, her calming force is referenced and used by all as they navigate the different situations in their lives. She dies of cancer between books one and two, but is heavily remembered by her family and friends throughout the course of the series. It is revealed that she left letters to "the summer kids" in the final book (although we only get to read the one she gave to Belly). She is shown to be very friendly, loving and compassionate. Her death hits everyone hard and life without her seems near impossible; it takes everyone almost a year to pull themselves together and form a life without her existence.
Mr. Fisher
A man who is known to have his way no matter what it costs or who it hurts. He is Susannah's husband and the father of Conrad and Jeremiah. After Susannah dies, he turns to whiskey. He drives Conrad away after Conrad saw how badly he began treating Susannah, such as cheating on her and running away when she got cancer. He tries to sell the summer house in It's Not Summer Without You following Susannah's death, and is barely stopped in time by Laurel and Conrad. In the final book, he tries to mend his relationship with his sons and pays for Jeremiah and Belly's wedding, despite not agreeing with them getting married at such a young age.
Taylor Jewel
Belly's best friend despite being her polar opposite. Unlike Belly, she is boy crazy and appears shallow, though by We'll Always Have Summer, she seems to have matured. In the first book of the series, as seen in flashbacks, she goes for all three boys (Steven, Conrad and Jeremiah) almost at once, determined to hook up with one of them. She is seen desperately trying to pair Belly with boys, even though her friend endlessly protests. She and Belly have a falling out towards the climax of It's Not Summer Without You after Taylor accuses Belly of being "a crappy friend" when Belly does not want her to come to a party at the beach house. By We'll Always Have Summer, they make peace, and Taylor can be seen throughout the course of the book supporting and helping Belly with her wedding. She confronts Conrad after suspecting he said something to Belly to upset her and warns him to leave her alone. Although she admits that Belly told her a part of her will always love Conrad, and knows he loves Belly too, she asks him to "be the good guy Belly says he is" by letting her go.
Laurel Dunne
Belly and Steven's mother as well as Susannah's best friend. She is rigid and desperate to have the relationship with Belly that her daughter had with Susannah. She seems to always make the wrong choices as far as Belly is concerned, but her desire to be close to her daughter is prevalent and admirable. The two women come head to head in We'll Always Have Summer when Belly and Jeremiah announce their engagement. Laurel is furious, saying the couple are far too young for such a commitment, even going as far as refusing to show up for the wedding, which leaves Belly devastated. After seeing her upset one night at Cousins Beach, Conrad talks to her and manages to convince her to make amends with Belly. It is shown in the final book that the relationship between Conrad and Laurel is very close and even resembles the relationship between Conrad and Susannah. In the epilogue of We'll Always Have Summer, it is implied that she helped Belly pick out her wedding dress for Belly's wedding to Conrad, and helped plan the ceremony.
Steven Conklin
Belly's older brother, a good friend and supportive brother. Though we see little of him, his truthfulness is a springboard for Belly to make difficult but wise decisions. He appears throughout Belly's flashbacks, making fun of her and teasing her endlessly, but despite such teasing, he is shown to have a protective side. He even says to Belly herself in We'll Always Have Summer that while Jeremiah was like a brother to him, Belly was his "little sister and [she] came first", something that surprises her.
Cam
He only appears in The Summer I Turned Pretty as a summer fling of Belly's. It is said that he had a crush on Belly throughout grade school but never had the courage to approach her. He leaves one final voicemail for Belly, asking if she wanted to stay in contact after the summer, but if not, "it was nice hanging out with her". He is mentioned twice more in the series, as one of Belly's summer memories.

== Adaptation ==
=== Television series ===
In 2013, Lions Gate Entertainment announced that it had secured the rights to turn the trilogy into a television series. On February 8, 2021, Amazon ordered eight episodes of a series created by Han and Gabrielle Stanton and executive-produced by them and by Karen Rosenfelt, Paul Lee, Nne Ebong, and Hope Hartman. The seven-episode series was filmed in Wilmington, North Carolina; and premiered on June 17, 2022. Season 2 premiered on July 14, 2023, marking a highly anticipated continuation of the series. Season 3, the show's final season, premiered on July 16, 2025.

=== Film ===
On September 17, 2025, the day the series finale of the television series adaptation of The Summer I Turned Pretty released, a feature film was greenlit to conclude the story on Amazon Prime Video, with Jenny Han herself serving as the writer alongside Kucserka. Han is also set to direct the film.
