= List of Justin Chatwin performances =

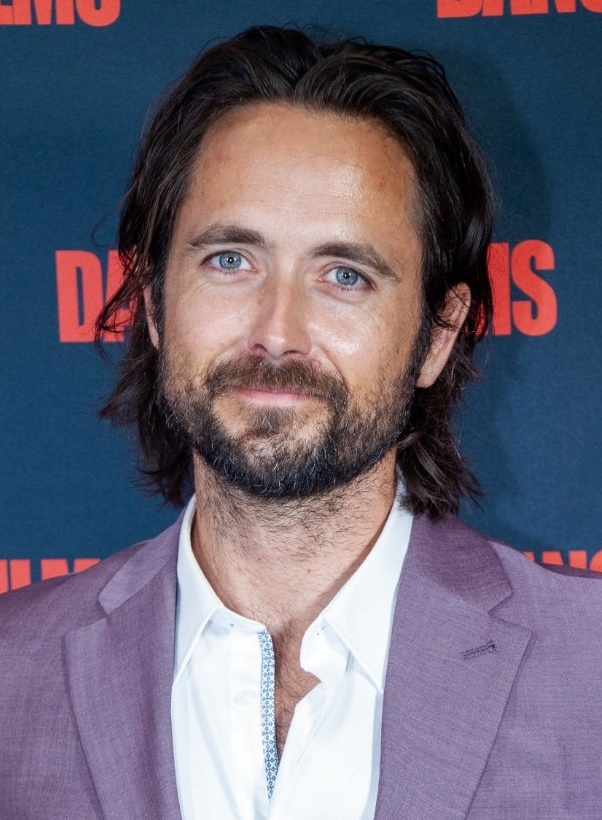
Chatwin at the 2022 Dances With Films

Justin Chatwin is a Canadian actor of film and television. After making his film debut in the musical comedy Josie and the Pussycats (2001), Chatwin guest-starred in several television series and had minor appearances in two unsuccessful films, Taking Lives and Superbabies: Baby Geniuses 2 (both 2004). That same year, Newsweek magazine singled him out as an "Actor to watch" based on his work in the three-part miniseries Traffic.

Chatwin had his breakthrough performance as Tom Cruise's rebellious son in the blockbuster War of the Worlds (2005), directed by Steven Spielberg. He followed that up by portraying a teenage drug dealer in The Chumscrubber, a black comedy which premiered at the Sundance Film Festival. Chatwin later headlined the 2007 supernatural thriller The Invisible, and starred as Goku in Dragonball Evolution (2009), an action-adventure film directed by James Wong based on the Japanese manga Dragon Ball.

Throughout the 2010s, Chatwin has found more success on television, starring as a lovesick car thief on the Showtime dramedy Shameless between 2011 and 2015. After a recurring role in the third season of BBC's Orphan Black, Chatwin played a cartoonist in the CBS murder mystery drama American Gothic (2016). That same year, he portrayed superhero Grant Gordon / The Ghost in "The Return of Doctor Mysterio", the 2016 Christmas Special of the science fiction series Doctor Who. Chatwin has also starred as scientist Erik Wallace in the two season Netflix series Another Life.

Simultaneously, Chatwin worked on a number of independent films, playing a diverse spectrum of characters in a variety of genres. He portrayed an Italian dancer in Daniel Roby's disco drama Funkytown (2011), a rock star in Jeffrey St. Jules' sci-fi musical Bang Bang Baby (2014), which earned him a Canadian Screen Awards nomination for Best Supporting Actor, a cat-turned-human in Finn Taylor's romantic comedy Unleashed (2016), a modern-day cowboy in Blake Robbins' western The Scent of Rain and Lightning (2017), a rookie detective in the crime thriller The Assassin's Code (2018), and a free-spirited bartender in the coming-of-age dramedy Summer Night (2019) directed by Joseph Cross.

Chatwin's long-time passion for extreme sports, travelling and motorcycles, led to the documentary series No Good Reason (2020), which follows his journey from Vancouver to Patagonia on motorcycle.

== Film ==
Key
†	Denotes films that have not yet been released

Year	Title	Role	Notes	Ref(s)
2001	Josie and the Pussycats	Teenage Fan		
2004	Superbabies: Baby Geniuses 2	Zack		
2004	Taking Lives	Matt Soulsby		
2005	War of the Worlds	Robbie Ferrier		
2005	The Chumscrubber	Billy Peck		
2007	The Invisible	Nick Powell		
2008	Middle of Nowhere	Ben Pretzler		
2009	Dragonball Evolution	Son Goku		
2011	Brink	Jeremy	Short film	
2011	Funkytown	Santo "Tino" DeiFiori		
2014	Bang Bang Baby	Bobby Shore	Nominated - Canadian Screen Award for Best Actor in a Supporting Role	
2015	The Cycle	The Man	Short film	
2015	No Stranger Than Love	Rydell Whyte		
2016	Poor Boy	Jackie Clean		
2016	Urge	Jason		
2016	Unleashed	Diego / Ajax		
2016	1 Night	Andrew "Drew" McFarland	aka One Night	
2017	CHiPs	Raymond Reed Kurtz Jr.		
2017	The Scent of Rain and Lightning	Hugh Jay Linder		
2017	We Don't Belong Here	Tomas	aka The Greens Are Gone	
2018	In the Cloud	Halid "Hale" Begovic		
2018	The Assassin's Code	Michael Connelly	aka Legacy	
2019	Summer Night	Andy		
2021	Die in a Gunfight	Terrence Uberahl		
2022	The Walk	Bill Coughlin		
2024	Reagan	Jack Reagan		
2025	Sweetness	Ron Hill		
2025	The Long Shot	Dylan Hench		
2025	The Roaring Game	Troy Samson	Also associate producer	
2025	The Panic	Herbert Satterlee		
2026	Sleepwalker	Michael Anders	Also executive producer	
TBA	Salt & Honey †	Garland Riggs	Post-production	
TBA	Both Sides Now †	Diamond	Filming	

== Television ==
Year	Title	Role	Notes	Ref(s)
2001	Christy, Choices of the Heart	John Spencer	2 episodes	
2001	Smallville	Teen Jostled by Whitney	Episode: "Pilot"	
2001	Mysterious Ways	J.T Stanislaw	Episode: "Doctor in the House"	
2002	Just Cause	Shaun Martin	Episode: "Code of Silence"	
2002	Night Visions	Pete Hartford	Episode: "The Maze/Harmony"	
2002	Beyond Belief: Fact or Fiction	Vinny Rose	Episode: "The News Stand"	
2002	Glory Days	Barry Bowers	Episode: "Grim Ferrytale"	
2002	Taken	Clauson	2 episodes	
2003	The Incredible Mrs. Ritchie	Lawrence	TV film	
2004	Prodigy	Dempsey	TV pilot	
2004	Traffic	Tyler McKay	3 episodes	
2005–2012	Weeds	Josh Wilson	3 episodes	
2006	Lost	Edward F. "Eddie" Colburn	Episode: "Further Instructions"	
2011–2015	Shameless	Jimmy Lishman / Steve Wilton	Main role (seasons 1–3); Guest (season 4); Recurring role (season 5); 40 episodes	
2013	The Listener	Rudy Best	Episode: "Blast from the Past"	
2015	Breed	Cooper Wells	TV pilot	
2015	Orphan Black	Jason Kellerman	4 episodes	
2016	American Gothic	Cameron Hawthorne	13 episodes	
2016	Doctor Who	Grant Gordon / The Ghost	Episode: "The Return of Doctor Mysterio"	
2017	The Doomsday Project	Chris Wyatt	TV pilot	
2019–2021	Another Life	Erik Wallace	19 episodes	
2025	Law & Order	Thomas Price	Episode: "The Hardest Thing"	

== Theatre ==
Year	Title	Role	Venue	Ref(s)
2006	Dark Matters	Jeremy Cleary	Rattlestick Playwrights Theater	
2007	The Mistakes Madeline Made	Wilson	Dairy Arts Center	
2009	Red Light Winter	Davis	Dairy Arts Center	

== Documentaries ==
Year	Title	Role	Notes	Ref(s)
2013	Isolated	Himself	Documentary film	
2016	Behind the Storm: The Making of the Scent of Rain and Lightning	Himself	Short documentary film	
2020	No Good Reason	Himself	7 episodes; also executive producer	

== Music videos ==
Year	Title	Artist	Role	Ref(s)
2011	"Learn to Run"	David Vertesi	The Boyfriend	
2016	"Doin' Wrong with You"	Brad Carter	Hugh Jay Linder	
2019	"Slow Motion"	Hayley Taylor	Love Interest	

== Podcasts ==
Year	Title	Role	Notes	Ref(s)
2015	The Black List Table Reads	Norman Hawkins	Episode: "Celeritas"	
2024	Status: Untraced	Himself	Episode: "1.3: The Legend You Live"	
