= Justin Chatwin =

Canadian actor (born 1982)

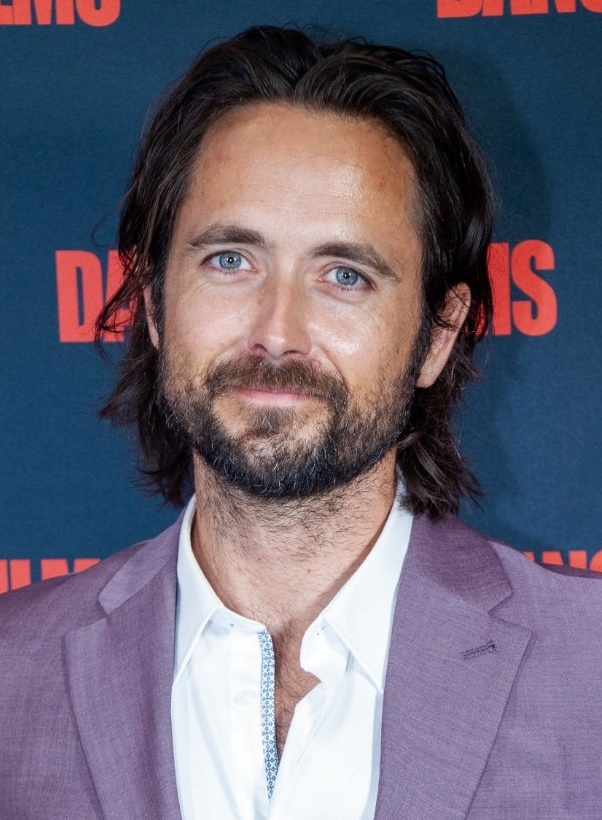
- Chatwin at the 2022 Dances With Films
- Born: October 31, 1982 (age 44); Nanaimo, British Columbia, Canada
- Occupation: Actor
- Years active: 2001–present

Justin Chatwin (born October 31, 1982) is a Canadian actor. He began his career briefly appearing in the musical comedy Josie and the Pussycats (2001). Following his breakthrough role as Robbie Ferrier in the blockbuster War of the Worlds (2005), Chatwin headlined studio films such as The Invisible (2007) and Dragonball Evolution (2009), an action-adventure feature based on the manga series Dragon Ball. In the 2010s, Chatwin acted in small independent films. He starred as rock star idol Bobby Shore in the sci-fi musical Bang Bang Baby (2014), which earned him a Canadian Screen Awards nomination for Best Supporting Actor, and appeared in the romantic comedy Unleashed (2016), and drama Summer Night (2019).

Throughout the 2000s, Chatwin made guest appearances in several television series including Weeds and Lost. His first regular role was on the Showtime comedy-drama Shameless, where he portrayed Jimmy Lishman between 2011 and 2015. Chatwin starred as a cartoonist in the CBS murder mystery drama American Gothic (2016), and also that year he appeared as superhero Grant Gordon / The Ghost in the Doctor Who Christmas special "The Return of Doctor Mysterio". From 2019 to 2021, Chatwin played scientist Erik Wallace in Netflix's Another Life.

Aside from acting, he has a long-time passion for motorcycles, extreme sports and travelling. Chatwin's journey from Vancouver to Patagonia on motorcycle was depicted in the documentary series No Good Reason (2020), which he also executive produced.

== Early life ==
Chatwin was born in Nanaimo, British Columbia. He is the son of Suzanne (née Halsall), a freelance mixed-media artist, and Brian, an engineer who founded in 1982 Chatwin Engineering, a construction and civil engineering company based in British Columbia, where he served as president and CEO. Chatwin's parents divorced in 2010. His late grandfather was of French-Canadian ancestry. Chatwin has a younger sister, Brianna, who works as a tattoo artist. They were raised Catholic.

After graduating from high school, Chatwin followed in his father's footsteps and began to study engineering at the University of British Columbia, but after one week he switched to commerce. A few weeks later, Chatwin was dared by a friend to audition for a TV show that was shooting in Vancouver: "I took the dare, not knowing what I was getting into. I was called back and hired..." Chatwin eventually dropped out of university after one semester in order to pursue his acting career full time.

In the early 2000s, Chatwin moved to Los Angeles, where he rented an apartment with fellow actor Noel Fisher. Prior to this he was homeless for a while and lived in a travel trailer with actor Shaun Sipos, stating, "We didn't have girlfriends; we were reading Kerouac and Ginsberg, driving up to the desert, walking in the dunes, and showering at 24 Hour Fitness. It was an exciting time, but would I do it again? No."

== Career ==
=== 2001–2004: Early work ===
Chatwin made his debut in the musical comedy Josie and the Pussycats (2001), in which he played an enthusiastic fan. The film, based on the Archie Comics series and the Hanna-Barbera cartoon of the same name, was a commercial failure upon its initial release, but has enjoyed later success as a cult film.

Soon after, Chatwin starred as John Spencer in the two-part miniseries Christy, Choices of the Heart. He went on to guest-star in several television series including Smallville, Mysterious Ways, Night Visions, Just Cause, Glory Days, Beyond Belief: Fact or Fiction and Taken, playing also a juvenile delinquent in the television film The Incredible Mrs. Ritchie (2003), directed by Paul Johansson. One year later, Chatwin played an aspiring guitarist murdered by a serial killer who takes on the identities of his victims in D. J. Caruso's psychological thriller Taking Lives, based on the novel of the same name by Michael Pye. He was also a helper and friend of the title characters in the family-oriented comedy Superbabies: Baby Geniuses 2, a sequel to the 1999 film Baby Geniuses. The feature is considered one of the worst films of all time, receiving an approval rating of 0% on Rotten Tomatoes. Ellen Fox of the Chicago Tribune called Chatwin "the only bright spot" of the film.

In 2004, Chatwin was singled out by Newsweek magazine as an "Actor to Watch", based on his performance as Tyler McKay in the three-part miniseries Traffic. He also starred opposite Kate Mara in The WB pilot Prodigy, about a child prodigy.

=== 2005–2010: Rise to prominence ===
Chatwin was chosen out of several young actors to play Tom Cruise's rebellious adolescent son in the alien invasion film War of the Worlds (2005), directed by Steven Spielberg, based on the 1898 novel by H. G. Wells. It was a commercial success, grossing $603 million worldwide against a $132 million budget, and garnered generally favorable reviews. That same year, he won Hollywood Life magazine's 'Breakthrough of the Year' award.

In 2005, Chatwin also starred as teenage drug dealer Billy Peck in the black comedy The Chumscrubber, alongside Camilla Belle and Jamie Bell. Arie Posin's directorial debut about a group of superficial parents and young adults living a seemingly perfect life, had the world premiere at the Sundance Film Festival on January 25, and was released theatrically on August 5, earning $351,401 on a production budget of $10 million. The film was poorly received by critics; writing for Rolling Stone, Peter Travers opined that it was "an appallingly clumsy and stupid take on drugs, kidnapping and suicide in suburbia". That same month, Chatwin appeared in the Showtime series pilot Weeds as the troubled homosexual son of Kevin Nealon's character. He reprised his role seven years later for the series finale.

In 2006, Chatwin guest-starred as the undercover cop Eddie Colburn on the ABC drama series Lost. Around that time, he was attached to produce and star in a film adaptation of Michael Turner's novel The Pornographer's Poem (1999), with Jeremiah S. Chechik on board to direct. That same year, Chatwin made his off-Broadway debut in Trip Cullman's play Dark Matters at the Rattlestick Playwrights Theater. Following a dysfunctional family whose mother goes missing then suddenly reappears claiming that she was abducted by aliens, Chatwin stars as Jeremy Cleary, the eccentric, but intelligent 16-year-old son of Michael (Reed Birney) and Bridget (Elizabeth Marvel).

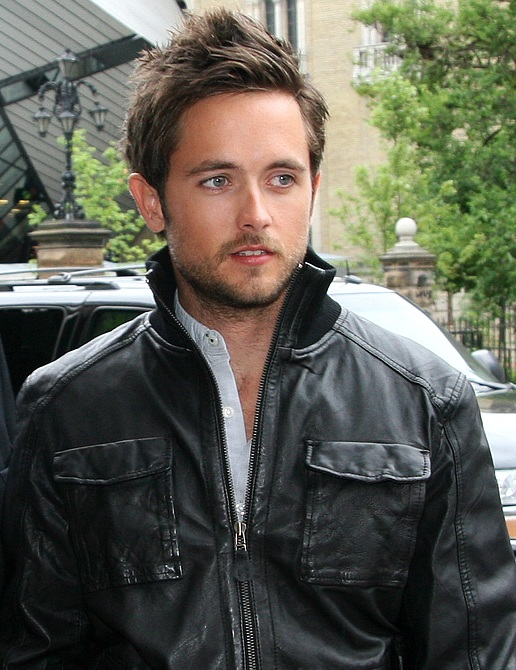
Chatwin at the 2008 Toronto International Film Festival

Chatwin landed his first leading role in The Invisible (2007), a remake of the Swedish film Den Osynlige. David S. Goyer's supernatural thriller centers on high school senior Nick Powell, who is brutally beaten and left in an intermediate state. The film underperformed at the box office, grossing $26 million worldwide on a $30 million budget, and was also poorly received by critics; John Campea noticed a "subtle strength" in Chatwin's performance, writing, "nothing really ever went over the top, nor did he ever come off as forced", but criticized the feature for its "lack of depth" and "dramatic tension". Also in 2007, he returned to the stage to act in Jamie Wollrab's The Mistakes Madeline Made at the Dairy Arts Center in Boulder, Colorado. Chatwin co-starred alongside Anton Yelchin and Eva Amurri in the coming-of-age drama Middle of Nowhere directed by John Stockwell, which premiered at the 2008 Toronto International Film Festival, followed by a straight-to-DVD release two years later.

In 2009, Chatwin portrayed Goku in Dragonball Evolution, the first big-screen adaptation of the popular Japanese Dragon Ball manga by Akira Toriyama. He described the role as the most physically demanding he had ever played, as he had to train in martial arts and adopt a strict diet with no sugar and carbohydrates. The feature was a critical and commercial failure, Ross Miller of the Screen Rant calling it "a badly written film with horrible dialogue, lackluster action and a sense of fun that's nowhere to be found". Miller also felt that Chatwin was "completely miscast" as Goku. In the same year, Chatwin teamed up again with Jamie Wollrab for John Markland's three-person play Red Light Winter at the Dairy Arts Center, during Boulder International Fringe Festival. Written by Adam Rapp, the story sees Wollrab and Chatwin as two friends caught up in a love triangle with a young prostitute they encounter in Amsterdam.

=== 2011–2020: Television and films balance ===
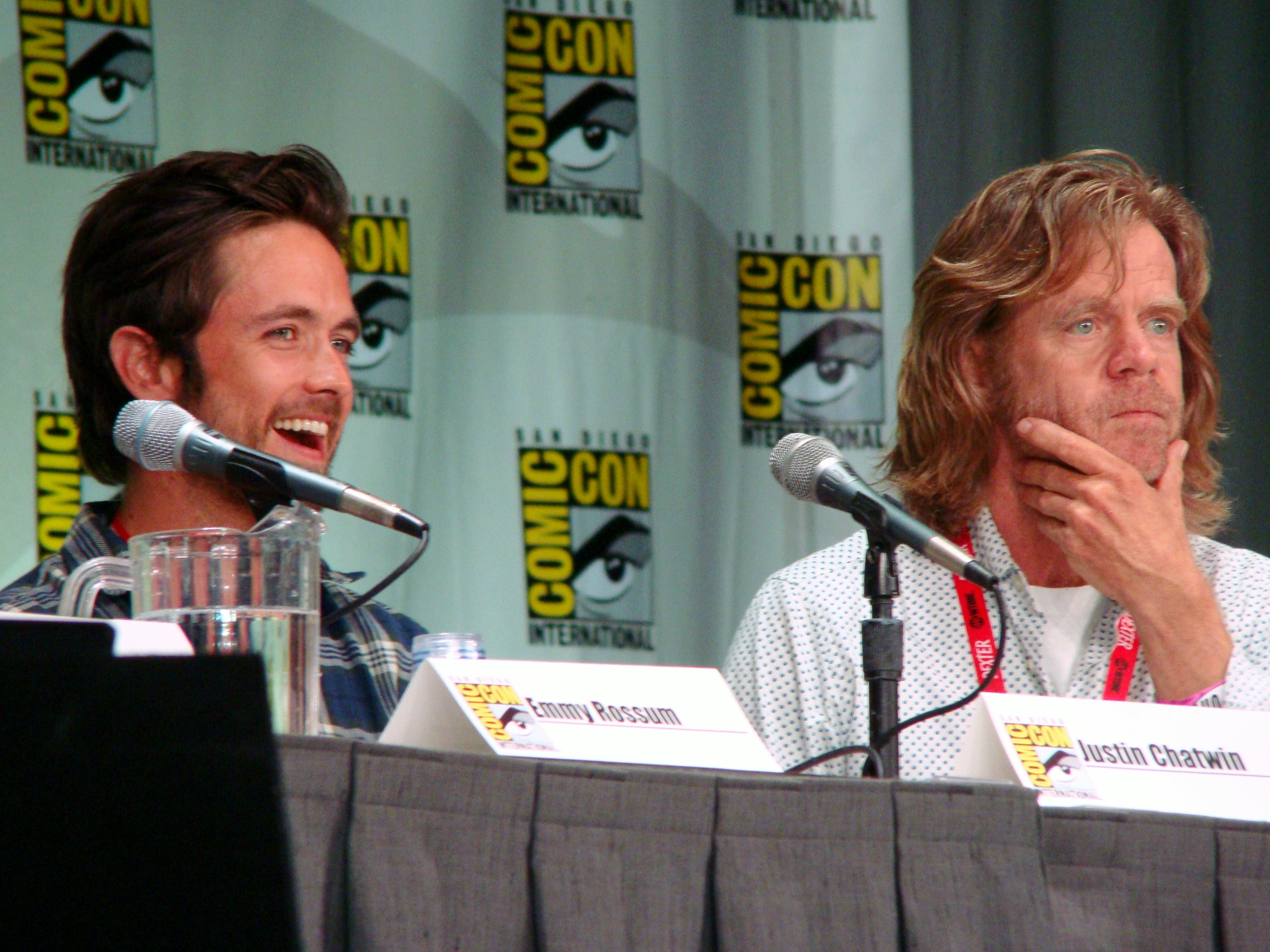
Chatwin alongside William H. Macy at the 2011 San Diego Comic-Con to promote Shameless

In December 2009, Chatwin was filming the Showtime pilot Shameless, an adaptation of Paul Abbott's British series of the same name, starring alongside William H. Macy and Emmy Rossum. The 12-episode first season began airing in January 2011, and over the course of three years, Chatwin portrayed Jimmy Lishman / Steve Wilton, Rossum's love interest, a car thief who comes from a wealthy family. Chatwin made a brief appearance in the fourth season finale, and returned in the fifth season as a special guest star. The show received mostly positive reviews; Eric Goldman of IGN opined that Chatwin brings "the right vibe of scruffy determination" to his role, while another critic noticed his "very intense and intimate chemistry" with Rossum. During an interview, when asked about one of the most controversial aspects of the series, the significant amount of nudity and sex scenes, Chatwin said:

One of the things that attracted me to the project in the first place was getting past my own psychological barriers of being naked in front of people. We all have it. We're all afraid ... I think that we come out of such a Calvinistic, religious, repression era, and I think there's a lot to be said in exploiting our bodies in healthy ways, so that we can towards more liberal, healthy sexual practices. I think this show walks the line with that, and I don't think it's gratuitous".

Since the early 2010s, Chatwin has predominantly acted in independent features that premiered at different film festivals, those receiving later on a day-and-date release. In 2011, Chatwin starred alongside Patrick Huard and Paul Doucet in the canadian film Funkytown. Directed by Daniel Roby, the feature set in Montreal follows a group of characters and the events that changed their lives during the disco era. He plays Tino DeiFiori, a young italian dancer who is hiding a secret. Chatwin was drawn to the part because he "haven't danced a day" in his life: "I'm the guy who sits in the corner at the club and doesn't move". In 2011, he also acted in Shawn Christensen's short film Brink, which earned a nomination for "Best Narrative Short" at the Tribeca Film Festival. In 2013, Chatwin guest-starred in the fourth season of The Listener, and appeared in Isolated, a documentary narrated and executive produced by Ryan Phillippe about a group of surfers in search of untouched waves.

Alongside Jane Levy and Peter Stormare, Chatwin subsequently appeared as rock and roll star Bobby Shore in the Jeffrey St. Jules-directed sci-fi musical set in the '60s Bang Bang Baby (2014), for which he received a Canadian Screen Awards nomination for Best Supporting Actor. His character was based on Vanilla Ice, Justin Bieber and Elvis Presley. The Young Folks critic Josh Cabrita thought Chatwin "perfectly balances celebrity charm, self-absorption, and wooden caricature". In the romantic comedy No Stranger Than Love (2015), which was the closing night film of the 16th annual Newport Beach Film Festival, Chatwin plays a sensitive poet teaming up with a woman (Alison Brie) in order to rescue an unfaithful man (Colin Hanks) trapped in a black hole. The film received negative reviews. In 2015, Chatwin also portrayed a troubled man desperate to retrieve his bike in the short film The Cycle, and recorded the audio version of Celeritas, a screenplay who featured on 2014 Black List.

Chatwin starred as a detective tracking down a mysterious race of creatures in the TNT pilot Breed (2015), and also that year, he secured a recurring role on the third season of Orphan Black, playing opposite Tatiana Maslany and Kristian Bruun. The following year, Chatwin landed the role of cartoonist Cameron Hawthorne in the CBS summer series American Gothic, which centers upon a white-collar family dealing with a serial killer. As a result of the mixed reviews from critics and low ratings, CBS cancelled the show after one season. Chatwin then guest-starred on BBC's Doctor Who as superhero The Ghost and his alter ego Grant Gordon in the show's 2016 Christmas special "The Return of Doctor Mysterio". The episode pays homage to the comic book films, Christopher Reeve's Superman and Tobey Maguire's Spider-Man serving as inspiration for his character. Vulture critic Ross Ruediger praised Chatwin's "splendid" performance.

2016 saw Chatwin appear in four independent films. The western drama Poor Boy premiered as part of the Viewpoints section at the Tribeca Film Festival. Chatwin was then cast opposite Pierce Brosnan in the allegorical thriller Urge, where he starred as an artist unaffected by the title drug which is said to remove your inhibitions. In her 1-star review, Christy Lemire from RogerEbert.com called the film "empty and unlikable as the characters themselves". The romantic comedy Unleashed, written and directed by Finn Taylor, stars Kate Micucci as a woman whose cat and dog are transformed into men (Chatwin and Steve Howey). In preparation for his role, Chatwin studied animal movement with Jean-Louis Rodrigue and Kristof Konrad, in order to embody the specific mannerisms and behavior of a cat. Frank Scheck of The Hollywood Reporter opined that Unleashed works "thanks to its engaging female lead and the exuberantly physical performances of her co-stars". Lastly, Chatwin and Anna Camp played a couple trying to save their marriage in the time travel drama 1 Night, which had its world premiere at the Austin Film Festival. Minhal Baig's directorial debut earned a mixed-to-negative response; despite noting the film's flawed script, Kimber Myers of the Los Angeles Times praised the "solid" performances of the cast.

Chatwin starred in the Joachim Rønning-directed pilot for ABC The Doomsday Project (2017) as Navy SEAL instructor Chris Wyatt. Also that year, he appeared in three films, starting with a cameo as Vincent D'Onofrio's drug-addicted son in the action-comedy CHiPs, directed by Dax Shepard, based on the television series of the same name. Chatwin then portrayed modern-day cowboy Hugh Jay Linder in Blake Robbins' western noir The Scent of Rain and Lightning, based on the 2010 novel of the same name by Nancy Pickard. Making its debut at the Atlanta Film Festival, the film led by Maika Monroe follows a young woman's attempt to uncover the truth behind the death of her parents (Chatwin and Maggie Grace in the flashback sequences). Adam Mast of The Independent praised Chatwin's "subtle and strong" performance. He also had a role in the independent drama We Don't Belong Here, sharing the screen with Riley Keough and Anton Yelchin.

Chatwin later headlined Crackle's original sci-fi movie In the Cloud (2018), in which he plays a computer scientist. That same year, he starred as a rookie detective working on his first major case in the dramatic thriller The Assassin's Code, which was screened at the 42nd Cleveland International Film Festival. Chatwin also featured as a hedonistic bartender named Andy in the ensemble coming-of-age drama Summer Night (2019), directed by Joseph Cross in his directorial debut. Following its premiere at the Atlanta Film Festival in the spring, the film opened in theaters that summer to mixed reviews; Los Angeles Times critic Carlos Aguilar called it "mediocre and forgettable", however, The Hollywood Reporter's critic found Chatwin "very funny" providing the comic relief.

Chatwin played scientist Erik Wallace in Netflix's Another Life (2019–2021), which was panned by critics.

=== 2021–present: Subsequent career ===
Chatwin co-starred opposite Diego Boneta, Alexandra Daddario and Travis Fimmel in the romantic crime film Die in a Gunfight (2021), which has been described as a modern-day version of William Shakespeare's Romeo and Juliet. He plays an unscrupulous stalker loosely based on Tybalt and Count Paris. Although it garnered a negative response, Mae Abdulbaki of Screen Rant opined that Chatwin is "chewing up scenery with gusto and a glint in his eyes" as the film's villain.

In 2022, Chatwin starred as a conflicted police officer in the period drama film The Walk. Directed by Daniel Adams, it centers upon the forced busing in 1974 Boston. Lisa Kennedy of Variety praised the film's performances but criticized its after-school-special vibe, clichéd script and melodramatic tone. Chatwin portrayed Jack Reagan, the father of United States President Ronald Reagan in Sean McNamara's biopic Reagan.

== Motorcycling ==
Chatwin said many times that his biggest passion is motorcycles. He owns a Harley-Davidson Night Train which he named Charlie Crowe. Talking about the beginnings, he said: "I had bought my first motorcycle after riding a scooter on the Amalfi Coast in 2009. Five years later, and a full blown obsession under my belt, I'm back in Italy standing at the epic Ducati factory", adding, "A perfect day for me is when I wake up and know that all I have to do is ride my motorcycle for the next ten hours in a particular direction".

"Some people like scenery. For me it's the road. I just look for two-lane roads. Highways will put you to sleep. The other thing I do is ship my bike to wherever my job is. Then my reward after we wrap is that I get to ride home and camp along the way. It's how I motivate myself to get work."

— Chatwin on motorcycles, 2019

Chatwin has been in many trips with his former Shameless co-stars, William H. Macy and Steve Howey. They have been riding from Los Angeles to Colorado, San Francisco and Aspen, sponsored by Harley-Davidson. In 2014, Chatwin embarked on a trip across Europe with producer Ford Smith and actor Martin Henderson, testing the new Ducati motorcycles.

In order to learn more and improve his skills, in November 2016, over the course of one weekend, Chatwin attended the Keith Code's California Superbike School, alongside actor Nicholas Hoult, motorcycle journalist Sean MacDonald, singer and music producer Albert Hammond Jr. and entrepreneur Jesse Waits. From there, he was invited to test the new AGV Corsa R helmets at Buttonwillow Raceway Park.

In 2017, Chatwin was invited at the inaugural edition of Moto Beach Classic Festival in Southern California. The one-day event was established to promote the moto culture, bringing together artists, bike builders and fans. Chatwin took part at the BMX Boxer Cup challenge against former professional freestyle motocross racer Andy Bell, custom builder Maxwell Hazan and seasoned photographer Preston Burroughs.

Chatwin is also part of WLF Enduro, a community of people from different backgrounds of work, such as teachers, salesmen or construction workers, brought together to ride 200 miles (320 km) in two days every year, throughout Southern California. Their mission is "Unifying riders around the globe with the common passion of two wheels and a throttle". About his decision to join the crew, he said, "This is my hobby. This is my community. This is how I stay happy in a work oriented world. These things are important to me. Because when we die these will be the memories that remain".

=== No Good Reason (2020) ===
The seven-episode documentary was released on the internet on July 29, 2020. It stars Chatwin (who also serves as executive producer) and Nik Markovina (credited Nik Dean), a fellow actor and former model, now the co-founder of Lords of Gastown, a Vancouver-based company specialized on clothing and accessories for motorcycles. After a couple of long rides, they decide to embark on the ultimate journey from Vancouver to Patagonia on their motorcycles named Charlie Crowe and Bobby Valentine. From Santiago to Ecuador and Bariloche, Chatwin and Markovina visit sacred places and meet interesting people, including indigenous rights activist Nina Gualinga. Chatwin stated that he has always been inspired by Bruce Chatwin, his favorite travel writer. Even though the series was released in 2020, the events depicted in it took place in 2016.

== Activism and charity ==
In 2011, Chatwin took part on a charitable motorcycle ride for amfAR, an American foundation for AIDS research, and was one of the celebrities who attended "Stand Up To Cancer", a special event and auction established in order to raise money in the fight against cancer, hosted by Jaime King and Nicky Hilton Rothschild.

In 2013, Chatwin joined Beau Garrett, Mark Foster and Kenna on the new edition of Summit on the Summit project, climbing Kilimanjaro. The purpose was to bring attention on the global water crisis and raise money for the people in need. Regarding the cause, he said, "We just need government will to change these things. It's something I really responded to... everyone in the world should have access to water".

Chatwin was also one of the celebrities who protested against the controversial Keystone XL pipeline. In order to show how the future could look for the environment, he starred alongside Amy Smart in Keystone Horror trailer.

In 2017, Chatwin teamed up for a special ride with Vancouver-based motorcycle company "Lords of Gastown", and charitable organization "Waves for Water", which is dedicated to provide clean water for everyone who needs it. Riding across Central America, the goal was raising money in order to purchase and install clean-water filters for the communities living in Honduras, Guatemala, El Salvador and Nicaragua. Chatwin is also one of the Canadian ambassadors for Operation Smile.

== Personal life ==
Chatwin currently resides in Baja California, Mexico.

Chatwin is an advocate of the nomadic lifestyle. When not working on a film or a television show, he is always on the road, stating, "The anatomy of restlessness is what my fascination is. The nomadic instinct I will call it. And the need of constant movement". In these trips, he is joined usually by Ombú, a Uruguayan street dog which he adopted in 2016.

Having a passion for extreme sports, Chatwin used to snowboard when he lived in Canada, during his high school years. He enjoys spearfishing and film photography. More recently, Chatwin has developed a passion for truck camping and mountain biking.

Chatwin had been in a relationship with Molly Sims. He dated Fallen actress Addison Timlin in 2010.

== Awards and nominations ==
Awards and nominations received by Justin Chatwin
Organizations	Year	Category	Work	Result	Ref.
Canadian Screen Awards	2015	Best Actor in a Supporting Role	Bang Bang Baby	Nominated	
