= Taking Lives =

Taking Lives may refer to:

- Taking Lives (novel), a 1999 thriller novel by Michael Pye
- Taking Lives (film), a 2004 American psychological thriller film, loosely based on the novel
- Taking Lives (album), a 2013 album by Something Awful
