= Cherish (film) =

- Theatrical release poster
- Directed by: Finn Taylor
- Written by: Finn Taylor
- Produced by: Mark Burton; Johnny Wow
- Starring: Robin Tunney; Tim Blake Nelson; Brad Hunt; Liz Phair
- Cinematography: Barry Stone
- Edited by: Rick LeCompte
- Music by: Mark Degli Antoni
- Distributed by: Fine Line Features
- Release date: June 7, 2002
- Running time: 99 minutes
- Country: United States
- Language: English
- Budget: $1.5 million
- Box office: $179,751

Cherish is a 2002 American comedy-drama film written and directed by Finn Taylor. It premiered at the Sundance Film Festival on January 14, 2002 and had a limited theatrical release June 7 of that same year. The movie's title is a nod to The Association's 1966 hit song with the same name.

== Synopsis ==
Zoe Adler (Robin Tunney), is a shy, eccentric and misunderstood computer animator who lives and works in San Francisco, has a love for 1970s and 80s pop music and is infatuated with co-worker Andrew (Jason Priestley). While heading home after a few drinks one night, she is forced into her car by a stalker who steers her into a police officer, knocking him off his bicycle and killing him.

When Zoe is put under house arrest with a story no one believes and an electronic bracelet that keeps her homebound with an ever-increasing list of mandatory and repetitive tasks she must complete or risk going to jail, she must find a way to clear her name. With the help of Daly (Tim Blake Nelson), an officer responsible for checking her bracelet every week who falls for her, a downstairs neighbor, and neighborhood kids, Zoe finds her stalker and tries to clear her name.

== Cast ==
Actor	Role
Robin Tunney	Zoe Adler
Tim Blake Nelson	Daly
Brad Hunt	D.J.
Liz Phair	Brynn
Jason Priestley	Andrew
Nora Dunn	Bell
Lindsay Crouse	Therapist
Ricardo Gil	Max
Kelvin Han Yee	Officer Yee

== Production and release ==
Actor Brad Hunt had appeared in Finn Taylor's previous film Dream with the Fishes (1997), which was released by Sony's arthouse film division Sony Pictures Classics. Cherish would be released by Fine Line Features, the arthouse division of Time Warner-owned New Line Cinema. In 2002, a soundtrack album for Cherish was released by New Line Records, featuring songs from various artists.

The Region 1 DVD was originally released June 1, 2004 and then re-released on October 25, 2005 with new cover art.

== Reception ==
=== Critical response ===
Roger Ebert gave the film three stars and a thumbs up. He praised Tunney, saying that "she brings a quiet goofiness to the role that is a much better choice than grim heroism or calm competence or some of the other speeds she could have chosen." He also complimented Ricardo Gil who plays Max, a gay dwarf who lives downstairs from Zoe and befriends her.

Elvis Mitchell of The New York Times liked it "as a poky little character comedy...enchanting in a small-scale way" but was critical of Taylor for trying "to shift the tone to a thriller's rush." He added, "The film lacks the horsepower for the 0-to-60-pickup needed for Zoe's Nancy Drew-like investigations of her stalker." He was also disappointed by the lack of development of characters beyond Zoe.
