= Jean-Louis Rodrigue =

- Born: Casablanca, Morocco
- Citizenship: American
- Occupations: Acting coach and teacher of the Alexander Technique
- Website: www.alexandertechworks.com/jean-louis%20rodrigue/

Jean-Louis Rodrigue is an acting coach, movement director, author, and senior teacher of the Alexander Technique. He has worked in Los Angeles and New York in theatre, film, television, and digital media.

Rodrigue has taught at the Berlin International Film Festival, Generation Campus in Moscow, Verbier Festival in Switzerland, Universidad de la Comunicación (México) in Mexico City, Berlinale Talents in Guadalajara, USC Thornton School of Music, Manhattan School of Music, National Institute of Dramatic Art in Sydney, and Digital Life Design Women in Munich. Rodrigue has been a faculty member at the UCLA School of Theater, Film and Television and the UCLA Herb Alpert School of Music for the past 34 years.

== Early life and education ==
Jean-Louis Rodrigue was born in Casablanca, Morocco, and was raised in Milan, Italy.

At eight years old, he decided to become an actor after viewing Ferruccio Soleri in “Arlecchino, Servant of Two Masters” at Piccolo Teatro di Milano. In 1967, he began working with Herbert Berghof at the HB Studio and Sonia Moore at the American Center for Stanislavski Theater Art in New York.

In 1970, William Ball awarded Rodrigue a full scholarship to study in the Advanced Training Program at the American Conservatory Theater (ACT) in San Francisco. During Rodrigue's training at ACT, he discovered the Alexander Technique. He then stayed three more years to train at the American Center for the Alexander Technique, San Francisco.

In post-formal training, Rodrigue studied with Alexander Technique teachers Marjorie Barstow, Walter Carrington, Patrick McDonald, and Dilys Carrington. Rodrigue is also a certified teacher of Jessica Wolf's The Art of Breathing.

== Teaching career ==
In 1980, Rodrigue founded Alexander Techworks. The company provides private instruction, training, coaching, group classes, and workshops in Los Angeles, New York, and other cities. He and Kristof Konrad own and operate the business together.

From 1998 to 2005, Rodrigue was part of the faculty of Verbier Festival.

Rodrigue teaches workshops at Larry Moss' Studio. He has taught masterclasses at the Howard Fine Acting Studios in Los Angeles and Australia. He founded the Alexander Technique program at the Los Angeles Philharmonic, where he taught for six years. He has worked with circus artists of Cirque du Soleil's Ka at the MGM Grand in Las Vegas.

He had reportedly been hired in by the FBI to teach stress management and respiratory control for agents infiltrating Middle Eastern terrorist cells.

=== Film and television ===
Rodrigue has coached actors in films including: I, Tonya, Vice, Mary Queen of Scots, Love and Mercy (film), J. Edgar, W., Passion Fish, The Time Machine, Seabiscuit (film), and The Normal Heart (film). He collaborated with director Ang Lee and screenwriter David Magee in the development of the tiger movement for the film Life of Pi. Rodrigue choreographed the period movement for the film The Affair of the Necklace.

Since 2009, Rodrigue has conducted several workshops at the Berlinale Talent Campus program. He was involved in the development of a new hands-on training programs for emerging actors, the Talent Actors Stage, for which 15-20 international actors are selected annually.

=== Theatre ===
Rodrigue has coached at several Los Angeles locations throughout his career. At the Geffen Playhouse, Rodrigue was the movement coach on Nine Parts of Desire in 2005 and on Long Day's Journey into Night in 2017. He was awarded a fellowship grant from the Montalvo Arts Center to develop and direct a play adaptation of the novel, The Reader. He coached Chris Pine in The Lieutenant of Inishmore at the Mark Taper Forum. He also worked with Gulu Monteiro on The Bacchae at the Getty Villa.

Rodrigue has collaborated with Larry Moss on Daisy White's Sugar, The Syringa Tree at Playhouse 91 in New York and Bo Eason's Runt of the Litter at the 37 Arts Theater, N.Y. He has coached with Rita Maffei and Larry Moss in an Italian production of The Syringa Tree at the Teatro Stabile di Innovazione in Udine and at Il Piccolo Teatro di Milano, Italy.

=== Animal Studies ===
Rodrigue integrates animal behavior and movement into his research and work. He is known for helping actors develop characters through animal movement studies. His primary areas of research are animal movement, behavior, morphology, nature perception, and human/animal connections. This interest was sparked by Leonardo da Vinci and Carlo Mazzone-Clementi.

While in Milano in 1957, Rodrigue's father introduced him to the scientific and artistic work of DaVinci. They would often go to the National Museum of Science and Technology to view the models of DaVinci's inventions. They also would visit the Veneranda Biblioteca Ambrosiana, the largest archive of Da Vinci's drawings of animals.

Later in his life while studying at the American Conservatory Theater in San Francisco, Jean-Louis studied with Mazzone-Clementi who introduced him to the application of animal behavior and movement to character development.

== Select awards and recognition ==
Rodrigue was awarded a fellowship grant in 2008 from the Montalvo Arts Center to develop and direct a play adaptation of Bernhard Schlink's novel, The Reader.

== Credits ==
=== Filmography ===
Year	Film	Actor/Consulting Work	Role	Director
2024	Destroy All Neighbors	Alex Winter/Counterpart Pictures	Character Movement Coaching/Alexander Technique	Josh Forbes
2023	The Burial (film)	Jurnee Smollett/Amazon Studios	Character Movement Coaching/Alexander Technique	Maggie Betts
2023	Barbie (film)	Margot Robbie/Warner Bros.	Character Movement Coaching/Alexander Technique	Greta Gerwig
2022	Everything Everywhere All at Once	Ke Huy Quan/A24	Character Movement Coaching/Alexander Technique	Daniel Kwan Daniel Scheinert
2022	Babylon (2022 film)	Margot Robbie/Paramount Pictures	Character Movement Coaching/Alexander Technique	Damien Chazelle
2022	Lou (2022 film)	Jurnee Smollett/Bad Robot	Character Movement Coaching/Alexander Technique	Anna Foerster
2020	Bill & Ted Face the Music	Alex Winter /Orion	Character Movement Coaching/Alexander Technique	Dean Parisot
2020	Birds of Prey (2020 film)	Margot Robbie/Warner Brothers	Character and Movement Coaching/Alexander Technique	Cathy Yan
2019	Once Upon a Time in Hollywood	Margot Robbie/Columbia Pictures	Character Movement Coaching/Alexander Technique	Quentin Tarantino
2019	Dreamland (2019 American film)	Margot Robbie/Eagle Films	Character and Movement Coaching/Alexander Technique	Miles Joris-Peyrafitte
2019	Buffaloed	Zoey Deutch/Lost City	Character and Movement Coaching/Alexander Technique	Tanya Wexler
2018	Vice (2018 film)	Christian Bale/Annapurna Pictures	Character and Movement Coaching/Alexander Technique	Adam McKay
2018	Mary Queen of Scots (2018 film)	Margot Robbie/Focus Features	Character and Movement Coaching/Alexander Technique	Josie Rourke
2018	Set It Up	Zoey Deutch/Netflix	Character and Movement Coaching/Alexander Technique	Claire Scanlon
2017	I, Tonya	Margot Robbie/Miramax	Character and Movement Coaching/Alexander Technique	Craig Gillespie
2017	Disobedience	Rachel McAdams/Braven Films	Character and Movement Coaching/Alexander Technique	Sebastian Lelio
2017	Anything (film)	Matt Bomer/Great Point Media	Character and Movement Coaching/Alexander Technique	Timothy McNeil
2017	Okja	Paul Dano/Netflix	Character and Movement Coaching/Alexander Technique	Joon-Ho Bong
2017	Flower	Zoey Deutch/Diablo Entertainment	Character and Movement Coaching/Alexander Technique	Max Winkler
2016	Unleashed (2016 film)	Justin Chatwin/Braveheart Films	Character and Movement Coaching/Alexander Technique	Finn Taylor
2014	Pawn Sacrifice	Tobey Maguire/Lionsgate	Character and Movement Coaching/Alexander Technique	Edward Swick
2014	Lucky Stiff	Cast/Arclight Films	Character and Movement Coaching/Alexander Technique	Christopher Ashley
2014	The Normal Heart (film)	Matt Bomer/HBO	Character and Movement Coaching/Alexander Technique	Ryan Murphy
2014	Love & Mercy (film)	Paul Dano/Roadside Attractions	Character and Movement Coaching/Alexander Technique	Bill Pohlad
2012	Life of Pi (film)	Fox 2000 Pictures	Consultant on Tiger Movement	Ang Lee
2011	Citizen Gangster	Scott Speedman/Myriad Pictures	Character and Movement Coaching/Alexander Technique	Nathan Morlando
2011	J. Edgar	Leonardo DiCaprio/Warner Brothers	Character and Movement Coaching/Alexander Technique	Clint Eastwood
2010	Barney's Version (film)	Scott Speedman/Sony Pictures	Character and Movement Coaching/Alexander Technique	Richard J. Lewis
2008	W. (film)	Josh Brolin/Ixtlan Corp.	Character and Movement Coaching/Alexander Technique	Oliver Stone
2005	Bee Season (film)	Juliette Binoche/Fox-Searchlight	Character and Movement Coaching/Alexander Technique	Scott McGee David Siegal
2003	Seabiscuit	Elizabeth Banks/Universal	Character and Movement Coaching/Alexander Technique	Gary Ross
2002	The Syringa Tree	Pamela Gien/Trio Network	Character and Movement Coaching/Alexander Technique	Larry Moss
2002	The Time Machine (2002 film)	Samantha Mumba & Cast/DreamWorks	Creature Movement Choreography	Simon Wells
2001	The Affair of the Necklace	Hilary Swank & Cast/Warner Brothers	Period Movement/Coaching	Charles Shyer
2001	Human Nature (2001 film)	Patricia Arquette/Fine Line	Character and Animal Movement Coaching/Alexander Technique	Michel Gondry
2001	The Cat's Meow	Kirsten Dunst/Lions Gate Films	Character and Movement Coaching/Alexander Technique	Peter Bogdanovich
1996	Partners	Tate Donovan/Fox Television	Character and Movement Coaching/Alexander Technique	Multiple
1996	HBO Comedy Half-Hour	Wendy Liebman/HBO	Character and Movement Coaching	Troy Miller
1994	It's Pat	Julia Sweeney/Touchstone	Character and Movement Coaching/Alexander Technique	Adam Bernstein
1993	Little Buddha	Keanu Reeves/Miramax	Character and Movement Coaching/Alexander Technique	Bernardo Bertolucci
1993	Freaked	Keanu Reeves/20th Century Fox	Character and Movement Coaching/Alexander Technique	Alex Winter
1992	Passion Fish	Mary McDonell/Columbia	Character and Movement Coaching/Alexander Technique	John Sayles

=== Theater ===
Production	Actor	Role	Theater	Director
How To Disappear Completely and Never Be Found	Brad Culver	Character and Movement Coaching/Alexander Technique	Boston Court	Nancy Keystone
The Lieutenant of Inishmore	Chris Pine	Character and Movement Coaching/Alexander Technique	Mark Taper Forum	Wilson Milam
The Syringa Tree	Rita Maffei	Character and Movement Coaching/Alexander Technique	Piccolo Teatro, Milano	Larry Moss
The Reader	Cast	Director	Montalvo Arts Center	Self
King Lear/The Seagull	Sir Ian McKellen	Character and Movement Coaching/Alexander Technique	RSC - UCLA Live	Trevor Nunn
Runt of the Litter	Bo Eason	Character and Movement Coaching/Alexander Technique	37 Arts Theater, NYC	Larry Moss
The Bacchae	Cast	Character and Movement Coaching/Alexander Technique	Getty Villa	Gulu Montiero
KA	Cast	Character and Movement Coaching/Alexander Technique	Cirque du Soleil	Robert Le Page
Nine Parts of Desire	Heather Raffo	Character and Movement Coaching/Alexander Technique	Geffen Playhouse	Joanna Settle
Sugar	Daisy White	Character and Movement Coaching/Alexander Technique	Edgemar Center	Larry Moss
Gretty Good Time	Ann Stocking	Character and Movement Coaching/Alexander Technique	Falcon Theater	John Regalbuto
Runt of the Litter	Bo Eason	Character and Movement Coaching/Alexander Technique	MCC Theater, NY	Larry Moss
The Syringa Tree	Pamela Gien	Character and Movement Development/Alexander Technique	Playhouse 91, NY	Larry Moss
The Syringa Tree	Pamela Gien, Cast	Character and Movement Development/Alexander Technique	National Tour	Larry Moss
The Cryptogram & the Old Neighborhood	Christine Dunford	Character and Movement Coaching/Alexander Technique	Geffen Playhouse	Michael Bloom
Skylight	Sally Murphy	Character and Movement Coaching/Alexander Technique	Steppenwolf Theater	Mike Nussbaum
The Triumph of Isabella	Cast	Character and Movement Coaching/Alexander Technique	Geffen Playhouse	John Achorn
The Prodigious Snob	Cast	Character and Movement Coaching/Alexander Technique	UCLA Little Theatre	Ellen Geer
Scenes from an Execution	Natalija Nogulich	Character and Movement Coaching/Alexander Technique	Mark Taper Forum	Robert Allan Ackerman
La Nouvelle Experience (collaborated with Debra Brown)	Cast	Character and Movement Coaching/Alexander Technique	Cirque du Soleil	Franco Dragone
Accomplice	Natalija Nogulich	Character and Movement Coaching/Alexander Technique	Broadway	Rupert Holmes
