= Brad Hunt (actor) =

American actor, singer-songwriter, and horseman

- Born: Moberly, Missouri, U.S.
- Occupations: Actor, singer-songwriter, producer, horseman
- Years active: 1990–present

Brad Hunt is an American actor, singer-songwriter, producer, and horseman. He is best known for his emotionally intense performances in independent film and television, including a breakout role in Dream with the Fishes (1997). Hunt won the Best Actor award at Screamfest for his role in the psychological thriller Cookers (2001). He was also the frontman of the Los Angeles punk/country band Stiky Sideup and divides his time between Los Angeles and rural Missouri, where he works closely with wild mustangs.

== Career ==
=== Acting ===
Hunt began his screen career in the early 1990s, appearing in series such as Freddy's Nightmares, The Wonder Years, and SeaQuest 2032. His breakout performance came in Dream with the Fishes (1997), written and directed by Finn Taylor, which premiered at the Sundance Film Festival and earned critical attention.

Taylor went on to cast Hunt in two additional features: Cherish (2002), opposite Robin Tunney and Tim Blake Nelson, and The Darwin Awards (2006), in which Hunt appeared alongside David Arquette. All three films were written and directed by Taylor.

Hunt has also worked with several acclaimed directors, including Paul Thomas Anderson (Magnolia), Ted Demme (Blow), and Nicolas Winding Refn, who cast him in the Amazon Prime series Too Old to Die Young. Refn selected Episode 5 — which features Hunt as Rob Crockett — to screen at the Cannes Film Festival. In a 2024 post on Reddit, Refn wrote: “Rewatching Episode 5 now and really appreciating Brad Hunt's performance.”

His additional film credits include Mulholland Falls (1996), Hart's War (2002), Cookers (2001) — for which he won Best Actor at the Screamfest Horror Film Festival — and The Tripper (2006).

On television, Hunt has appeared in CSI: Crime Scene Investigation, Monk, NYPD Blue, The Bridge, Criminal Minds, Too Old to Die Young, and The Rookie.

In 2022, he starred in the indie drama Alex/October and served as executive producer on Three Headed Beast, which premiered at the Tribeca Film Festival.

=== Music ===
Hunt was the frontman of the Los Angeles-based band Stiky Sideup, which blended punk and country influences. The group featured musicians Michael Thompson, Albert Trepagnier, and Desmond Hillard.

== Awards ==
- Best Actor – Cookers, Screamfest Horror Film Festival (2001)

== Filmography ==
=== Film ===
Year	Title	Role	Notes
1994	Post Cards from America	Driver	
1996	Ed	Carnie	
1996	Mulholland Falls	Guard	
1997	Dream with the Fishes	Nick	
1997	Fire Down Below	Orin, Jr.	
1999	Clubland	King	
1999	Magnolia	Craig Hansen	
2001	Blow	GG	
2001	Cookers	Hector	
2002	Cherish	D.J.	
2002	Hart's War	Pvt. G.H. 'Cookie' Bell	
2005	Lucky 13	Zach Baker	
2006	The Darwin Awards	Stan	
2006	The Plague	Sam Raynor	Direct-to-video
2006	The Tripper	Hank	
2008	Just Add Water	Denny	
2017	Billy Boy	Frank	
2022	Alex/October	Alex	

=== Television ===
Year	Title	Role	Notes
1989	Freddy's Nightmares	Kurt	Episode: "Do You Know Where Your Kids Are?"
1991	The Wonder Years	Billy	Episode: "The Lake"
1993	SeaQuest DSV	Le Chein Guard	Episode: "To Be or Not to Be"
2003	NYPD Blue	Jerry Wells	3 episodes
2004	CSI: Crime Scene Investigation	Rory Kendell	Episode: "Crow's Feet"
2006	In Justice	Paul Buckner	Episode: "Cost of Freedom"
2006	Monk	Kris Kedder	Episode: "Mr. Monk Goes to a Rock Concert"
2008	Numbers	Cameron Wilson	Episode: "Charlie Don't Surf"
2009	Dollhouse	Jesse Dillard	Episode: "True Believer"
2009	Cold Case	Stan Cronin	Episode: "Forensics"
2013	Major Crimes	Dwayne Bloom	Episode: "False Pretenses"
2014	Perception	Martin Grant	Episode: "Bolero"
2014	The Bridge	The Chopper	2 episodes
2016	You're the Worst	Tow Truck Driver	Episode: "Twenty-Two"
2016, 2017	The Last Tycoon	Jamey Moran	2 episodes
2018	Criminal Minds	Casey Peters	Episode: "Submerged"
2019	Too Old to Die Young	Rob Crockett	Episode: "Volume 5: The Fool"
