= Lucky 13 =

2005 film by Chris Hall

- Directed by: Chris Hall
- Written by: Ari Schlossberg; Chris Hall; Eric Swelstad (story); Ira Heffler (story)
- Produced by: Alan Kaplan; Chris Hall; Richard Cooper
- Starring: Brad Hunt; Harland Williams; Lauren Graham; Sasha Alexander; Debra Jo Rupp; John Doe; Kaley Cuoco; Taryn Manning
- Cinematography: Michael Barrett
- Music by: Hal Lindes; Herman Beeftink
- Distributed by: MGM Home Entertainment
- Release date: 2005
- Running time: 95 minutes
- Language: English

Lucky 13 is a 2005 American romantic comedy film directed by Chris Hall and starring Brad Hunt and Harland Williams, with music by Debra Jo Rupp.

== Plot ==
This film is about Zach Baker and his quest to go back through his past experiences with women so he will have the perfect date with his lifelong friend, Abbey. Abbey would be the thirteenth woman he has gone out with and he hopes she will be "Lucky 13".

The story revolves around Zach asking each woman what he did wrong in their relationship, so as to not make the same mistakes with Abbey. A recurring gag involves Zach throwing objects, representing his past affairs, into a lake. During the course of the film, Zach makes changes to his appearance and demeanor, trying to emulate the advice he gets from his past girlfriends—most of which is contradictory.

After much soul-searching, Zach decides to ask Abbey to marry him—a proposal that she turns down in order to move to New York City and pursue her dream of being an artist. Zach eventually comes to realize that his life in the Midwest is not so bad and he gains a new appreciation for his family and friends.

== Cast ==
- Brad Hunt as Zach Baker
- Harland Williams as Bleckman
- Lauren Graham as Abbey
- Sasha Alexander as Susie
- Debra Jo Rupp as Mrs. Baker
- John Doe as Mr. Baker
- Kaley Cuoco as Sarah Baker
- Pamela Adlon as Brenda (billed as Pamela Segall-Adlon)
- Ever Carradine as Gretchen
- Amanda Detmer as Amy
- Ali Elk as Gina Rivinni
- Jenna Fischer as Sorority Girl 1
- Michaela Gallo as Young Abbey
- Brian Gattas as Umberto
- Alex Kapp as Woman Home Buyer (billed as Alex Kapp Horner)
- Jocelyne Kelly as Dawn Kramer
- Michael Landes as Seth
- Taryn Manning as Sam
- Jessica Meyerson as Stacy Reese
- Kelly Coffield Park as Kelly Woodward (billed as Kelly Coffield)
- Josh Randall as Franz
- Brande Roderick as Coolmint Girl
- Becky Wahlstrom as Toni

== Critical reception ==
The film was panned in a review that appeared in the Observer newspaper in Ontario, which said, "It's a monotonous combination of a poor script, bizarre and/or uninteresting characters and a trio of heroes you really just don't care about."
