= Clubland (1999 film) =

- Directed by: Mary Lambert
- Produced by: Glen Ballard; Mimi Polk Gitlin; Guy J. Louthan
- Starring: Lori Petty; Brad Hunt; Jimmy Tuckett
- Cinematography: John L. Demps Jr.
- Edited by: Sharyn L. Ross
- Music by: Glen Ballard
- Release date: April 16, 1999
- Running time: 94 minutes
- Country: United States
- Language: English
- Box office: $18,529

Clubland is a 1999 American musical film directed by Mary Lambert and written by Glen Ballard and Todd Robinson.

== Cast ==
- Jimmy Tuckett as Kennedy
- Brad Hunt as King
- Heather Stephens as Sophie
- Rodney Eastman as Mondo
- Lori Petty as India
- Phil Buckman as Paul
- Jon Sklaroff as Eddie
- Terence Trent D'Arby as Toby
- Toby Huss as Rastus
- Alexis Arquette as Steven
- Grant Heslov as Matt
- Buddy Quaid as Vernon
- Susie Spear as Ally
- Steven Tyler as David Foster
