= Hala (film) =

2019 film

- Theatrical release poster
- Directed by: Minhal Baig
- Written by: Minhal Baig
- Produced by: Minhal Baig; Clarence Hammond; James Lassiter; Jamal M. Watson
- Starring: Geraldine Viswanathan; Jack Kilmer; Gabriel Luna; Anna Chlumsky
- Cinematography: Carolina Costa
- Edited by: Saela Davis
- Music by: Mandy Hoffman
- Production companies: Endeavor Content; Overbrook Entertainment
- Distributed by: Apple Original Films (through Apple TV+)
- Release dates: January 26, 2019 (Sundance); November 22, 2019 (United States)
- Running time: 93 minutes
- Country: United States
- Language: English

Hala is a 2019 American drama film written and directed by Minhal Baig. The film was screened in the U.S. Dramatic Competition section at the 2019 Sundance Film Festival, and was released in a limited theatrical release on November 22, 2019, followed by digital streaming on December 6, 2019, by Apple TV+. The film received generally positive reviews. It is based on a previous short film by Baig made in 2016 by the same name.

== Plot ==
Hala Masood is a seventeen year old Pakistani American Muslim girl struggling with the clash of her family's values versus her desires. Her mom worries about Hala being near boys and skateboarding, while she has a secret crush on a boy in her school named Jesse, who's a non-Muslim (it's expected Hala will have her marriage arranged with a Muslim man). Things gradually come to a head as Hala is drawn toward Jesse, against her family's wishes. In the meantime, she learns her parents' marriage has problems she never knew of before.

== Cast ==
- Geraldine Viswanathan as Hala Masood
- Jack Kilmer as Jesse
- Purbi Joshi as Eram Masood
- Azad Khan as Zahid Masood
- Gabriel Luna as Mr. Lawrence
- Anna Chlumsky as Shannon Taylor
- Taylor Blim as Melanie

== Production ==
In November 2017, Geraldine Viswanathan, Jack Kilmer, Anna Chlumsky, Gabriel Luna, Purbi Joshi and Azad Khan joined the cast of the film, with Minhal Baig directing from a screenplay she wrote.

== Release ==
It had its world premiere at the Sundance Film Festival on January 26, 2019. Shortly after, Apple TV+ acquired distribution rights to the film. It was released in a limited theatrical release on November 22, 2019, followed by digital streaming on December 6, 2019.

== Reception ==
Hala received positive reviews from film critics. It holds an 86% approval rating on review aggregator website Rotten Tomatoes, based on 37 reviews, with an average of 7.4/10. The critics consensus reads, "Supported by a powerful central performance by Geraldine Viswanathan, Hala offers an insightful look at a young woman's journey of self-discovery." On Metacritic, the film holds a rating of 75 out of 100, based on 11 critics, indicating "generally favorable" reviews.

In a positive review for The AV Club, Saloni Gajjar praised the film for shining "a new light on the tropes of teenage self-discovery". Writing for Variety, Amy Nicholson praised Baig's "naturalistic touch" and Viswanathan's performance, saying it proved "her range and, hopefully, longevity". Criticism was directed at the second half of the film, with Beandra July, writing for The Hollywood Reporter, criticizing the film's "choppy, incoherent finish".
