= Melina Vidler =

Australian actress (born 1993)

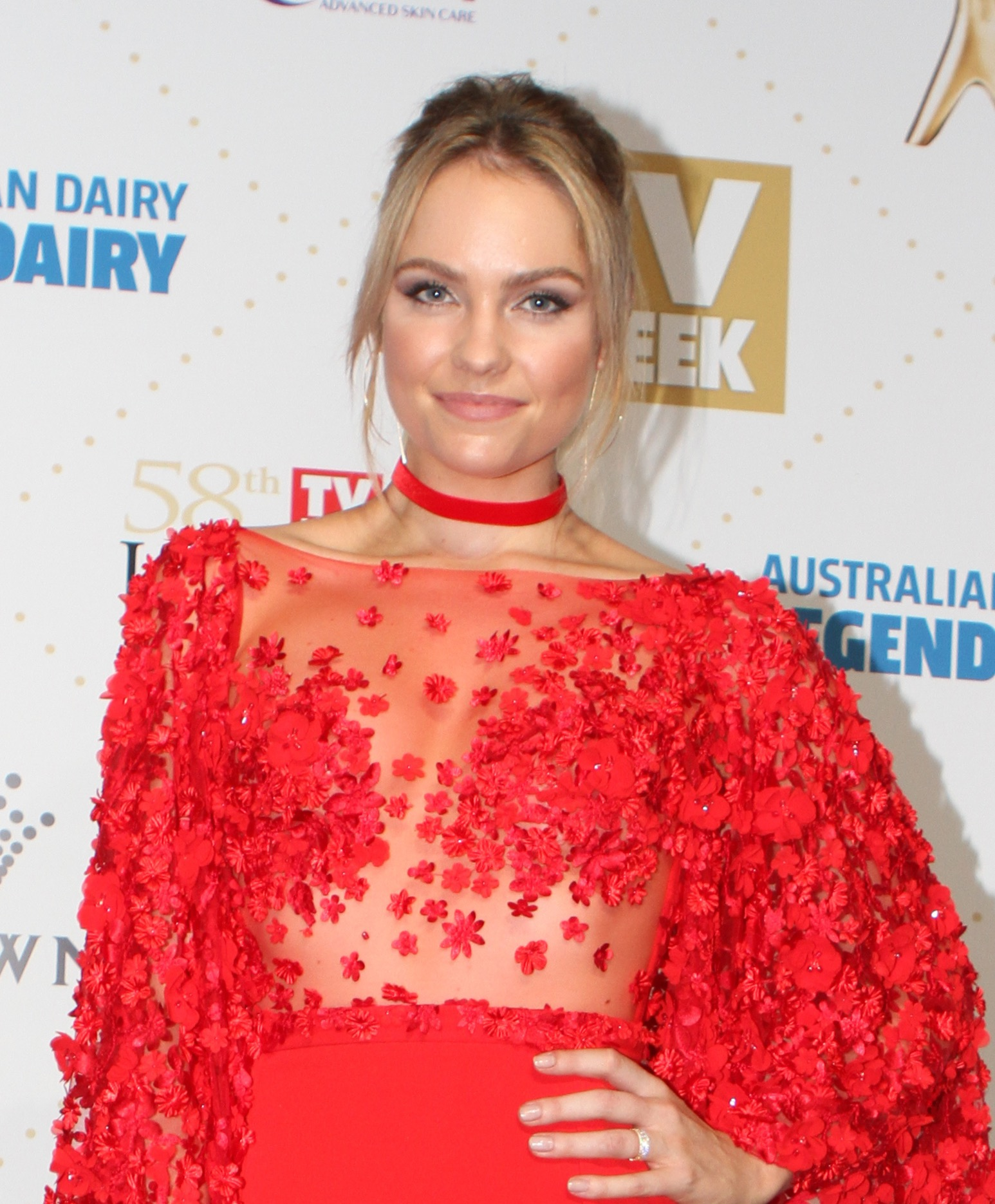
- Vidler at the 2016 Logie Awards
- Born: 20 February 1993 (age 33); Brisbane, Queensland, Australia
- Education: Queensland University of Technology
- Occupation: Actress
- Years active: 2015–present

Melina Vidler (born 20 February 1993) is an Australian actress, known for her role as Shay Turner in 800 Words, for which she won the Logie Award for Most Outstanding Newcomer in 2016.

== Early life ==
Vidler was born in Brisbane and grew up in Samford, Queensland, the daughter of Kaylene and Wayne Vidler, a property developer. She has two older brothers, Beau and Brent.

In 2010, Vidler graduated from Ferny Grove State High School in Brisbane, and went on to study acting at the Queensland University of Technology. She later moved to Sydney, New South Wales to pursue an acting career.

== Filmography ==
Year	Title	Role	Notes
2015	Mako: Island of Secrets	Northern Mermaid	Episode: "The Siren"
2015–2018	800 Words	Shay Turner	40 episodes
2016	Rake	Monique	Episode: "4.5"
2016	Brock	Alexandra Brock	2 episodes
2017	Dirty, Clean & Inbetween	Sky Stone	Television film
2019	Summer Night	Vanessa	Film
2019	Reef Break	Tori Eastland	ABC USA
