= Kristof Konrad =

Polish Actor and acting coach (born 1962)

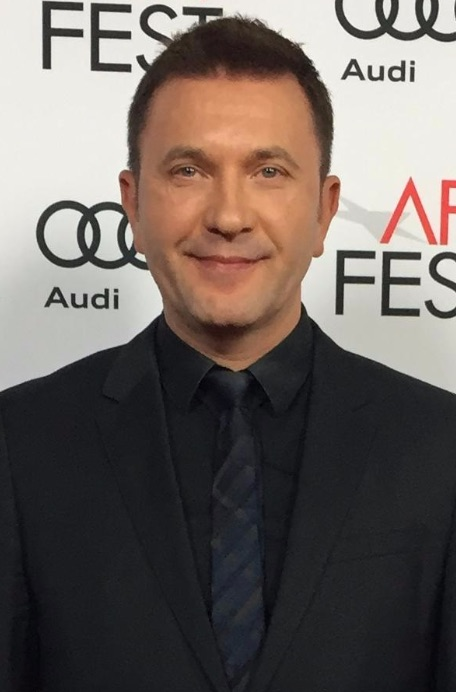
- Konrad at AFI Fest in Los Angeles, 2016
- Born: Krzysztof Wojslaw; April 26, 1962 (age 64); Gizycko, Poland
- Occupations: Actor, acting, and voice coach
- Website: alexandertechworks.com/about-alexander-techworks

Kristof Konrad (born Krzysztof Wojslaw, April 26, 1962) is a Polish-American film, television, theatre, actor, acting and character movement coach, voice and breath coach, and the Alexander Technique teacher. He is a Co-Dir of Alexander Techworks. For over twenty five years, he has successfully worked in film and television in both the United States and Europe, working with directors such as Kenneth Branagh, Francis Lawrence, Ron Howard, and Roland Emmerich and working opposite actors such as Jennifer Lawrence, Robin Wright, Kerry Washington, Jennifer Garner, and many more. He currently resides in Los Angeles and works internationally.

== Early life ==
Kristof Konrad (birth name Krzysztof Wojsław) was born on April 26, 1962, in Gizycko, Poland. His father, Mieczyslaw, was a working-class man, and his mother, Jadwiga, was a school teacher. He studied to become an electrical engineer, but at 23, he decided to pursue a career in acting. For the next two years (1985-1987), Konrad attended the Alexander Zelwerowicz National Dramatic Academy in Warsaw, Poland. While there, he studied and worked with theatre and film masters Jerzy Grotowski and Andrzej Wajda. Upon graduating, he moved to Rome, Italy, where he studied with Alessandro Fersen at The Fersen Studio until 1992.

== Career ==
=== Acting ===
After studying and working in Europe for seven years, Konrad moved to Hollywood in 1992. For over thirty years, he has successfully worked in film and television in the United States and Europe. He began his film career with a role in Independence Day directed by Roland Emmerich, followed by roles in Hotel California, Angels & Demons, Chernobyl Diaries, and many more. Some of his television credits include: Scorpion, Zoo, Agents of S.H.I.E.L.D., House of Cards, Scandal, Nikita, Alias, and many more.

Konrad appeared as Dimitri Ustinov, opposite Jennifer Lawrence, in the spy thriller Red Sparrow (2018), directed by Francis Lawrence and based on Jason Matthews' book of the same name. It follows Dominika Egorova (Lawrence), a Russian intelligence rookie who is assigned to seduce a CIA officer; she later falls in love with the officer and considers being a double agent.

Konrad played Igor Zavarov in The Invisible Boy: Second Generation.

=== Movement specialist and acting coach ===
Early in his career, Konrad discovered the Alexander Technique while working in the U.S. and was fascinated by its "effectiveness in improving the level of acting and helping one cope with the stresses of performing and everyday life." He spent three years training as an Alexander Technique teacher with Jean-Louis Rodrigue and many others at Alexander Training Institute of Los Angeles, where he also received his certification.

Konrad has taught for the Berlin International Film Festival, Verbier Festival & Academy in Switzerland, and the UBS Verbier Junior Orchestra. He teaches acting in Film and Alexander Technique Intensive Workshops in New York, Los Angeles, Milan, Berlin, Toronto, and Vancouver. He collaborates with Jean-Louis Rodrigue at the Larry Moss Studio, Howard Fine Acting Studio, UCLA Extension Entertainment Studies, Theatricum Botanicum, and Media Access.

Konrad worked with the cast of King Lear and The Seagull of The Royal Shakespeare Company; helped Sharon Lawrence to create Vivien Leigh in Orson's Shadow at the Pasadena Playhouse; worked with the cast of Electricidad at the Mark Taper Forum, and worked with the artists of Cirque du Soleil’s Ka on improving performance and preventing injuries.

Konrad coached Lymari Nadal in embodying Eva, the love interest of Denzel Washington in American Gangster.

== Filmography (selection) ==
=== Film ===
Year	Title	Role	Notes
1994	A Perry Mason Mystery: The Case of the Lethal Lifestyle	Polish Speaker	TV movie
1996	Independence Day	Russian Pilot #2	
1999	Operation Samum	Jeff Magnus	
2000	The Dukes of Hazzard: Hazzard in Hollywood	Misha	TV movie
2006	Veiled	Theadore Trippe	
2008	Hotel California	Yuri	
2009	Angels & Demons	Polish Reporter	
2011	Paracusia	Yuri	Short film
2012	Chernobyl Diaries	Medic Grotzky	
2015	All These Voices	Janusz	Short film
2015	Breathe	Dr. Filip Kardel	Short film
2016	The Persian Connection	Kiril	
2017	The Zookeeper's Wife	Polish Radio Announcer	Uncredited
2018	The Invisible Boy: Second Generation	Igor Zavarov	
2018	Red Sparrow	Dimitri Ustinov	

=== Television ===
- Lois & Clark: The New Adventures of Superman (one episode, 1995) - Chip Off The Old Clark as Rebel Leader
- High Incident (one episode, 1996) - Christmas Blues as Kronsky
- JAG (one episode, 1997) - Cowboys & Cossacks as Russian Communications Officer
- Beverly Hills, 90210 (one episode, 1998) - The Fundamental Things Apply as Alex Veselic
- Ryan Caulfield: Year One (one episode, 1999) - Sex and St. Michael as Lako
- V.I.P. (one episode, 2001) - A.I. Highrise as Vanderwall
- Son of the Beach (one episode, 2001) - From Russia, with Johnson as Sergei
- The Agency (one episode, 2001) - Deadline as Major
- Alias (two episodes, 2002) - The Box: Part 1 and The Box: Part 2 as Endo
- The District (one episode, 2004) - On Guard as Gregor Bukantz
- E-Ring (one episode, 2006) - War Crimes as Ivan
- Gilmore Girls (one episode, 2007) - I'm a Kayak, Hear Me Roar as Stefan
- The Unit (one episode, 2007) - Bedfellows as Customer One
- Raising the Bar (one episode, 2008) - Bagels and Locks as Andrei Markova
- Burn Notice (one episode, 2009) - Friends Like These as Milovan Dragas
- Gigantic (one episode, 2010) - Pilot: Part 2 as Gustav
- Nikita (one episode, 2010) - 2: 2.0 as Mirko Dadich
- Undercovers (one episode, 2010) - Crashed as Borz
- Scandal (one episode, 2012) - Sweet Baby as Polish Ambassador
- Intelligence (one episode, 2014) - The Grey Hat as Torbin Salvi
- House of Cards (one episode, 2015) - Chapter 32 as Boris Litsky
- Agents of S.H.I.E.L.D. (one episode, 2016) - "Parting Shot" as General Androvich
- Zoo (two episodes, 2016) - The Contingency & The Yellow Brick Road as Leonid Ivankov
- Scorpion (one episode, 2017) – Episode #4.2 as Manager Anton Eksteritsky
- Homecoming (two episodes, 2018) -Episode #1.2 and Episode 1.10 as Mr. Heidl
- I Am the Night (one episode, 2019) - "Episode #1.6" as Rachmaninoff
- FBI: Most Wanted (one episode, 2022) - A Man Without a Country as Aleksander Pavlishchev
- Chicago Med (recurring, 2023) as Pawel Wapniarski
