= The Darwin Awards (film) =

- Theatrical release poster
- Directed by: Finn Taylor
- Written by: Finn Taylor
- Produced by: Jason Blum; Debbie Brubaker; Dieter Busch; Frank Capra III
- Starring: Joseph Fiennes; Winona Ryder; David Arquette; Juliette Lewis; Lukas Haas; Juliana Margulies; Chris Penn
- Cinematography: Hiro Narita
- Edited by: Rick LeCompte
- Music by: David Kitay
- Production companies: Blumhouse Productions; WOW Films; Tavistock Pictures
- Distributed by: Metro-Goldwyn-Mayer; Icon Entertainment
- Release dates: January 25, 2006 (Sundance); July 31, 2007
- Running time: 94 minutes
- Country: United States
- Language: English
- Box office: $309,408

The Darwin Awards is a 2006 American adventure comedy film based on the website of the same name written and directed by Finn Taylor, the film premiered January 25, 2006, at the Sundance Film Festival. The film features Joseph Fiennes, Winona Ryder, David Arquette, Juliette Lewis, Wilmer Valderrama, Chris Penn, Julianna Margulies, Robin Tunney, Lawrence Ferlinghetti, Brad Hunt, Adam Savage, Jamie Hyneman and Metallica. This was Penn's last film appearance before his death on January 24, 2006, the day before the film's premiere, and Ryder's first feature film since 2002. The film includes several full and partial re-enactments of "Darwin Awards", the earliest of which were fictitious, most notably the debunked JATO Rocket Car story.

== Plot ==
The film opens with a car with a JATO rocket strapped to it. The movie then shifts to Michael Burrows, a criminal profiler for the San Francisco Police Department. Shot in documentary style, the film is ostensibly a dissertation by a film school graduate that follows Michael throughout the story. Fired from the police force after his hematophobia allows a serial killer to get away, Michael wallows in a deep depression for several weeks before coming up with a way to combine his Darwin Awards obsession with his talent for profiling. He will help insurance companies detect people more likely to accidentally end their own lives, so they are not sold insurance policies. After impressing an insurance company manager with his profiling talent, Michael is paired up with Siri, a specialist in strange insurance cases.

Siri and Michael travel the country on behalf of the company, investigating several legendary examples of stupidity, such as the JATO rocket car. A pair of men attempting to ice fish become frustrated and use a stick of dynamite to blast a hole in the ice. The problem is their dog plays fetch with the lit dynamite and runs it back to their brand-new SUV. As they investigate the cases, Michael tries to pinpoint a common factor for these people. The only explanation is a confused monologue by Siri about insurance companies always denying claims and driving people insane.

Michael narrowly avoids becoming a Darwin Award winner throughout the movie. He and Siri are stranded in the middle of nowhere on a cold night. Desperate for warmth, he attempts to start a fire with gasoline, causing his car to explode. Siri later confronts Michael, accusing him of being obsessed with the Darwin Awards.

A twist of fate leads to Michael discovering where the murder suspect he originally allowed to escape now lives, as he videotapes the man in his home by rappelling down the side of the building. The film school student is seen for the first time as he too is hanging on the side of the building. The problem is his rope is the other end of the same one Michael is dangling by. The stone vase on the roof that the pair is anchored to starts inching closer to the edge. At the same time the serial killer taunts them while slicing open the captive Siri's hand, hoping to trigger Michael's hematophobia. But Michael is able to overcome his fear and defeats the serial killer.

== Cast ==
- Joseph Fiennes as Michael Burrows
- Winona Ryder as Siri Taylor
- David Arquette as Harvey
- Ty Burrell as Emile
- Josh Charles as Paramedic
- Kevin Dunn as Insurance executive
- Nora Dunn as Mrs. Pearlman
- Judah Friedlander as Simon
- Lukas Haas as Farley
- Tom Hollander as Henry
- Brad Hunt as Stan
- Juliette Lewis as Joleen
- Julianna Margulies as Carla
- Tim Blake Nelson as Perp
- Alessandro Nivola as Garry Hoy
- Chris Penn as Tom Andy
- Max Perlich as Bob
- D. B. Sweeney as Detective Maguire
- Robin Tunney as Zoe
- Wilmer Valderrama as NumbNuts
- Tom Wright as Detective
- Adonal Foyle as Detective
- Adam Savage as Military surplus dealer
- Jamie Hyneman as Military surplus dealer
- Richmond Arquette as Mr. Pearlman
- Mickey Breitenstein as Mr. Harris
- Josh Kornbluth as Dentist
- John Doe as Guy in Bar
- Jerry Harrison as Guy in Bar
- Lawrence Ferlinghetti as Himself
- Metallica as Themselves
- Rhett Ramirez as Andy

== International Performance ==
- Europe, Middle East, and Africa

Area	Release Date	Opening	Gross
Italy	01/06/2007	$102,358	$144,009
Spain	13/04/2007	$21,705	$29,471

== Reception ==
The film was poorly received by critics. On Rotten Tomatoes it has a 25% rating based on 12 reviews. Critics typically complained that the film was formulaic and not funny.
