= Summer Night (2019 film) =

2019 film directed by Joseph Cross

- Theatrical release poster
- Directed by: Joseph Cross
- Screenplay by: Jordan Jolliff
- Story by: Jordan Jolliff
- Produced by: Joseph Cross; Tara Ansley; Audrey Tommassini
- Starring: Ellar Coltrane; Ian Nelson; Lio Tipton (Note: Credited as Analeigh Tipton; Tipton came out as non-binary and changed their name in 2021.); Callan McAuliffe; Ella Hunt; Bill Milner; Hayden Szeto; Lana Condor; Elena Kampouris; Melina Vidler; Khris Davis; Victoria Justice; Justin Chatwin
- Cinematography: Michael FitzMaurice
- Edited by: Raymond Wood
- Music by: Dan Krysa
- Production companies: Moving Image Productions; Wanderwell Entertainment; Blackhall Entertainment Ventures
- Distributed by: Samuel Goldwyn Films
- Release dates: April 6, 2019 (ATLFF); July 12, 2019 (United States)
- Running time: 98 minutes
- Country: United States
- Language: English

Summer Night is a 2019 American coming-of-age romantic comedy film directed by Joseph Cross in his directorial debut, from a screenplay by Jordan Jolliff. It stars Ellar Coltrane, Ian Nelson, Lio Tipton, Callan McAuliffe, Ella Hunt, Bill Milner, Hayden Szeto, Lana Condor, Elena Kampouris, Melina Vidler, Khris Davis, Victoria Justice and Justin Chatwin.

It had its world premiere at the Atlanta Film Festival on April 6, 2019 and was released on July 12, 2019, by Samuel Goldwyn Films.

== Plot ==
One summer night, young adults across town meet and prepare for the party at The Alamo, a music venue. They make discoveries about themselves and their relationships with the people around them. This includes best friends Seth and Jameson, Seth’s girlfriend Mel, and her friends Lex and Vanessa. Their friends Taylor and Andy, along with Seth, play music at the Alamo.

Mel finds out she's pregnant, and her two best friends, Lexi and Vanessa, console her at their house. In a phone call to her friend Jack, Lexi admits she slept with a groomsman at her sister's wedding. While driving through town, Jameson asks Seth about their relationship. When Seth refuses to tell him, Jameson drives over to Mel's house, where Vanessa is outside. Seth, hidden from Vanessa, hears her tell Jameson to tell Seth to call Mel so they can talk.

Jameson arrives at the house of Andy, a friend and local bartender at the Alamo. They talk about Jameson's date that night with partier Harmony and his on-and-off relationship with Corin. Rabbit shows up and tells the two that Lexi slept with someone. Jameson and Andy console him about his crush on Lexi.

In the woods, two men jump Taylor on his bike ride. He clambers through the woods before finding Dana, the younger sister of one of his friends. Dana helps him into town and bandages his wounds. Taylor invites Dana to see him play that night at the Alamo.

Seth visits Mel to talk about their baby, not offering any opinion on what to do. When Seth interrupts their conversation to return a text, Mel angrily tells him to leave. Outside the Alamo, Seth admits to his bandmate and friend Caleb that Mel's pregnant. Taylor arrives with his guitar and all three enter the Alamo.

Harmony drives Jameson to the Alamo. At the Alamo, Seth and his band start playing. Taylor finds Dana in the line into the Alamo. At the house, Vanessa decides to go to the Alamo while Mel and Lexi decide to stay in. Mel notices that Taylor, Vanessa's crush, is back in town.

At the door to the Alamo, Corin, working as the ticket-seller, asks Jameson to talk after she gets off from work. Jameson pays for both him and Harmony, revealing to Corin that they're on a date. During the performance, Jameson and Harmony drink and talk about Jameson’s past with Corin and their futures.

Rabbit arrives at the Alamo and talks to Luke, a dad and friend, about Lexi. Luke tells Rabbit not to get mad at Lexi since they're not in a relationship.

Vanessa enters the Alamo and approaches the stage, where Taylor and Dana are talking. Vanessa greets Dana harshly, and Taylor interrupts by introducing Andy's band.

Harmony goes out to answer a phone call. On the way back in, she asks Corin if she's interested in Jameson. Corin lies and tells Harmony no.

Seth goes outside to ask Luke for father advice. Mel and Lexi decide to go to the Alamo, where Taylor's band has started playing. After they arrive, Rabbit blows off Lexi when she wants to talk. After Taylor's band finishes up, everyone leaves the Alamo to go to LaSalles, a local bar.

When Harmony asks Jameson to come over, she realizes he still has some interest in Corin. She tells him to call her when he's figured out what he wants. Outside of Alamo's, Luke tells Rabbit to not be dumb about Lexi while Jameson asks Corin to talk later. Taylor convinces Dana to go to LaSalles, even though Dana isn't twenty-one yet. Vanessa interrupts their conversation to take a picture with Taylor. Taylor pulls away, leading Dana away.

Outside of the Alamo, Mel and Seth argue over the baby. Seth decides to have a drink with his friends while Mel decides to go home. Lexi and Rabbit walk Mel back.

Taylor and Dana enter LaSalles through a side door and begin to dance. Vanessa sees them and tells the bouncer that Dana isn't twenty-one. At the bar, Seth reveals to Jameson that Mel is pregnant. Jameson tells Seth to go to Mel as Corin and Andy enter the bar. Corin tells Jameson she wants to escape their slow town. Taylor and Dana leave after the bartender asks for Dana's ID. While walking back, Taylor and Dana go swimming in the river and they kiss.

Jameson walks Corin home. After revealing that Jameson admitted his feelings for her at her past birthday party, they talk. While Jameson likes his life how it is, Corin realizes she's not content with the life she currently lives, and thinks that Jameson should be too. Jameson leaves after Corin tells him that he's messing up how her should be.

At the house, Rabbit and Lexi talk in the kitchen. Lexi admits that she wants to be with Rabbit, and they kiss. Mel catches Seth as he tries to sneak into the house. In her room, Seth apologizes for being a bad boyfriend. They sit in bed and talk about the baby before going to sleep.

Jameson, Andy, and Rabbit go to Caleb’s house, where they drink and talk about their days.

The next day, the four wake up and go to the coffeeshop that Dana works at. After she serves them, Taylor enters and gives her a flower.

== Cast ==
- Ellar Coltrane as Jameson Ford
- Ian Nelson as Seth
- Lio Tipton as Mel
- Callan McAuliffe as Taylor Peters
- Ella Hunt as Dana
- Hayden Szeto as Caleb Grass
- Lana Condor as Lexi
- Elena Kampouris as Corin
- Bill Milner as Jack "Rabbit"
- Melina Vidler as Vanessa
- Khris Davis as Luke
- Victoria Justice as Harmony James
- Justin Chatwin as Andy

== Production ==
In October 2017, it was announced Ellar Coltrane, Lio Tipton, Justin Chatwin and Elena Kampouris had joined the film's cast, with Joseph Cross directing from his screenplay with Jordan Joliff. In November 2017, it was announced Callan McAuliffe, Ian Nelson, Hayden Szeto, Lana Condor, Bill Milner, Melina Vidler, Ella Hunt and Victoria Justice were also set to star, with James Ponsoldt as an executive producer.

Principal photography began in Atlanta, Georgia on October 20, 2017 and concluded on November 11, 2017 in Newnan, Georgia.

== Release ==
In December 2018, it was announced that Samuel Goldwyn Films had acquired U.S. distribution rights to the film, with a planned release for spring 2019. The movie had its world premiere at the Atlanta Film Festival on April 6, 2019. It was released in Theaters and VOD July 12, 2019.

=== Critical reception ===
Summer Night holds a 55% approval rating on review aggregator website Rotten Tomatoes, based on 22 reviews, with an average of 5.3/10. On Metacritic, the film holds a rating of 49 out of 100, based on 7 critics, indicating "mixed or average reviews".
