= In the Cloud =

2018 American science fiction film

- Directed by: Robert Scott Wildes
- Screenplay by: Vanya Asher
- Produced by: Tim Kring; Brian Kavanaugh-Jones; Justin Levy; Dan Friedkin; Bradley Thomas; Jillian Apfelbaum; Chris Goble; Robert Scott Wildes
- Starring: Justin Chatwin; Adetomiwa Edun; Nora Arnezeder; Laura Fraser; Gabriel Byrne; Charlie Carver; Max Carver
- Cinematography: Wes Cardino
- Edited by: Chris Walldorf
- Production companies: Automatik Entertainment; Imperative Entertainment; Little Island Productions
- Distributed by: Crackle
- Release date: February 8, 2018
- Running time: 90 minutes
- Country: United States
- Language: English

In the Cloud is a 2018 American sci-fi thriller film directed by Robert Scott Wildes and written by Vanya Asher, starring Justin Chatwin, Adetomiwa Edun, Nora Arnezeder and Gabriel Byrne. The film is an original production by Crackle.

== Cast ==
- Justin Chatwin as Halid 'Hale' Begovic
- Adetomiwa Edun as Theo Jones
- Nora Arnezeder as Suzanna (Z)
- Laura Fraser as Mary Klaxon
- Gabriel Byrne as Doc Wolff
- Charlie Carver as Jude
- Max Carver as Caden
- Daniel Portman as Max Kavinsky
- Ali Cook as Paul Avalon
- Sean Power as Robert
- Emmett J. Scanlan as Alfie
- Rosie Cavaliero as Sandra Bullington
- Aleksander Mikic as Soldier / Tata
- Sam Attwater as Rupert
- Maya Barcot as Mama

== Production ==
=== Casting ===
On September 20, 2017, the film's cast was announced which included Nora Arnezeder, Gabriel Byrne, Justin Chatwin, Tomiwa Edun, and Laura Fraser.

=== Filming ===
The film was shot in Manchester. Principal photography began on August 22, 2017, and ended on September 17.

== Release ==
The film premiered on Crackle on February 8, 2018.

== Reception ==
David Bianculli, writing for TV Worth Watching, said, "It plays as derivatively as it sounds, but there is one reason, behind Byrne, to watch: One of his co-stars is Laura Fraser, who played Lydia the Stevia lover on Breaking Bad."
