= No Stranger Than Love =

- Theatrical release poster
- Directed by: Nick Wernham
- Written by: Steve Adams
- Produced by: Paul Fler
- Starring: Alison Brie; Colin Hanks; Justin Chatwin; Dylan Everett; Terry Jones
- Cinematography: Michael LeBlanc
- Edited by: Michelle Szemberg
- Music by: Geoff Zanelli
- Production companies: Pangaea Pictures; Innis Lake Entertainment
- Distributed by: Orion Pictures; Momentum Pictures
- Release dates: April 30, 2015 (NBFF); June 17, 2016
- Running time: 89 minutes
- Country: Canada
- Language: English

No Stranger Than Love is a 2015 Canadian romantic comedy film directed by Nick Wernham and written by Steve Adams. The film stars Alison Brie, Justin Chatwin and Colin Hanks. The film was released on June 17, 2016, in a limited release and through video on demand by Orion Pictures. Soundtrack includes: John Lee Hooker and Award winning, Canadian Country Music Singer/Songwriter, Rik Reese

== Plot summary ==
Lucy Sherrington (Alison Brie), a high school art teacher living in a small town, is romantically pursued by every male she knows including students and the high school principal. Lucy turns them down because she is contemplating having an affair with the married high school football coach, Clint Coburn (Colin Hanks). In order to reassure Lucy, who is having doubts about their relationship, Clint vows not to have sex with her until she tells him she loves him. Lucy reluctantly tells him she loves him, however immediately after a black hole opens in the floor of Lucy's living room sucking in Clint.

== Cast ==
- Alison Brie as Lucy Sherrington
- Justin Chatwin as Rydell Whyte
- Colin Hanks as Clint Coburn
- Dylan Everett as Alex
- Terry Jones as Howard
- Aaron Poole as Jamie Whyte
- Jayne Eastwood as Brenda
- Barry Flatman as Elliot Sherrington
- Sabrina Grdevich as Nancy
- Mark Forward as Vernon Paulson
- Jonathan Potts as John Linnehan
- Robin Brûlé as Verna Coburn
- Martin Roach as Sheriff Deputy
- Lisa Berry as Fay

== Production ==
In June 2013, it was announced Alison Brie, Justin Chatwin and Colin Hanks will star in the film, with Nick Wernham directing from a screenplay by Steve Adams. Paul Fler will serve as producer, while Fred Roos, Jeffrey Latimer, Richard Wernham and Simon Wernham will serve as executive producers under their Innis Lake Entertainment and Pangaea Pictures banners, respectively.

Principal photography began on May 27, 2013, in Toronto, and concluded on July 5, 2013.

== Release ==
The romantic comedy premiered at the Newport Beach Film Festival on April 30, 2015, as the closing night film. It was also the closing night film at Skyway Film Festival on June 14. On June 17, 2016, the film was released in select theaters in Canada, distributed by Entertainment One. On the same day, it was also released in the United States in a limited release and through video on demand by Orion Pictures and Momentum Pictures.

== Critical response ==
On review aggregator Rotten Tomatoes, the film holds an approval rating of 7% based on 14 reviews, with an average rating of 3.57/10. On Metacritic, the film has a score of 29 out of 100, based on 8 critics. Leslie Felperin of The Hollywood Reporter gave the film a negative review writing: "It's not a problem there's a hole, as it were, in the common-sense logic of the film's world; it's that there's a big, gaping hole where the illogic should be, a whole lot of nothing where there should be metaphor, playfulness, all that juicy, enigmatic, magical-realism stuff that helps films like Being John Malkovich and its many knockoffs become fodder for film-studies essays."
