= Minhal Baig =

American film director

- Born: Chicago, Illinois
- Citizenship: American
- Occupations: Film writer and director
- Years active: 2015-present
- Notable work: Hala
- Children: 1

Minhal Baig (/ˈmɪnhɑːl ˈbeɪɡ/) is an American director, producer, and writer from Chicago, Illinois. She has written and directed three films, 1 Night, Hala and We Grown Now, and written for the television shows Ramy and Bojack Horseman.

== Early life ==
Minhal Baig was born and raised in Roger's Park, Chicago to Pakistani-born parents with her brother and sister. She attended Northside College Prep high school. She spent her early years engrossing herself in cinema by seeing Bollywood films at her local movie theater. She moved to Los Angeles in 2017 to pursue her career in film writing and film making.

== Career ==
Her first film, 1 Night, starring Anna Camp, premiered at Austin Film Festival on October 14, 2016, to mixed reviews. "Between its original premise and the movie's strong visuals, Baig proves that she's a director and writer to watch in the future, even if there's room to grow in the present" said the Los Angeles Times.

After moving to Los Angeles, she struggled for a year and a half to find directing jobs as a woman of color. She joined a diversity program through Ryan Murphy's HALF foundation, where she received an endorsement for membership into the Directors Guild of America.

Throughout this time, she was editing her first feature film, Hala, based on a short film of the same name she had released in 2016. Hala is not an autobiography, but Baig drew from her life experiences for the themes of the film. It was filmed in the Rogers Park neighborhood in Chicago, near where Baig grew up. Some scenes were shot in Northside College Prep highschool.

Jada Pinkett Smith became an executive producer on Hala after watching the short film and becoming personally attached. The film was picked up by Smith's production studio Overbrook Entertainment. "I'm about walking the walk," Jada Pinkett Smith (executive producer) said to Variety Sundance studio presented by AT&T. "And that's one of the reasons why part of my work has been helping artists like Minhal [Baig] and flowing resources to artists like herself."

After premiering at Sundance Film Festival in 2019, Hala received an offer from Apple TV+ to release the film on their new streaming service. The film was Apple's first purchase at Sundance 2019. Hala was released for a limited two-week in November 2019, and was released fully on Apple TV+ on December 6, 2019. Hala was reviewed by Soraya Nadia McDonald on NPR, who said that "The film shines with a glorious commitment to the emotional evolution of its female characters, which James Sizemore's score accents with notes of subtle agony."

She's also worked in television, writing for the first season of the Hulu television show Ramy, as well as the final season of BoJack Horseman. After being a writer on the first season of Ramy, Baig claims that every female writer on the show's staff was asked to not return for the second season. In a tweet that has since been taken down, Baig claimed, "I was not asked to return for the 2nd season on a show that had a critically acclaimed first season. And none of the other women on staff were asked back either. Who did get asked back? The male office PA and a male EP w/no previous writing experience. #NotWorthLess."

For Bojack Horseman, Baig wrote Season 6, Episode 6, "The Kidney Stays in the Picture." Raphael Bob-Waksberg, creator of Bojack Horseman, asked Baig to come write for the show after seeing Hala and being impressed. The episode featured multiple jokes at the expense of Chicago, Baig's hometown.

In 2023, Baig directed, produced, and wrote, We Grown Now which had its world premiere at the 2023 Toronto International Film Festival in September 2023.

In 2021, she signed an overall deal with Amazon.

== Filmography ==
=== Films ===
Feature films
Year	Title	Director	Writer	Distributor
2016	1 Night	Yes	Yes	levelFILM
2019	Hala	Yes	Yes	Apple TV
2023	We Grown Now	Yes	Yes	Sony Pictures Classics

Short films
Year	Title	Director	Writer
2016	Hala	Yes	Yes

=== Television ===
Year	Title	Producer	Writer	Notes
2019	Ramy	No	Yes	Season 1, episode 3: "A Black Spot on the Heart"
2019	Bojack Horseman	No	Yes	Season 6, episode 6: "The Kidney Stays in the Picture"
2027	Criminal	Yes	Yes	
