= Dream with the Fishes =

- Directed by: Finn Taylor
- Screenplay by: Finn Taylor
- Story by: Finn Taylor; Jeffrey D. Brown
- Starring: David Arquette; Kathryn Erbe; J. E. Freeman; Brad Hunt; Patrick McGaw; Cathy Moriarty
- Production company: 3 Ring Circus Films
- Distributed by: Sony Pictures Classics
- Release dates: January 25, 1997 (Sundance); June 20, 1997 (United States)
- Running time: 97 minutes
- Country: United States
- Language: English
- Budget: $1 million
- Box office: $543,708

Dream with the Fishes is a 1997 American comedy-drama film written and directed by Finn Taylor in his directorial debut, and starring David Arquette, Kathryn Erbe, Brad Hunt, and Cathy Moriarty. It was released on June 20, 1997, by Sony Pictures Classics.

== Plot ==
Terry, a young, depressed, widowed attorney and voyeur, attempts to commit suicide by jumping off the San Francisco–Oakland Bay Bridge. He is stopped by Nick, a man he encountered earlier in a convenience store, and whose fiancé, Liz, Terry frequently spies on through the couple's apartment window. Nick introduces Terry to Liz before offering Terry a lethal dose of sleeping pills. After ingesting them, Terry suddenly regrets his decision and begins to panic. Nick drops him off at the hospital, where Terry learns the pills were only multivitamins.

An angry Terry tracks Nick to another hospital, where he learns that Nick is terminally ill and only has weeks to live. Nick and Terry begin a quick friendship, and Nick offers to make Terry the sole beneficiary of his life insurance policy if Terry helps him live out his dying wishes. Terry rejects the proposition until Nick indicates that, in the end, if Terry is still suicidal by the end, Nick will kill him.

Nick accompanies Terry on several of his escapades, including bowling naked with two women in a bowling alley. Nick attempts to try heroin for the first time, but Terry convinces him that the two should do LSD instead. Later, a psychic directs them to visit an aquarium. Due to Terry's dedication to Nick's plans, Nick offers to indulge in one of Terry's fantasies; Terry takes Nick to a rooftop to spy on apartment windows with binoculars. Later that night, Nick convinces Terry to accompany him to a pharmacy where he commits robbery.

Liz is infuriated when Nick and Terry resurface after a five-day bender, finding them staying in Nick's hometown north of the city with his Aunt Elise. Accompanied by Terry and Liz, Nick makes a visit to his estranged parents nearby and reconnects with his father. Elise and Liz attempt to keep Nick's ex-girlfriend, Mary, from contacting him. Terry disagrees with this, and facilitates a meeting for the two.

Nick grows increasingly volatile, and attempts a bank robbery before Terry brings him to the hospital. Terry ultimately euthanizes Nick by injecting a lethal overdose of medication into his IV. After Nick's funeral, Terry digs up his cremains and throws them off the San Francisco–Oakland Bay Bridge. Later, he approaches a woman in his neighborhood on the sidewalk, returning a watch she lost on the bus the year prior. He admits to her that he had been watching and photographing her, but apologizes and promises to never do so again.

== Cast ==
- David Arquette as Terry
- Kathryn Erbe as Liz
- Brad Hunt as Nick Ambrosio
- Cathy Moriarty as Aunt Elise
- J. E. Freeman as Joe Ambrosio
- Patrick McGaw as Don
- Timi Prulhiere as Michelle
- Anita Barone as Mary
- Allyce Beasley as Sophia Ambrosio
- Peter Gregory as Pharmacist
- Richmond Arquette as Sheriff

== Production ==
Taylor has claimed that the film is loosely autobiographical. Taylor himself once spent six years traveling around the country with a friend. In one interview, Taylor claimed: "When I was 19, I contemplated suicide and attempted to hold up a drug store."

It was shot in San Francisco and in other locations around Northern California.

== Release and reception ==
Dream with the Fishes debuted at the Sundance Film Festival, and was picked up by Sony's indie division Sony Pictures Classics. It would go on to earn $460,000 in limited release in June 1997. In Australia, it also received a limited theatrical release in October 1997. It had earlier been shown in Australia at the Melbourne International Film Festival on August 4, 1997.

The film received a relatively positive reception from critics, with Rotten Tomatoes giving the film a rating of 61% based on 44 reviews. Roger Ebert stated in June 1997 that the film "shows some of the signs of unchained ambition." The Los Angeles Times said that "of all the towering blockbusters this summer, Dream With The Fishes has more heart than the lot of them." Dan Webster of The Spokesman-Review commented in August 1997 that Dream with the Fishes is "a perfect example of the kind of personal film that won’t necessarily connect with a larger audience." He added that it is "told with a sensitivity that, while not exactly Oscar-worthy, does manage to touch on feelings most mainstream films don’t even admit exist."

Dennis Harvey of Variety labelled it a "a flat-out imitation of some more adventurous strains in ’70s U.S. cinema", noting that the film "ends up looking wholly original in the current indie landscape" because of this. Dream with the Fishes was included in Magill's Cinema Annual 1998: A Survey of the Films of 1997, which also noted its similarities to 1970s American cinema. The book states that, "Dream with the Fishes pays homage to '70s films like Dealing (1971), The Last Detail (1973) and California Split (1974), with unapologetic substance abuse, retro costumes, and characters who drop out of the mainstream on their way to enlightenment." The book further added that, "Taylor gives the picture a stark and distinctive visual style and the film stock itself was processed to further imitate the grainy, color-saturated look of '70s cinema."

In a 2007 interview, actor David Arquette stated that Dream with the Fishes was "close to my heart" and "a great independent film." In celebration of the film's 25th anniversary, it had a special screening at the Smith Rafael Film Center in San Rafael, California on October 17, 2022. This screening used a new hi-res master. In December 2022, the film was also released on Blu-ray for the first time by Sony Pictures Home Entertainment, having previously only been available on VHS and DVD.
