= 1 Night (film) =

- Directed by: Minhal Baig
- Written by: Minhal Baig
- Produced by: Hans Canosa; Kerry Barden; Marius A. Markevicius; Han West; Zilvinas Naujokas; Sean Vawter
- Starring: Anna Camp; Justin Chatwin; Isabelle Fuhrman; Kyle Allen
- Cinematography: Jesse M. Feldman
- Edited by: Jonathan M. Dillon
- Music by: Sean Giddings
- Production companies: Sorrento Productions; Canosa Productions; Meridian Content
- Distributed by: Level 33 Entertainment; LevelFILM
- Release dates: October 14, 2016 (AFF); February 10, 2017 (Theatrical release)
- Running time: 80 minutes
- Country: United States
- Language: English

1 Night is a 2016 American romantic drama film written and directed by Minhal Baig. It stars Anna Camp, Justin Chatwin, Isabelle Fuhrman and Kyle Allen.

== Cast ==
- Alexander Roberts as Waitor
- Anna Camp as Elizabeth
- Evan Hofer as Dave
- Isabelle Fuhrman as Bea
- Justin Chatwin as Andrew "Drew" McFarland
- Kelli Berglund as Rachel
- Kyle Allen as Andrew "Andy" McFarland
- Roshon Fegan as Henry

== Production ==
The film was shot in Los Angeles over a period of 16 days. Principal photography began on September 25, 2014, and ended on October 11, 2014.

== Release ==
The film had its world premiere at the Austin Film Festival on October 14, 2016. Independent distributors Level 33 Entertainment and LevelFILM released the film in select theaters and through video on demand on February 10, 2017 in the US and Canada.

== Critical reception ==
1 Night received mostly negative reviews from critics. On Rotten Tomatoes the film holds a 20% rating, based on 5 reviews, with an average rating of 4.2/10. John DeFore of The Hollywood Reporter gave the film a negative review stating that: "The writing/directing debut of Minhal Baig enlists experienced actors but has little idea what to do with them, making a hash of its intended meditation on the compromises required by long-term relationships."
