= The Incredible Mrs. Ritchie =

2003 television film

- Written by: Paul Johansson
- Directed by: Paul Johansson
- Starring: Gena Rowlands; Kevin Zegers; Leslie Hope; Cameron Daddo; James Caan; Justin Chatwin
- Music by: Patrick Hawes
- Country of origin: Canada
- Original language: English

Production
- Producer: Michael Frislev
- Cinematography: Paul Sarossy
- Editor: Eddie Hamilton
- Running time: 102 minutes
- Production company: Showtime Networks

Original release
- Network: Showtime
- Release: July 12, 2003

The Incredible Mrs. Ritchie is a 2003 Canadian made-for-television drama film directed by Paul Johansson. It premiered on Showtime on July 12, 2003.

== Cast ==
- Gena Rowlands as Evelyn Ritchie
- Kevin Zegers as Charlie Proud
- Leslie Hope as Joan Proud
- David Schofield as Sonny Proud
- Cameron Daddo as Jim
- James Caan as Harry Dewitt
- Justin Chatwin as Lawrence
- Anna Van Hooft as Samantha
- Paul Johansson as Jack
- Brenda James as Virginia
- Jeremy Raymond as Stanley

== Release ==
The film premiered on Showtime on July 12, 2003, followed by a DVD release in the U.S. on March 30, 2004.

As of 2025, it is not available to stream on Paramount Plus via its Paramount+ with SHOWTIME plan.

== Awards and nominations ==
List of awards and nominations received by The Incredible Mrs. Ritchie
Award	Category	Nominee	Result
Daytime Emmy Award	Outstanding Directing in a Children/Youth/Family Special	Paul Johansson	Nominated
Daytime Emmy Award	Outstanding Performer in a Children/Youth/Family Special	James Caan	Nominated
Daytime Emmy Award	Outstanding Performer in a Children/Youth/Family Special	Gena Rowlands	Won
Daytime Emmy Award	Outstanding Children/Youth/Family Special	Nick Cassavetes, Chad Oakes, Michael Frislev, Jana Edelbaum, Walter Josten and Philip Alberstat	Won
Daytime Emmy Award	Outstanding Writing in a Children/Youth/Family Special	Paul Johansson	Won
