= Taking Lives (novel) =

1999 novel by Michael Pye

- Hardcover edition
- Author: Michael Pye
- Language: English
- Genre: Thriller
- Publisher: Alfred A. Knopf; Vintage Books
- Publication date: February 22, 1999 (hardcover); February 24, 2004 (paperback)
- Publication place: United States
- Media type: Print, Kindle
- Pages: 304
- ISBN: 978-1-4000-7573-7
- OCLC: 39347078
- Dewey Decimal: 823/.914 21
- LC Class: PR6066.Y4 T35 1999

Taking Lives is a 1999 thriller novel by Michael Pye about an FBI profiler in search of a serial killer who assumes the identities of his victims. The novel was loosely adapted into a 2004 film of the same title starring Angelina Jolie and Ethan Hawke.

== Plot ==
A Dutch teenager, Martin Arkenhout, and an American college student, Seth Goodman, strike up a conversation on a bus in Florida, and on a whim they rent a car to better explore the rural area. But then the car breaks down and Goodman, trying to summon help on the roadside, is struck by a passing car and left critically injured. Arkenhout bludgeons Goodman with a rock, switches their wallets and papers, and continues Goodman's journey to college in New York. Arkenhout soon must give up the identity when Goodman's suspicious parents demand he comes home for Christmas. He has by now developed a taste for wealth and luxury, and so begins befriending and killing rich people, stealing their identities and living their comfortable lives for as long as he can before moving on.

The novel shifts over to James Costa, a museum curator who arranges to meet with an art professor named Hart, Arkenhout's assumed identity. Costa wrestles with his troubled but passionate marriage, and is disturbed by his father's sudden decision to leave England and return to the family's former village in Portugal. When Costa and Arkenhout, still posing as Hart, cross paths, Arkenhout is unaware that the real Hart had stolen rare manuscripts from a British museum. Costa, representing the museum, pursues the man he believes to be Hart as far as Portugal hoping to regain the missing manuscripts. As fate would have it, Arkenhout takes a vacation villa near the village where Costa's father had only just died.

While settling family business and attempting to negotiate for the manuscripts, Costa makes increasingly unnerving discoveries about the identities of Hart and Arkenhout, and about his own father's involvement in political oppression during World War II.

== Film adaptation ==
The novel was loosely adapted into a film in 2004 starring Angelina Jolie and Ethan Hawke. The film takes place in Montreal, Quebec City, and rural Pennsylvania in the United States. Several plot points, such as the subplot with Costa's father, are removed.
