= Taking Lives (film) =

2004 film directed by D. J. Caruso

- Theatrical release poster
- Directed by: D. J. Caruso
- Written by: Jon Bokenkamp (Note: Uncredited revisions by Nicholas Kazan, Hilary Seitz and David Ayer.)
- Based on: Taking Lives by Michael Pye
- Produced by: Mark Canton; Bernie Goldman
- Starring: Angelina Jolie; Ethan Hawke; Kiefer Sutherland; Olivier Martinez; Tchéky Karyo; Jean-Hugues Anglade; Gena Rowlands
- Cinematography: Amir Mokri
- Edited by: Anne V. Coates
- Music by: Philip Glass
- Production companies: Village Roadshow Pictures; Atmosphere Pictures
- Distributed by: Warner Bros. Pictures
- Release date: March 19, 2004
- Running time: 103 minutes 109 minutes (director's cut)
- Country: United States
- Languages: English; French
- Budget: $45 million
- Box office: $65.4 million

Taking Lives is a 2004 American psychological thriller film directed by D. J. Caruso and starring Angelina Jolie and Ethan Hawke, with supporting roles by Kiefer Sutherland, Olivier Martinez, Tchéky Karyo, Jean-Hugues Anglade, and Gena Rowlands. Written by Jon Bokenkamp and loosely adapted from the 1999 novel by Michael Pye, the film centers on an enigmatic serial killer who takes on the identities of his victims.

The film was released in the United States on March 19, 2004, by Warner Bros. Pictures. It received generally negative reviews from critics, but was a moderate commercial success.

== Plot ==
In 1983, teenagers Martin Asher and Matt Soulsby meet on a bus to Mont-Laurier, Quebec. The bus breaks down, and the two acquire a car, which soon blows a tire. As Matt changes the tire, Martin comments that they are about the same height and kicks him into the path of an oncoming truck, killing both him and the driver. Taking Matt's guitar and clothes, Martin continues on foot, singing in a voice similar to Matt's.

21 years later, American FBI profiler Illeana Scott is summoned to Montreal by SPVM Inspector LeClair, to assist the local authorities in apprehending a serial killer who assumes his victims’ identities, enabling him to travel undetected across North America.

Illeana interviews art dealer James Costa, an eyewitness to the killer's most recent murder. He makes a drawing of the killer, so the authorities track down the suspect's apartment, finding a decaying corpse chained to the ceiling. Martin's mother, Rebecca, claims to have seen her son, believed dead in Matt's place years earlier, alive on a ferry to Quebec City, leading to the body buried as Martin being exhumed for forensic examination, and he becomes the primary suspect.

At Rebecca's home, Illeana questions her about her son, learning that Martin was an unwanted child who became unstable after the death of his favored twin brother. Illeana finds a hidden passageway behind a cabinet leading to Martin's secret room, where she is attacked by a hidden assailant, who escapes before she can identify him.

Illeana deduces that Asher targets his victims to live as someone different than himself and that his latest target is James after his apartment is ransacked. He is used in a sting operation to lure Asher, but the trap fails.

During a show at his gallery, James is attacked by an assailant, presumed to be Asher, whom Illeana tries to apprehend but loses in the crowd. The police prepare to move James out of town, but he is confronted by the assailant, who attacks him and kills his police escort before driving away with James at gunpoint. Illeana gives chase, causing the car to crash and explode just as James manages to escape.

James visits Illeana's hotel room, where, having grown close over the course of the investigation, they make passionate love surrounded by gruesome crime scene photos. Illeana awakens to find herself covered in James’ blood, but he has merely popped the stitches he received after the car chase.

As James’ stitches are repaired in the hospital, Illeana is called to the morgue, where Rebecca is unable to identify the charred body of the assailant, and Illeana realizes that Asher must still be alive. Before Illeana can reach her, Rebecca enters the elevator and is confronted by James, revealing himself as the real Martin Asher. He kills his mother, and Illeana is shocked to see him covered in blood before the elevator doors close again, and he escapes the hospital.

The police determined that the assailant killed in the car chase was Christopher Hart, a drug addict and art thief to whom Asher owed money. In the struggle in his apartment, Asher killed Hart and staged being taken hostage. Pursued by the police, Asher escapes by train and selects his next victim, taunting Illeana by phone before disappearing. Admitting to having consensual sex with Asher, Illeana is fired from the FBI.

Seven months later, Illeana is living alone in a desolate farmhouse in Carlisle, Pennsylvania, apparently heavily pregnant with Asher's twins. She is confronted by Asher, who declares that they can start over and live together as a family, but Illeana refuses. Enraged, Asher beats her and prepares to choke her into unconsciousness, seizing a pair of scissors from her when she defends herself and stabbing her in the belly.

Illeana stabs Asher in the heart with the same scissors and removes her prosthetic pregnant belly, explaining that the past months were a carefully planned trap. He dies, and Illeana informs LeClair that the ordeal is over.

== Cast ==
- Angelina Jolie as FBI Agent Illeana Scott
- Ethan Hawke as James Costa
- Kiefer Sutherland as Christopher Hart
- Olivier Martinez as SPVM Sgt. Joseph Paquette
- Tchéky Karyo as SPVM Inspector Hugo LeClair
- Jean-Hugues Anglade as SPVM Sgt. Emile Duval
- Paul Dano as Young Martin Asher
- Gena Rowlands as Rebecca Asher
- Justin Chatwin as Matt Soulsby
- Marie-Josée Croze as Medical Examiner
- Henri Pardo as Constable Mann
- Emmanuel Bilodeau as Dr. Finn
- Shawn Roberts as Desk Clerk
- Julien Poulin as SPVQ Inspector
- Christian Tessier as Interrogation Officer
- Billy Two Rivers as Car Salesman

== Production ==
=== Writing ===
The film is based on the novel of the same title by Michael Pye. Numerous hands had a part in the screenplay as script doctors. The cover page of the screenplay credits Jon Bokenkamp with the original draft, Nicholas Kazan with subsequent revisions, Hilary Seitz with more revisions, and David Ayer with the last revisions (to February 28, 2003). The WGA screenwriting credit system ultimately awarded screenplay and adaptation credit to Bokenkamp alone.

=== Casting ===
On April 3, 2001, it was announced that Jennifer Lopez was in negotiations to star in the film, with Tony Scott attached to direct. On September 19, 2002, it was reported that Angelina Jolie and Ethan Hawke were in talks to topline the thriller. Before Jolie was circling the project, Cate Blanchett and Gwyneth Paltrow were approached to play the part. On May 9, 2003, Kiefer Sutherland joined the cast, with D. J. Caruso confirmed to helm the film. On May 21, 2003, Olivier Martinez joined the film, Gena Rowlands being also cast in an unspecified role. Principal photography began that same month in Montreal.

=== Filming locations ===
Filming locations included Old Montreal, Milton Park, Shaughnessy Village, Windsor Station, and the Jacques Cartier Bridge. Shooting coincided with the Montreal International Jazz Festival, where a chase sequence was filmed.

Shooting also took place in Quebec City, utilizing the Château Frontenac and Old Quebec.

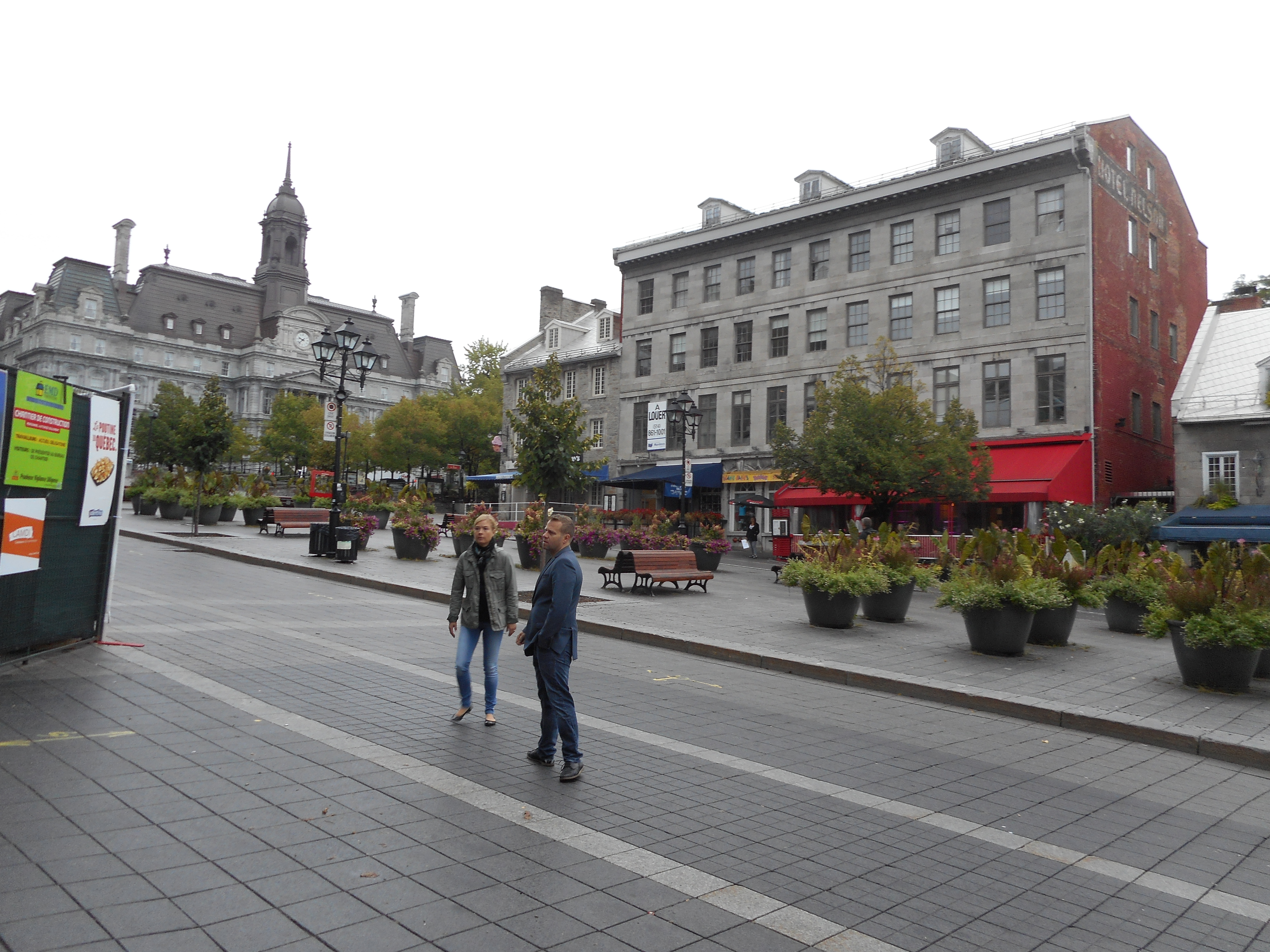
Old Montreal.

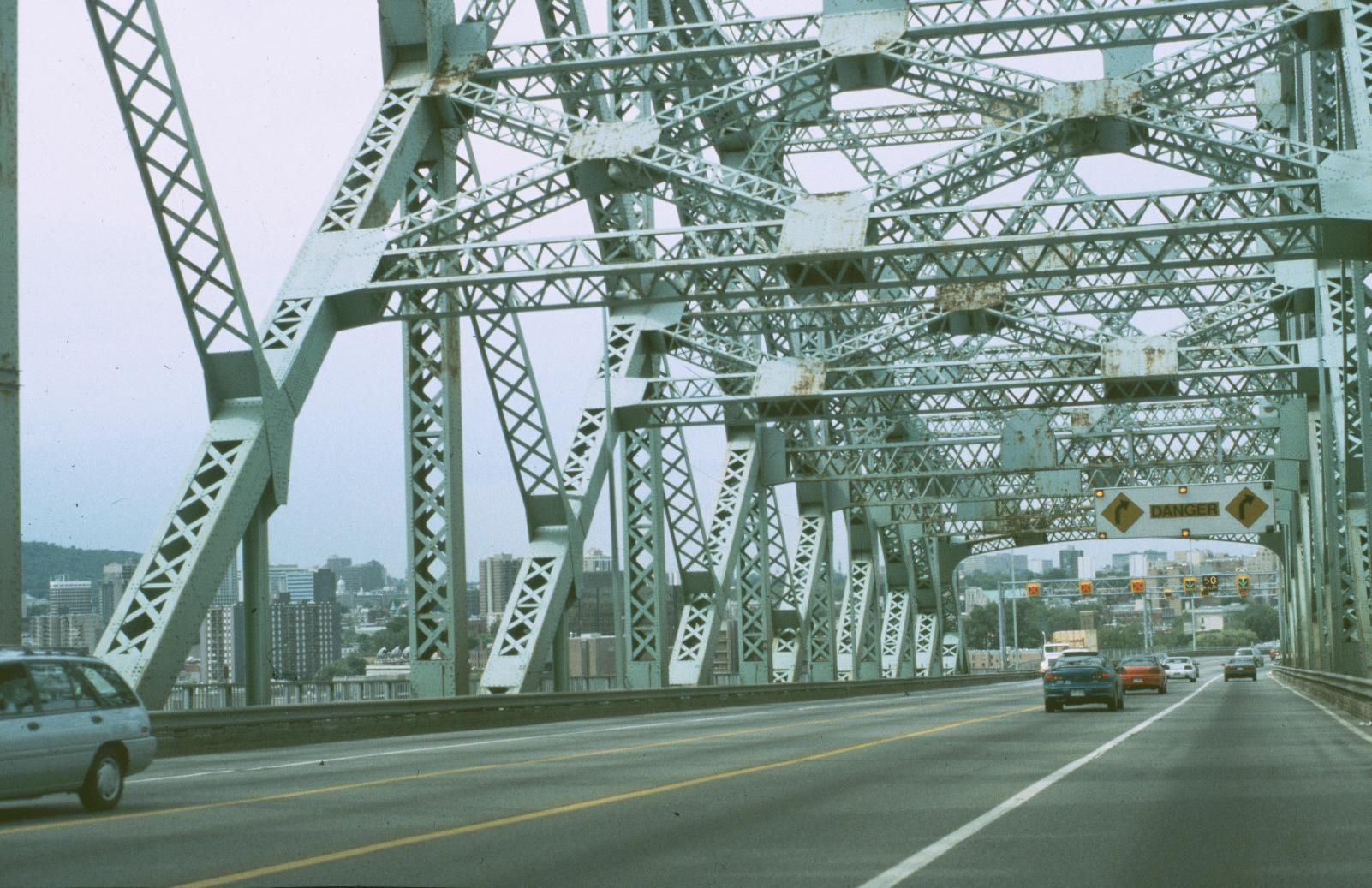
Jacques Cartier Bridge.

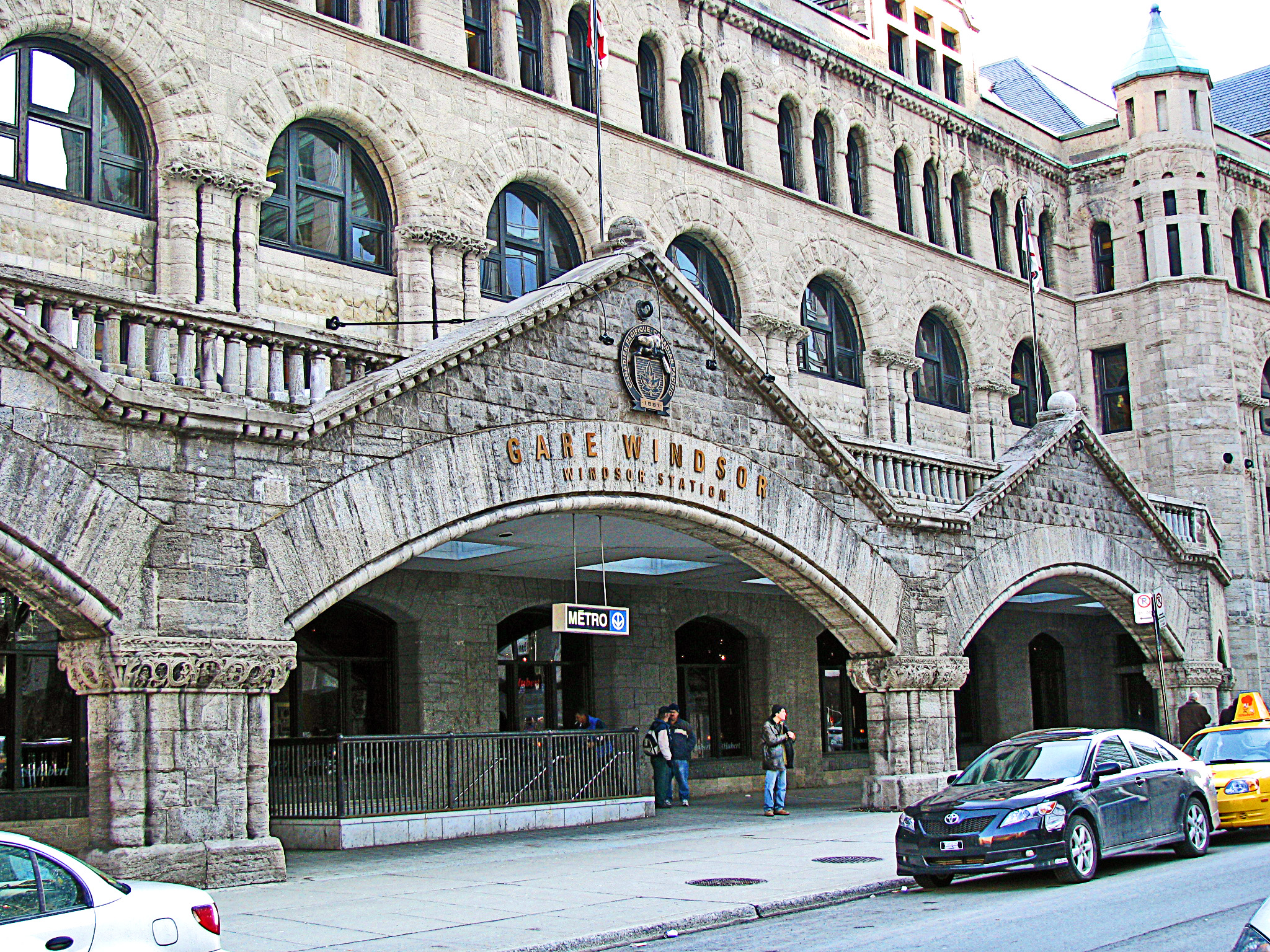
Windsor Station.

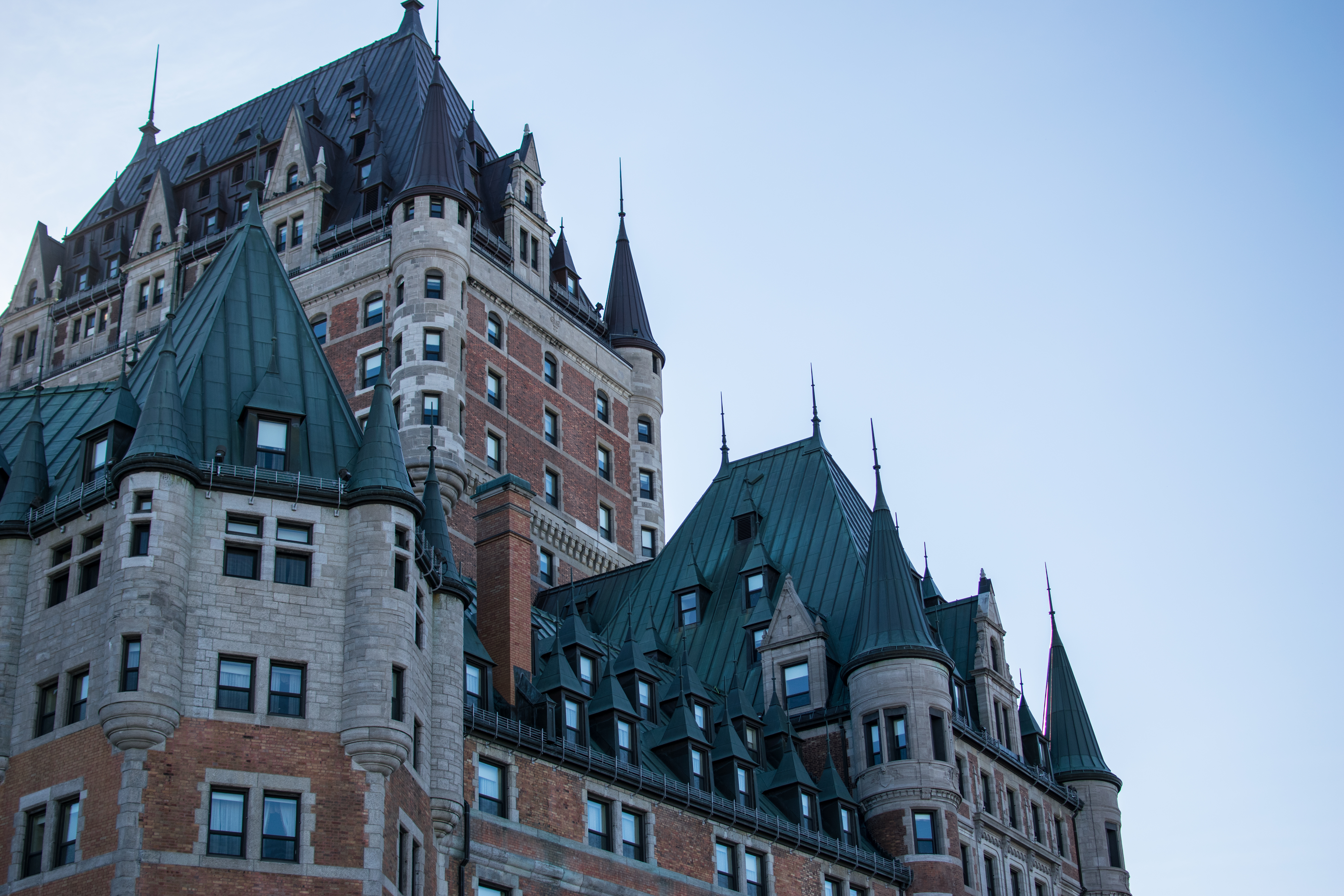
Château Frontenac.

=== Music ===
The original score was composed by Philip Glass and conducted by Michael Riesman. The main title theme ("Shaved") was composed by Walter Werzowa of the electronica group Edelweiss. The U2 song "Bad" is heavily featured throughout the film.

== Release ==
=== Director's cut ===
An unrated director's cut of the film was released on DVD,VHS and Blu-Ray, which runs approximately six minutes longer than the theatrical cut. The extended footage includes more nudity during the sex scene, and a much bloodier death scene for Rebecca Asher (who is beheaded as opposed to being shot).

== Reception ==
=== Box office ===
Taking Lives grossed $32,682,342 in the United States and $65,470,529 worldwide.

=== Critical response ===
The film has received mostly poor reviews; Rotten Tomatoes gives the film a score of 22% based on reviews from 157 critics. The site's consensus states: "A stylish, but predictable thriller where the only thrills are offered by the sensuous Angelina Jolie." Audiences polled by CinemaScore gave the film an average grade of "B" on an A+ to F scale.

Total Film gave it two stars out of five with the verdict: "Starting off well but rapidly losing its way, Taking Lives is more serial-killer flick than serial killer -- we've been fed this mush a thousand times." Antonia Quirke for The Standard called it as "a foolish thriller full of actors who deserve better." Peter T. Chattaway for Christianity Today wrote "The film's villain may take fictitious lives, but the film itself takes up real time that could be spent on better things." David Noh for Film Journal International wrote "Caruso sets up an initially intriguing premise, however gruesome, that unfortunately devolves into a welter of aimlessness, too many red herrings and B-movie hammy performances."

In a more positive review, Roger Ebert gave it three out of four stars, describing it as "an effective thriller, on its modest but stylish level". Todd McCarthy for Variety likewise praised the film, calling it a "Somber, absorbing thriller that treads familiar psycho serial killer terrain with style." Brent Simon for Entertainment Tonight called it "a labyrinthine serial killer thriller that won't win admirers for its intellect, but does have sustenance of mood in spades."

In a 2012 interview with The Guardian, Ethan Hawke called the film "terrible".

=== Awards and nominations ===
Angelina Jolie earned a Golden Raspberry Award nomination for Worst Actress for her performance in the movie (also for Alexander), but lost the trophy to Halle Berry for Catwoman.
