= Unleashed (2016 film) =

Film by Finn Taylor

- Directed by: Finn Taylor
- Written by: Finn Taylor
- Produced by: Susan Johnson; James Huntsman; Todd Slater; Jonathan M. Black; Jennifer Goshay
- Starring: Kate Micucci; Justin Chatwin; Steve Howey; Sean Astin; Hana Mae Lee; Illeana Douglas
- Cinematography: Richard Wong
- Edited by: Rick LeCompte
- Music by: Mark Orton
- Production company: Braveart Films
- Distributed by: Level 33 Entertainment
- Release dates: October 12, 2016 (MVFF); August 25, 2017 (Theatrical release)
- Running time: 96 minutes
- Country: United States
- Language: English
- Budget: $1 million

Unleashed is a 2016 American romantic comedy film written and directed by Finn Taylor and starring Kate Micucci, Justin Chatwin, Steve Howey, Sean Astin, and Hana Mae Lee.

== Synopsis ==
When a cosmic event turns Emma's dog Summit and cat Ajax into two perfect guys, Emma reconsiders her outlook on dating, hilariously works out her trust issues, and ultimately learns to love herself.

== Cast ==
- Kate Micucci as Emma
- Justin Chatwin as Diego / Ajax
- Steve Howey as Sam / Summit
- Sean Astin as Carl
- Hana Mae Lee as Nina
- Josh Brener as Luke
- Illeana Douglas as Monty
- Kathy Garver as Jean
- Scott Coffey as Leather Dude

== Production ==
On June 4, 2015, it was announced Kate Micucci, Justin Chatwin, and Steve Howey signed on for the film. Three weeks later, it was announced Sean Astin, Hana Mae Lee, Josh Brener, and Illeana Douglas joined the cast of the film.

Principal photography began on June 30, 2015, in San Francisco.

== Release ==
The film had its world premiere at the Mill Valley Film Festival on October 12, 2016. Level 33 Entertainment acquired the domestic distribution rights and released the film on August 25, 2017, in select theaters and through video on demand.

== Reception ==
Unleashed received positive reviews from critics. On Rotten Tomatoes, the film holds an 75% rating, based on 8 reviews, with an approval rating of 5/10.

Frank Scheck of The Hollywood Reporter gave the film a positive review writing: "Although it never quite lives up to the satirical possibilities of its high-concept premise, Unleashed delivers some mildly enjoyable laughs thanks to its engaging female lead and the exuberantly physical performances of her co-stars." Barbara Shulgasser-Parker of Common Sense Media rated the film three stars out of five, saying that cast are "greatest charm of the frothy tale lies in its key performances." She, however, also said that the film's plot "biggest problem" is that "juggling her fun interactions with the vivid, outsized personalities of the pets-come-to-human-life against Emma's growing friendship with the steady, less colorful Carl, who watches longingly from the sidelines as the hunky dog-man and the intriguing cat-man 'woo' her." She noted that Kate Micucci's performance called her "sparkle recalls spritely comic actresses of the past," while Illeana Douglas' "resemblance" points out that she is "uncanny, so it's a surprise when Douglas actually shows up in a small role as Emma's boss." Los Angeles Times' Katie Walsh called the film "the most undeniably goofy premise comes along," with actors Chatwin and Howey are "the most valuable players, giving truly inspired physical performances." She also saw that "Micucci's wide-eyed wonder and credulity are indispensable ingredients as well." In conclusion, the film "comes from a wacky, but sincere place, and the stars in Micucci's eyes seem to be contagious."
