= Finn Taylor =

American film writer and director (born 1958)

Finn W. Taylor (born July 4, 1958) is an American film writer and director.

== Background ==
Taylor was born in Oakland, California, and lived in Norway for a few years in his childhood. He attended the University of Montana and later San Francisco State University. He studied poetry and playwriting at San Francisco State before moving into screenwriting in 1993.

Taylor frequently works and produces films in the San Francisco bay area rather than for major studios in Hollywood and Los Angeles. Taylor told the San Francisco Chronicle, "I feel really strongly that I stay based up here. My roots in San Francisco go way back to when I ran a literary series at Intersection for the Arts. I see no reason to work anywhere else." Taylor has also cited the greater creative control and the ability to make unconventional films as a reason for remaining independent. In 1994, Taylor wrote his first feature film, Pontiac Moon.

== Career ==
=== Dream with the Fishes ===
Taylor's directorial debut was in 1997 with Dream with the Fishes. The film follows a suicidal man who forms a friendship with a terminally ill man. Taylor has claimed that the film is loosely autobiographical. Taylor himself once spent six years traveling around the country with a friend. In one interview, Taylor claimed, "When I was 19, I contemplated suicide and attempted to hold up a drug store." The film debuted at the Sundance Film Festival, and would go on to earn $460,000 in limited release. The film also received a relatively positive reception from critics. Roger Ebert said that the film, "shows some of the signs of unchained ambition." The Los Angeles Times said "of all the towering blockbusters this summer, 'Dream With The Fishes' has more heart than the lot of them."

=== Cherish ===
Taylor's next film would be 2002's Cherish, a romantic comedy about a female animator who is implicated in a murder. Taylor conceived the film while studying people under house arrest in the bracelet program. The film is also recognizable for its soundtrack of pop music from the 1970s and 1980s, including Modern English, Soft Cell, The Turtles, and Tom Petty. The film debuted at Sundance and would receive mixed reviews from critics and had mediocre box office success. The San Francisco Chronicle said "Cherish is a film of real beauty".

=== The Darwin Awards ===
Taylor's next film would be The Darwin Awards, which Taylor began writing in 1999. The film is set around a forensic detective investigating a potential Darwin award winner. It was also Taylor's highest budgeted film to date, and boasted a cast of well known actors including Joseph Fiennes, Winona Ryder, and David Arquette. In January 2006, The Darwin Awards premiered at the Sundance Film Festival. The film was the first to feature actor Chris Penn to be released after the actor's death. Taylor would say of Penn, "he gave an incredible performance in the film that's going to make a lot of people laugh for a years to come."

== Filmography ==
| Year | Title | Director | Writer |
|---|---|---|---|
| 1994 | Pontiac Moon | No | Yes |
| 1997 | Dream with the Fishes | Yes | Yes |
| 2002 | Cherish | Yes | Yes |
| 2006 | The Darwin Awards | Yes | Yes |
| 2016 | Unleashed | Yes | Yes |
| 2023 | The Optimist | Yes | Yes |
