= XO, Kitty =

Romantic comedy-drama television series

- Genre: Romantic comedy drama
- Created by: Jenny Han
- Based on: Characters by Jenny Han
- Starring: Anna Cathcart; Gia Kim; Sang Heon Lee; Choi Min-yeong; Anthony Keyvan; Peter Thurnwald; Regan Aliyah; Philippe Lee; Audrey Huynh; Sule Thelwell; Hojo Shin
- Music by: Shirley Song & Jina Hyojin An
- Country of origin: United States
- Original languages: English; Korean
- No. of seasons: 3
- No. of episodes: 26

Production
- Executive producers: Jenny Han; Sascha Rothchild; Matt Kaplan
- Camera setup: Single-camera
- Running time: 26–35 minutes
- Production companies: Paramount Television Studios (Note: Known as Awesomeness for seasons 1–2); ACE Entertainment; Jenny Kissed Me; Purple Pen Inc.

Original release
- Network: Netflix
- Release: May 18, 2023 – present

Related
- To All the Boys I've Loved Before

XO, Kitty is an American romantic comedy drama television series created by Jenny Han, who also serves as writer and executive producer in addition to being a showrunner, which premiered on Netflix on May 18, 2023. It is a spin-off of the To All the Boys film series (itself an adaptation of Han's book trilogy To All the Boys I've Loved Before), and marks as the first Netflix television series to be spun off from a Netflix original film.

The series stars Anna Cathcart, who reprises the title role as Kitty Song-Covey, a high school student and the younger sister of Lara Jean Song-Covey – the central character from the film series. Kitty goes on her own journey to learn about her late mother’s alma mater and experience friendship and romance.

In June 2023, the series was renewed for a second season, which premiered on January 16, 2025. In February 2025, the series was renewed for a third season, which premiered on April 2, 2026.

== Cast and characters ==
=== Main ===
- Anna Cathcart as Katherine "Kitty" Song-Covey
- Gia Kim as Yuri Han
- Sang Heon Lee as Min-ho Moon
- Choi Min-yeong as Dae-heon "Dae" Kim
- Anthony Keyvan as Quincy "Q" Shabazian
- Peter Thurnwald as Professor Alex Finnerty Lee
- Regan Aliyah as Juliana Porter (seasons 2–3, recurring season 1)
- Philippe Lee as Young Moon (seasons 2–3)
- Audrey Huynh as Esther Shim/Stella Cho (season 2)
- Sule Thelwell as Marius (season 3)
- Hojo Shin as Jiwon Ahn (season 3, recurring season 2)

=== Recurring ===
- Yunjin Kim as Principal Jina Lim (season 1)
- Michael K. Lee as Professor Daniel Lee
- Jocelyn Shelfo as Madison Miller
- Lee Sung-wook as Mr. Kim
- Théo Augier Bonaventure as Florian Simon (season 1)
- Lee Hyung-chul as Mr. Han (seasons 1–2)
- Sunny Oh as Mihee Yoon
- Ryu Han-bi as Eunice Kang
- Sasha Bhasin as Praveena Bhakti (seasons 2–3)
- Joshua Hyunho Lee as Jintaek "Jin" Lee (seasons 2–3)
- Soy Kim as Yisoo (season 3)
- Christine Hwang as Gigi Park (season 3)

=== Guest ===
- John Corbett as Dan Covey (season 1)
- Sarayu Blue as Trina Rothschild (season 1)
- Han Chae-young as Dami (season 1)
- Ok Taec-yeon as Ocean Park (season 1)
- Chaerin as Lulu (season 1)
- Peniel Shin as Joon-ho Moon (seasons 2–3)
- Noah Centineo as Peter Kavinsky (season 2)
- Janel Parrish as Margot Song-Covey (season 2)
- Lana Condor as Lara Jean Song-Covey (season 3)
- Jung Gun-joo as Tae-Oh (season 3)

== Episodes ==
=== Series overview ===
Season	Episodes	Originally released
1	10	May 18, 2023
2	8	January 16, 2025
3	8	April 2, 2026

=== Season 1 (2023) ===
No. overall	No. in season	Title	Directed by	Written by	Original release date
1	1	"XO (Note: A North American acronym meaning "hugs and kisses")"	Jennifer Arnold	Jenny Han & Siobhan Vivian	May 18, 2023
Kitty Song-Covey, who is in a long-distance relationship with her boyfriend Dae in South Korea, receives a full scholarship to the Korean Independent School of Seoul (KISS), where Dae attends and her late mother once studied. Hoping to reconnect with both Dae and her mother’s memory, Kitty convinces her father to let her attend. After arriving in Seoul and struggling to navigate the city alone, she meets popular KISS student Yuri Han, who gives her a ride to school. Kitty later learns that Yuri and Dae are pretending to date to conceal Yuri’s secret relationship with Juliana Porter, with Yuri paying Dae’s tuition in return. At the school’s welcome party, Kitty is devastated to see Dae with Yuri and flees in embarrassment after falling into a dessert tower.
2	2	"WTF (Note: An acronym for "What the Fuck")"	Jennifer Arnold	Siobhan Vivian	May 18, 2023
Dae attempts to explain the truth to Kitty, but she refuses to hear him out. Due to a school mix-up, Kitty is assigned to room with Dae and his friends, Q and Min-ho. Although she initially plans to leave, she decides to stay after discovering places on campus connected to her late mother. Meanwhile, a scandal involving Yuri’s father prompts Jina to publicly announce Yuri and Dae’s relationship during a press conference promoting new scholarships for low-income students. When Dae hesitates to hold Yuri’s hand, Kitty realizes their relationship is fake.
3	3	"KISS (Note: An acronym for "Korean Independent School of Seoul")"	Jeff Chan	Alanna Bennett	May 18, 2023
On the first day at KISS, Kitty is nicknamed the “Portland Stalker.” Dae wants to tell Kitty that his relationship with Yuri is fake, but an NDA prevents him from revealing the reason behind it. After a teacher suspects Dae wrote Yuri’s assignment, Jina takes away Yuri’s credit card, disrupting her plans with Juliana. Kitty helps Q get closer to Florian Simon, while Min-ho becomes angry after Kitty reveals his embarrassing childhood nickname, “Poopy Baby.” Struggling academically, Kitty is assigned Dae as her tutor, but their relationship deteriorates when he breaks up with her and returns her mother’s necklace, claiming his relationship with Yuri is real. Later, Kitty discovers a 1993 hospital bracelet in her mother’s diary, leading her to realize her mother had a baby as a teenager.
4	4	"TGIF (Note: An acronym for "Thank God It's Friday")"	Jeff Chan	Emily Kim	May 18, 2023
Kitty is moved to the girls’ dorm after Min-ho reports a housing mistake. She struggles with a messy, gaming-obsessed roommate while trying to reconnect with Dae and share what she has learned about her mother. She joins Q’s outdoor activity club for private time with Dae, but Min-ho informs Yuri, who also joins. While taking photos for Yuri, Kitty traces the hospital listed on a baby bracelet and sneaks into its records room, where she learns she has a half-brother adopted by an Australian couple. Caught by security, she is rescued by Professor Alex Finnerty, who shares his own adoption experience, leading Kitty to suspect he may be her brother. Meanwhile, Min-ho finds a video of Kitty posted by her roommate, prompting the boys to push for her to move out. Q suggests she move back in with them, creating tension between Dae and Kitty.
5	5	"TBH (Note: An acronym for "To Be Honest")"	Jennifer Arnold	Sarah Choi	May 18, 2023
During Chuseok, families gather to celebrate. Kitty organizes a dinner with Alex and other expats, intending to tell him they are related. Meanwhile, Yuri learns of her mother Jina’s past connection with Kitty’s mother, Eve Song, though Jina denies being close to her, and Yuri’s parents argue, leading Yuri to spend the holiday at Dae’s home. Kitty sends Dae a package containing a necklace she previously gave him, but Yuri intercepts it and does not deliver it. At Kitty’s dinner, she unknowingly serves mashed potatoes despite lactose intolerance being common among Asians, disrupting Min-ho’s plans to meet pop star Lulu, though their date is rescheduled. Alex reveals he is unaware that Professor Daniel Lee is his father. Later, Yuri returns home to find Chuseok preparations, while Jina privately destroys a 1993 KISS yearbook photo of herself and Eve.
6	6	"BYOB (Note: An acronym for "Bring Your Own Bottle")"	Jennifer Arnold	Hanna Stanbridge & Chris Martin	May 18, 2023
Min-ho dreams about Kitty, implying romantic feelings for her. Kitty is upset with Dae for not thanking her for returning his necklace, unaware that Yuri still has it. She wants to reconnect with Daniel and introduce Alex to Margot and Lara Jean, but Alex encourages her to focus on her studies instead. Q invites Kitty to Min-ho’s party, where she decides to look for someone new to kiss. Meanwhile, Yuri lies to her mother about going on a date with Dae while actually DJing at the party. Kitty meets Geon but loses interest after he insults Yuri, and in a drunken mistake sends a text intended for Alex to Daniel, leading him and Jina to discover the party and shut it down. Dae confronts Yuri about the necklace before Daniel stops the music and ends the event. Min-ho, misunderstanding Kitty and Dae’s interaction, kisses Madison Miller. Kitty then dreams about Yuri, implying romantic feelings for her.
7	7	"TIL (Note: Acronym for "Today I Learned")"	Pamela Romanowsky	Jessica O'Toole	May 18, 2023
Students caught at the party receive Saturday detention, and Daniel reveals that Kitty reported it. Yuri tells Dae she withheld his necklace out of fear he would abandon her for Kitty, and plans to return it, but instead wears it to detention after learning Kitty is living with Dae, escalating tensions. Jina sees the necklace and claims it is hers, exposing her lie about her relationship with Eve. Yuri and Kitty investigate the KISS 1993 yearbook and discover Jina had sent Juliana away; a photo of Jina and Eve wearing matching necklaces suggests Jina is Alex’s biological mother. Yuri later calls the paparazzi and publicly breaks up with Dae, sending her mother a message condemning her actions toward Juliana. Dae then finds Kitty and kisses her.
8	8	"LFG (Note: Acronym for "Let's Fucking Go")"	Pamela Romanowsky	Jessica O'Toole & Sascha Rothchild	May 18, 2023
Since getting back together, Kitty and Dae mostly kiss, leaving Kitty frustrated because he avoids discussing his past with Yuri, causing her to question his trustworthiness. The students volunteer in a flood-affected village to help with recovery efforts. Q and Florian face strain in their relationship due to Florian’s parents wanting him to move to Greece or France. Yuri confides in Kitty that she is gay and that Dae helped her conceal her relationship from her mother. With Margot’s help, Kitty locates Juliana and sets up a FaceTime call between her and Yuri. Dae surprises Kitty and confesses his love, which she reciprocates. Min-ho and Madison break up after realizing they want different things. Although Kitty tells Yuri that things are going well with Dae, seeing Yuri with Juliana makes her realize she is not fully happy.
9	9	"SNAFU (Note: Acronym for "Situation Normal: All Fucked Up")"	Katina Medina Mora	Sascha Rothchild	May 18, 2023
Jina admits to Alex that she used Eve’s name when giving birth to him. After Yuri overhears Jina discussing paying Alex to keep the secret hidden, she learns Alex is her half-brother and moves in with Kitty and the boys after coming out to her mother. Meanwhile, Kitty must pass all her classes to remain at KISS, so her friends help her prepare for a talent show that offers extra credit. As Yuri helps Kitty rehearse a fan dance, Kitty grows nervous around her. Before the performance, Jina reveals to Yuri that Alex is her half-brother, leading to an argument between Yuri and Kitty during the show. Kitty’s dress accidentally catches fire from misplaced fireworks, and Min-ho rescues her, causing Dae to realize Min-ho has feelings for Kitty. Later, Kitty admits to Dae that she has feelings for someone else, prompting him to angrily confront Min-ho.
10	10	"OTP (Note: Acronym for "One True Pair")"	Katina Medina Mora	Jessica O'Toole & Sascha Rothchild	May 18, 2023
Kitty tells Dae she has feelings for Yuri, leading to their breakup. Jina reveals to Daniel that Alex is his son, explaining she hid the truth so he would not abandon his dreams. Final exam results are released: Kitty passes all her classes but is expelled for living in the boys’ dorm. She gives Jina music she thought was for her mother, and Jina gives her a letter written by Eve that remains unanswered. Florian ranks first due to cheating, jeopardizing Dae’s scholarship, which requires top ranking, creating tension with Q. Before leaving, Kitty breaks up with Dae, and they acknowledge being each other’s first love. At the airport, Kitty prepares to confess her feelings to Yuri, but Juliana arrives, prompting her to leave. Yuri urges her mother to reverse Kitty’s expulsion. On the plane, Kitty reads her mother’s letter and learns about her first love, Simon. Min-ho, seated beside her, confesses his feelings, leaving Kitty stunned.

=== Season 2 (2025) ===
No. overall	No. in season	Title	Directed by	Written by	Original release date
11	1	"K.I.S.S. Me Again"	Katina Medina Mora	Jessica O'Toole	January 16, 2025
Kitty returns to KISS after Yuri convinces the school to readmit her, but finds major changes at the school following Jina’s scandal, including Daniel becoming principal and the launch of a new performing arts program led by Min-ho’s father, Young Moon. Yuri and Juliana reunite and share a dorm room with Kitty and a new student named Stella Cho, while Kitty struggles with her feelings for Yuri and considers switching rooms. Daniel reveals new information about Eve’s past in Korea and her strained relationship with her mother, prompting Kitty to investigate further. Meanwhile, Yuri copes with her parents’ divorce and supports Kitty after she comes out as bisexual. By the end of the night, Kitty decides to focus on her studies and learning more about her mother while trying to move on from Yuri.
12	2	"Never Been Kissed"	Katina Medina Mora	Siobhan Vivian	January 16, 2025
Kitty pursues a crush on Praveena Bhakti, but the night ends badly when it is revealed she still has feelings for Yuri. Juliana, aware of Kitty’s feelings, appropriates one of Kitty’s pieces of advice after tensions arise between her and Yuri following Jina’s partial support of her coming out. Kitty learns from Jina that Simon was not her mother’s first love but her cousin. Q is deceived by rival Jin Lee, who previously bullied Dae and Min-ho, and loses a race to him. After Kitty mentions Yuri and Juliana’s relationship to Q, Daniel overhears and tells Yuri and Juliana that one of them must move out of the dorm. During their first date, Min-ho initially finds Stella boring, but after she stands up to his father in support of him, he kisses her.
13	3	"New Year's Kiss"	Steven Tsuchida	Sarah Choi	January 16, 2025
Tensions rise between Kitty and Juliana after Kitty accidentally reveals their relationship to Daniel, resulting in Yuri moving back in with her mother. Juliana blames Kitty for Yuri growing closer to her mother, and becomes upset when Yuri arrives late to her painting exhibition after spending time with Kitty. During Seollal, Min-ho’s father hosts a talent show with a cash prize. Dae, encouraged by Min-ho, enters and is paired with Eunice Kang, who helps him with dancing. Kitty and Praveena recruit Min-ho for a plan to open a time capsule linked to Kitty’s mother, which turns out to be a videotape. While watching it with Yuri, Kitty learns that Eve and Simon intended to reunite their mothers, prompting her to decide to search for her own family after the skiing trip, and she asks Yuri to join her. Yuri agrees, and she and Kitty kiss just as Min-ho walks in on them.
14	4	"Kiss and Tell"	Steven Tsuchida	Alanna Bennett	January 16, 2025
Min-ho’s father does not attend a skiing trip with Min-ho and his friends because his eldest son, Joon-ho, is in Seoul. Q secretly invites Jin on the trip and reconciles with Min-ho and Dae. Yuri asks Kitty to keep their kiss secret, as she is in a relationship with Juliana. However, Kitty’s letter to Yuri is discovered by Eunice and read aloud, leading to the breakups of Yuri and Juliana, as well as Praveena and Kitty. Kitty later goes to the jacuzzi alone, where Min-ho joins her to comfort her, causing tension with Stella, who witnesses them together. Kitty learns from Jin that Stella had been searching through desk drawers and was responsible for taking the letter. Min-ho tells Stella he had feelings for Kitty, but she rejected him on the plane after recently breaking up with Dae. Dae overhears this conversation and ends his friendship with Min-ho.
15	5	"Kissing Cousins"	Anna Mastro	George Northy	January 16, 2025
Kitty is ignored by Yuri, Juliana, and Praveena. Suspecting Stella is behind the letter incident, Kitty asks Q to check on her and encourages him to reconcile with Juliana. After Juliana and Q encounter Stella outside a cybercafé, they agree Stella is acting strangely. Kitty visits her relatives with Min-ho and meets her cousin, Jiwon Ahn. After Jiwon reveals that Simon is her father, Kitty is disowned by her great-aunt Soon Ja, and Min-ho comforts her in the rain. Meanwhile, Yuri, after speaking with Alex, realizes she should give Juliana space. An Instagram account called “Moon Leaks” emerges, spreading scandalous information about Min-ho’s father. Dae asks Min-ho to take him to the hospital after learning his father has been in a car accident.
16	6	"Kiss and Make Up"	Anna Mastro	Nina Kim	January 16, 2025
Peter Kavinsky arrives in Korea for a lacrosse game and gives Kitty letters between Simon and Eve found by Lara Jean. Kitty learns her mother had planned to reconcile with her family in Korea before her death. Young Moon announces a new solo-only competition with a contract prize, forcing Dae and Eunice to compete against each other. Min-ho discovers Joon-ho missed Seollal because of a pregnancy scandal and reconciles with Dae to help him win. Yuri reconnects with Jiwon, who texts Kitty, while Q replaces an injured Jin in the track competition and wins. Kitty exposes Stella as Esther Shim, a former Young Stars contestant humiliated online after being rejected, but Min-ho refuses to believe her. Peter encourages Kitty to trust herself, while Stella reveals she hid a microphone in a gift for Min-ho’s father and learns Joon-ho’s scandal could destroy his company.
17	7	"Kiss of Death"	Sherwin Shilati	Raul Martin Romero & Siobhan Vivian	January 16, 2025
Young Moon announces the competition winner will open for Joon-ho, while Stella asks Min-ho for a late entry. Yuri urges Dae to focus on winning for his father, even as his relationship with Eunice falls apart. Kitty reunites with Jiwon and learns from her great-aunt that a family dispute began when her grandmother married for love instead of following her parents’ wishes, leading to estrangement before a planned reconciliation trip to Korea. Kitty and Min-ho grow closer after sharing a dance, and Min-ho realizes Kitty was right about Stella after she changes her appearance despite once claiming beauty comes from within. Stella later threatens Min-ho with exposing his family scandal and framing Kitty for the Moon Leaks account. Kitty finally realizes she is in love with Min-ho.
18	8	"Sealed with a Kiss"	Sherwin Shilati	Valentina Garza	January 16, 2025
Margot tells Kitty that their grandmother has agreed to reconcile with her sister and plans to visit Korea. Before the competition, Min-ho exposes Stella’s blackmail scheme to his father. Stella sabotages several contestants, including Eunice and Dae, but Kitty and her friends help Dae perform. Jin admits he faked his injury, while Q reveals he was accepted into a USC summer program. Stella’s performance is cancelled after Joon-ho publicly announces his girlfriend’s pregnancy, and Young Moon sends Stella back to Ohio. Before leaving, Stella admits her feelings for Min-ho became real, though she knew he loved Kitty. Eunice wins the competition, while Yuri struggles after learning her father faces a lawsuit and Juliana has moved on with Praveena. Min-ho flies Kitty and her grandmother to Korea, where their family reconciles. Kitty’s scholarship is renewed, and after realizing Min-ho is joining Joon-ho’s tour, she asks to go with him, and he agrees.

=== Season 3 (2026) ===
No. overall	No. in season	Title	Directed by	Written by	Original release date
19	1	"Guest List"	Sherwin Shilati	Teleplay by : Jessica O'Toole & Valentina Garza; Story by : Valentina Garza & Siobhan Vivian	April 2, 2026
Kitty plans to confess her feelings to Min-ho during a trip to Busan, but complications arise after he is appointed Eunice’s manager and Kitty accidentally wears a dress meant for Eunice’s presentation. Yuri struggles with her family’s bankruptcy and distances herself from Dae, who still has feelings for Eunice. Young Moon warns Kitty to stay away from Min-ho, calling her a distraction. After leaving the yacht upset, Kitty finally confesses her feelings to Min-ho and the two kiss. However, Kitty is unable to join Min-ho on tour after Lara Jean calls asking for help with problems involving Peter. As Min-ho leaves in a limousine surrounded by partying celebrities, including Eunice, Kitty watches anxiously as he drives away.
20	2	"Sunset List"	Sherwin Shilati	Sarah Choi	April 2, 2026
Kitty returns from New York for a new school year at KISS, where Jiwon has become a teacher. She is given a “Senior Sunset” bucket list and told she must complete graduation requirements, including a Korean culture class. Kitty learns that Q has been in a relationship with his new roommate, Marius, which threatens his relationship with Jin. Yuri is forced to leave KISS due to financial issues, and Kitty suggests she sell her clothes to raise tuition money. Marius organizes a party, leading Kitty to challenge him to a competition: if she wins, he must change dorms, and if she loses, she will give up watching the senior sunrise. She loses after being distracted by Jiwon. Min-ho arranges a sunset event for Kitty so she can still complete the item on her list, and the two officially become a couple. Meanwhile, Marius contacts someone named Gigi, asking for help in getting rid of Kitty.
21	3	"Play List"	Katrina Medina Mora	Siobhan Vivian	April 2, 2026
Kitty attempts to set up Alex and Jiwon while adjusting to life at KISS. She meets Gigi, who is revealed to be Min-ho’s first love, though he reassures Kitty that she has nothing to worry about. Eunice films a promotional video at an aquarium and brings both Alex and Jiwon together, complicating Kitty’s matchmaking plans. Q reveals that Marius, with Gigi’s help, has been manipulating him and blackmailing him with an intimate photo he sent. Kitty tries to help Eunice but accidentally damages her dress, which Yuri repairs. With Gigi’s assistance, Yuri secures a job with a fashion designer. Dae supports Eunice but learns about a past incident involving her and Tae-Oh during the tour. Jiwon confronts Kitty for interfering in Alex’s and her professional lives and rescinds her earlier extension, increasing Kitty’s workload. Realizing the consequences of her actions, Kitty decides she must focus on her studies to graduate.
22	4	"A List"	Michael Medico	Nina Kim	April 2, 2026
The students visit an amusement park, organized with Kitty’s help. Eunice’s rising popularity leads Young Moon to give Min-ho additional responsibilities, and he later asks Kitty if she might consider staying in Korea. Worried that failing her exams could affect her ability to remain in Korea with Min-ho and her friends, Kitty becomes anxious about her academic performance. After a conversation with Marius, she begins to see him in a new light. Kitty later learns she has passed her tests and celebrates by riding a roller-coaster her mother once rode, alongside her friends. Marius tells Q that he is the reason he returned. Eunice messages Min-ho, claiming she believes she is pregnant, and Kitty sees the two embracing, leading her to suspect something is going on between them.
23	5	"Off the List"	Michael Medico	Starr Shapiro & Terrence Coli	April 2, 2026
Kitty celebrates Chuseok with her friends at Dae’s father’s restaurant. Tensions rise when Yuri overhears a conversation between Min-ho and Eunice and informs Kitty, who later discovers a positive pregnancy test in the restroom. Believing Min-ho is the father and that he lied to her, Kitty confronts him. In the process, she accidentally reveals Marius and Q’s relationship to Jin, causing a confrontation that upsets Q. Kitty also tells Dae about the alleged pregnancy and recalls her past encounter with him in Paris. Eunice later reveals to Dae that she is not pregnant and that her period was simply late. Kitty tries to apologize to Min-ho, but he ends their relationship, saying he no longer trusts her. Upset, Kitty calls Lara Jean, who books her a flight to Seoul.
24	6	"Wait List"	Katrina Medina Mora	George Northy	April 2, 2026
Lara Jean arrives in Seoul to comfort Kitty, and they meet Jiwon for lunch, where they learn that the pregnancy test Kitty found belongs to Jiwon. Jiwon confirms she is pregnant with Alex’s child. Marius attempts to reconcile with Q, but is rejected, while Q also tries to reconnect with Jin, who turns him down. Yuri enters a design competition, while Praveena arranges a blind date for her but later breaks up with Juliana after realizing she still has feelings for Yuri. Eunice tells Min-ho she no longer wants to pursue a music career, leading Young Moon to fire him. Min-ho instead offers Dae an opportunity to work with him in music after Dae is rejected from university. Before leaving Seoul, Lara Jean speaks with Min-ho and helps him realize how much he misses Kitty.
25	7	"Best Dressed List"	Anna Mastro	Deirdre Shaw & Valentina Garza	April 2, 2026
Kitty reconciles with Q and reunites her friends to help Yuri create a new collection for Seoul Fashion Week. She succeeds in mending several fractured friendships, though she does not reconcile with Min-ho. Dae and Yuri reunite before the show, contributing to the success of Yuri’s collection. Gigi encourages Min-ho to speak with Kitty, but when he approaches her, Kitty learns she has been accepted to NYU, causing Min-ho to hesitate and interrupt his confession.
26	8	"Wish List"	Anna Mastro	Siobhan Vivian & Valentina Garza	April 2, 2026
Kitty’s 18th birthday approaches, and her friends organize a surprise party for her. Alex informs his father about Jiwon’s pregnancy, and Soon Ja accepts their relationship. Lara Jean tells Kitty that she and Peter have reconciled. Min-ho searches for Kitty and finds her at a train station, where they confess their love for each other. Min-ho and Kitty then travel together to meet her family.

== Production ==
In March 2021, it was announced that a series spin-off to To All the Boys was in development, with each episode being a half-hour romantic comedy. The series got developed as a Netflix exclusive, from Awesomeness and ACE Entertainment. The books' original author Jenny Han was reported to be the creator, writer, executive producer, and showrunner, as well as writing the script for the pilot with Siobhan Vivian. Anna Cathcart was also reported to be reprising her role as Kitty Song-Covey. Six months later, Netflix ordered ten episodes along with announcing other crew members. Sascha Rothchild and Matt Kaplan joined Han as executive producers while the former is also the showrunner along with Han. On April 5, 2022, Choi Min-yeong, Anthony Keyvan, Gia Kim, Sang Heon Lee, Peter Thurnwald, and Regan Aliyah were cast as series regulars while Yunjin Kim, Michael K. Lee, and Jocelyn Shelfo joined the cast in recurring roles. By that date, production had begun in Seoul. Gia Kim and Sang Heon Lee, the actors who played Yuri and Min Ho, respectively, are siblings in real life.

On June 14, 2023, Netflix renewed the series for a second season. On April 25, 2024, it was announced that the second season had begun production in Seoul. On February 14, 2025, Netflix renewed the series for a third season. The third season began filming in May 2025 in Seoul. Filming for the third season wrapped on July 17, 2025. Three months later when Awesomeness' parent Paramount Global merged with Skydance Media to form Paramount Skydance, Awesomeness had been folded into Paramount Television Studios with them taking over production of the series' third season.

== Release ==
XO, Kitty premiered on Netflix on May 18, 2023. The second season premiered on January 16, 2025. The third season premiered on April 2, 2026.

== Reception ==
Critical response of XO, Kitty
Season	Rotten Tomatoes	Metacritic
1	82% (28 reviews)	68 (13 reviews)
2	83% (18 reviews)	70 (15 reviews)
3	61% (18 reviews)	48 (12 reviews)

For the first season, the review aggregator website Rotten Tomatoes reported an 82% approval rating with an average rating of 5.8/10, based on 28 critic reviews. The website's critics consensus reads, "A modest and sweet extension of all the films that fans have loved before, XO, Kitty aims straight for the heart and finds its mark." Metacritic, which uses a weighted average, assigned a score of 68 out of 100 based on 8 critics, indicating "generally favorable" reviews.

The second season has an 83% approval rating on Rotten Tomatoes, based on 18 critic reviews, with an average rating of 6.5/10. The website's critics consensus reads, "Returning with improved form, XO Kitty's second season injects a lovely mix of fun and memorable characters into its exceedingly saccharine proceedings." On Metacritic, it has a weighted average score of 70 out of 100 based on 5 critics, indicating "generally favorable" reviews.

The third season has a 61% approval rating on Rotten Tomatoes, based on 18 critic reviews, with an average rating of 5.8/10. On Metacritic, it has a weighted average score of 48 out of 100 based on 4 critics, indicating "mixed or average" reviews.

While the series had a high viewership on Netflix in more than 50 countries, it received minimal attention in South Korea, where the show takes place. A reason cited for this was that the global success of South Korean media led to the country's people not caring about its depiction in foreign productions. Another explanation was that thrillers and action shows are more popular than romance shows in South Korea.

=== Awards and nominations ===
Year	Award	Category	Nominee(s)	Result	Ref.
2023	Children's and Family Emmy Awards	Outstanding Young Teen Series	XO, Kitty	Nominated	
2024	GLAAD Media Awards	Outstanding Kids and Family Programming	XO, Kitty	Nominated	
2025	Kids' Choice Awards	Favorite Family TV Show	XO, Kitty	Won	
2025	Kids' Choice Awards	Favorite Female TV Star (Family)	Anna Cathcart	Nominated	
2025	Television Critics Association Awards	Outstanding Achievement in Family Programming	XO, Kitty	Nominated	
2026	GLAAD Media Awards	Outstanding Kids and Family Programming	XO, Kitty	Won	
2026	Kids' Choice Awards	Favorite Family TV Show	XO, Kitty	Nominated	
2026	Kids' Choice Awards	Favorite Female TV Star (Family)	Anna Cathcart	Nominated	
