= Tyler Taormina =

American director and producer

- Born: 1990; Long Island, New York
- Occupations: Director, screenwriter, producer
- Years active: 2015–present

Tyler Thomas Taormina (born 1990) is an American film director, screenwriter, producer, and musician. He has directed Ham on Rye (2019), Happer's Comet (2022) and Christmas Eve in Miller's Point (2024). Taormina is also a co-founder of the Los Angeles-based independent filmmaking collective Omnes Films.

== Early life ==
Taormina was born and raised in the town of Smithtown on Long Island, New York. As students at Emerson College in Boston, Taormina, Carson Lund and other cinephile friends began collaborating on short films as Omnes Films. He graduated in 2013.

== Career ==
Upon moving to Los Angeles, Taormina initially made television projects for kids including the webseries Suburban Legends.

In 2019, Taormina's debut feature Ham on Rye, premiered at the Santa Barbara International Film Festival, and screened at the Locarno Film Festival and Deauville American Film Festival later that summer. It was released in October 2020 by Factory 25.

In 2022, Taormina directed Happer's Comet which premiered in the Forum section at the Berlinale. It was released in July 2023 by Factory 25.

In 2024, Taormina directed Christmas Eve in Miller's Point starring Michael Cera, Francesca Scorsese, Matilda Fleming, Maria Dizzia, Elsie Fisher, and Sawyer Spielberg. It had its world premiere at the 2024 Cannes Film Festival in the Directors' Fortnight section and was released on November 8, 2024, by IFC Films.

Taormina has also served as a producer on Eephus, Los capítulos perdidos, and No Sleep Till.

As a musician, Taormina was a member of the band Adam & Naive before recording solo albums as Cloud. In 2018, Taormina released his final Cloud album, Plays with Fire, via Audio Antihero. The release was accompanied by The Desperation Club (a Cloud tribute album featuring 34 covers performed by Mines Falls, Samira Winter, Magana, Benjamin Shaw, Jack Hayter, Anthony Harding, and others). During his music career, he received positive coverage from Pitchfork, Stereogum The Line of Best Fit, The Alternative, Drowned in Sound, and DIY Mag, as well as BBC airplay. He also participated in an artist-to-artist interview with Even As We Speak.

== Filmography ==
=== Feature film ===
| Year | Title | Director | Producer | Writer |
|---|---|---|---|---|
| 2019 | Ham on Rye | Yes | Yes | Yes |
| 2021 | Topology of Sirens | No | Yes | No |
| 2022 | Happer's Comet | Yes | Yes | Yes |
| 2024 | Christmas Eve in Miller's Point | Yes | Yes | Yes |
| 2024 | Eephus | No | Yes | No |
| 2024 | Los capítulos perdidos | No | Co-Producer | No |
| 2024 | No Sleep Till | No | Yes | No |

== Discography ==
=== Albums ===
- Elephant Era (Practice Room Records, 2010)
- Rocket (Practice Room Records, 2011)
- Comfort Songs (Audio Antihero, 2013)
- Zen Summer (Paper Trail Records, 2015)
- Plays with Fire (Audio Antihero, 2018)
- Live at Kulak's Woodshed (Audio Antihero, 2019)
