= Sasha Spielberg =

American actress and singer

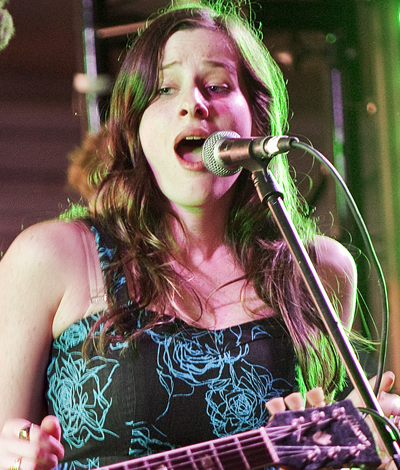
- Spielberg at the 2013 Jubilee Music & Arts Festival
- Born: Sasha Rebecca Spielberg; May 14, 1990 (age 36); Los Angeles, California, U.S.
- Other name: Buzzy Lee
- Education: Brown University
- Occupations: Musician; actress
- Years active: 1999–present
- Spouse: Harry McNally (m. 2022)
- Parent(s): Steven Spielberg; Kate Capshaw
- Relatives: Sawyer Spielberg (brother); Destry Spielberg (sister); Jessica Capshaw (half-sister); Arnold Spielberg (grandfather); Keith McNally (father-in-law)

Sasha Rebecca Spielberg (born May 14, 1990), also known by her stage name Buzzy Lee, is an American actress and musician.

== Life and career ==
Spielberg was born at Cedars-Sinai Medical Center in Los Angeles, the daughter of film director Steven Spielberg and actress Kate Capshaw. Her father is from an Orthodox Jewish family, and her mother is a Jewish convert. She is their first child together, although each has children from previous relationships. She has three sisters: Mikaela Spielberg, Destry Spielberg, and half-sister Jessica Capshaw, as well as three brothers: Sawyer Spielberg, Theo Spielberg, and half-brother Max Spielberg. She graduated from Brown University.

Spielberg has acted in several of her father's movies, including The Terminal, Munich, Indiana Jones and the Kingdom of the Crystal Skull, and The Post. She performed in the band Wardell (previously known as Brother/Sister) with her brother Theo. Their Brother/Sister EP The Accidental Zoo was released on April 4, 2011. Their album Love/Idleness was released in 2015.

Spielberg has collaborated with composer and fellow Brown University alumnus Nicolas Jaar under the name Just Friends. They released a cover of Leonard Cohen's "Avalanche" and an original song, "Don't Tell Me."

In 2015, Spielberg produced, wrote for, and starred in Snapchat's first mobile series, Literally Can't Even. She also shares her mini-improv sketches on Instagram. On April 27, 2018, she released her solo EP Facepaint, with five songs.

Spielberg has also collaborated with rapper and producer JPEGMafia on several occasions, the first in 2019 on JPEGMafia's songs "Grimy Waifu" and "Dots Freestyle Remix", from his third studio album, All My Heroes Are Cornballs, where Spielberg was a featured artist. They collaborated again on the song "Nemo!" on JPEGMafia's fourth studio album, LP!. They continued this partnership on his fifth studio album, I Lay Down My Life for You, where she is featured on the songs "Don't Put Anything On the Bible" and "I Lay Down My Life For You". Most recently, they collaborated again on his sixth studio album Experimental Rap with the song "Bridges on Fire". She has also collaborated with rapper Denzel Curry on the song "John Wayne" on Curry's fourth studio album Melt My Eyez See Your Future. The song was produced by JPEGMafia.

== Personal life ==
In May 2022, Spielberg married Harry McNally, son of restaurateur Keith McNally.

== Filmography ==
Year	Title	Role	Notes
1999	The Love Letter	Girl with Sparkler	
2004	The Terminal	Lucy	
2005	Munich	Young Israeli Woman Watching TV	
2008	Indiana Jones and the Kingdom of the Crystal Skull	Slugger	
2010	The Company Men	Sarah	
2010	The Dry Land	Sally	
2010	The Kids Are All Right	Waify Girl	
2011	The Art of Getting By	Zoe Rubenstein	
2013	Before I Sleep	Rachel	
2017	The Post	Woman with Package	
2018	Dude	Carrie	
2018	In a Relationship	Clara	
2021	Licorice Pizza	Cindy	

== Discography ==
Year	Title
2013	The Brother/Sister EP
2015	Love/Idleness
2018	Facepaint – EP (as Buzzy Lee)
2019	Close Encounters of Their Own Kind (as Buzzy Lee, with Tommy Mandel)
2021	Spoiled Love (as Buzzy Lee)
2023	Internal Affairs (as Buzzy Lee)
2026	Shoulder to Shoulder (as Buzzy Lee)
