= Wardell (band) =

American indie folk rock band

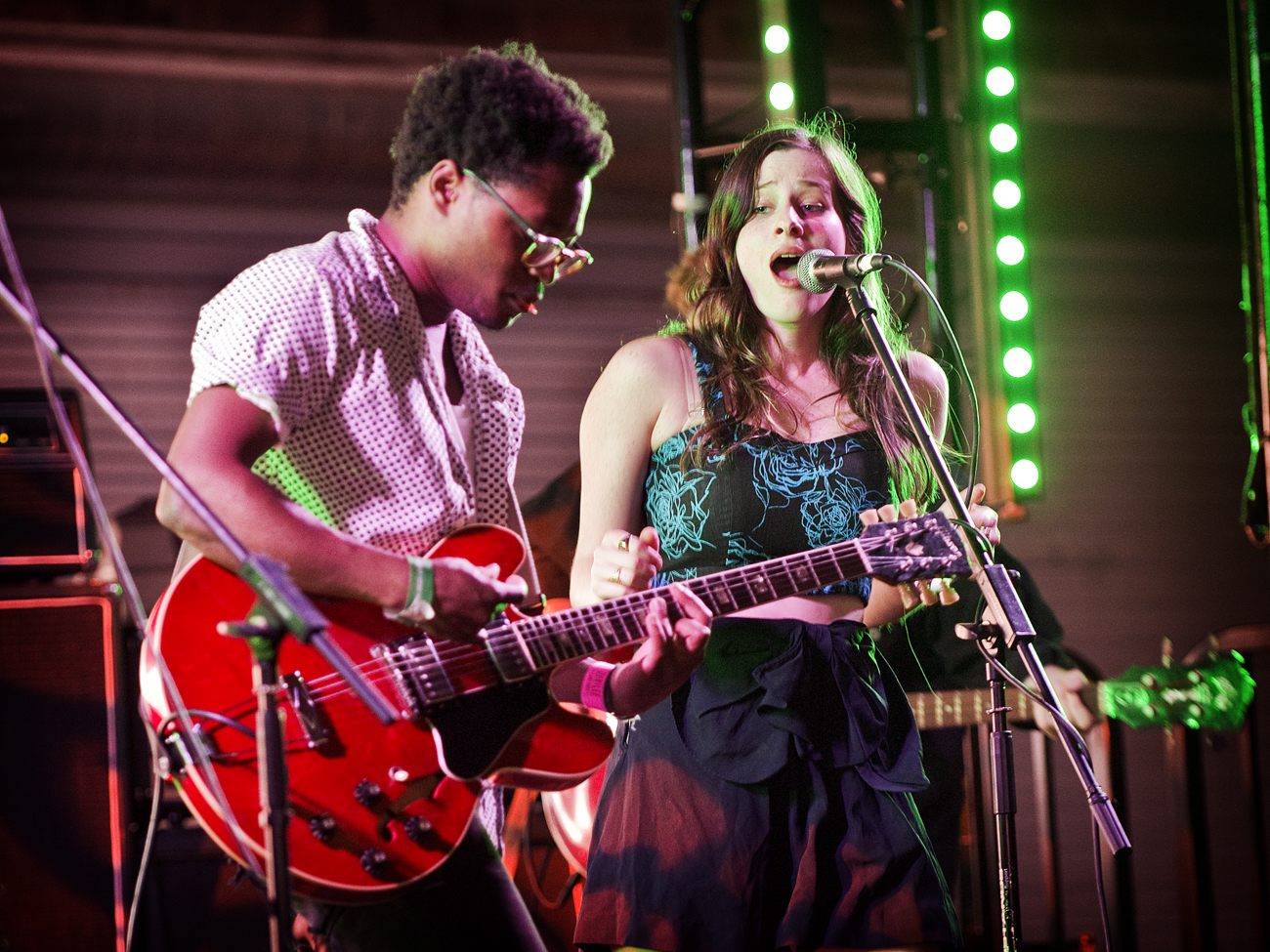
- Wardell in 2013

Background information
- Genre: Indie folk
- Years active: 2013-present
- Label: Roc Nation
- Members: Sasha Spielberg; Theo Spielberg

Wardell is an indie folk rock band formed by siblings Sasha and Theo Spielberg.

== History ==
Sasha and Theo Spielberg are siblings and children of director Steven Spielberg and actress Kate Capshaw. They performed together as kids in puppet shows and cover bands but only began their band in earnest in 2010, with live shows starting in 2012. They started collaborating in college, when Theo asked Sasha to sing over a chord progression he had been working on, which became the song "Opossum" and was named an NPR Song of the Day in late 2011. Sasha has said the duo created the song quickly, "like, in an hour". The song brought the band national exposure and led to their signing with Roc Nation.

The band played at South by Southwest in March 2013 and released their Brother/Sister EP in the summer. Their album Love/Idleness was released on February 10, 2015, on their own label. Its first track, "Funny Thing", was initially released in November 2014.

The band's name, Wardell, is Theo's middle name and their mother's nickname. Sasha is the band's vocalist and Theo plays guitar, drums, piano, and other instruments. The duo were influenced by The Strokes' Is This It, Christina Aguilera's Stripped, and Janis Joplin's Pearl. The band is planning a full-length album.

== Reception ==
Christopher R. Weingarten of Spin described their sound at their debut as "the flavor of the month ... two years ago" and added that music journalists were not seriously considering the band, though they "clearly" had an audience. Jessica Hopper of Rookie magazine did not find the band's sound to be unique and added that their fame was not proportional to their status as a new band. Critics were frustrated by the difficulty of classifying the band's music into existing genres.

Their song "Opossum" was named an NPR Song of the Day in late 2011, and the band was The Guardian's band of the day in March 2013.
