= Jessica Capshaw =

American actress

- Born: Jessica Brooke Capshaw; August 9, 1976 (age 50); Columbia, Missouri, U.S.
- Education: Brown University (BA)
- Occupations: Actress; activist; entrepreneur
- Years active: 1996–present
- Spouse: Christopher Gavigan (m. 2004)
- Children: 4
- Mother: Kate Capshaw
- Relatives: Steven Spielberg (stepfather); Sasha Spielberg (half-sister); Sawyer Spielberg (half-brother); Destry Spielberg (half-sister)

External image
- Capshaw in 2011.

Jessica Brooke Capshaw (born August 9, 1976) is an American actress known for her roles as Jamie Stringer on the ABC legal drama series The Practice, pediatric surgeon Dr. Arizona Robbins on the ABC medical drama Grey's Anatomy and Blythe Hart on the ABC procedural drama 9-1-1: Nashville.

== Early life ==
Capshaw was born Jessica Brooke Capshaw on August 9, 1976, in Columbia, Missouri to Robert Capshaw and actress Kate Capshaw. She is the stepdaughter of director Steven Spielberg, whom her mother married when Jessica was 15.

Capshaw graduated from Harvard-Westlake School in Los Angeles in 1994, then attended Brown University, where she was in productions of Arcadia and Cat on a Hot Tin Roof. She graduated in 1998 with a Bachelor of Arts in English Literature. During summers, she attended classes at the Royal Academy of Dramatic Art (RADA) in London, where she appeared as Puck in a production of A Midsummer Night's Dream.

== Career ==
Capshaw had a minor role as Jeremy Davies' potential love interest in The Locusts (1997), which starred her mother, then appeared in Adam Rifkin's independent film Denial (1998). She played Dorothy Wheeler in the slasher film Valentine (2001), had a minor role in Minority Report (2002), then a lead role in Edward Burns's The Groomsmen (2006).

In 2009, Capshaw became a regular on the medical drama Grey's Anatomy. It was announced in December 2008 that she would join the cast as pediatric surgeon Arizona Robbins for a multi-episode arc. Initially scheduled to appear in only three episodes of the show's fifth season, series creator Shonda Rhimes extended her contract to appear in all of the season's remaining episodes, and she became a series regular in the sixth season.

Capshaw was established as a love interest for orthopedic surgery resident Callie Torres (Sara Ramirez). Rhimes was pleased with the chemistry between them, saying that the addition of Capshaw to the cast was an element of the season of which she was most proud: "I love Jessica Capshaw, and when I say love I mean love. She couldn't be a more wonderful person, and I feel like the chemistry Arizona and Callie have feels like the Meredith and Derek chemistry to me. I find them delightful to watch." Initial media reaction was positive. Matt Mitovich of TV Guide called Capshaw a "fan favorite", and Chris Monfette of IGN praised the addition of "fresh, new characters" such as Robbins over the course of the season.

In March 2018, Capshaw left Grey’s Anatomy, with the producers citing creative reasons. She posted a statement on Twitter highlighting her character's significance: "She was one of the first members of the LGBTQ community to be represented in a series regular role on network television. Her impact on the world is permanent and forever."

In April 2025, Capshaw was announced as a main cast member of the 9-1-1 spin-off 9-1-1: Nashville, playing Blythe Hart, the wife of fire captain Don Hart. The series premiered on October 9, 2025. Capshaw later described the role as her first time working with Ryan Murphy and noted that the series blends large-scale emergency storytelling with family drama.

== Personal life ==
Capshaw married Christopher Gavigan in 2004. Together they have four children.

== Filmography ==
=== Film ===
Year	Title	Role	Notes
1997	The Locusts	Patsy	
1998	Denial	Marcia	
1999	The Love Letter	Kelly	
2000	Killing Cinderella	Beth	
2000	Big Time	Claire	Short film
2001	Valentine	Dorothy Wheeler	
2001	The Back Page		TV Movie
2002	The Mesmerist	Daisy Valdemar	
2002	Minority Report	Evanna	
2003	View from the Top	Royalty International Flight Attendant	Uncredited
2006	The Groomsmen	Jen	
2007	Blind Trust	Cassie Stewart	
2010	One Angry Juror	Sarah Walsh	TV Movie
2014	The Hero of Color City	Duck	
2020	Holidate	Abigail “Abby”Benson	
2022	Dear Zoe	Elly Gladstone	
2026	Influenced	Amy	

=== Television ===
Year	Title	Role	Notes
1999	ER	Sally McKenna	1 episode: "Rites of Spring"
1999–2000	Odd Man Out	Aunt Jordan	Main cast; 13 episodes
2002–2004	The Practice	Jamie Stringer	Main cast (Season 7-8); 42 episodes
2005	How I Met Your Mother	uncredited	1 episode: “Okay Awesome”
2005	Into the West	Rachel Wheeler	1 episode: "Manifest Destiny"
2006	Thick and Thin	Mary	Unaired
2006	Bones	Rebecca Stinson	2 episodes: "Mother and Child in the Bay", "The Truth in the Lye"
2007	The L Word	Nadia Karella	3 episodes: "Livin' La Vida Loca", "Lassoed", "Layup"
2009	Head Case		1 episode: "Tying the Not"
2009–2018; 2024	Grey's Anatomy	Dr. Arizona Robbins	Recurring role (Season 5); Main cast (Seasons 6–14); Guest star (Season 20); 214 episodes
2022	Tell Me Lies	CJ Albright	Recurring role (Season 1); 3 episodes
2025–present	9-1-1 Nashville	Blythe Hart	Main role; 18 episodes

== Awards and nominations ==
Year	Award	Category	Work	Result
2010	GLAAD Media Awards	Outstanding Drama Series	Grey's Anatomy	Nominated
2011	GLAAD Media Awards	Outstanding Drama Series	Grey's Anatomy	Nominated
2012	GLAAD Media Awards	Outstanding Drama Series	Grey's Anatomy	Won
2013	GLAAD Media Awards	Outstanding Drama Series	Grey's Anatomy	Nominated
2013	People's Choice Awards	Favorite Network TV Drama	Grey's Anatomy	Won
2014	GLAAD Media Awards	Outstanding Drama Series	Grey's Anatomy	Nominated
2015	People's Choice Awards	Favorite Network TV Drama	Grey's Anatomy	Won
2016	People's Choice Awards	Favorite Network TV Drama	Grey's Anatomy	Won
2017	People's Choice Awards	Favorite Network TV Drama	Grey's Anatomy	Won
