= Ham on Rye (film) =

- Official poster
- Directed by: Tyler Taormina
- Written by: Tyler Taormina; Eric Berger
- Produced by: Kevin Anton; Michael Basta; Eric Berger; David Croley Broyles; David Entin; Carson Lund; Tyler Taormina; Sergio Uguet de Resayre
- Starring: Haley Bodell; Cole Devine
- Cinematography: Carson Lund
- Edited by: Kevin Anton
- Music by: Deuter
- Production companies: Tago Clearing Film Studio; Omnes Films
- Distributed by: Factory 25
- Release dates: February 8, 2019 (Santa Barbara International Film Festival); October 23, 2020 (United States)
- Running time: 85 minutes
- Country: United States
- Language: English

Ham on Rye is a 2019 American independent film directed by Tyler Taormina. An offbeat subversion of the coming-of-age genre, the film features an expansive ensemble cast of over 100 performers, including cameo appearances by actors Lori Beth Denberg, Danny Tamberelli, Aaron Schwartz, and Clayton Snyder.

The film had its world premiere on February 8, 2019 at the Santa Barbara International Film Festival and international premiere on August 10, 2019 at Locarno Festival in Switzerland. Factory 25 acquired the distribution rights and released the film theatrically on October 23, 2020.

== Plot ==
The film opens in a park at a child’s birthday party. Someone is attempting to light a firework for the kids’ amusement before the opening credits begin to roll.

All of the teenagers in Haley's hometown dress in their best clothing on what is said to be the most important day of their lives. With nervous excitement, they make a scattered pilgrimage across town, drawn to an unknown fate. Haley walks at a more reluctant pace, skeptical of the timeworn tradition and the bizarre coming-of-age ritual that awaits them at their destination. She vocalizes her concerns to her two friends, Trish and Gwen, who both laugh off her concerns and tell her to think about other things. One boy, Jim, while walking to Monty’s with his friends, suddenly has a suspected panic attack and lapses into muteness. His friends continue on to Monty’s without him after discussing what to do to help him.

When they finally arrive at Monty's, a local delicatessen, the clusters of teens join together in a surreal ceremony of food, dance, and romantic angst that will determine the course of their lives forever. Many of the teens are granted instantaneous escape from the clutches of suburbia while an unchosen few are left to dwell interminably in their vacant hometown.

Haley leaves Monty’s during the ritual and is later unable to get ahold of either Trish or Gwen, who were both selected during a partner ritual. She walks home sullenly, calls her friends multiple times to no avail, and has an awkward dinner with her parents.

Jim is hospitalized with a broken leg after falling into a manhole, (supposedly trying to get to Monty’s). His clearly burdened, disappointed mother takes him out to dinner, then wheels him in a wheelchair to an abandoned warehouse, where she leaves him alone with a meager bag of supplies.

Three burnouts absentmindedly discuss their state of being while eating stolen Slim Jims in an empty parking lot. Then they listlessly ride hoverboards around before returning to the car, where they drive to a party attended by other people with similar situations. The adult guests of the party are presumably kids who were not selected during the ritual at Monty’s and are now living unsuccessful, unfulfilled lives. One of them is an aspiring guitarist who works at Monty’s, though he clearly hates his job. Realizing he’ll never be a musician and be stuck at Monty’s for good, he burns the strings of his guitar and then smashes it with his foot while his burnout buddies drive him home.

The next morning, Haley attempts getting a hold of her friends again, goes to their houses, but is still unable to reach them. She goes to the park, seen at the beginning of the film, and observes the people around her as the child’s party continues.

== Cast ==
- Haley Bodell as Haley
- Cole Devine as Sloan
- Lev Cameron as Squirgly Dag
- Dan Jablons as Mr. Monty
- Audrey Boos as Gwen
- Gabriella Herrera as Trish
- Luke Darga as Tommy
- Adam Torres as Marick
- Blake Borders as Jim
- Sam Hernandez as Artie
- Gregory Falatek as Garth
- Timothy Taylor as Bronco
- Laura Wernette as Dorothy
- David Croley Broyles as Ollie
- Drew Dammron as Snake
- Aaron Schwartz as Uno Bro
- Lori Beth Denberg as Smoker Playing Uno
- Danny Tamberelli as Man Playing Uno
- Clayton Snyder as Stoned Uno

== Production ==
The film was shot in about two weeks on a RED Scarlet X 4K camera. The film contains over a hundred cast members and sixty locations.

Tyler Taormina says of the look and feel of the film:

It was really important for us to evoke the 60s, the 70s, the 80s, and the 90s. We wanted them all to be compiled in this aesthetic that was sheer nostalgia.

Director of Photography, Carson Lund, describes the stylistic choices as:

... an eccentric middle ground between art cinema polish and the simplicity of Nickelodeon shows Tyler and I fondly recall from our youth.

== Reception ==
The film holds a 96% approval rating on Rotten Tomatoes, based on 23 reviews with an average rating of 7.8/10.

Richard Brody of The New Yorker commented in his review that the film "has an aching tenderness of a rare power" and that it "has the uncanny echo of a disturbing real-life dream".

K. Austin Collins of Rolling Stone acclaimed the film, calling it "one of a kind and completely unforgettable".

Linda Keršnerová of Mubi praised the film as "wildly enjoyable" and "a distinctive and fresh piece of cinematic art" in her review from the 72nd annual Locarno Festival.

Chuck Bowen of Slant Magazine lauded the film as "elegant, grand" and noted that "Ham on Rye’s aesthetic is breathtaking, especially considering the film’s shoestring production".

In Glenn Kenny's Critic's Pick review for The New York Times, he calls the film "impressive... disquieting and poignant".

Ty Burr of The Boston Globe writes in his review that the film is "haunting and hard-to-pigeonhole... a work of gentle, genuine American surrealism".

Caleb Hammond of MovieMaker Magazine called the film "delightful" in his round-up of the Santa Barbara International Film Festival 2019.
