= Brian Skeet =

English director, writer, producer, and cinematographer

Brian Skeet is an English director, writer, producer, and cinematographer. His work includes Documentaries, Films and Short films, a lot of it touching on romance and the HIV/AIDS crisis.

== Biography ==
Skeet was born on November 21, 1965, in London. His father was a tailor and he attended high school in Maine. He acted in the musical Anything Goes. At 17 years old he directed his first film - a student production of The Normal Heart. He attended university at Cambridge, and while studying, played Max in a performance of The Homecoming. Skeet achieved a First with honors and graduated, subsequently working for the BBC. He worked with Peter Sellars to direct a production of The Merchant of Venice. After quitting his job at the BBC he made his first short film, The Boy Who Fell In Love, which he followed up by directing The Misadventures of Margaret, which was received well at the Sundance Film Festival. He has been married to Terry Cummings since November 22, 2008, who has worked on writing several of his films.

== Filmography ==
Year	Film	Role(s)	Type
1991	Performance	Assistant director	TV series
1992	Omnibus	Producer	TV series documentary
1993	One Foot in the Past	Director	TV series documentary
1994	Arena	Director	TV series documentary
1994	The Boy Who Fell in Love	Director	Short Film
1998	The Misadventures of Margaret	Director, writer	Film
1999	The Weekend	Director, writer	Film
2003	The God of Small Tales	Director, Cinematographer	Short Film
2008	Keepers of the Gate	Special thanks	Short Film
2017	In The Morning	Writer	Short Film
2017	Leoni - the girl with incredibly big hair	Director, writer, Producer	
2017	Broken hearts: A love story	Director, writer, Producer	Short Film
2020	Wake Up To Love	Director, writer	Film
2020	Stop and Smell the Roses	Director	Film
	Disoriented	Writer, producer	
	White Lillies		
	The Life and Death of Martin Lazlo	Writer, producer	Film
