= The Quick and the Dead (1987 film) =

1987 TV film

- DVD cover
- Genre: Western
- Based on: The Quick and the Dead by Louis L'Amour
- Written by: James Lee Barrett
- Directed by: Robert Day
- Starring: Sam Elliott; Tom Conti; Kate Capshaw; Kenny Morrison; Matt Clark
- Music by: Steve Dorff
- Country of origin: United States
- Original language: English

Production
- Executive producer: Joseph Cates
- Producer: Phillip Cates
- Cinematography: Dick Bush
- Editor: Jay Freund
- Running time: 90 minutes
- Production companies: HBO Pictures; The Joseph Cates Company

Original release
- Network: HBO
- Release: February 28, 1987

The Quick and the Dead is a 1987 American made-for-television Western film based on the 1973 novel by Louis L'Amour, starring Sam Elliott, Tom Conti, and Kate Capshaw, and broadcast on HBO. Directed by Robert Day, it also stars Kenny Morrison and Matt Clark.

== Plot ==
In Wyoming Territory in 1876, Duncan McKaskel, his wife Susanna, and their 12-year-old son Tom are travelling West to start a new life. They have left a cholera-stricken wagon train and arrive in a small, dilapidated town, where they meet villainous "Doc" Shabbitt and ask for directions. He suggests they stay in a deserted local building, but McKaskel senses danger, so they leave. Shabbitt and his gang steal two of McKaskel's horses.

Con Vallian is chasing a mixed-race Native American, called "the Ute," who is the latest recruit to Shabbitt's gang. Vallian's mother was a Blackfoot who died at the hands of the Ute's tribe. Vallian witnesses the homesteader's encounter with Shabbitt and arrives at the McKaskel's wagon. He notifies them their horses have been stolen. Against Susanna's advice, Duncan rides into town and tries to reclaim the horses. An intense gunfight ensues when Vallian, who has secretly followed him, shoots some of the Shabbitt gang. When Doc Shabbitt discovers his son died in the gunfight, he vows to pursue the family and seek revenge.

The McKaskels try to outrun their pursuers, while Vallian continues to help protect them from Shabbitt and his gang. Vallian eliminates the gang until only Shabbitt, the Ute and two other henchmen remain. Vallian is attracted to Susanna, and she to him. Following a moment of high drama, in which Shabbitt's henchman, Red, is severely beaten by Susanna, she succumbs to Vallian's advances, and they share a passionate kiss. McKaskel never learns of the kiss, but several times he tells Vallian, who is critical of his apparent pacifism, to back off. In an encounter with Native Americans, Susanna learns that her brother, an army officer, has likely been killed at the Battle of the Little Bighorn.

Out hunting, Vallian is ambushed and shot by the Ute. McKaskel removes the bullet, but Vallian runs a high fever and falls on the trail. He is rescued and nursed back to health by Susanna.

Eventually, they arrive at the small cabin Susanna's brother had built for them, on the spread where they intended to raise cattle. The family begins settling in the house, but Shabbitt and his remaining gang arrive for their revenge. A showdown ensues in which Vallian and the McKaskels triumph. As Vallian bids farewell to the family, McKaskel throws a haymaker, knocking a surprised Vallian to the ground. The punch signals to Vallian that McKaskel, although appreciative of Vallian's efforts to help his family, will stand up for himself when necessary. The two men smile and Vallian rides off.

== Cast ==
- Sam Elliott as Con Vallian
- Tom Conti as Duncan McKaskel
- Kate Capshaw as Susanna McKaskel
- Kenny Morrison as Tom McKaskel
- Matt Clark as "Doc" Shabbitt
- Jerry Potter as "Red" Hayle
- Patrick Kilpatrick as The Ute
- Billy Streater as Ike Mantle
- Del Shores as Purdy Mantle
- Jeffrey Meyer as "Butcher" McCloud
- R.L. Tolbert as Johnny Dobbs
- Kurt D. Lott as Lenny Shabitt, Doc's Son
- Larry Sellers as Running Wolf
- Bill Stedman as The Bartender
- Hardy Rawls as Joy, The Blacksmith

== Production ==
Filming locations include Coconino National Forest, Kaibab National Forest, Wupatki National Monument and Sedona, Arizona.
