= David Denby =

American film critic (born 1943)

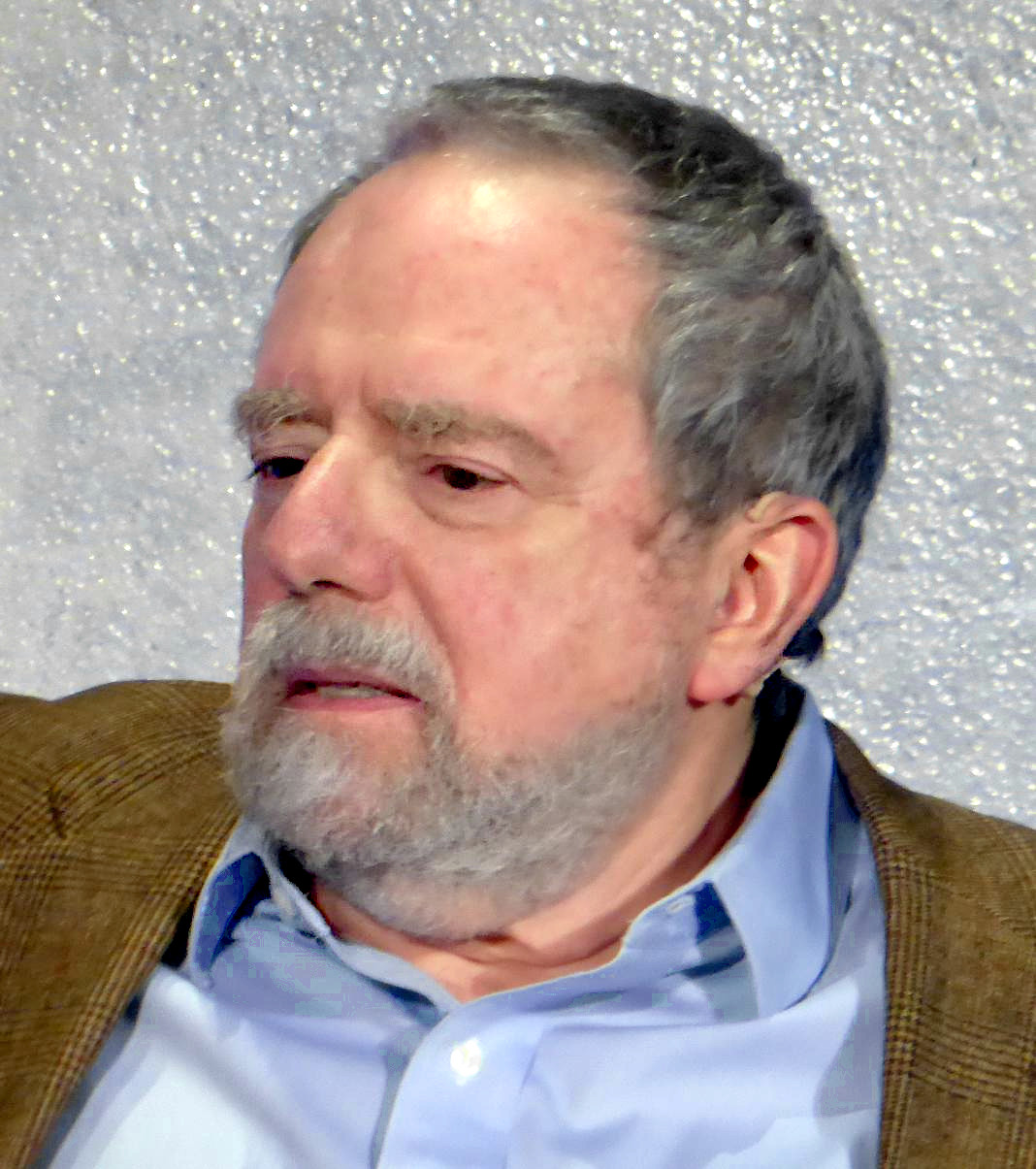
- Denby in 2016
- Born: 1943 (age 82–83); New York City, U.S.
- Education: Columbia University (BA, MA)
- Occupations: Film critic, journalist
- Spouses: Cathleen Schine (m. 1981; div. 2000); Susan Rieger (m. 2004)
- Children: 2

David Denby (born 1943) is an American journalist. He was a film critic at The New Yorker magazine until December 2014.

== Early life and education ==
Denby grew up in New York City. He received a B.A. from Columbia University in 1965 and a master's degree from its journalism school in 1966.

== Career ==
=== Journalism ===
Denby began writing film criticism while a graduate student at Stanford University's Department of Communication. He began his professional life in the early 1970s as an adherent of the film critic Pauline Kael—one of a group of film writers informally, and sometimes derisively, known as "the Paulettes." Denby wrote for The Atlantic Monthly, the Boston Phoenix, and New York before arriving at The New Yorker. His first article for the magazine was published in 1993, and beginning in 1998, he served as a staff writer and film critic, alternating his critical duties week by week with Anthony Lane.

Denby participated in the 2012 Sight & Sound critics' poll, where he listed his ten favorite films as follows: L'Avventura, Citizen Kane, The Godfather Part II, Journey to Italy, The Life of Oharu, The Rules of the Game, Seven Samurai, Sunrise, The Tree of Life, and Vertigo.

In December 2014, it was announced that Denby would step down as film critic in early 2015, continuing with The New Yorker as a staff writer.

=== Books ===
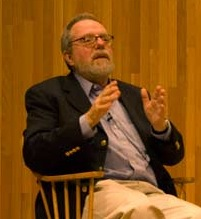
Denby speaking at the Berkeley School of Journalism, 2009

Denby's Great Books (1996) is a non-fiction account of the Western canon-oriented Core Curriculum at his alma mater, Columbia University. In The New York Times, the writer Joyce Carol Oates called the book "a lively adventure of the mind," filled with "unqualified enthusiasm." Great Books was a New York Times bestseller. In The Modern Mind: An Intellectual History of the 20th century, Peter Watson called "Great Books" the "most original response to the culture wars." The book has been published in 13 foreign editions.

In 2004, Denby published American Sucker, a memoir which details his investment misadventures in the dot-com stock market bubble, along with his own bust years as a divorcé from writer Cathleen Schine, leading to a major reassessment of his life. Allan Sloan in The New York Times called the author "formidably smart," while noting this paradox: "Mr. Denby is even smart enough to realize how paradoxical it is that he not only has a good, prestigious job, but that he is also in a position to make money by relating how he lost money in the stock market."

Snark, published in 2009, is Denby's polemical dissection of the spread of low, annihilating sarcasm in the Internet and in public speech. In 2012, Denby collected his best film writing in Do the Movies Have a Future?

Denby’s next book, Lit Up: One Reporter. Three Schools. Twenty-four Books That Can Change Lives, published in 2016, is a kind of prequel to Great Books. It dramatizes the kind of reading and teaching can turn tenth-graders into lifetime readers. USA Today (February 17, 2016) described it as “by turns funny, bracing and utterly absorbing, it is that rare journalism artifact: a hopeful book about adolescence that doesn’t whitewash the nasty bits.”

Denby is married to novelist Susan Rieger, author of The Divorce Papers (2014), The Heirs (2017), and Like Mother, Like Mother (Fall, 2024).

== Reception ==
David Denby has faced recurring criticism for delivering harshly negative reviews that some see as reflexive, joyless, or driven by a desire to appear discerning rather than genuine engagement.

Reviewers have described his work as conveying “terrible, terrible boredom” with both films and the task of criticism itself—marked by a detached, blasé tone that prioritizes intellectual skepticism over passion or accessibility. He has panned popular or acclaimed films (e.g., initially dismissing The Big Lebowski as incoherent and pointless) while focusing on cynicism, pretension, or emotional hollowness in works like Apocalypse Now and blockbusters.

This reputation intensified with his 2009 book Snark, which decried mean-spirited, knowing abuse in criticism and online discourse—prompting accusations of hypocrisy given his own sharp, elitist-leaning style.

While respected for evocative prose, Denby embodies the critique of elite reviewers as habitually contrarian, valuing elevated dismissal over enthusiasm.
