= Destry Spielberg =

American filmmaker

- Born: December 1, 1996 (age 29); Los Angeles, California, U.S.
- Occupation: Film director
- Years active: 2019–present
- Partner: Jacob Herskowitz (m. 2026)
- Parents: Steven Spielberg; Kate Capshaw
- Relatives: Sasha Spielberg (sister); Sawyer Spielberg (brother); Jessica Capshaw (half-sister); Arnold Spielberg (grandfather)

Destry Allyn Spielberg (born December 1, 1996) is an American film director and actress. The daughter of filmmaker Steven Spielberg and actress Kate Capshaw, she began her career with minor acting roles and production work before transitioning into directing. Her short film Let Me Go (The Right Way) (2022) premiered at the Tribeca Festival and earned accolades at several independent festivals. She made her feature directorial debut with Please Don't Feed the Children (2024), a psychological thriller that was released by Tubi. Known for drawing on her upbringing on film sets, Spielberg has stated a commitment to championing new and lesser-known talent in her films.

== Life ==
Destry Allyn Spielberg was born on December 1, 1996 in Los Angeles and is the youngest biological child of director Steven Spielberg and his second wife, actress Kate Capshaw. She has three sisters—Sasha and Mikaela Spielberg, and half-sister Jessica Capshaw—and three brothers: Sawyer and Theo Spielberg, and half-brother Max Spielberg. After an accident ended her pursuit of an equestrian career, she shifted her focus to filmmaking. At age 19, she worked as a model for DT Model Management. She was engaged to actor Genc Tairi. In February 2026, Spielberg got engaged to Jacob Herskowitz after more than three years of dating. They were married in September 2026.

As a child, she recalled being frightened by the realistic surgical scene in A.I. Artificial Intelligence (2001), which served as an early introduction to practical effects and filmmaking. Spielberg has credited growing up on film sets, often in place of traditional schooling, as the foundation for her immersive understanding of filmmaking.

== Career ==
Spielberg played minor roles in I Know This Much Is True and Licorice Pizza and has done production assistant and props work on her father's films. Finding limited success with acting, she produced, directed and starred in her own short film, Rosie, in 2019, which screened at the Soho International Film Festival.

In 2022, she directed the short film Let Me Go (The Right Way), starring Brian d'Arcy James, which premiered at Tribeca and won Best Thriller at City of Angels Women's Film Festival. The short, which starred Sean Penn's son, Hopper Penn, and was written by Stephen King's son Owen King, attracted criticism from Franklin Leonard and sparked accusations of nepotism. Spielberg denied this, acknowledging her privileges, and citing her struggles but later deleted the tweet. The short was viewed by Basil Iwanyk, who offered her first movie. In December 2022, it was announced she would direct Four Assassins (And A Funeral) for Thunder Road Films.

In 2024, she made her feature film directorial debut with Please Don't Feed the Children, starring Michelle Dockery, premiered at the 57th Sitges Film Festival on October 11, 2024, and began streaming exclusively on Tubi in June 2025. Several crew members and vendors had not received payment as of 2024.
