= Regan Aliyah =

American entertainer

- Born: Los Angeles, California, U.S.
- Education: San Jose State University (B.A.)
- Occupations: Actress; singer; producer; dancer
- Years active: 2016–present

Regan Aliyah is an American actress, singer, producer, and dancer. She is best known for her role as Juliana Porter in the Netflix series XO, Kitty and Zelma Stanton in the Disney+ miniseries Ironheart.

== Early life ==
Aliyah was born in Los Angeles, California to a poor family. Her grandmother was a librarian and her grand-aunt was a cafeteria worker. She attended San José State University where she graduated with a Bachelor of Arts in Communication Studies.

== Career ==
One of her first roles was playing the lead role of Ashley in the short film How to Catch a Ghost. She made her film debut in the psychological thriller Please Don't Feed the Children, portraying Vicky. She had a recurring role as Zelma Stanton in the Disney+ miniseries Ironheart. She had a main role as Juliana Porter in the Netflix series XO, Kitty. She made a guest role as Nadine in the CBS series NCIS.

== Personal life ==
Aliyah is openly a lesbian and is in a relationship with MMA fighter, Natalie Schlesinger.

== Filmography ==
=== Film ===
Year	Title	Role	Notes
2016	How to Catch a Ghost	Ashley	Short film
2024	Please Don't Feed the Children	Vicky	

=== Television ===
Year	Title	Role	Notes
2023	XO, Kitty	Juliana Porter	Main role
2025	Ironheart	Zelma Stanton	Recurring role
2026	NCIS	Nadine	Episode: Reboot
