= Nightstream =

American online film festival

Nightstream was an online film festival, launched in the United States in 2020. Created as a partnership of several horror and fantasy film festivals as a response to the cancellation of their regular events due to the COVID-19 pandemic in the United States, the festival presented a streaming lineup of horror, fantasy and other genre films in October 2020.

Participating festivals were the Boston Underground Film Festival, the Brooklyn Horror Film Festival, the North Bend Film Festival, the Overlook Film Festival and Popcorn Frights.

The opening film of the 2020 edition was Aneesh Chaganty's Run. Other films screened included 32 Malasaña Street, Honeydew, My Heart Can't Beat Unless You Tell It To, The Queen of Black Magic and Boys from County Hell. The program also included online parties, a virtual festival lounge, and a talk by American Psycho director Mary Harron.

Organizers announced that Nightstream would be staged again in October 2021. Films screened in 2021 included Cosmic Dawn, To the Moon, Hellbender and All My Friends Hate Me.

In 2023, the Nightstream platform was relaunched as a video on demand service for genre films. On October 31, 2023, Nightstream officially transitioned from a seasonal virtual festival into a year‑round curated transactional video‑on‑demand (TVOD) platform, offering horror, sci‑fi, fantasy, and indie genre films available to rent or buy.
