= Cathleen Schine =

American novelist

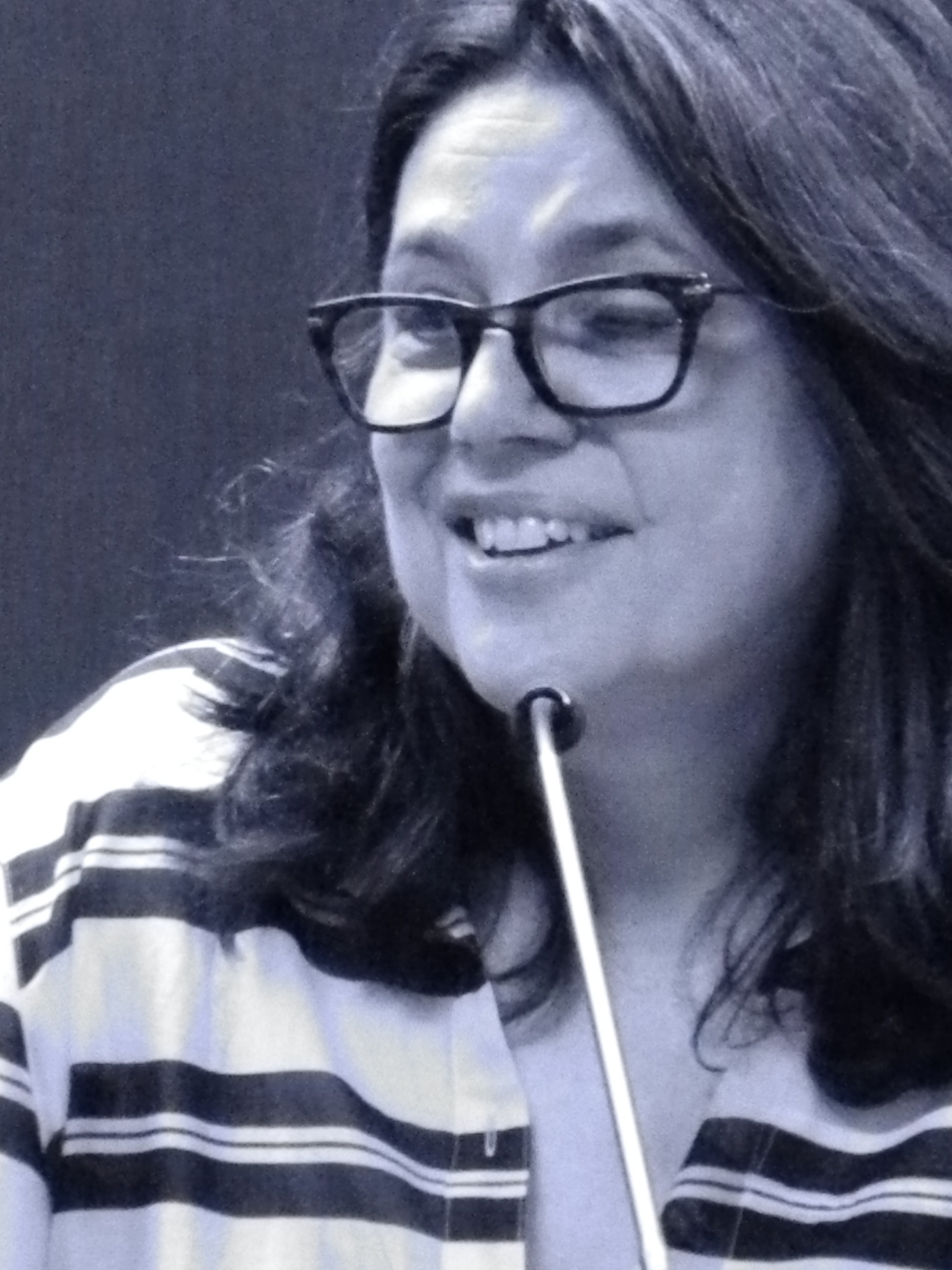
- Schine at New York book signing, Barnes & Noble
- Born: 1953 (age 72–73)
- Education: Barnard College (BA)

Cathleen Schine (born 1953) is an American novelist.

Schine received her B.A. from Barnard College in 1975.

Her first book was Alice in Bed (1983), which was followed by To the Birdhouse (1990), Rameau's Niece (1993), The Love Letter (1995) and The Evolution of Jane (1998). The Love Letter was filmed in 1999. Rameau's Niece was filmed as The Misadventures of Margaret starring Parker Posey. She Is Me was released in 2003, and The New Yorkers in early 2007. Her novel The Three Weissmanns of Westport, published in February 2010, was dubbed "compulsively readable" by Publishers Weekly. Fin & Lady was published in 2013.

Schine also wrote a Sunday Serial for The New York Times Sunday Magazine, The Dead and the Naked, which ran beginning September 9, 2007, and was published in Italy as "Miss S." One character, Miss Skattergoods, also appears in The Love Letter.

Schine's work appears frequently in The New York Review of Books, The New Yorker and other publications. Her essay "Dog Trouble", which was originally published in The New Yorker, was included in The Best American Essays of 2005. A humor piece, "Save Our Bus Herds", was included in the anthology Fierce Pajamas: An Anthology of Humor Writing From The New Yorker. Her novel They May Not Mean To, But They Do, published in 2016, won the 2016 Ferro-Grumley Award for LGBTQ Fiction.

Her most recent novel is Künstlers in Paradise (2023).

Reviewer Leah Rozen in People magazine dubbed her "a modern-day Jewish Jane Austen."

Her ex-husband is the New Yorker film critic David Denby. Schine now lives in Venice, California with her wife, Janet Meyers.

== Bibliography ==
- Alice in Bed (1983)
- To the Birdhouse (1990)
- Rameau's Niece (1993)
- The Love Letter (1995)
- The Evolution of Jane (1998)
- She is Me (2001)
- The New Yorkers (2007)
- The Three Weissmanns of Westport (2010)
- Fin and Lady (2013)
- They May Not Mean To, But They Do (2016)
- The Grammarians (2019)
- Künstlers in Paradise (Henry Holt & Company, 2023)

== Articles ==
- "Dog Trouble" - The New Yorker
- "Save our Bus Herds" - The New Yorker
- "'The Trump Castle,' a Novel" - The New York Times
- "CHILDREN'S BOOKS; AMERICA AS FAIRYLAND" - The New York Times
- "ENDPAPER; How Do I Join" - The New York Times
- "ENDPAPER; Spiro Agnew and I" - The New York Times
- "ENDPAPER; The 13th Sign" - The New York Times
- "ENDPAPER; Unwanted Poem Tendencies" - The New York Times
- "FLOOR WARS" - The New York Times
- "FROM LASSIE TO PEE-WEE" - The New York Times
- "GUEST OBSERVER; A Time for Watches" - The New York Times
- "Status is ... for Manhattan Parents; A Kid Who Curls Up With the Classics" - The New York Times
- "The Way We Live Now: 7-4-99: Urban Diarist; Tanning and Authenticity" - The New York Times
- "ENDPAPER; How Do I Join?" - The New York Times
- "Betrayal, Friendship And Nuance" - The New York Times
- "ENDPAPER; The Bluegrass Is Greener" - The New York Times
- "ON LANGUAGE; 'Hopefully' Springs Eternal" - The New York Times
- "ENDPAPER; Joined at the Hip" - The New York Times
- "ON LANGUAGE; Dying Metaphors Take Flight" - The New York Times
- "HITTING THE BEACH WITH GRANDMA" - The New York Times
- "Endpaper; Thinking About You" - The New York Times
