= Aaron Schwartz (American actor) =

American actor

- Occupation: Actor
- Years active: 1989–present

Aaron Schwartz is an American actor, known for playing the lead role of Gerald Garner in the 1995 comedy film Heavyweights, and for the role of Dave Karp in the 1992 Walt Disney film The Mighty Ducks. In addition to his two film roles, Schwartz played Clem Lanell in eight episodes of The Adventures of Pete & Pete, and appeared in one episode of The Cosby Show. He had a recurring role as doorman Vanya on The CW's teen drama series Gossip Girl and its spin-off web series Chasing Dorota.

== Award nominations ==
Schwartz, together with the rest of the young cast of The Mighty Ducks, was nominated for the Outstanding Young Ensemble Cast in a Motion Picture award at the 14th Youth in Film Awards (1991–1992).

== Filmography ==
=== Film ===
Year	Title	Role	Notes
1992	The Mighty Ducks	Dave Karp	
1995	Heavyweights	Gerald "Gerry" Garner	
2011	Third Down	Chris	Short film
2011	Stray	Holland	Short film
2011	Evil	Famine	Short film
2017	Guardians of the Galaxy Vol. 2	Young Ego	Facial Reference
2018	Ham on Rye	Uno Bro	
2020	Adverse	Detective Mitchell	

=== Television ===
Year	Title	Role	Notes
1989	The Cosby Show	—N/a	Episode: "Shall We Dance?"
1993–1994	The Adventures of Pete & Pete	Clem Lanell	8 episodes
2009	The Guiding Light	Dr. Mansfield	2 episodes
2009–2012	Gossip Girl	Vanya	15 episodes
2010	Law & Order	Bomb squad cop	Episode: "Rubber Room"
2011	Suits	Interviewee #1	Episode: "Pilot"
2012	Made in Jersey	Ted	Episode: "Wingman"
2013	The Originals	Handsome man	Episode: "Always and Forever"
2018	Young Sheldon	Marcus	Episode: "A Dog, a Squirrel, and a Fish Named Fish"
2019	The Kominsky Method	Walter	Episode: "Chapter 16: A Thetan Arrives"
2019	Last Chance	Glam	TV movie
2020	S.W.A.T.	Beau	Episode: "Wild Ones"
2020	Fame at a Deadly Cost	D. C.	TV movie
2021	Gossip Girl	Vanya	Episode: "Final Cancellation"
2022	The Young and the Restless	Lucas	

=== Web ===
Year	Title	Role	Notes
2009	Chasing Dorota	Vanya	6 episodes

== See also ==
- List of Gossip Girl Guest stars
