= The Picture Maker =

2025 artwork by Kate Capshaw

- The Picture Maker includes a portrait of Steven Spielberg and a single-channel video projection
- Artist: Kate Capshaw
- Year: 2025
- Medium: Oil on linen, video projection
- Subject: Steven Spielberg
- Location: National Portrait Gallery, Washington, D.C.

The Picture Maker is a 2025 artwork by Kate Capshaw of her husband, filmmaker Steven Spielberg. It was commissioned by the National Portrait Gallery as part of the exhibition "Portrait of a Nation: 2025 Honorees". The artwork includes a portrait of Spielberg against a black background and a single-channel video projection with excerpts from films Spielberg shot during his youth, including scenes from his 1964 directorial debut Firelight.

== Background ==
Retired actress Kate Capshaw, the wife of American filmmaker Steven Spielberg, began taking art classes in 2001 with her daughter after Spielberg observed their children had a talent with drawing, noting "This might be coming from your side — have you ever taken a class?" Capshaw's interest in drawing and painting came later in life, partly due to a lack of available art electives at her school in Ferguson, Missouri. While learning to paint, Capshaw focused on portraying faces due to decades of experience capturing people's emotions not only through acting, but also through photography.

By 2016 her interest was painting people who are not commonly portrayed, including those experiencing homelessness. She painted eight large portraits of homeless youth for the Hope Center in Los Angeles and later painted around a dozen more for the series "Unaccompanied". Kim Sajet, then-director of the National Portrait Gallery (NPG) in Washington, D.C., and curator Dorothy Moss took an interest in Capshaw's paintings and encouraged her to enter her work in the Outwin Boochever Portrait Competition. Capshaw was chosen as a finalist and three of her portraits were exhibited in 2019 at the NPG.

== Commission and exhibition ==
In 2022 the NPG commissioned Capshaw to paint a portrait of Spielberg. She wanted a more intimate portrayal of her husband, saying "I wasn't going to put a camera in the portrait, and I wasn't going to put him on a director's chair, and he wasn't going to wear a baseball cap. I wasn't going to have ET flying in." She used a photograph of him sitting in their breakfast nook, smiling, and portrayed against a black background. Because Spielberg is not portrayed as a filmmaker, Capshaw opted to include another aspect to her work.

In addition to the oil on linen portrait, her artwork The Picture Maker includes excerpts of 8 mm, 16 mm, and 35 mm films Spielberg shot during his teens, including some never-before-seen footage and scenes from Spielberg's 1964 directorial debut Firelight, on a single-channel video projection. According to Capshaw, the footage shows inspiration for Spielberg's later films, including The Sugarland Express, West Side Story, and the Indiana Jones series.

The Picture Maker was first exhibited in 2025 as part of the NPG's "Portrait of a Nation: 2025 Honorees". The four works are on display in the NPG from December 2025 to November 2026. The three other works in the exhibition are a photograph of Jamie Dimon by Jason Alden, a portrait of Temple Grandin by David Lenz, and a drawing of Joy Harjo by Joel Daniel Phillips.
