= A Girl Thing =

2001 film by Lee Rose

- Genre: Drama, romance
- Created by: Lee Rose
- Screenplay by: Lee Rose
- Directed by: Lee Rose
- Starring: Kate Capshaw; Stockard Channing; Rebecca De Mornay; Mia Farrow; Elizabeth Franz; Irma P. Hall; Linda Hamilton; Glenne Headly
- Theme music composer: Terence Blanchard
- Country of origin: United States
- Original language: English

Production
- Producer: Cydney Bernard
- Cinematography: Eric Van Haren Noman
- Editor: Christopher Rouse
- Running time: 237 minutes

Original release
- Network: Showtime
- Release: January 20 – January 27, 2001

A Girl Thing is a 2001 American television drama film directed by Lee Rose. Consisting of four separate stories, the film premiered on Showtime on January 20, 2001, and concluded on January 27. The ensemble cast includes Stockard Channing, Kate Capshaw, Elle Macpherson, Glenne Headly, Rebecca De Mornay, Allison Janney, Mia Farrow, Lynn Whitfield, Linda Hamilton, Camryn Manheim, and S. Epatha Merkerson.

== Plot ==
The stories involve patients of psychiatrist Dr. Beth Noonan. The first part is about an attorney (Lauren Travis) who has problems with intimacy and realizes that she is attracted to another woman (Casey Montgomery), an advertising executive. The second is an angry woman (Helen McCormack) and her sisters (Kim and Kathy McCormack) who must all learn to get along to receive inheritances from their deceased mother. The third is a wife (Nia Morgan) who enlists the help of her husband's mistress (Betty McCarthy) and a decoy (Rachel Logan) in taking revenge against him. In the fourth story, Beth Noonan is held captive by a mentally disturbed patient (Suzanne Nabor).

== Cast and characters ==
- Kate Capshaw as Casey Montgomery
- Stockard Channing as Dr. Beth Noonan
- Rebecca De Mornay as Kim McCormack
- Mia Farrow as Betty McCarthy
- Elizabeth Franz as Josephine McCormack
- Irma P. Hall as Alice, the housekeeper
- Linda Hamilton as Rachel Logan
- Glenne Headly as Helen McCormack
- Allison Janney as Kathy McCormack
- Tina Lifford as Sharon
- Elle Macpherson as Lauren Travis
- Camryn Manheim as Suzanne Nabor
- Margo Martindale as May
- S. Epatha Merkerson as Lani
- Kelly Rowan as Claire
- Lynn Whitfield as Nia Morgan
- Peta Wilson as Alex
- Scott Bakula as Paul Morgan
- Bruce Greenwood as Frank
- Brian Kerwin as Gary Tucker

== Reception ==
The film received positive reviews from critics.
