= Winter (indie rock band) =

Brazilian indie-rock band

- Origin: Boston, Massachusetts
- Genres: Dream pop, shoegaze, indie rock, indie pop
- Years active: 2012–present
- Labels: Lolipop Records, Everything Is Blue, Bar/None Records, Winspear

Winter is an American bilingual dream pop/indie rock band led by Samira Winter, Nolan Eley, Kyle Oppenheimer, and Ana Karina.

== History ==
Samira Winter was born in Curitiba, Brazil in 1991 to a Brazilian mother and an American father. She moved to Los Angeles, California, in order to get into college. She formed the band Winter in Boston in 2012, comprising Samira Winter, Nolan Eley, Kyle Oppenheimer, and Ana Karina. and they released the four-song EP Daydreaming the following year through Lolipop Records. The band's next release was 2014's Tudo Azul, also a four-song EP; most of the lyrics on this release are in Portuguese.

Winter's debut full-length studio album, Supreme Blue Dream, was released in 2015. The band embarked on a two-year international tour to support the album, touring mostly through the US, Brazil and Argentina. Between 2016 and 2018, while still touring to support Supreme Blue Dream, Winter released several standalone singles. They toured with Summer Twins during this period.

Also during this period, Samira Winter self-recorded several solo songs and placed them online. The songs were mostly promoted in the Brazilian press due to their Portuguese lyrics. Winter's second studio album, Ethereality, was released in 2018. Samira Winter and her sister formed their own label, Everything Blue Records, to release the album. The band's third studio album, Endless Space (Between You & I) was released in 2020. The band released their fourth studio album, What Kind of Blue Are You?, on October 14, 2022. The band's fifth studio album, Adult Romantix, was released on August 22, 2025.

== Discography ==
=== Studio albums ===
Year	Album
2015	Supreme Blue Dream: Released: March 10, 2015 (Worldwide); Label: Lolipop Records
2018	Ethereality: Released: April 6, 2018 (Worldwide); Label: Everything Blue Records
2020	Endless Space (Between You & I): Released: July 24, 2020 (Worldwide); Label: Bar/None Records
2022	What Kind of Blue Are You?: Released: October 14, 2022 (Worldwide); Label: Bar/None Records
2025	Adult Romantix: Released: August 22, 2025 (Worldwide); Label: Winspear

=== Extended plays ===
Year	Album
2012	Daydreaming: Released: December 24, 2012 (USA); Label: Lolipop Records
2014	Tudo Azul: Released: June 5, 2014 (USA); Label: Lolipop Records
2024	…and she’s still listening: Released: May 24, 2024 (USA); Label: Everything Blue Records

=== Compilation appearances ===
Year	Album
2012	Puddles (Spring Compilation #1): Song: Six Years Later (with Lorena); Released: April 2, 2012 (Worldwide); Label: Practice Room Records
2013	The Le Sigh Vol.1: Song: Find Me; Released: November 18, 2013 (Worldwide); Label: Birdtapes
2014	Pie (Spring Compilation #2.5): Song: The View; Released: June 33, 2014 (Worldwide); Label: Practice Room Records
2016	Secret Admirer: Song: New Year; Released: February 14, 2016 (Worldwide); Label: Practice Room Records
2016	BERN YR IDOLS: Song: Find Me; Released: March 27, 2016 (Worldwide); Label: Audio Antihero
2018	Decay (Spring Compilation #3): Song: Just Stay; Released: May 18, 2018 (Worldwide); Label: Practice Room Records
2018	The Desperation Club - A Cloud Tribute Album: Song: Lovelow; Released: June 14, 2018 (Worldwide); Label: Audio Antihero
