= The Locusts (film) =

- Theatrical release poster
- Directed by: John Patrick Kelley
- Written by: John Patrick Kelley
- Produced by: Adam Duritz; Cynthia Guidry; Charles B. Wessler; Beth Holden-Garland; Brad Krevoy; Steve Stabler; Bradley Thomas
- Starring: Kate Capshaw; Jeremy Davies; Vince Vaughn; Paul Rudd; Daniel Meyer; Ashley Judd
- Cinematography: Phedon Papamichael Jr.
- Edited by: Erica Flaum, Kathryn Himoff
- Music by: Carter Burwell
- Production companies: Orion Pictures; Renegade Films
- Distributed by: MGM Distribution Co. (United States and Canada); Columbia TriStar Film Distributors International (international)
- Release date: October 3, 1997
- Running time: 124 minutes
- Country: United States
- Language: English

The Locusts is a 1997 American Gothic neo-noir film written and directed by John Patrick Kelley, and starring Vince Vaughn, Jeremy Davies, Kate Capshaw, Paul Rudd, and Ashley Judd. The score was composed by Carter Burwell.

The film focuses on a drifter who finds work on a cattle ranch in a small Kansas town embellished with secrets.

== Plot ==
In 1955, drifter Clay Hewitt wanders into a small Kansas town seeking employment to finance a visit to his older brother in California. He develops a relationship with local beauty queen Kitty and befriends farmhand Earl, who gets him a job at a local cattle farm owned by wealthy widow Delilah Ashford Potts, known for maintaining sexual relationships with her young employees. Delilah's husband committed suicide after catching her cheating on him. Clay rejects Delilah's advances, and quickly develops a rivalry with her latest lover, Joel Carter.

Clay befriends Delilah's sensitive and introverted son, Joseph "Flyboy" Potts, who has just returned from a psychiatric institution and whose only companion is his late father's aging pet bull. Flyboy was institutionalized for eight years after finding his father's corpse as a child, and is constantly emasculated by Delilah by being forced to cook and clean for the farmhands, who frequently mistreat him. Clay takes Flyboy under his wing and confides to him that his older brother died in an accident two years prior. At Clay's suggestion, Flyboy asks Delilah to be allowed to work with the animals at the farm. Delilah responds by having Joel tie up Flyboy and force him to watch as she castrates Flyboy's pet bull, which bleeds to death. Horrified by Delilah's cruelty, Joel ends their romance and leaves the farm, and Delilah departs soon afterwards for a business trip.

Clay admits to Kitty that he is on the run from the authorities after being wrongfully blamed for the death of an old girlfriend in his hometown – they were having sex in a pool when she slipped and broke her neck. He plans to skip town, and enlists her help to teach Flyboy how to stand up for himself before leaving. Kitty sets Flyboy up with one of her friends, but when she attempts to get intimate, Flyboy breaks down and admits to Clay that Delilah sexually abused him when he was a child and arranged for his father to catch them, driving him to suicide, for which Flyboy blames himself. Disgusted, Clay decides to take Flyboy with him.

While Flyboy and Kitty wait for him at the lake, Clay returns to the farm to retrieve his payment and is confronted by Delilah, who has learned about the criminal charges against him. Delilah reveals that she became pregnant from being raped by her father, whom she killed in a fit of rage. Her husband, an old friend of her father, agreed to marry her and raise Flyboy as his own child to spare her the shame, but Delilah could never bring herself to love either of them, and instead sought to destroy them. She blackmails Clay into having sex with her in exchange for not turning him in. Flyboy returns to the farm to search for Clay and finds him in bed with Delilah, as she had intended. Heartbroken, Flyboy commits suicide in the same manner as his father did. An enraged Clay goes after Delilah, but she shoots herself before he gets to her. Kitty arrives and comforts Clay as he mourns Flyboy's death, and they then leave town together.

== Cast ==
- Kate Capshaw as Delilah Ashford Potts
- Jeremy Davies as Joseph "Flyboy" Potts
- Vince Vaughn as Clay Hewitt
- Ashley Judd as Kitty
- Paul Rudd as Earl
- Daniel Meyer as Joel Carter
- Jessica Capshaw as Patsy
- Jess Robertson as Ellen
- Jimmy Pickens as Cameron
- Jerry Haynes as Harlen, The Bartender
- Jason Davis as Wrangler

== Reception ==
On Rotten Tomatoes the film has an approval rating of 20% based on reviews from 10 critics.

=== Bull castration controversy ===
A test screening experienced several audience members leaving the theater with their hands over their mouths after seeing a scene with a full graphic bull castration. MGM's marketing chief responded in the Los Angeles Times that the audience members must have reacted only "to what they expect to see" with MGM president of worldwide distribution Larry Gleeson adding "You can do anything to a human being [in a movie], but just don't hurt an animal."
