= The Misadventures of Margaret =

- Theatrical release poster
- Directed by: Brian Skeet
- Screenplay by: Brian Skeet
- Based on: Rameau's Niece by Cathleen Schine
- Produced by: Ian Benson; Nicolas Altmayer; Eric Altmayer
- Starring: Parker Posey; Jeremy Northam
- Cinematography: Romain Winding
- Edited by: Clare Douglas
- Music by: Saint Etienne; James Shearman
- Distributed by: Les Films Ariane
- Release dates: 23 December 1998 (France); 23 April 1999 (United Kingdom)
- Running time: 93 minutes
- Countries: France; United Kingdom
- Language: English

The Misadventures of Margaret is a 1998 French-British romantic comedy film directed by Brian Skeet and starring Parker Posey, Jeremy Northam and Craig Chester. It was based on the novel Rameau's Niece by Cathleen Schine. The film is about the bored wife of a Professor who decides to write an erotic novel.

== Cast ==
- Parker Posey as Margaret Nathan
- Jeremy Northam as Edward Nathan
- Craig Chester as Richard Lane
- Elizabeth McGovern as Till Turner
- Brooke Shields as Lily
- Corbin Bernsen as Art Turner
- Justine Waddell as Young Girl
- Patrick Bruel as Martin
- Stéphane Freiss as The Philosopher
- Amy Phillips as Sarah From Brighton
- Alexis Denisof as Dr. Lipi
- Sylvie Testud as Young Nun
- Al Mackenzie as Richard's Boyfriend
- Kerry Shale as Librarian
- Jeff Harding as Man at Party
- Jacey Sallés as Astronaught #1
- Teresa Gallagher as Astronaught #2
- Melanie Claus as Astronaught #3
- Danusio Salememoreia as French Gardner
- Charlie Waterman as Waitress / 18th Century Lesbian
- Oni Faida Lampley as Baroness
- Lawrence Davison as Young Girl's Uncle
- Chris Rice as Lily's Hunk
