= Christmas Eve in Miller's Point =

American film

- Theatrical release poster
- Directed by: Tyler Thomas Taormina
- Screenplay by: Eric Berger; Tyler Thomas Taormina
- Produced by: Krista Minto; Tyler Thomas Taormina; David Croley Broyles; Duncan Sullivan; Michael Cera
- Starring: Matilda Fleming; Maria Dizzia; Ben Shenkman; Francesca Scorsese; Elsie Fisher; Lev Cameron; Sawyer Spielberg; Gregg Turkington; Michael Cera
- Cinematography: Carson Lund
- Edited by: Kevin Anton
- Production companies: Omnes Films; Crypto Castle Productions; Puente Films
- Distributed by: IFC Films
- Release dates: May 17, 2024 (Cannes); November 8, 2024 (United States)
- Running time: 106 minutes
- Country: United States
- Language: English
- Box office: $226,182

Christmas Eve in Miller's Point is a 2024 American Christmas comedy drama film directed and produced by Tyler Thomas Taormina, who co-wrote the screenplay with Eric Berger. It stars Matilda Fleming, Maria Dizzia, Ben Shenkman, Francesca Scorsese, Elsie Fisher, Lev Cameron, Sawyer Spielberg, Gregg Turkington, and Michael Cera, who is also a producer on the film.

The film premiered at the 2024 Cannes Film Festival on May 17, 2024. It was released on November 8, 2024, by IFC Films.

== Premise ==
The Balsano family are together for their final family Christmas at their ancestral home. However, two of the younger members of the family escape for teenage rebellion.

== Cast ==
- Matilda Fleming as Emily
- Maria Dizzia as Kathleen
- Ben Shenkman as Lenny
- Francesca Scorsese as Michelle
- Elsie Fisher as Lynn
- Michael Cera as Officer Gibson
- Lev Cameron as Greg Falk
- Sawyer Spielberg as Splint
- Gregg Turkington as Sergeant Brooks
- Tony Savino as Uncle Ray
- Laura Robards as Joanne
- Leo Chan as Ty
- Jordan Barringer as Victoria
- Chris Lazzaro as Cousin Bruce
- Brittany Hughes as Susy Q
- Delancey Shapiro as Frankie
- Steve Aleeva as Uncle Ronald
- Shane Fleming as Geek
- Austin Lago as Ricky
- Courtney Warner as Stressed woman

== Production ==
The film is directed by Tyler Thomas Taormina. It is written by Taormina and Eric Berger. The film is produced by Omnes Films and was produced in association with Crypto Castle Productions and Puente Films. Producers include Michael Cera, Krista Minto, Taormina, David Croley Broyles and Duncan Sullivan.

The ensemble cast includes Michael Cera, Maria Dizzia, Francesca Scorsese, Elsie Fisher, Ben Shenkman, Sawyer Spielberg, Gregg Turkington, Laura Robards, Delancey Shapiro and Matilda Fleming.

Principal photography took place in February and March 2023 with locations including Smithtown, New York, and was completed on Long Island by 19 June 2023. The film is set in 2006 and includes contemporary technologies like cell phones; however, the production design emphasizes "pre-2006" vintage detail, evoking suburban Americana of the 1970s and 1980s.

== Release ==
The film premiered at the 2024 Cannes Film Festival as part of the Director's Fortnight section. In the run-up to its world premiere, Magnify, the rebranded international sales arm of Magnolia Pictures secured both global and U.S. sales rights for the film. The film also made it to the official selection of the 69th Valladolid International Film Festival, and the MAMI Mumbai Film Festival 2024.

== Reception ==
On the review aggregator website Rotten Tomatoes, 78% of 74 critics' reviews are positive, with an average rating of 6.6/10. The website's consensus reads: "Capturing both the cheer and frustration that accompany holiday gatherings, Christmas Eve in Miller's Point is a yuletide chronicle that rings true." Metacritic, which uses a weighted average, assigned the film a score of 72 out of 100, based on 20 critics, indicating "generally favorable" reviews.
