= Lost Chapters =

- Theatrical release poster
- Los capítulos perdidos
- Directed by: Lorena Alvarado
- Written by: Lorena Alvarado
- Produced by: José Ostos, Lorena Alvarado, coproduce with Tyler Taormina and Emiliana Ammirata
- Starring: Ena Alvarado, Ignacio Alvarado, Adela Rodríguez
- Cinematography: José Ostos, Lorena Alvarado
- Edited by: Lorena Alvarado
- Release date: 2024
- Running time: 67 min.
- Country: Venezuela
- Language: Spanish

Lost Chapters (Spanish: Los capítulos perdidos) is a 2024 Venezuelan drama film written, co-filmed and directed by Lorena Alvarado.

== Synopsis ==
After years abroad, Ena returns to Venezuela with a fragmented sense of self. At home, she finds her grandmother losing her grasp of reality. Meanwhile, her father spends his days looking for rare books in an attempt to safeguard his country's literary past. When Ena discovers a mysterious postcard inside a book, she embarks on a search across Caracas to uncover a forgotten writer, Rafael Bolívar Coronado. Her search gradually interweaves with her grandmother's memory loss and her father's quixotic dreams, as they all struggle to hold on to the past.

== Reception ==
Lost Chapters received critical acclaim following its premiere at the Marseille International Film Festival and subsequent screenings at Locarno, Gijón, and Monterrey. Critics praised Lorena Alvarado's delicate approach to themes of memory and cultural preservation, as well as the film's poetic cinematography and non-linear storytelling.

Mónica Delgado for Desistfilm highlighted Lost Chapters as a "deeply personal yet universally resonant" work, noting its ability to blend intimate family narratives with broader historical and cultural concerns. The review emphasized how Alvarado's direction captures the ephemeral nature of memory, particularly through the interplay between Ena's grandmother's fading recollections and her father's obsession with preserving literary relics of Venezuela's past.

According to Pablo Gamba, Lost Chapters successfully balances documentary and fiction elements, creating a "circular structure" that mirrors the act of remembering and forgetting. The review noted that the film's emotional impact lies in its ability to make audiences reflect on the fragility of history and the importance of storytelling as a means of resistance.

== Awards ==
- 2024 Best Latin American Feature Film. Festival Internacional de Cine de Monterrey
