= Please Don't Feed the Children =

2024 film by Destry Allyn Spielberg

- Release poster
- Directed by: Destry Allyn Spielberg
- Written by: Paul Bertino
- Produced by: Jason Dubin; Josh Kesselman; Michael Hagerty; Bill Kenwright; Daniel Ryniker
- Starring: Michelle Dockery; Zoe Colletti; Andrew Liner; Dean Scott Vazquez; Regan Aliyah; Emma Meisel; Joshuah Melnick; Vernon Davis; Giancarlo Esposito
- Cinematography: Shane Sigler
- Edited by: Todd Sandler
- Music by: Cornel Wilczek
- Production companies: Perry Street Films; BK Studios
- Distributed by: Tubi
- Release dates: October 11, 2024 (Sitges); June 27, 2025 (United States)
- Running time: 94 minutes
- Country: United States
- Language: English

Please Don't Feed the Children is a 2024 American psychological thriller film directed by Destry Allyn Spielberg and written by Paul Bertino. It stars Michelle Dockery, Zoe Colletti, Andrew Liner, Dean Scott Vazquez, Regan Aliyah, Emma Meisel, Joshuah Melnick, Vernon Davis, and Giancarlo Esposito.

The film had its world premiere at the 57th Sitges Film Festival on October 11, 2024. It was released on Tubi in the United States on June 27, 2025, to unfavorable reviews.

== Premise ==
A group of orphans head south in search of a new life after the country's adult population is wiped out from a viral outbreak. Soon they discover a dangerous secret from a deranged woman.

== Cast ==
- Michelle Dockery as Clara
- Zoe Colletti as Mary
- Andrew Liner as Ben
- Dean Scott Vazquez as Jeffy
- Regan Aliyah as Vicky
- Joshuah Melnick as Seth
- Emma Meisel as Crystal
- Giancarlo Esposito as Fitz
- Vernon Davis as Hank

== Production ==
In March 2023, it was reported that Destry Allyn Spielberg would make her feature directorial debut with Please Don't Feed the Children, from a script by Paul Bertino, with Michelle Dockery being cast in the lead role. In May 2023, Regan Aliyah, Zoe Colletti and Andrew Liner were cast. The following month, Joshuah Melnick, Emma Meisel and Dean Scott Vazquez joined the cast. Vernon Davis and Giancarlo Esposito were announced as part of the cast later that year.

Principal photography took place in Santa Fe, New Mexico in July 2023. The production was granted an interim agreement allowing the actors to continue working on the film during the 2023 SAG-AFTRA strike. The film faced production challenges, and although filming concluded in November 2023, several crew members and vendors had not received payment as of May 2024. While the production qualified for $750,000 in New Mexico tax credits, the credits could not be issued until all outstanding payments were resolved. Lead producer Jason Dubin acknowledged the delays and pursued additional financing on multiple occasions to address the remaining obligations. It was reported by producers later in May that all New Mexico crew and vendors had been paid.

== Release ==
The film had its world premiere at the 57th Sitges Film Festival on October 11, 2024. It was released in the United States on June 27, 2025, on Tubi.

=== Critical response ===
On the review aggregator website Rotten Tomatoes, 36% of 11 critics' reviews are positive, with an average rating of 4.6/10. Metacritic, which uses a weighted average, assigned the film a score of 39 out of 100, based on 4 critics, indicating "generally unfavorable" reviews.

Lena Wilson of IGN gave a negative review, writing "what starts as a novel – if dubious – spin on the end of the world quickly becomes a bland, overcooked nothing burger, no thanks to Paul Bertino's one-dimensional screenplay and Spielberg's unsteady direction". On Fangoria, Todd Gilchrist praised Spielberg's direction, writing that she "demonstrates with this that she has a dexterous understanding of technique, genre convention and emotional nuance. In name and concept, Please Don't Feed the Children may arrive like an admonition, but the end result is a reminder that horror needs more directors who know their way around a camera — and they should be encouraged regardless of their family pedigree".
