= Kenny Morrison =

American actor

- Occupation: Actor
- Years active: 1987–2009

Kenny Morrison is an American actor, who began his career as a child actor.

Morrison took over the role of Atreyu in The NeverEnding Story II: The Next Chapter. His first role was as Tom McKaskel in the TV movie The Quick and the Dead, based on the novel by Louis L'Amour. Morrison has also appeared in number of TV series, including Our House, Who's the Boss? and Growing Pains. He had a small role in the episode "Learning Curve" of Star Trek: Voyager, in which he played the introverted young Bajoran Gerron, a former Maquis insurgent. He has also appeared in some films, including Little Athens.
