= Honeydew (film) =

2020 American horror film

- Film poster
- Directed by: Devereux Milburn
- Screenplay by: Devereux Milburn
- Produced by: Dan Kennedy; Alan Pierson
- Starring: Sawyer Spielberg; Malin Barr; Barbara Kingsley
- Cinematography: Dan Kennedy
- Edited by: Devereux Milburn
- Music by: John Mehrmann
- Production company: Little Sky Film
- Distributed by: Dark Star Pictures
- Release dates: October 2020 (Nightstream); March 12, 2021 (North America)
- Running time: 120 minutes
- Country: United States
- Language: English
- Box office: $3.2 million

Honeydew is a 2020 American horror film written and directed by Devereux Milburn, and was later released in the US on March 12, 2021. The film stars Sawyer Spielberg, Malin Barr and Barbara Kingsley. It received generally mixed reviews from critics.

== Plot ==
Aspiring actor Sam and his botanist girlfriend Rylie have travelled to rural New England to investigate an outbreak of an ergot-type fungus called "sordico" that has been devastating local farms. They camp on a remote farm, but elderly farmer and landowner Eulis asks the couple to leave. Sam and Rylie return to their car to discover its battery died, leaving them stranded. They look for help at a nearby farmhouse and meet Karen, an eccentric old woman, and her son Gunni, who is mute, partially catatonic, constantly watching vintage cartoons, and wears bandages around his head. Karen explains Gunni’s behavior by saying a bull kicked him in the head.

Karen calls a mechanic named Pete to come and jumpstart the couple’s car. While waiting, she feeds Sam and Rylie strange food that conflicts with their strict vegan diet, while also engaging in odd conversation, which includes Rylie asking about weird Polaroids of Karen’s family. When Pete fails to show up, Karen sets up Sam and Rylie with sleeping arrangements in the cellar. After three months of maintaining his strict diet, Sam leaves Rylie alone to gorge on more of Karen’s food in the kitchen, and Gunni experiences a seizure while seemingly trying to say something to Sam. Sam then passes out and has a dream where everyone turns into Popeye characters discussing a medical condition with his stomach. Meanwhile, Rylie investigates unsettling sounds in the cellar. Sam returns to the basement to find her missing, and he also discovers Karen is gone from her bedroom. Sam calls 911 before investigating Karen’s barn. However, once he is inside, Karen injects Sam with a drug that knocks him unconscious.

Sam and Rylie recover to find themselves restrained on a raised platform and wearing breathing masks connected to gas tanks, one of Sam’s buttocks bleeding and bandaged. Karen, Eulis, and Gunni eat at a picnic table beneath the couple. Driven mad from sordico and justifying their lifestyle through a misinterpretation of God’s will, Karen explains that she and Eulis became cannibals to compensate for crops turning bad. Karen additionally reveals that she and Eulis “adopt” unwilling participants to feed on. Gunni is revealed to have been a random hunter who was lobotomized before Karen and Eulis began cutting off body parts like his cheeks to eat. Karen and Eulis open a crate containing Delilah, a lobotomized woman without limbs whom they call their daughter. Karen and Eulis feed Delilah pieces of Sam’s cooked rump flesh.

Eulis prepares to lobotomize Sam when a cop unexpectedly interrupts. While Karen and Eulis deal with the police officer, Sam talks Gunni into freeing him and Rylie. After the cop leaves, Karen and Eulis catch Sam, Rylie, and Gunni trying to escape. Gunni dies after triggering an animal trap. Karen recaptures Sam and Rylie. Some time later, Rylie is seen in Gunni’s seat at Karen’s table. Rylie is lobotomized, wearing head bandages from having her cheeks eaten, and is visibly pregnant too. In the basement, Sam is seen having been turned into a semi-sentient torso like Delilah. After feeding them, Karen forces Sam and Delilah to have sex.

== Cast ==
- Sawyer Spielberg as Sam
- Malin Barr as Rylie
- Barbara Kingsley as Karen
- Jamie Bradley as Gunni
- Stephen D'Ambrose as Eulis
- Lena Dunham as Delilah
- Rachel Alexandria Arnold as Funeral Singer

== Release ==
Honeydew was scheduled for its world premiere at the 2020 Tribeca Film Festival before the fest was shuttered because of the coronavirus pandemic. Finally, the film had its worldwide premiere at the virtual Nightstream film festival in October 2020. Dark Star Pictures released the film in North America in available theaters on March 12, 2021.

== Reception ==
Review aggregator website Rotten Tomatoes reports that 67% of 46 critics gave Honeydew a positive review, summarizing: "Atmospheric horror built on layers of creeping dread, Honeydew finds fresh frights in its familiar setup -- and portends great things for writer-director Devereux Milburn." According to Metacritic, which calculated a weighted average score of 40 out of 100 based on 9 critics, the film received "mixed or average" reviews.

Screen Rant gave the film a 1.5 out of 5 stars rating, stating that the film "feels derivative from start to finish, its arthouse elements lending an aura of inauthenticity to an already-lackluster backwoods nightmare."
