= Siobhan Vivian =

American novelist (born 1979)

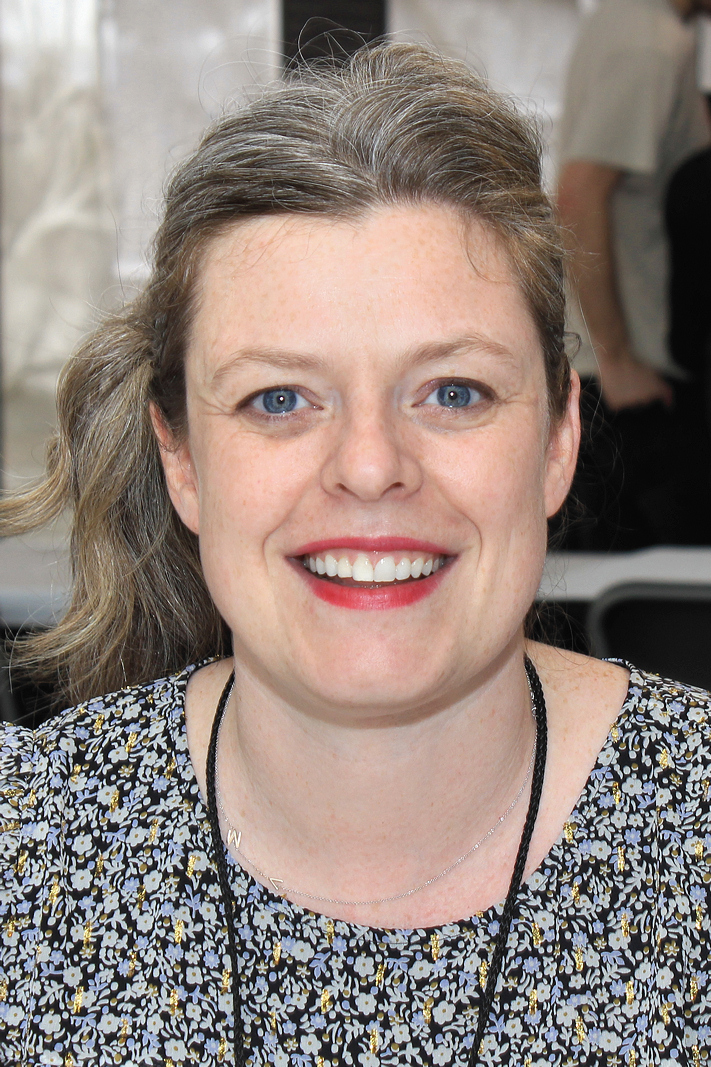
- Vivian at the 2016 Texas Book Festival
- Born: Siobhan Vivian; January 12, 1979 (age 47); New York City, U.S.
- Education: Rutherford High School; University of the Arts; The New School (MFA)
- Occupation: Novelist
- Children: 2
- Writing career
- Period: 2008–present
- Genre: Realistic fiction
- Subject: Young adult literature
- Website: www.siobhanvivian.com

Siobhan Vivian (born January 12, 1979) is a bestselling American novelist, editor, and screenwriter.

== Early life and education ==
Siobhan Vivian was born in New York City on January 12, 1979. At a young age, Vivian moved to Rutherford, New Jersey where she went to school and often got in trouble for sneaking out and not doing her homework. A 1997 graduate of Rutherford High School, Vivian has used her childhood in Rutherford as a "deep well" of ideas for her work.

Vivian moved to Philadelphia after high school where she attended the University of the Arts and graduated in 2001 with a degree in Writing for Film and Television. Vivian then moved back to New York City where she earned an MFA in Creative Writing: Children's Literature from The New School. It was while in graduate school that Vivian met fellow authors Morgan Matson and Jenny Han, the latter of which she would go on to cowrite the Burn for Burn Trilogy with.

== Career ==
After college, Vivian worked as an editor at Alloy Entertainment where she worked on a number of New York Times Bestselling Series and also was the screenwriter for Playhouse Disney's Little Einsteins.

In 2008, Vivian's first book, A Little Friendly Advice, was released and was shortly followed by a picture book she cowrote with J. Otto Seibold titled Vunce Upon A Time. Vivian's next book, Same Difference, which was published in 2009, garnered Kirkus Reviews Best Book of the Year as well as 2012 ALA Best Fiction for Young Adults. Both of these awards were also awarded to her next book, Not That Kind of Girl, along with a Caroline W. Field Award Nomination. Her most recent solo book, The List, inspired by true events at a high school in New Jersey, was published in 2012 and earned the ALA 2013 Best Fiction for Young Adults, was a Junior Library Guild Selection, and was a best seller in France. The novel was also optioned by MTV with Stephen Chbosky as executive producer. All of Vivian's individually written books were published by Push, an imprint of Scholastic.

In 2012, Vivian also published Burn for Burn the first book in the Burn for Burn Trilogy with fellow young adult author, Jenny Han. The following two books were published each following year. Vivian's most recent novel, The Last Boy and Girl in the World, was released in April 2016.

In the June 19, 2016 edition of the New York Times Book Review, Vivian placed at number 2 in the Young Adult E-book category for The List.

In November 2019, Vivian faced criticism for her tweets regarding Brooke Nelson, a college student who was mentioned in her local newspaper as saying she thought that author Sarah Dessen's YA novels were not suitable for the Common Read program run by Northern State University, Aberdeen. When the story was reported in Jezebel, The Guardian, the Washington Post, and Slate, Vivian reportedly regretted her actions.

== Personal life ==
She currently resides in the Highland Park neighborhood of Pittsburgh with her husband, designer Nick Caruso, and their daughters, Vivian (born 2013) and Marie (born 2015). Additionally, Vivian is a professor of creative writing at the University of Pittsburgh.

== Bibliography ==
- 2008 – A Little Friendly Advice
- 2008 – Vunce Upon A Time (with J. Otto Seibold)
- 2009 – Same Difference
- 2010 – Not that Kind of Girl
- 2012 – The List
- 2012 – Burn for Burn (Burn for Burn, #1) (with Jenny Han)
- 2013 – Fire with Fire (Burn for Burn, #2) (with Jenny Han)
- 2014 – Ashes to Ashes (Burn for Burn, #3) (with Jenny Han)
- 2016 – The Last Boy and Girl in the World
- 2018 - Stay Sweet
- 2020 - We are the Wildcats
