= Sawyer Spielberg =

American actor (born 1992)

- Spielberg in 2026
- Born: Sawyer Avery Spielberg; March 10, 1992 (age 34)
- Other name: Sawyer Avery
- Occupation: Actor
- Years active: 2012–present
- Spouse: Raye Levine Spielberg (m. 2018)
- Children: 2
- Parents: Steven Spielberg (father); Kate Capshaw (mother)
- Relatives: Sasha Spielberg (sister); Destry Spielberg (sister); Jessica Capshaw (half-sister); Arnold Spielberg (grandfather)

Sawyer Avery Spielberg (born March 10, 1992) is an American actor. He is the son of director Steven Spielberg and actress Kate Capshaw.

== Early life ==
He received a diagnosis of dyslexia and he attended a private high school for students with language-based difficulties. He went by his middle name, Sawyer Avery, at the beginning of his career in 2012. When he was a teenager he enrolled in an acting workshop at Edgemar Center for the Arts near Venice Beach in Santa Monica, California. At 18 years old, he left home to move to New York and was accepted into the Atlantic Repertory Theatre's conservatory.

== Career ==
As a youngster, he would spend time on his father's film sets and told People magazine the first set he remembered was Saving Private Ryan. As a teenager, he worked as a production assistant on some of his father's films, including Indiana Jones and the Kingdom of the Crystal Skull. He told USA Today that his experiences initially drew him away from film and more towards stage acting. This was, he said, because "what the audience can give you has always energized me in a big way", whereas he had experience of seeing actors on film sets for whom there seemed to be "a lot of waiting around and there wasn't enough action.”

In 2012, he made his off-Broadway debut in Belgrade Trilogy at the 4th Street Theatre, using his stage name Sawyer Avery. He appeared in a production of The Diary of Anne Frank at the Guild Hall of East Hampton Bay Street Theatre in Sag Harbor, New York and in 2014 directed, and had the lead role, in a staged reading of Neil Simon's Biloxi Blues at the Guild Hall's John Drew Theater.

In 2016, he directed a short film entitled Breathe. He made his feature film acting debut in 2017 film The Post, playing a protestor who delivers a monologue. In April and May 2019, he appeared in a production of Art directed by Yasmine Reza at the Guild Hall, New York. In 2020 he had a lead role in the horror film Honeydew, directed by Devereux Milburn and also featuring Lena Dunham.

In January 2023, in the New York State, he began principal photography on upcoming independent film Martyr of Gowanus in which he has the lead role and appears alongside Holt McCallany. That year, he could be seen in the Christmas-movie Merry Good Enough. In 2023, he also filmed the independent short thriller film Pink Flags playing opposite his real-life wife Raye Levine Spielberg, a figure skater who believes she is being stalked.

In January 2024, he appeared in the Apple TV+ historical drama series Masters of the Air. He will feature in the upcoming film Christmas Eve in Miller's Point alongside Michael Cera, amongst others. and Once Upon a time in Hell's Kicthen.

== Personal life ==
In 2018, he married the actress Raye Levine Spielberg, whom he met whilst they were both performing. They have a daughter and a son.

== Partial filmography ==
Key
†	Denotes works that have not yet been released

Year	Title	Role	Notes
2017	The Post	Plaza Protestor	
2020	Honeydew	Sam	Lead role
2023	Merry Good Enough	Sam	
2024	Masters of the Air	Lt. Roy Claytor	Recurring role
2024	Christmas Eve in Miller's Point†	Splint	
2025	Materialists	Mason	
TBA	Martyr of Gowanus†	TBA	Post-production
TBA	Orion†	Sam	Short film, post-production
TBA	Pink Flags†	Eamon	In production
TBA	Wreckless†	Bo	In production
