= Kate Capshaw =

American actress

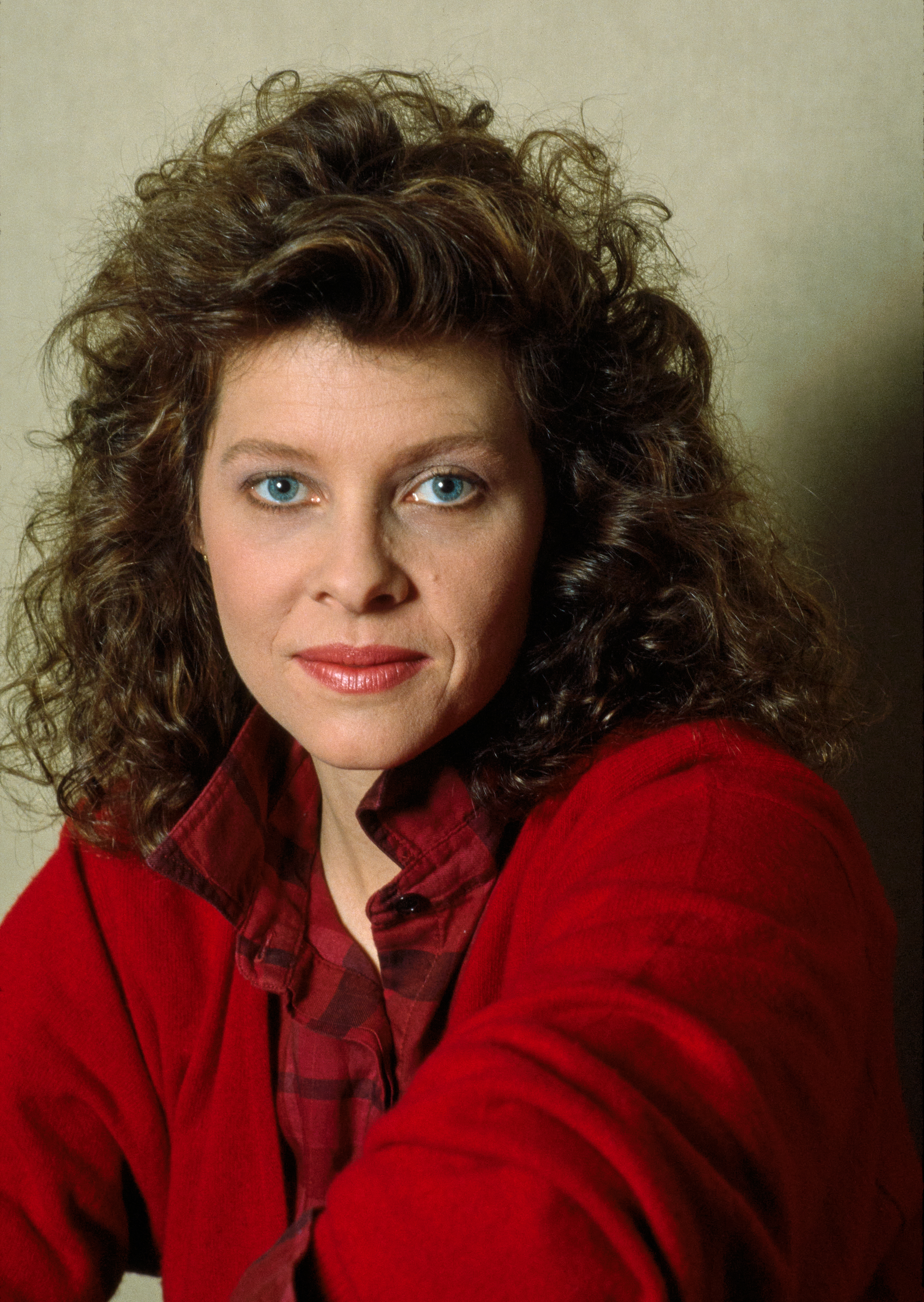
- Capshaw in 1984
- Born: Kathleen Sue Nail; November 3, 1953 (age 73); Fort Worth, Texas, U.S.
- Education: University of Missouri
- Occupations: Actress; producer; painter
- Years active: 1981–2001
- Spouses: Robert Capshaw (m. 1976; div. 1980); Steven Spielberg (m. 1991)
- Children: 6, including Jessica, Sasha, Sawyer, and Destry
- Relatives: Arnold Spielberg (father-in-law); Christopher Gavigan (son-in-law)

Kathleen Sue Spielberg (née Nail; born November 3, 1953), known professionally as Kate Capshaw, is an American retired actress, producer, visual artist, and painter. She is best known for her portrayal of Willie Scott in Indiana Jones and the Temple of Doom (1984), directed by her eventual husband, Steven Spielberg. She subsequently starred in Dreamscape (1984), Power (1986), SpaceCamp (1986), Black Rain (1989), Love Affair (1994), Just Cause (1995), The Locusts (1997), and The Love Letter (1999). Her portraiture work, including The Picture Maker, has been shown in the National Portrait Gallery and the Pérez Art Museum Miami.

== Early life ==
Capshaw was born Kathleen Sue Nail, the daughter of airline employee Edwin L. Nail (1933–1998) who was of Irish descent, and Beverly (née Simon; 1933–2013).

She married marketing manager Robert Capshaw in January 1976 and they had one child, Jessica Capshaw, before divorcing in 1980. She kept the surname Capshaw, which she used for her professional name upon becoming an actress.

== Career ==
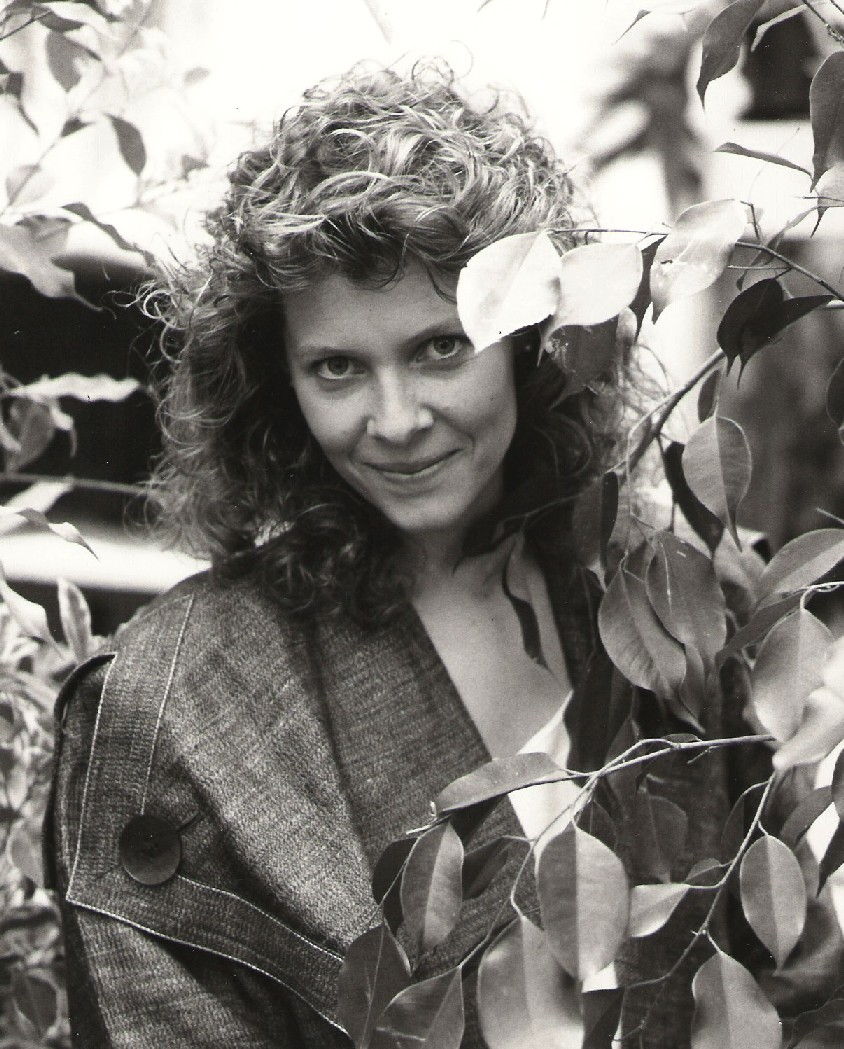
Capshaw in June 1984

Capshaw moved to New York City to pursue her dream of acting, landing her first role on the soap opera The Edge of Night. After auditioning for a small role in A Little Sex, she was offered the role of the leading lady, which is when she asked for a dismissal from The Edge of Night. She starred in Dreamscape in 1984, and afterwards was directed by her then-boyfriend Armyan Bernstein in Windy City.

Capshaw met film director and future husband Steven Spielberg upon winning the female lead as Willie Scott in Indiana Jones and the Temple of Doom (1984), a prequel to Spielberg's Raiders of the Lost Ark (1981). Capshaw starred opposite Harrison Ford, who played Indiana Jones. In addition, she appeared as Andie Bergstrom, an appealing and stern yet frustrated camp instructor in the 1986 film SpaceCamp, opposite Richard Gere and Gene Hackman in Power (1986), and starred as Susanna McKaskel in The Quick and The Dead (1987) with Sam Elliott. Capshaw also starred in the spy film/romance Her Secret Life.

Capshaw had roles in several films throughout the late 1980s into the 1990s. She starred alongside Michael Douglas and Andy García in Black Rain (1989), Sean Connery and Laurence Fishburne in Just Cause (1995), and Warren Beatty and Annette Bening in Love Affair (1994). She was also featured in the 1997 film The Alarmist with David Arquette and Stanley Tucci. In 1999, she starred in and produced The Love Letter.

In 2001, Capshaw starred in the television film A Girl Thing with Stockard Channing, Rebecca De Mornay and Elle Macpherson. It is her last acting role to date.

== Painting practice ==
In 2009, Capshaw began studying visual arts, including drawing, painting, and portraiture. She focused on painting portraits of homeless youth, and in 2019, three of her works were selected as finalists in the Smithsonian National Portrait Gallery's (NPG) Outwin Boochever Portrait Competition. These portraits were included in the exhibition The Outwin 2019: American Portraiture Today.

In 2024, Capshaw held a solo exhibition titled Kate Capshaw: Exclusive Tonsorial Services at the Pérez Art Museum Miami. The work was inspired by conversations with Sergei (Sirj) Grant, a local barber and community leader involved in financial education and youth advocacy in Miami-Dade County.

In 2022, the NPG commissioned Capshaw to a paint a portrait of Spielberg; accompanying the portrait is film of Spielberg's early work, curated by Capshaw, that is projected beside the portrait. The Picture Maker entered the NPG's permanent collection after it was presented at the Portrait of a Nation gala in November 2025, where Spielberg was a 2025 Portrait of a Nation honoree.

In 2026, a portrait which Capshaw painted of former Obama Administration White House chef Tafari Campbell was included in the Obama Presidential Center in Chicago, Illinois.

== Personal life ==
During the production of the film Indiana Jones and the Temple of Doom (1984), Capshaw became close to director Steven Spielberg, whom she later married. Originally an Episcopalian, she converted to Judaism before marrying Spielberg on October 12, 1991. They were married in both a civil ceremony and an Orthodox ceremony.

There are seven children in the Spielberg–Capshaw family.

- Jessica Capshaw – daughter from Capshaw's previous marriage to Robert Capshaw
- Max Samuel Spielberg – son from Spielberg's previous marriage to actress Amy Irving
- Theo Spielberg – son adopted by Capshaw before her marriage to Spielberg, who later also adopted him
- Sasha Spielberg
- Sawyer Spielberg
- Mikaela George Spielberg – adopted with Steven Spielberg
- Destry Spielberg

== Filmography ==
=== Film ===
Year	Title	Role	Note
1982	A Little Sex	Katherine Harrison	
1984	Indiana Jones and the Temple of Doom	Willie Scott	
1984	Best Defense	Laura Cooper	
1984	Dreamscape	Jane DeVries	
1984	Windy City	Emily Reubens	
1986	Power	Sydney Betterman	
1986	SpaceCamp	Andie Bergstrom	
1987	The Quick and the Dead	Susanna McKaskel	
1988	Private Affairs	Brunetta	
1989	Black Rain	Joyce	
1990	Love at Large	Mrs. Ellen McGraw	
1991	My Heroes Have Always Been Cowboys	Jolie Meadows	
1994	Love Affair	Lynn Weaver	
1995	Just Cause	Laurie Prentiss Armstrong	
1995	How to Make an American Quilt	Sally Dodd	
1997	The Locusts	Delilah Ashford Potts	
1997	The Alarmist	Gale Ancona	
1999	The Love Letter	Helen MacFarquhar	Also producer
2015	Everything Is Copy	Herself	Documentary film
2024	Music by John Williams	Herself	Documentary film
2026	Marty, Life Is Short	Herself	Documentary film

=== Television ===
Year	Title	Role	Notes
1981	The Edge of Night	Jinx Avery Mallory #1	TV series
1982	Missing Children: A Mother's Story	Elaine Rogers	TV film
1987	The Quick and the Dead	Susanna McKaskel	TV film
1987	Her Secret Life	Annie	TV film
1988	Internal Affairs	Joanna Gates	TV film
1993	Black Tie Affair	Margo Cody	TV series; 13 episodes
1994	Next Door	Karen Coler	TV film
1996	Duke of Groove	Rebecka	Short film
2001	A Girl Thing	Casey Montgomery	TV film
2001	Due East	Becky Purdue	TV film
