= The Love Letter (1999 film) =

1999 film by Peter Chan

- Theatrical release poster
- Directed by: Peter Chan
- Screenplay by: Maria Maggenti
- Based on: The Love Letter by Cathleen Schine
- Produced by: Kate Capshaw; Sarah Pillsbury; Midge Sanford
- Starring: Kate Capshaw; Blythe Danner; Ellen DeGeneres; Geraldine McEwan; Julianne Nicholson; Tom Everett Scott; Tom Selleck; Gloria Stuart
- Cinematography: Tami Reiker
- Edited by: Jacqueline Cambas
- Music by: Luis Enríquez Bacalov
- Distributed by: DreamWorks Pictures
- Release date: May 21, 1999
- Running time: 88 minutes
- Country: United States
- Language: English
- Budget: $20 million
- Box office: $8 million

The Love Letter is a 1999 American romantic comedy film directed by Peter Chan and starring Kate Capshaw, Ellen DeGeneres, Tom Everett Scott, and Tom Selleck. It is based on the novel by Cathleen Schine. The original music score was composed by Luis Enriquez Bacalov. The film takes place in the fictional Massachusetts town of Loblolly-by-the-Sea and was filmed in Rockport, Massachusetts.

This was Kate Capshaw's final film before her retirement from acting in 2001. The Love Letter was released by DreamWorks Pictures on May 21, 1999, the same weekend as the Star Wars reboot, The Phantom Menace. The film received negative reviews from critics and was a box office bomb, grossing $8 million against a $20 million budget.

== Plot ==
Recently divorced Helen MacFarquhar, a middle-aged bookseller, after sending her daughter off to summer camp, is ready to move on in her life. One morning, going through the mail, she discovers an anonymous blue love letter, without an envelope or a name. Having discovered this letter in her mail, in her bookstore, she naturally thinks it is for her. The only question is, from whom?

At first, she thinks it is from George Matthias, the local fireman, but decides it couldn't be him, after giving him subtle hints ("Have you ever been 'on fire'?"). Not having any idea who may be the writer of the love letter, she just puts it away in her purse, trying to forget about it.

Then, Johnny, a college student working in Helen's bookstore for the summer, is invited to her house for dinner. At dinner she puts two wine glasses and a bottle next to her purse, with the letter in it. Helen accidentally knocks the letter out of the purse. While in the kitchen cooking, she tells Johnny to have some wine. Finding the letter, he mistakenly thinks it is for him from Helen.

Later that night, Johnny begins to "peel an orange", a line from the letter. Believing it's his hint, Helen rushes into the house and says goodnight, and he leaves. In the next few weeks, Johnny and Helen meet and begin an affair, each thinking the other wrote the letter.

Helen goes to the bookstore, bringing the letter with her, in her purse on the desk. Then, her manager, Janet Hall, arrives, but she decides not to tell her about the letter just yet. While she is upstairs working, George comes in with new smoke detectors for the store. Janet accepts them, but the desk collapses, along with Helen's purse, which contains the letter. In all the chaos, the letter is mixed in with the instruction manuals for the smoke detectors. George, before leaving, says "Make sure you read the manuals first." Janet opens the manual, and the letter falls out. She reads it and thinks it is from George.

Later that day, Janet rushes over to tell Helen about the letter. But she, not knowing how to say it, just takes it and says "It's mine". Janet, angry at Helen for not having faith in her happiness, quits.

As the story progresses, many others accidentally find the letter and mistakenly think it's meant for them. During the affair, Johnny uses his friend Jennifer's affections for him to make Helen jealous. However, she's disheartened to realize he was using her. An officer also finds the letter, thinking it was from a lady he admires; he takes it, presenting it to her on a date, so she thinks he wrote the letter to her.

As the affair goes on, Johnny's feelings deepen, and he becomes jealous of Helen's closeness with George. He continues to try to push for a real relationship; however, she is torn due to her feelings for George. When it comes to a boiling point, the pair realize that neither side wrote the love letter. Helen also realizes that George still loves her when she finds a message he left in a postcard.

They break up on amiable terms but, unfortunately, George hears the breakup and is left heartbroken and confused. Though his divorce is final, he feels he's lost Helen to Johnny. She isn't ready to let go of her feelings for George and asks if it really is over. He quietly replies "We have bad timing" and announces he's taking his daughters to New York.

Though Helen wants him to stay, George seems determined to leave. The next day, she tells him she only recently saw the inside message he left her and declares she also wants to keep in contact. Hinting he still wants to continue their relationship, George smiles and says he'll send a "postcard".

Amidst all the confusion, it is revealed that the letter was actually written by Helen's mother's lover to another woman, early in her life. Considering the conservative period and social stigma, the relationship could not be until now.

== Main cast ==
- Kate Capshaw as Helen MacFarquhar
- Blythe Danner as Lillian MacFarquhar
- Ellen DeGeneres as Janet Hall
- Julianne Nicholson as Jennifer McNeely
- Tom Everett Scott as Johnny Howell
- Tom Selleck as George Matthias
- Gloria Stuart as Eleanor
- Geraldine McEwan as Miss Scattergoods

== Reception ==
The Love Letter received negative reviews from critics. On the review aggregator website Rotten Tomatoes, 33% of 51 critics' reviews are positive, with an average rating of 4.9/10. The website's consensus reads: "Poor character development and scripting hamper any romantic chemistry."

Being the only new release opposite Star Wars Episode I: The Phantom Menace, with a theatrical premiere on May 21, 1999, DreamWorks believed The Love Letter had a counterprogramming appeal to stand its own. It debuted at only fifth place, with $2.6 million from 769 screens. The following week, marking the Memorial Day holiday, the film fell to sixth place while expanding to only 19 more theaters as another romantic comedy, Notting Hill had a wide release, and by its third weekend The Love Letter was out of the top ten entirely.

As part of a press kit campaign, the production company sent copies of the eponymous love letter to film critics with many of them mistaking it for an actual love letter. Jonathan Rosenbaum of the Chicago Reader mentioned feeling particularly betrayed when seeing the film and realizing that the mysterious love letter that he had received was actually a copy of the one in the film. He tells this story on the May 6, 2005 episode of This American Life, "Not What I Meant".
