= List of accolades received by The Fabelmans =

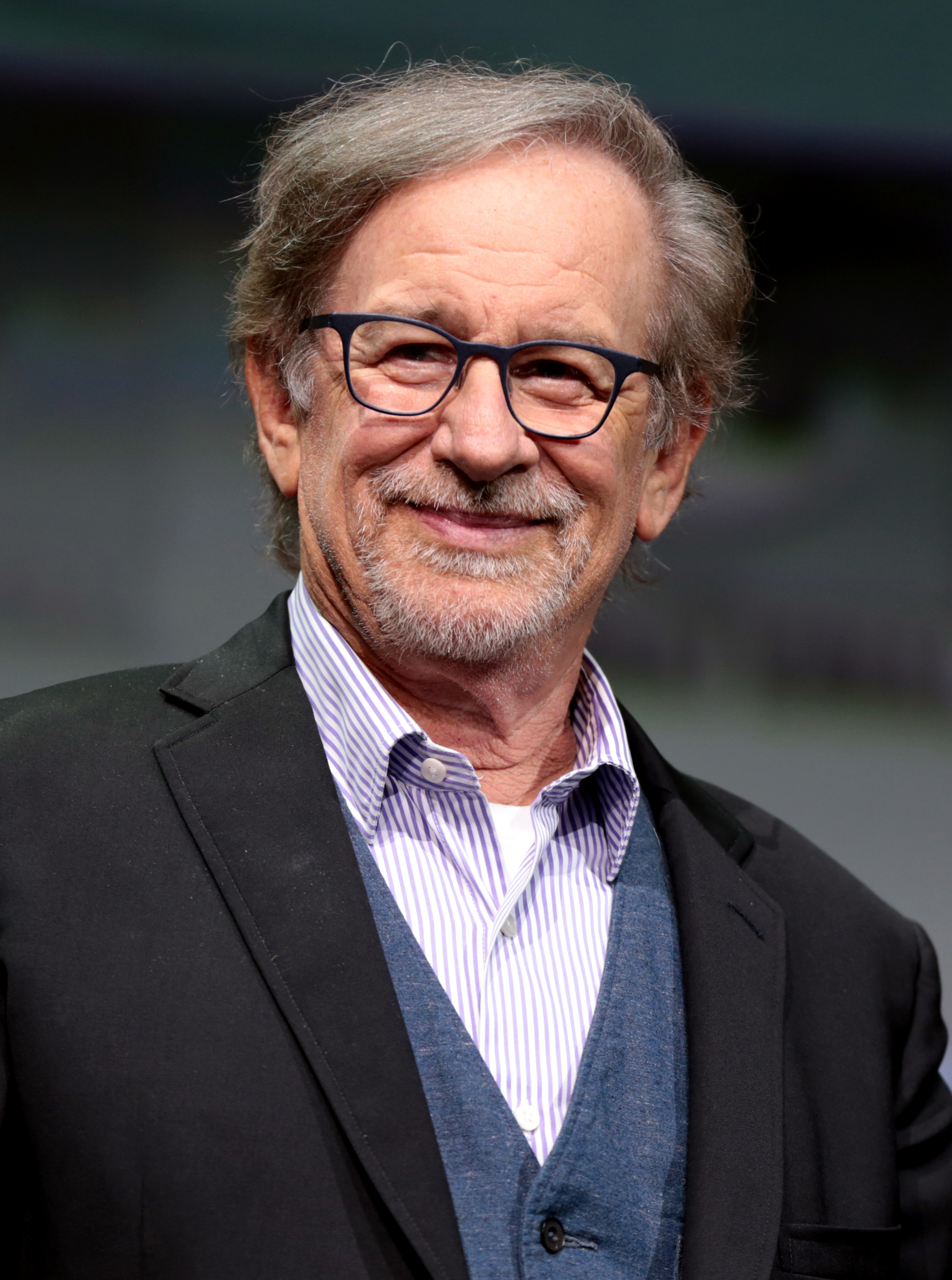
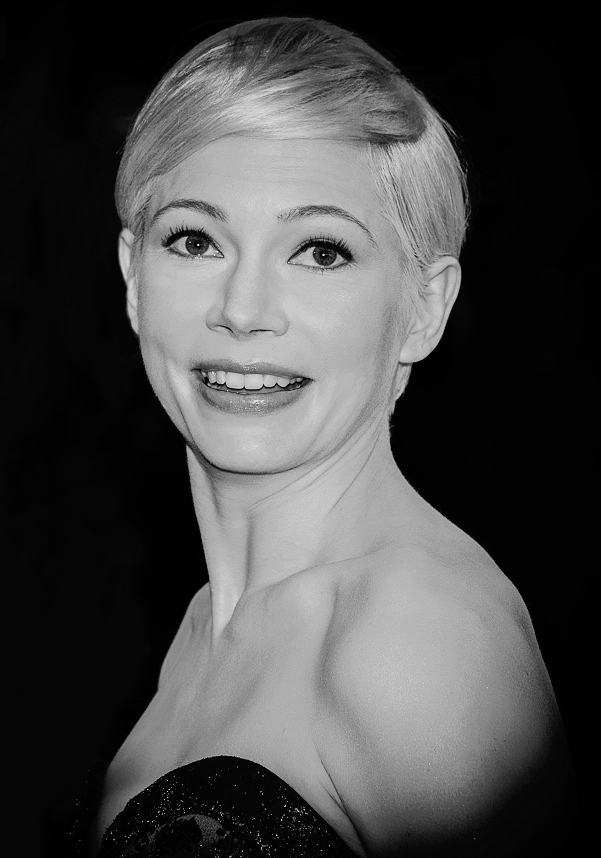
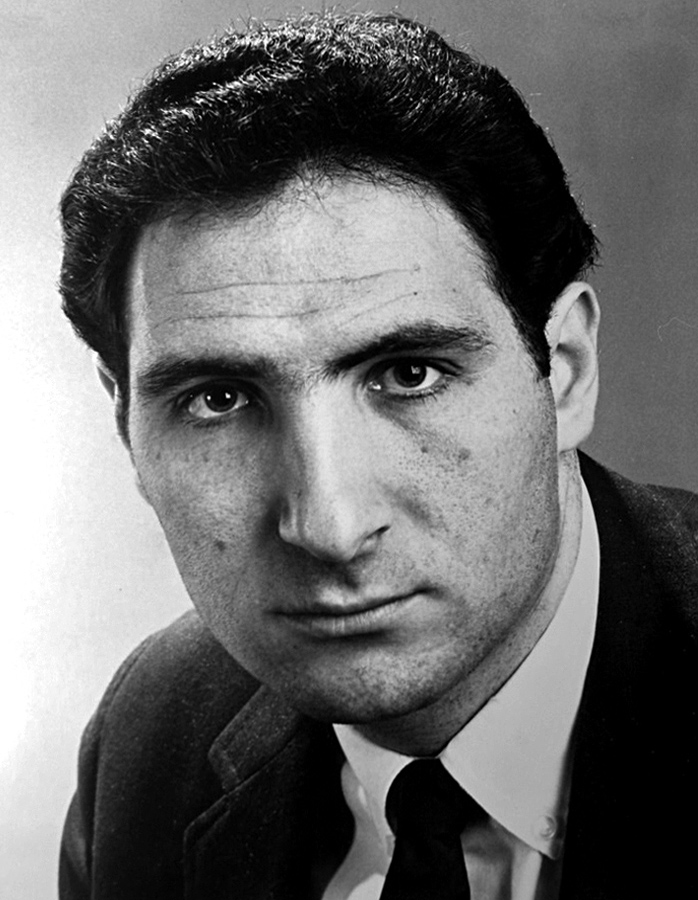
- Steven Spielberg received widespread critical acclaim for his direction, as did Michelle Williams and Judd Hirsch for their performances as Mitzi Fabelman and Uncle Boris.
Accolades
Award	Wins	Nominations
AACTA International Awards	0	2
AARP Movies for Grownups Awards	1	6
Academy Awards	0	7
Alliance of Women Film Journalists	0	4
American Film Institute Awards	1	1
Art Directors Guild	0	1
Artios Awards	1	1
British Academy Film Awards	0	1
California On Location Awards	0	1
Chicago Film Critics Association	0	2
Cinema for Peace Awards	0	1
Critics' Choice Movie Awards	1	11
Dallas–Fort Worth Film Critics Association	0	5
David di Donatello Awards	1	1
Directors Guild of America	0	1
Dorian Awards	0	2
Florida Film Critics Circle	0	8
Georgia Film Critics Association	0	8
Golden Globe Awards	2	5
Grammy Awards	0	1
Heartland Film Festival	1	1
Hollywood Critics Association	2	4
Hollywood Critics Association Creative Arts Awards	0	1
Hollywood Post Alliance Awards	0	1
International Cinephile Society	0	4
London Film Critics Circle	0	2
Miami International Film Festival	1	1
National Board of Review	3	3
New York Film Critics Online	1	1
Palm Springs International Film Festival	1	1
Paris Film Critics Association Awards	0	8
Producers Guild of America Awards	0	1
San Diego Film Critics Society	0	8
San Francisco Bay Area Film Critics Circle	0	5
San Luis Obispo International Film Festival	2	2
Satellite Awards	0	9
St. Louis Film Critics Association	1	8
Screen Actors Guild Awards	0	2
Set Decorators Society of America	0	1
Toronto International Film Festival	1	1
Visual Effects Society	0	1
Washington D.C. Area Film Critics Association	1	10
World Soundtrack Awards	0	1
Writers Guild of America	0	1

Totals (Note: Certain award groups do not simply award one winner. They acknowledge several different recipients, have runners-up, and have third place. Since this is a specific recognition and is different from losing an award, runner-up mentions are considered wins in this award tally. For simplification and to avoid errors, each award in this list has been presumed to have had a prior nomination.)
- Wins: 27
- Nominations: 146

The Fabelmans is a 2022 American coming-of-age drama film directed by Steven Spielberg, who co-wrote and co-produced it with Tony Kushner. The film is a semi-autobiographical story loosely based on Spielberg's adolescence and first years as a filmmaker. It is told through an original story of the fictional Sammy Fabelman, a young aspiring filmmaker who explores how the power of films can help him see the truth about his dysfunctional family and those around him. It stars Gabriel LaBelle as Sammy, alongside Michelle Williams, Paul Dano, Seth Rogen, and Judd Hirsch in supporting roles. The film is dedicated to the memories of Spielberg's real-life parents, Leah Adler and Arnold Spielberg, who died in 2017 and 2020 respectively.

Spielberg had conceived the project as early as 1999, with his sister Anne writing a screenplay titled I'll Be Home. The project was withheld for 20 years, since Spielberg had reservations about exploring his family's story over concerns that his parents would be hurt. Spielberg revisited the project in 2019 with screenwriter and frequent collaborator Kushner while they were making West Side Story, and the screenplay was completed in late 2020. Development of the film officially began soon after, with casting taking place between March and May 2021. Principal photography began that July in Los Angeles and wrapped in September.

The Fabelmans premiered at the Toronto International Film Festival on September 10, 2022, where it won the People's Choice Award. Distributed by Universal Pictures, the film opened as a limited theatrical release in the United States on November 11, 2022, and then expanded to a wide release on November 23. It underperformed at the box office, grossing only $45.6 million against a $40 million budget. The film received widespread critical acclaim, however, with praise directed towards the performances of the cast (particularly LaBelle, Williams, Dano and Hirsch), Spielberg's direction, the screenplay, cinematography, and John Williams' score. It was named one of the top ten films of 2022 by the National Board of Review and the American Film Institute.

The film received seven nominations at the 95th Academy Awards, including Best Picture, five nominations at the 80th Golden Globe Awards, winning Best Motion Picture – Drama and Best Director for Spielberg, and received 11 nominations at the 28th Critics' Choice Awards, including Best Picture, winning Best Young Performer for LaBelle, and two nominations at the 29th Screen Actors Guild Awards including Best Ensemble Cast of a Motion Picture and Best Supporting Actor (for Dano). It also received 2 awards from the National Board of Review, including Best Director for Spielberg and Breakthrough Performance for LaBelle (shared with Danielle Deadwyler for Till), making this the second Spielberg film to win both of these awards together since 1987's Empire of the Sun. With his 53rd nomination for Best Original Score with this film, John Williams broke his own record as the most Oscar-nominated person alive at the age of 90. With his Oscar nomination for Best Supporting Actor, Judd Hirsch became the first actor to receive two nominations over four decades apart, with this being his second nomination and first since the 53rd Academy Awards in 1981, where he was nominated for Ordinary People (1980).

== Accolades ==
Accolades received by The Fabelmans
Award	Date of ceremony	Category	Recipient(s)	Result	Ref.
AACTA International Awards	February 24, 2023	Best Direction	Steven Spielberg	Nominated	
AACTA International Awards	February 24, 2023	Best Actress	Michelle Williams	Nominated	
AARP Movies for Grownups Awards	January 28, 2023	Best Movie for Grownups	The Fabelmans	Nominated	
AARP Movies for Grownups Awards	January 28, 2023	Best Director	Steven Spielberg	Nominated	
AARP Movies for Grownups Awards	January 28, 2023	Best Supporting Actor	Judd Hirsch	Won	
AARP Movies for Grownups Awards	January 28, 2023	Best Screenwriter	Steven Spielberg and Tony Kushner	Nominated	
AARP Movies for Grownups Awards	January 28, 2023	Best Intergenerational Film	The Fabelmans	Nominated	
AARP Movies for Grownups Awards	January 28, 2023	Best Time Capsule	The Fabelmans	Nominated	
Academy Awards	March 12, 2023	Best Picture	Kristie Macosko Krieger, Steven Spielberg and Tony Kushner	Nominated	
Academy Awards	March 12, 2023	Best Director	Steven Spielberg	Nominated	
Academy Awards	March 12, 2023	Best Actress	Michelle Williams	Nominated	
Academy Awards	March 12, 2023	Best Supporting Actor	Judd Hirsch	Nominated	
Academy Awards	March 12, 2023	Best Original Screenplay	Steven Spielberg and Tony Kushner	Nominated	
Academy Awards	March 12, 2023	Best Original Score	John Williams	Nominated	
Academy Awards	March 12, 2023	Best Production Design	Production Design: Rick Carter; Set Decoration: Karen O'Hara	Nominated	
Alliance of Women Film Journalists	January 5, 2023	Best Picture	The Fabelmans	Nominated	
Alliance of Women Film Journalists	January 5, 2023	Best Director	Steven Spielberg	Nominated	
Alliance of Women Film Journalists	January 5, 2023	Best Original Screenplay	Steven Spielberg and Tony Kushner	Nominated	
Alliance of Women Film Journalists	January 5, 2023	Best Cinematography	Janusz Kamiński	Nominated	
American Film Institute Awards	December 9, 2022	Top 10 Films of the Year	The Fabelmans	Won	
Art Directors Guild	February 18, 2023	Excellence in Production Design for a Period Film	Rick Carter	Nominated	
Artios Awards	March 9, 2023	Big Budget - Drama	Cindy Tolan and Nicholas Petrovich (associate casting director)	Won	
British Academy Film Awards	February 19, 2023	Best Original Screenplay	Steven Spielberg and Tony Kushner	Nominated	
California On Location Awards	November 21, 2022	Location Team of the Year - Studio Feature Film	The Fabelmans	Nominated	
Chicago Film Critics Association	December 14, 2022	Best Supporting Actress	Michelle Williams	Nominated	
Chicago Film Critics Association	December 14, 2022	Best Original Screenplay	Steven Spielberg and Tony Kushner	Nominated	
Cinema for Peace Awards	February 24, 2023	Cinema for Peace Dove for The Most Valuable Film of the Year 2023	The Fabelmans	Nominated	
Critics' Choice Awards	January 15, 2023	Best Picture	The Fabelmans	Nominated	
Critics' Choice Awards	January 15, 2023	Best Director	Steven Spielberg	Nominated	
Critics' Choice Awards	January 15, 2023	Best Actress	Michelle Williams	Nominated	
Critics' Choice Awards	January 15, 2023	Best Supporting Actor	Paul Dano	Nominated	
Critics' Choice Awards	January 15, 2023	Best Supporting Actor	Judd Hirsch	Nominated	
Critics' Choice Awards	January 15, 2023	Best Young Actor/Actress	Gabriel LaBelle	Won	
Critics' Choice Awards	January 15, 2023	Best Acting Ensemble	Cast of The Fabelmans	Nominated	
Critics' Choice Awards	January 15, 2023	Best Original Screenplay	Steven Spielberg and Tony Kushner	Nominated	
Critics' Choice Awards	January 15, 2023	Best Cinematography	Janusz Kamiński	Nominated	
Critics' Choice Awards	January 15, 2023	Best Production Design	Rick Carter and Karen O'Hara	Nominated	
Critics' Choice Awards	January 15, 2023	Best Score	John Williams	Nominated	
Dallas–Fort Worth Film Critics Association	December 19, 2022	Best Picture	The Fabelmans	Nominated	
Dallas–Fort Worth Film Critics Association	December 19, 2022	Best Actress	Michelle Williams	Nominated	
Dallas–Fort Worth Film Critics Association	December 19, 2022	Best Supporting Actor	Paul Dano	Nominated	
Dallas–Fort Worth Film Critics Association	December 19, 2022	Best Director	Steven Spielberg	Nominated	
Dallas–Fort Worth Film Critics Association	December 19, 2022	Best Musical Score	John Williams	Nominated	
David di Donatello Awards	May 10, 2023	Best Foreign Film	The Fabelmans	Won	
Directors Guild of America	February 18, 2023	Outstanding Directing – Feature Film	Steven Spielberg	Nominated	
Dorian Awards	February 23, 2022	Film of the Year	The Fabelmans	Nominated	
Dorian Awards	February 23, 2022	"We're Wilde About You!" Rising Star Award	Gabriel LaBelle	Nominated	
Florida Film Critics Circle	December 22, 2022	Best Picture	The Fabelmans	Nominated	
Florida Film Critics Circle	December 22, 2022	Best Director	Steven Spielberg	Runner-up	
Florida Film Critics Circle	December 22, 2022	Best Actress	Michelle Williams	Nominated	
Florida Film Critics Circle	December 22, 2022	Best Supporting Actor	Paul Dano	Runner-up	
Florida Film Critics Circle	December 22, 2022	Best Ensemble	Cast of The Fabelmans	Nominated	
Florida Film Critics Circle	December 22, 2022	Best Original Screenplay	Steven Spielberg and Tony Kushner	Nominated	
Florida Film Critics Circle	December 22, 2022	Best Cinematography	Janusz Kamiński	Nominated	
Florida Film Critics Circle	December 22, 2022	Best Score	John Williams	Nominated	
Georgia Film Critics Association	January 13, 2023	Best Picture	The Fabelmans	Nominated	
Georgia Film Critics Association	January 13, 2023	Best Director	Steven Spielberg	Runner-up	
Georgia Film Critics Association	January 13, 2023	Best Actress	Michelle Williams	Nominated	
Georgia Film Critics Association	January 13, 2023	Best Supporting Actor	Judd Hirsch	Nominated	
Georgia Film Critics Association	January 13, 2023	Best Original Screenplay	Steven Spielberg and Tony Kushner	Nominated	
Georgia Film Critics Association	January 13, 2023	Best Cinematography	Janusz Kamiński	Nominated	
Georgia Film Critics Association	January 13, 2023	Best Original Score	John Williams	Nominated	
Georgia Film Critics Association	January 13, 2023	Best Ensemble	The Fabelmans	Nominated	
Georgia Film Critics Association	January 13, 2023	Breakthrough Award	Gabriel LaBelle	Runner-up	
Golden Globe Awards	January 10, 2023	Best Motion Picture – Drama	The Fabelmans	Won	
Golden Globe Awards	January 10, 2023	Best Director	Steven Spielberg	Won	
Golden Globe Awards	January 10, 2023	Best Actress in a Motion Picture – Drama	Michelle Williams	Nominated	
Golden Globe Awards	January 10, 2023	Best Screenplay	Steven Spielberg and Tony Kushner	Nominated	
Golden Globe Awards	January 10, 2023	Best Original Score	John Williams	Nominated	
Grammy Awards	February 4, 2024	Best Score Soundtrack for Visual Media	John Williams	Nominated	
Heartland Film Festival	October 16, 2022	Truly Moving Picture Award	Steven Spielberg	Won	
Hollywood Critics Association	February 24, 2023	Best Picture	The Fabelmans	Nominated	
Hollywood Critics Association	February 24, 2023	Best Director	Steven Spielberg	Nominated	
Hollywood Critics Association	February 24, 2023	Best Actress	Michelle Williams	Nominated	
Hollywood Critics Association	February 24, 2023	Best Original Screenplay	Steven Spielberg and Tony Kushner	Nominated	
Hollywood Critics Association	February 24, 2023	Star on the Rise Award	Gabriel LaBelle	Won	
Hollywood Critics Association	February 24, 2023	Artisan Achievement Award	Rick Carter	Won	
Hollywood Critics Association Creative Arts Awards	February 17, 2023	Best Cinematography	Janusz Kamiński	Nominated	
Hollywood Post Alliance Awards	November 30, 2023	Outstanding Color Grading – Feature Film	Michael Hatzer	Nominated	
International Cinephile Society	February 12, 2023	Best Picture	The Fabelmans	7th place	
International Cinephile Society	February 12, 2023	Best Supporting Actress	Michelle Williams	Nominated	
International Cinephile Society	February 12, 2023	Best Ensemble	Cast of The Fabelmans	Nominated	
International Cinephile Society	February 12, 2023	Best Breakthrough Performance	Gabriel LaBelle	Nominated	
London Film Critics' Circle	February 5, 2023	Film of the Year	The Fabelmans	Nominated	
London Film Critics' Circle	February 5, 2023	Screenwriter of the Year	Steven Spielberg and Tony Kushner	Nominated	
Miami International Film Festival	November 3, 2022	Precious Gem Award	Paul Dano	Won	
National Board of Review	December 8, 2022	Top Ten Films	The Fabelmans	Won	
National Board of Review	December 8, 2022	Best Director	Steven Spielberg	Won	
National Board of Review	December 8, 2022	Breakthrough Performance	Gabriel LaBelle (Note: Shared with Danielle Deadwyler for Till)	Won	
National Society of Film Critics	January 7, 2023	Best Actress	Michelle Williams	3rd place	
New York Film Critics Online	December 11, 2022	Top 10 Films of 2022	The Fabelmans	Won	
Palm Springs International Film Festival	January 5, 2023	Chairman's Vanguard Award	Steven Spielberg, Michelle Williams, Paul Dano, Seth Rogen, Gabriel LaBelle and Judd Hirsch	Won	
Paris Film Critics Association Awards	February 4, 2024	Best Film	The Fabelmans	Nominated	
Paris Film Critics Association Awards	February 4, 2024	Best Director	Steven Spielberg	Nominated	
Paris Film Critics Association Awards	February 4, 2024	Best Supporting Actress	Michelle Williams	Nominated	
Paris Film Critics Association Awards	February 4, 2024	Best Male Revelation	Gabriel LaBelle	Nominated	
Paris Film Critics Association Awards	February 4, 2024	Best Original Screenplay	Steven Spielberg and Tony Kushner	Nominated	
Paris Film Critics Association Awards	February 4, 2024	Best Cinematography	Janusz Kamiński	Nominated	
Paris Film Critics Association Awards	February 4, 2024	Best Original Score	John Williams	Nominated	
Paris Film Critics Association Awards	February 4, 2024	Best Production Design	Rick Carter	Nominated	
Producers Guild of America Awards	February 25, 2023	Outstanding Producer of Theatrical Motion Pictures	Steven Spielberg, Kristie Macosko Krieger, and Tony Kushner	Nominated	
San Diego Film Critics Society	January 6, 2023	Best Picture	The Fabelmans	Nominated	
San Diego Film Critics Society	January 6, 2023	Best Director	Steven Spielberg	Runner-up	
San Diego Film Critics Society	January 6, 2023	Best Actor	Gabriel LaBelle	Nominated	
San Diego Film Critics Society	January 6, 2023	Best Actress	Michelle Williams	Nominated	
San Diego Film Critics Society	January 6, 2023	Best Editing	Sarah Broshar and Michael Kahn	Runner-up	
San Diego Film Critics Society	January 6, 2023	Best Cinematography	Janusz Kamiński	Nominated	
San Diego Film Critics Society	January 6, 2023	Best Production Design	Rick Carter	Runner-up	
San Diego Film Critics Society	January 6, 2023	Best Use of Music	John Williams	Nominated	
San Francisco Bay Area Film Critics Circle	January 9, 2023	Best Film	The Fabelmans	Nominated	
San Francisco Bay Area Film Critics Circle	January 9, 2023	Best Director	Steven Spielberg	Nominated	
San Francisco Bay Area Film Critics Circle	January 9, 2023	Best Original Screenplay	Steven Spielberg and Tony Kushner	Nominated	
San Francisco Bay Area Film Critics Circle	January 9, 2023	Best Cinematography	Janusz Kaminski	Nominated	
San Francisco Bay Area Film Critics Circle	January 9, 2023	Best Original Score	John Williams	Nominated	
San Luis Obispo International Film Festival	April 29, 2023	Spotlight Award	Judd Hirsch	Won	
San Luis Obispo International Film Festival	April 29, 2023	King Vidor Award	Rick Carter	Won	
Satellite Awards	February 11, 2023	Best Motion Picture – Drama	The Fabelmans	Nominated	
Satellite Awards	February 11, 2023	Best Director	Steven Spielberg	Nominated	
Satellite Awards	February 11, 2023	Best Actor in a Motion Picture – Drama	Gabriel LaBelle	Nominated	
Satellite Awards	February 11, 2023	Best Actress in a Motion Picture – Drama	Michelle Williams	Nominated	
Satellite Awards	February 11, 2023	Best Supporting Actor – Motion Picture	Paul Dano	Nominated	
Satellite Awards	February 11, 2023	Best Original Screenplay	Steven Spielberg and Tony Kushner	Nominated	
Satellite Awards	February 11, 2023	Best Film Editing	Sarah Broshar and Michael Kahn	Nominated	
Satellite Awards	February 11, 2023	Best Art Direction and Production Design	Rick Carter	Nominated	
Satellite Awards	February 11, 2023	Best Original Score	John Williams	Nominated	
St. Louis Film Critics Association	December 18, 2022	Best Director	Steven Spielberg	Nominated	
St. Louis Film Critics Association	December 18, 2022	Best Actress	Michelle Williams	Nominated	
St. Louis Film Critics Association	December 18, 2022	Best Supporting Actor	Judd Hirsch	Nominated	
St. Louis Film Critics Association	December 18, 2022	Best Ensemble	Cast of The Fabelmans	Nominated	
St. Louis Film Critics Association	December 18, 2022	Best Original Screenplay	Steven Spielberg and Tony Kushner	Nominated	
St. Louis Film Critics Association	December 18, 2022	Best Costume Design	Mark Bridges	Nominated	
St. Louis Film Critics Association	December 18, 2022	Best Score	John Williams	Nominated	
St. Louis Film Critics Association	December 18, 2022	Best Scene	Sam Fabelman meets one of his idols on the studio lot	Won	
Screen Actors Guild Awards	February 26, 2023	Outstanding Performance by a Cast in a Motion Picture	Jeannie Berlin, Paul Dano, Judd Hirsch, Gabriel LaBelle, David Lynch, Seth Rogen and Michelle Williams	Nominated	
Screen Actors Guild Awards	February 26, 2023	Outstanding Performance by a Male Actor in a Supporting Role	Paul Dano	Nominated	
Set Decorators Society of America	February 14, 2023	Best Achievement in Decor/Design of a Period Feature Film	Rick Carter and Karen O'Hara	Nominated	
Toronto International Film Festival	September 18, 2022	People's Choice Award	The Fabelmans	Won	
Visual Effects Society Awards	February 15, 2023	Outstanding Supporting Visual Effects in a Photoreal Feature	Pablo Helman, Jennifer Mizener, Cernogorods Aleksei, Jeff Kalmus, Mark Hawker	Nominated	
Washington D.C. Area Film Critics Association	December 12, 2022	Best Film	The Fabelmans	Nominated	
Washington D.C. Area Film Critics Association	December 12, 2022	Best Director	Steven Spielberg	Nominated	
Washington D.C. Area Film Critics Association	December 12, 2022	Best Actress	Michelle Williams	Nominated	
Washington D.C. Area Film Critics Association	December 12, 2022	Best Supporting Actor	Paul Dano	Nominated	
Washington D.C. Area Film Critics Association	December 12, 2022	Best Cinematography	Janusz Kaminski	Nominated	
Washington D.C. Area Film Critics Association	December 12, 2022	Best Editing	Sarah Broshar and Michael Kahn	Nominated	
Washington D.C. Area Film Critics Association	December 12, 2022	Best Score	John Williams	Nominated	
Washington D.C. Area Film Critics Association	December 12, 2022	Best Production Design	Rick Carter and Karen O'Hara	Nominated	
Washington D.C. Area Film Critics Association	December 12, 2022	Best Acting Ensemble	Cast of The Fabelmans	Nominated	
Washington D.C. Area Film Critics Association	December 12, 2022	Best Youth Performance	Gabriel LaBelle	Won	
World Soundtrack Awards	October 21, 2023	Film Composer of the Year	John Williams (Note: also for Indiana Jones and the Dial of Destiny)	Nominated	
Writers Guild of America Awards	March 5, 2023	Best Original Screenplay	Steven Spielberg and Tony Kushner	Nominated	
