= Spielberg (disambiguation) =

Steven Spielberg (born 1946) is an American film director and producer.

Spielberg may also refer to:

- Spielberg (surname)
- Spielberg, Styria, a city in Styria, Austria, location of the Formula 1 Austrian Grand Prix
- Spielberg (Baden), village in the municipality of Karlsbad, Baden-Württemberg, Germany
- Špilberk Castle in Brno, Czech Republic
- 25930 Spielberg, main-belt asteroid
- SV Spielberg, German football club
- Spielberg (film), a 2017 HBO documentary film centered on the career of Steven Spielberg
