= Spilberg =

Spilberg is a surname. Notable people with the surname include:

- Adriana Spilberg (1652–1700), Dutch Golden Age painter
- Johannes Spilberg (1619–1690), German Baroque painter

== See also ==
- Spielberg (surname)
