= Nancy Spielberg =

American film producer (born 1956)

- Born: Nancy Spielberg; June 7, 1956 (age 70); Camden, New Jersey, U.S.
- Education: Arizona State University; UCLA; Sarah Lawrence College; The New School
- Occupation: Film producer
- Years active: 1977–present
- Spouse: Shimon Katz (m. 1991)
- Children: 2
- Father: Arnold Spielberg
- Relatives: Steven Spielberg (brother); Anne Spielberg (sister); Kate Capshaw (sister-in-law)

Nancy Spielberg (born June 7, 1956) is an American film producer. She has produced multiple documentaries on Jewish and Israeli history and is the third and youngest sister of director and producer Steven Spielberg.

== Early life and education ==
She was born on June 7, 1956, the youngest of four children. Seven months after she was born, her family moved to Phoenix, Arizona in February 1957 where her father, Arnold Spielberg, worked as a computer scientist at General Electric. Her family was not particularly religious, attending synagogue only a couple of times each year, but often had Shabbat meals. Spielberg and her family were the target of occasional antisemitic remarks by neighbors and classmates at Phoenix public schools.

The family relocated to California, where Nancy's parents divorced in 1966. Following the split, Spielberg returned to Arizona with her mother. She began attending an Orthodox Jewish school in the fifth grade, along with her elder sister Anne. The household also began keeping kosher.

Spielberg attended Arizona State University and UCLA and later studied writing at Sarah Lawrence College and The New School in New York.

== Career ==
Spielberg produced the 2014 documentary Above and Beyond, about the founding of the Israeli Air Force.

In 2016, Spielberg was a co-executive producer for the documentary On the Map, directed by Dani Menkin, about the Israeli national basketball team, winners of 1977 European Cup. She worked again with Menkin while producing the 2019 documentary Picture of His Life, about Israeli nature photographer Amos Nachoum, and the 2020 documentary Aulcie, about the titular basketball player Aulcie Perry.

In 2021, Spielberg became a part of Jewish Story Partners, an initiative launched by her brother and his wife.

In 2022, Spielberg served as a consultant for her brother's The Fabelmans, the film of a Tony Kushner script based on Steven's childhood.

== Filmography ==
Year	Film	Role	Notes	Ref
2003	Chernobyl Heart	Consultant		
2011	Elusive Justice: The Search for Nazi War Criminals	Executive producer		
2014	Above and Beyond	Producer		
2016	On the Map	Co-executive producer		
2017	Who Will Write Our History	Producer		
2019	Picture of His Life	Executive producer		
2020	Aulcie	Executive producer		
2022	The Fabelmans	Consultant		
2023	Closed Circuit	Producer		
2023	Vishniac	Executive producer		
2025	A Letter to David	Producer		

== Personal life ==
In 1983, Spielberg married Shimon Katz. The couple had two daughters: Jessica Katz, who performed on The Voice Israel in 2014, and Melissa Katz.

As of 2015, Spielberg and her husband lived in Riverdale, New York. Spielberg considers herself a Modern Orthodox Jew.
