= Above and Beyond (2014 film) =

- Directed by: Roberta Grossman
- Written by: Sophie Sartain
- Produced by: Nancy Spielberg
- Cinematography: Harris Done
- Edited by: Chris Callister
- Music by: Lorne Balfe; Hans Zimmer's Studio
- Production company: Playmount Productions
- Distributed by: International Film Circuit
- Release date: July 15, 2014
- Running time: 90 minutes
- Countries: United States; United Kingdom; Israel
- Language: English
- Box office: $288,751 (US)

Above and Beyond is a 2014 documentary film about Mahal, produced by Nancy Spielberg, the youngest sister of Steven Spielberg, (known for Nazi Hunt: Elusive Justice (2011)), written by Sophie Sartain (known for Blessed Is the Match: The Life and Death of Hannah Senesh (2011)), and directed by Roberta Grossman (who also worked on Blessed Is the Match: The Life and Death of Hannah Senesh).

Above and Beyond documents the story of four American, foreign, and Israeli pilots who flew warplanes to help defend the new state of Israel during the 1948 Arab–Israeli War against Arab armies that sought to destroy the new country. The film was notable with the cinematography of Harris Done (The Last Days (1998)), special effects by Industrial Light and Magic, and an original score from Hans Zimmer's Studio. The film won the Philadelphia Jewish Film Festival 34 Best Documentary Audience Award.

== Synopsis ==
In 1948, the new state of Israel is about to declare its independence after Mandatory Palestine is partitioned. The surrounding Arab states are about to launch an invasion with overwhelming superiority in numbers and weaponry compared to the emergent Israeli defences. With no air force or aircraft, American and other foreign pilots are called upon to start a nascent military air force. The first aircraft are bought from the massive U.S. government surplus stocks, and are former USAF Curtiss C-46 Commando transports, used in shipping war materiel back to Israel. Many pilots volunteered to join the Air Force in fear of a second Holocaust occurring.

Facing restrictions that precluded help to belligerent nations, the first volunteers who choose to help have to find ways to work around U.S. government regulations. Al Schwimmer, a U.S. citizen, later charged with violating U.S. neutrality, takes charge of a transport operation. He registered the C-46 transports to Panama as Lineas Aereas de Panama aircraft, and flew them to Israel via a circuitous route that includes Natal, Brazil, Casablanca, Morocco, and Rome, which becomes the headquarters of the volunteer fighter pilots. The Air Force were permitted to bring five aircraft with them to battle. Chief among the group is Canadian "Ace-of-aces" George "Buzz" Beurling, who dies in a mysterious crash while testing a Noorduyn Norseman light transport. When asked about their feelings, Schwimmer replied, "we were proud that we were finally doing something for our homeland."

With the assistance of officials in Czechoslovakia, a number of Avia S-199 fighter aircraft, a variant of the Messerschmitt Bf 109, were obtained. The fighter pilots who trained in Czechoslovakia include Lou Lenart, Leon Frankel, Harold Livingston, Milton Rubenfeld (father of Paul Reubens AKA Pee Wee Herman), George Lichter, and Gideon Lichtman. Universally, the trainees hated the Avia S-199, called the "Messer-shitt" by Lichtman. After transporting the fighter aircraft to Israel, the first four aircraft are deployed to attack an Egyptian armored column moving on Tel Aviv. With the attack taking the enemy by surprise, the Egyptians retreat. Other air attacks help to bring about a truce between the combatants. During the truce, Israeli volunteers in the United States manage to purchase and smuggle two Boeing B-17 Flying Fortress bombers out of the country. When war is declared again, the B-17s are in the air, overflying the Middle East, and divert to an attack on Cairo.

Aerial prowess proves to be a deciding factor in the coming battles, as a group of Supermarine Spitfire LF Mk IXE fighter aircraft is purchased from Czechoslovakia. Israeli fighter pilots flying a mix of Avia S-199s and Spitfires tangled with Egyptian Spitfires, with the first air-to-air combat ending with Gideon Lichtman bringing down an Egyptian Spitfire, albeit in his "Messer-shitt". As the volunteer-driven program becomes more organized, with leaders such as Modi Alon, "Smoky" Simon, Ezer Weizman, and Dani Shapira taking charge, a strong Israeli Air Force is created. Unfortunately, two of the pilots who volunteered died.

== Cast ==
- Shimon Peres as himself
- Paul Reubens as himself
- Judy Rubenfeld as herself
- Dani Shapira as himself
- Mina Alon as herself
- Michal Gonen as herself
- Harold Livingston as himself
- Lou Lenart as himself
- Leon Frankel as himself
- George Lichter as himself
- Gideon Lichtman as himself
- Coleman Goldstein as himself
- Mike van den Dobbelsteen as Israeli Ground Crew

== Production ==
Above and Beyond was filmed in the United States, the United Kingdom, and Israel. Interviews with former Israeli Air Force pilots and their families included an extended interview with Paul Reubens (born Rubenfeld) and his mother, describing the combat career of his father, Milton Rubenfeld, one of the first American volunteers to go to Israel.

The aerial sequences in the film were "a mix of archive footage seamlessly edited with special effects from Industrial Light and Magic ..." Actual aircraft included the Curtiss C-46 Commando and de Havilland Canada DHC-2 Beaver transports as well as examples of the Hispano Aviación HA-1112 fighter aircraft that had flown in the Battle of Britain (1969), and were a lookalike for the Avia S-199 fighter aircraft used in 1948.

== Reception ==
Above and Beyond was critically reviewed by Ben Keningsberg for The New York Times. He said, in part, "Drawing on interviews with historians and the surviving pilots, as well as re-enactments and archival footage, 'Above and Beyond' is partly a procedural. It explains how the pilots hopscotched countries to evade detection. (According to the film, Americans who helped Israel’s military risked jeopardizing their United States citizenship.) Some of the planes used were manufactured at a factory in Czechoslovakia that only years earlier had served the Germans. The men unabashedly reminisce about how their missions earned them female admirers. These fond recollections of derring-do hail from a different era, and the movie’s one-sided view of history is bound to start arguments. The film is best appreciated as a straightforward testimonial: old war buddies’ hurrah against anti-Semitism."
