= BIZMAC =

RCA vacuum tube computer (1956–1962)

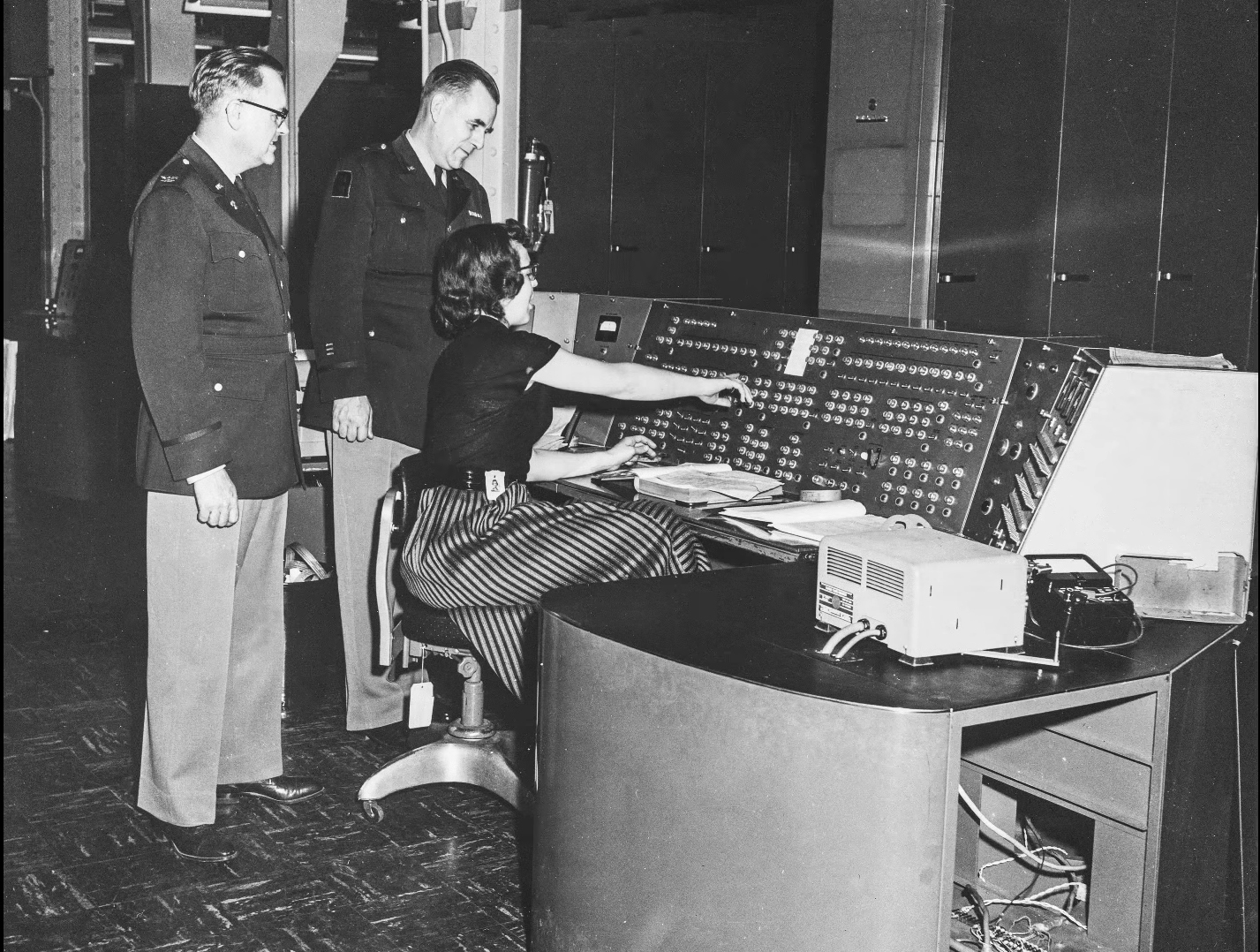
BIZMAC

The RCA BIZMAC was a vacuum-tube computer manufactured by RCA from 1956 to 1962. Although RCA was noted for their pioneering work in transistors, the company decided to build a vacuum-tube computer instead of a transistorized computer. It was the largest vacuum-tube computer of its time in 1956, occupying 20,000 sq ft (1,900 m^{2}) of floor space with up to 30,000 tubes, 70,000 diodes, and 35,000 magnetic cores. It weighed about 26,500 lb (12,000 kg).

== History ==
In 1949, the Mutual Assistance Program (MAP)—later known as the Military Assistance Program—was started by the United States to provide military assistance and supplies to foreign countries needing to rebuild their military defenses after World War II.

In 1951, RCA was awarded a $4.5 million military contract to build a data processing machine to support the logistics necessary for the MAP. The result was the BIZMAC computer system.

The first BIZMAC machine was installed at the Ordnance Tank-Automotive Command (OTAC) in Detroit, Michigan in 1956. Eventually, BIZMAC computer systems were also installed at Higbee Department Stores, Travelers Insurance Company, and New York Life Insurance Company.

The huge BIZMAC system was very quickly made obsolete by faster and more reliable computer systems, including IBM's 705 computer as well as RCA's own transistorized 501 computer. The BIZMAC was taken offline from the OTAC in 1962. Only about six BIZMAC computers were actually made.

== Features ==
A unique feature of the BIZMAC was the use of hundreds of permanently mounted tape drives. This meant that tape data could be accessed immediately without constant mounting and dismounting individual tapes.

== Engineers ==
One of the original engineers of the BIZMAC was Arnold Spielberg, the father of film director and producer Steven Spielberg. Spielberg designed and patented an electronic library system used for searching data stored on magnetic tapes.

== See also ==
- List of vacuum-tube computers
- History of computing hardware
