= Spielberg (film) =

2017 documentary film

- Television release poster
- Directed by: Susan Lacy
- Produced by: Susan Lacy; Jessica Levin; Emma Pildes
- Starring: Steven Spielberg
- Cinematography: Ed Marritz; Samuel Painter
- Edited by: Deborah Peretz
- Production companies: HBO Documentary Films; Pentimento Productions
- Distributed by: HBO
- Release dates: October 5, 2017 (New York Film Festival); October 7, 2017
- Running time: 146 minutes
- Country: United States
- Language: English

Spielberg is a 2017 American documentary film directed by Susan Lacy, and is centered on the career of film director Steven Spielberg. It premiered at the 2017 New York Film Festival and aired on HBO on October 7, 2017.

The documentary chronicles Spielberg's career, including interviews with collaborators, family and friends. Some of the events explored, particularly of his early life, would go on to be dramatized in Spielberg's 2022 semi-autobiographical film The Fabelmans.

== Interviews ==
- J. J. Abrams
- Leah Adler †
- Bob Balaban
- Christian Bale
- Eric Bana
- Drew Barrymore
- Cate Blanchett
- Steven Bochco
- James Brolin
- Bill Butler
- Rick Carter
- Francis Ford Coppola
- Peter Coyote
- Daniel Craig
- Tom Cruise
- Daniel Day-Lewis
- Brian De Palma
- Laura Dern
- Leonardo DiCaprio
- Richard Dreyfuss
- David Edelstein
- Roger Ernest
- Sally Field
- Ralph Fiennes
- Harrison Ford
- David Geffen
- Jeff Goldblum
- Doris Kearns Goodwin
- Tom Hanks
- J. Hoberman
- Dustin Hoffman
- Norman Howell
- Holly Hunter
- Annette Insdorf
- Joanna Johnston
- Michael Kahn
- Janusz Kaminski
- Lawrence Kasdan
- Jeffrey Katzenberg
- Ben Kingsley
- Kathleen Kennedy
- David Koepp
- Tony Kushner
- George Lucas
- Laurie MacDonald
- Frank Marshall
- Janet Maslin
- Melissa Mathison †
- Todd McCarthy
- Ronald Meyer
- Dennis Muren
- Liam Neeson
- Walter Parkes
- Michael Phillips
- Martin Scorsese
- A. O. Scott
- Sid Sheinberg
- Adam Somner
- Anne Spielberg
- Arnold Spielberg
- Nancy Spielberg
- Sue Spielberg
- Tom Stoppard
- John Williams
- Oprah Winfrey
- Robert Zemeckis
- Vilmos Zsigmond †

Interviews with Karen Allen, Benedict Cumberbatch, Anthony Hopkins and Jude Law were also conducted but not included in the final film.

Archive footage was also shown of Joan Crawford, Goldie Hawn, Amy Irving, Marcia Lucas, Dan Rather, Dinah Shore, Sasha Spielberg, and Theo Spielberg.

† = Person interviewed died prior to the documentary's airing.

== Production ==
The documentary was announced in July 2017 by HBO, with it set to air on October 7 later that year. A trailer for the documentary was released in September, with a list of those interviewed released as well.

== Release ==
Prior to its October 7 airing on the HBO channel, the documentary was screened at the 2017 New York Film Festival.

=== Critical response ===
On review aggregator website Rotten Tomatoes, the film has an approval rating of 92% based on 37 reviews and an average rating of 7.6/10. The website's critical consensus reads, "Spielberg takes a behind-the-scenes look at one of modern cinema's most spellbinding talents, with absorbing—albeit somewhat uncritical—results." On Metacritic, the film has a weighted average score of 71 out of 100 based 14 critics, indicating "generally favorable reviews".

== See also ==
- The Fabelmans, Spielberg's 2022 semi-autobiographical coming-of-age film that dramatizes some of the events of his early life through an original story of young aspiring filmmaker Sammy Fabelman, a character based on Spielberg.
