= The Fabelmans =

2022 film by Steven Spielberg

- Theatrical release poster
- Directed by: Steven Spielberg
- Written by: Steven Spielberg; Tony Kushner
- Produced by: Kristie Macosko Krieger; Steven Spielberg; Tony Kushner
- Starring: Michelle Williams; Paul Dano; Seth Rogen; Gabriel LaBelle; Judd Hirsch
- Cinematography: Janusz Kamiński
- Edited by: Michael Kahn; Sarah Broshar
- Music by: John Williams
- Production companies: Amblin Entertainment; Reliance Entertainment
- Distributed by: Universal Pictures
- Release dates: September 10, 2022 (TIFF); November 11, 2022 (United States)
- Running time: 151 minutes
- Country: United States
- Language: English
- Budget: $40 million
- Box office: $45.6 million

The Fabelmans is a 2022 American coming-of-age drama film directed and produced by Steven Spielberg, who co-wrote the screenplay with Tony Kushner. Loosely based on Spielberg's early life and beginnings as a filmmaker, the semi-autobiographical film follows Sammy Fabelman, a young aspiring filmmaker who explores how the power of films can help him see the truth about his dysfunctional family and those around him. It stars Gabriel LaBelle as Sammy, alongside Michelle Williams, Paul Dano, Seth Rogen, Judd Hirsch, and David Lynch (in his final acting role before his death in 2025) in supporting roles.

Spielberg had conceived the project as early as 1999, with his sister Anne writing a screenplay titled I'll Be Home. Spielberg postponed the project for 20 years due to concerns about how it might affect his parents. He revisited it in 2019 with screenwriter and frequent collaborator Kushner while they were making West Side Story, and the screenplay was completed in late 2020. Development of the film began soon after, with casting taking place between March and May 2021. Principal photography began that July in Los Angeles and wrapped in September. The film is dedicated to the memories of Spielberg's parents, Leah Adler and Arnold Spielberg, who died in 2017 and 2020, respectively.

The Fabelmans premiered at the Toronto International Film Festival on September 10, 2022, where it won the People's Choice Award. Distributed by Universal Pictures, the film opened as a limited theatrical release in the United States on November 11, 2022, and then expanded to a wide release on November 23. It grossed $45.6 million on a $40 million budget. It received critical acclaim and was named one of the top ten films of 2022 by the National Board of Review and the American Film Institute, and was considered a return to form for Spielberg. The Fabelmans earned numerous awards and nominations including seven nominations at the 95th Academy Awards, including Best Picture, Best Director, Best Actress (Williams), and Best Supporting Actor (Hirsch). It also earned 11 nominations at the 28th Critics' Choice Awards, winning Best Young Performer (LaBelle), and five nominations at the 80th Golden Globe Awards, winning Best Motion Picture – Drama and Best Director.

== Plot ==
In 1952, Haddon Township, New Jersey, Jewish couple Mitzi and Burt Fabelman take their young son Sammy to see his first film: The Greatest Show on Earth. Dazzled by a train scene, Sammy asks for a model set for Hanukkah, which he crashes late one night. Mitzi allows him to shoot another crash scene using Burt's 8 mm camera. Sammy begins filming regularly, sometimes involving his sisters. Burt is offered a new job in Phoenix, Arizona, where he and the family move in 1957. At Mitzi's insistence, Burt's best friend and business partner, Bennie Loewy, goes, too.

Years later, teenage Sammy makes films with his friends in the Boy Scouts, begins using post-production effects, and earns a badge in photography. Later, the Fabelmans, including Bennie, take a camping trip with Sammy taking footage of their vacation. Mitzi's mother later dies, leaving her distraught. Burt gives Sammy editing equipment and asks him to make a vacation film to cheer Mitzi up. Sammy objects, but Burt insists, dismissing filmmaking as a mere hobby. The next morning, the Fabelmans receive a visit from Mitzi's uncle Boris, a former lion tamer and film worker. That night, he speaks with Sammy about compromising his family with art, saying that both aspects will always be at odds with one another. Boris leaves, and Sammy begins editing the vacation footage, during which he finds evidence of Mitzi and Bennie having an affair. Sammy and Mitzi get into an argument after weeks of him treating her and Bennie harshly. In a fit of rage, she slaps him across the back after he shouts that he wishes she were not his mother. Distraught, Sammy shows her the compiled footage and promises to keep their secret.

The following week, Burt receives another promotion, requiring another move to Saratoga, California. Bennie stays in Phoenix, but not before giving Sammy a new camera. Sammy refuses it until Bennie lets him pay $35 for it, but slips it back in Sammy's pocket when they hug goodbye. Despite receiving the camera, Sammy decides never to use it. After arriving in his new neighborhood and school, Sammy becomes targeted by students Logan and Chad, who subject him to antisemitic abuse. He begins dating the devoutly Christian Monica. While having dinner with the Fabelmans, she suggests that Sammy film their Ditch Day at the beach, something he accepts after Monica mentions that her father owns a 16 mm Arriflex camera that he would let him use.

Mitzi and Burt announce they are divorcing due to her depression and his discovery of the affair. At prom, Sammy declares his love for Monica and asks her to come with him to Hollywood after high school. Unwilling to throw away her own life's plans to attend Texas A&M University, she breaks up with him. The Ditch Day 1964 film is played in front of Sammy's peers to a rapturous response. It glorifies Logan and humiliates Chad. Sammy is distraught that Monica just broke up with him, and he disappears to a school corridor. Logan finds and confronts Sammy, confused and emotional over his positive portrayal. Chad finds them and tries to attack Sammy, but Logan defends him. Logan threatens Sammy to never tell anyone that he got emotional and offers him a puff on his marijuana cigarette. Sammy agrees to keep this secret but jokes that he might make a movie about it.

The following year, Sammy is living with his father in Hollywood. He wants to drop out of college but cannot find work in filmmaking. Burt grudgingly accepts his son's passion and tells Sammy to keep on his path if it makes him happy. Sammy receives an offer to work on Hogan's Heroes. Knowing that he is more interested in filmmaking, show co-creator Bernard Fein invites Sammy to meet director John Ford, one of his greatest influences. During their brief meeting, Ford offers Sammy some pointers on framing, insisting that he never place the horizon in the center of the frame. Newly invigorated, Sammy walks through the studio backlot, the shot adjusting itself to match Ford's advice.

== Cast ==
- Michelle Williams as Mitzi Fabelman, Sammy's encouraging but tempestuous mother and a skilled pianist who suffers from untreated mental illness.
- Paul Dano as Burt Fabelman, Sammy's down-to-earth father and a computer engineer.
- Seth Rogen as Bennie Loewy, Burt's co-worker and best friend who is a surrogate uncle to Sammy and has an affair with his mother.
- Gabriel LaBelle as Sammy Fabelman, the sixteen-year-old son of the family who aspires to become a filmmaker. He is based on Spielberg.
  - Mateo Zoryan Francis-DeFord as young Sammy
- Keeley Karsten as Natalie Fabelman, Sammy's second younger sister.
  - Alina Brace as young Natalie
- Julia Butters as Regina "Reggie" Fabelman, the first younger sister of Sammy who has a strained relationship with him.
  - Birdie Borria as young Reggie
- Judd Hirsch as Boris Podgorny, Sammy's eccentric granduncle and a former film worker and circus performer.
- Sophia Kopera as Lisa Fabelman, Sammy's third younger sister.
- Jeannie Berlin as Hadassah Fabelman, Burt's mother.
- Robin Bartlett as Tina Schildkraut, Mitzi's mother.
- Sam Rechner as Logan Hall, a high school bully.
- Oakes Fegley as Chad Thomas, another high school bully.
- Chloe East as Monica Sherwood, a religious, boy-crazy high school student and Sammy's love interest.
- Isabelle Kusman as Claudia Denning, a classmate and love interest of Logan.
- Chandler Lovelle as Renee, a girl whom Logan cheated on Claudia with.
- Gustavo Escobar as Sal, a member of Sammy's Boy Scout troop who helps him make films.
- Nicolas Cantu as Hark, another member of Sammy's Boy Scout troop who helps him make films.
- Cooper Dodson as Turkey, another member of Sammy's Boy Scout troop who helps him make films.
- Gabriel Bateman as Roger, another member of Sammy's Boy Scout troop who appears alongside his family in his first films.
- Stephen Smith as Angelo, another member of Sammy's Boy Scout troop who helps him make films.
- James Urbaniak as the Grand View High School principal.
- Connor Trinneer as Phil Newhart
- Lane Factor as Dean, another member of Sammy's Boy Scout troop who helps him make films.
- Greg Grunberg as Bernie Fein, the co-creator of Hogan's Heroes, who offers Sammy a chance to work on the show at CBS.
- David Lynch as John Ford, the famous film director whose work influences Sammy's filmmaking.
- Jan Hoag as Nona, a secretary who works at CBS.
- Crystal the Monkey as Bennie, the Fabelmans' pet monkey.

== Production ==
=== Development ===
"Everyone sees me as a success story... But no one really knows us until we're courageous enough to tell everyone who we are."

— Steven Spielberg, 2023

In 1999, Steven Spielberg said he had been thinking of directing a film about his childhood for some time. Spielberg's sister, Anne, originally wrote the project as I'll Be Home. He explained, "My big fear is that my mom and dad won't like it and will think it's an insult and won't share my loving yet critical point of view about what it was like to grow up with them." In 2002, Spielberg said he was nervous about making I'll Be Home: "It's so close to my life and so close to my family — I prefer to make films that are more analogous. But a literal story about my family will take a lot of courage. I still think I make personal movies even if they do look like big commercial popcorn films." In November 2022, Spielberg revealed that his parents had 'nagged' him to make a film about their lives before their deaths. His mother died in 2017, and his father in August 2020.

=== Writing ===
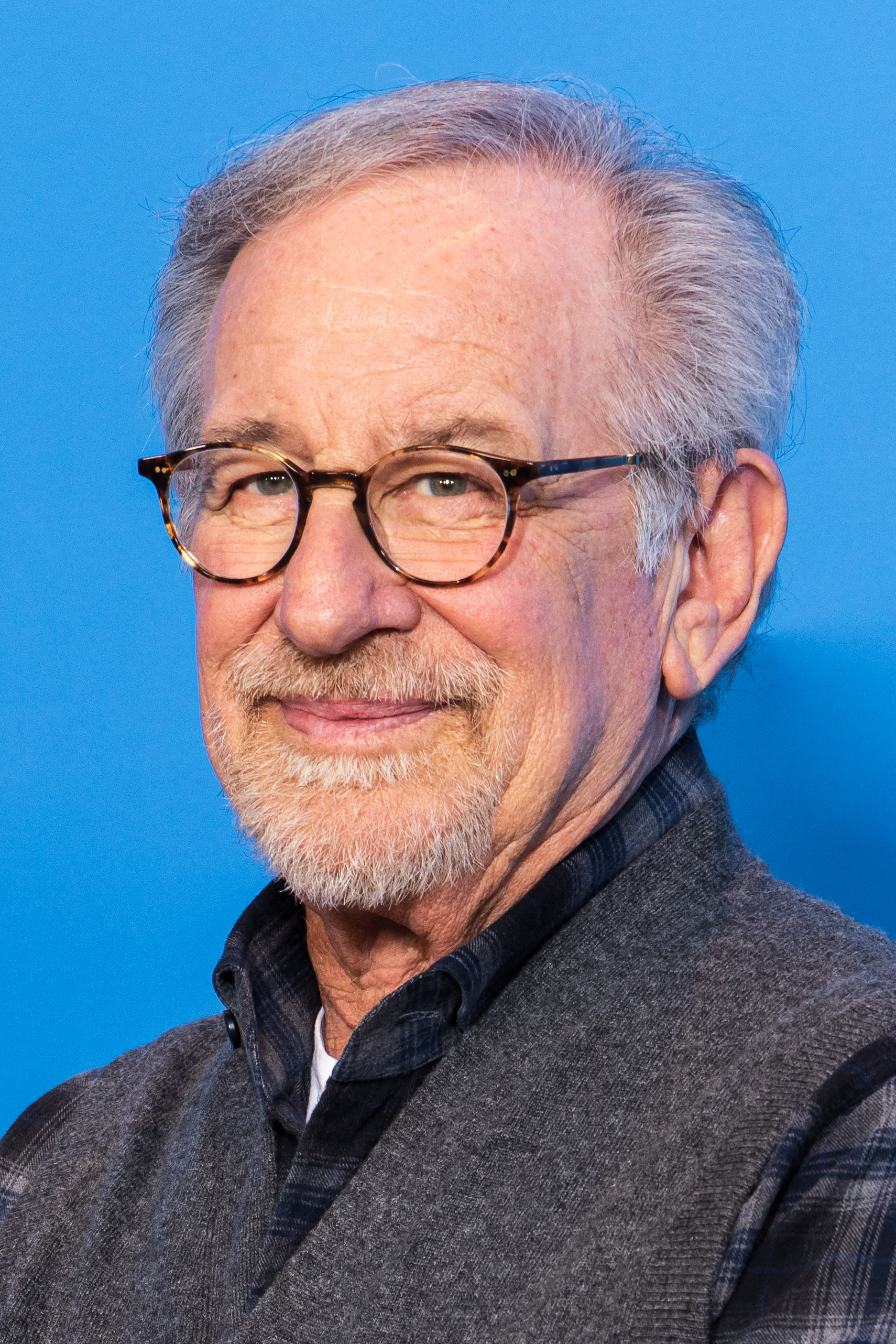
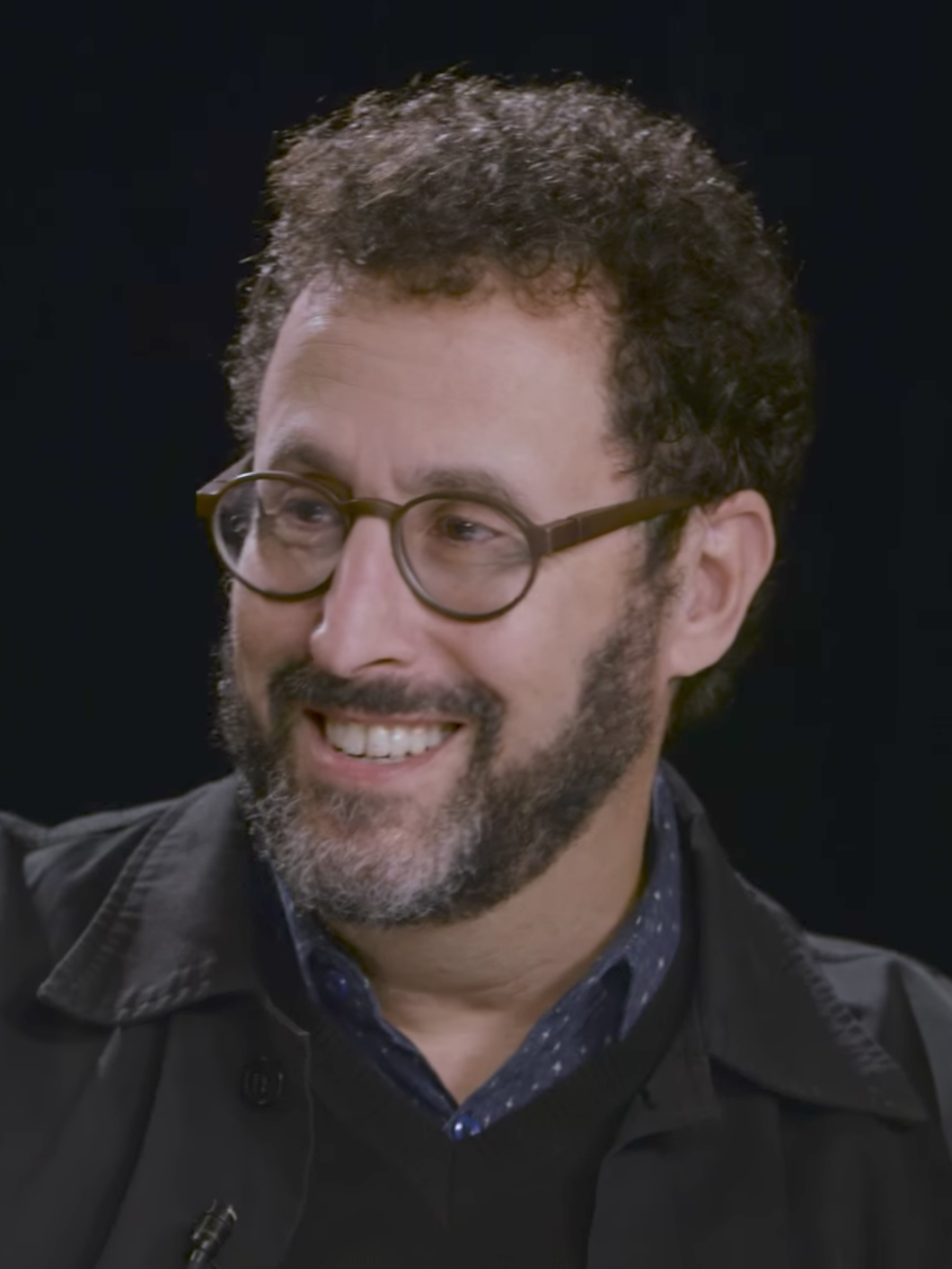
Steven Spielberg (left) directed and co-produced the film, and co-wrote the screenplay with Tony Kushner (right).

In 2004, while working on Munich, Spielberg told screenwriter Tony Kushner his life story, with Kushner telling him in response: "Someday you're going to have to make a film about this." Spielberg and Kushner developed an 80–90 page plot outline in 2019 while filming West Side Story (2021). Screenplay writing began on October 2, 2020, during the COVID-19 lockdowns, and lasted two months, finishing in December. Kushner reflected on the experience, saying, "We wrote three days a week, four hours a day, and we finished the script in two months: by leagues the fastest I've finished anything. It was a blast. I loved it." Spielberg, at that time, felt that the climate caused by the pandemic convinced him that the time was now right to make the film, saying:

I started seriously thinking, if I had to make one movie I haven't made yet, something that I really want to do on a very personally atomic level, what would that be? And there was only one story I really wanted to tell ... My life with my mom and dad taught me a lesson, which I hope this film in a small way imparts ... Which is, when does a young person in a family start to see his parents as human beings? In my case, because of what happened between the ages of 7 and 18, I started to appreciate my mom and dad not as parents but as real people.

He shared script drafts with his sisters, Sue and Nancy, to incorporate their memories and ensure accuracy. Kushner, who coined the name 'Fabelman,' explained "Spielberg means play-mountain; 'spieler' is an actor in Yiddish, and a 'spiel' can be speech or can be a play ... I wanted to have some of that meaning, and I've always liked the German word 'fabel,' which means fable. And because the movie is autobiographical for Steven but it isn't an autobiography, it's not a documentary, so there's a fictional element as well. So I thought that 'Fabelman' was a nod to that."

=== Pre-production ===
In March 2021, Spielberg was announced as director and co-screenwriter, his first writing role since A.I. Artificial Intelligence (2001). Kristie Macosko Krieger joined Spielberg and Kushner as producers. In March 2022, cinematographer Janusz Kamiński described the film as chronicling Spielberg's life from age seven to eighteen, focusing on his family, relationships, and passion for filmmaking. He called it a 'beautiful, personal movie' that reveals much about Spielberg as a filmmaker. In September 2022, Spielberg expressed how personal the film was to him, saying that "This film is, for me, a way of bringing my mom and dad back. And it also brought my sisters, Annie, Susie, and Nancy, closer to me than I ever thought possible. And that was worth making the film."

=== Casting ===
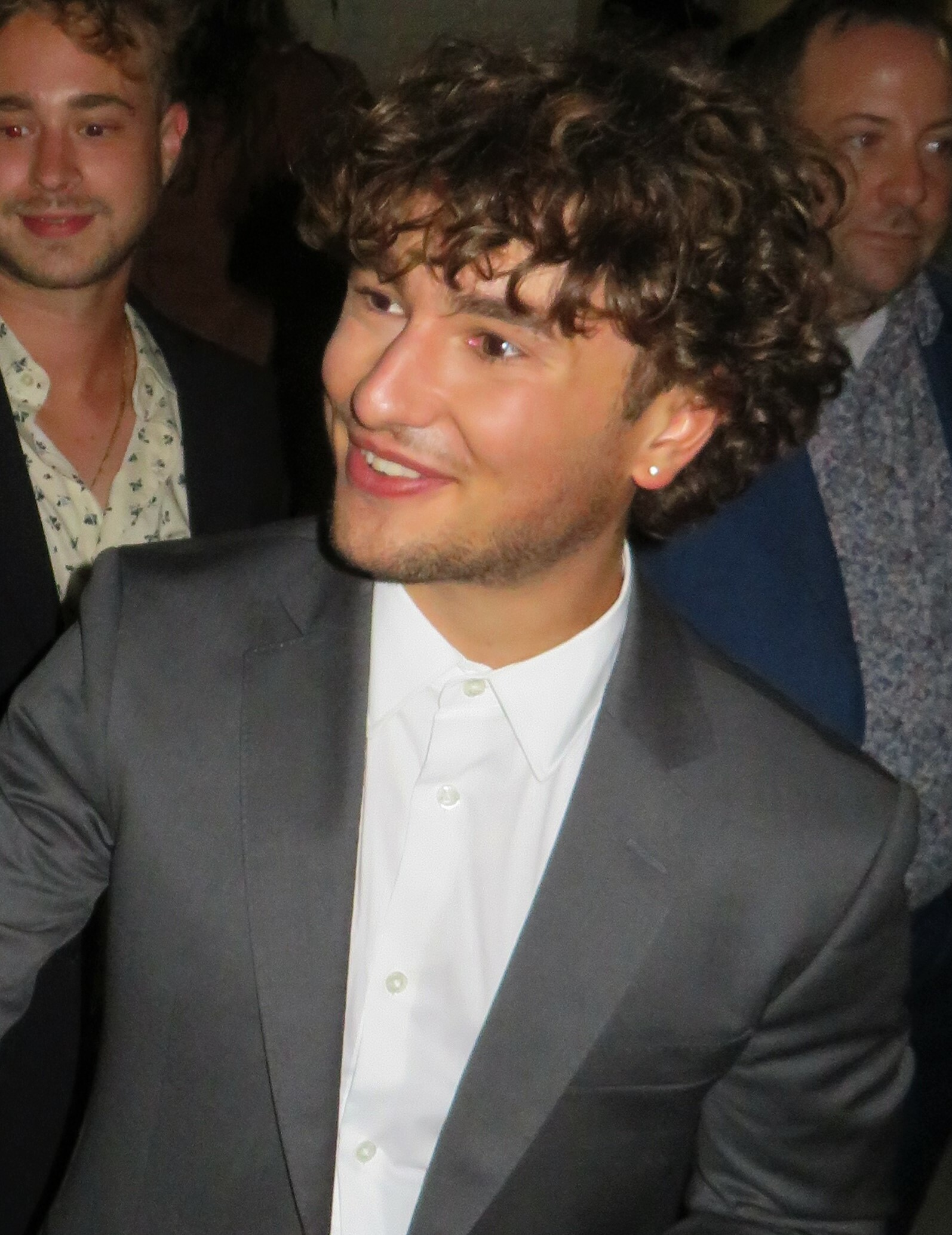
Gabriel LaBelle was cast in the lead role of Sammy Fabelman

Spielberg emphasized authenticity in casting, seeking actors who evoked a profound personal connection and reminded him of his parents. In March 2021, Michelle Williams was in negotiations to star as Mitzi Fabelman, the role inspired by Spielberg's mother (Leah Adler), but with "an original voice". Spielberg envisioned Williams in the role after seeing her in Blue Valentine (2010) and Fosse/Verdon (2019). That same month, it was reported that Seth Rogen joined the cast to play Bennie Loewy, the role inspired by Bernie Adler, "the favorite uncle of young Spielberg", while Williams was confirmed to have been cast. On April 8, 2021, Paul Dano joined the cast as Burt Fabelman, the role inspired by Spielberg's father Arnold. Dano found the role intimidating, noting that portraying one of Spielberg's most influential figures carried high stakes.

After a three-month search with over 2,000 contenders, Gabriel LaBelle entered final negotiations in May 2021 for the lead role of Sammy Fabelman. His casting was confirmed in June alongside Julia Butters as Reggie Fabelman, based on Spielberg's sister Anne. Later that June, Sam Rechner was cast as well. In July, Chloe East, Oakes Fegley, Isabelle Kusman, Jeannie Berlin, Judd Hirsch, Robin Bartlett and Jonathan Hadary were added to the cast. Hadary was cast as the spirit of Sammy's grandfather in a cut scene where Sammy claims to have seen him after his death, sparking a debate between his grandmothers. Kushner explained why it was cut, deeming it "unnecessary" and to keep the runtime under two and a half hours, while adding "This is a kind of epic story, it travels across 12, 15 years of time — and in order for it to have momentum, we couldn't afford to have it linger anywhere." In August, Gabriel Bateman, Nicolas Cantu, Gustavo Escobar, Lane Factor, Cooper Dodson and Stephen Matthew Smith were cast. They were later followed by newcomers Keeley Karsten, Birdie Borria, Alina Brace, Sophia Kopera, and Mateo Zoryan Francis-DeFord. In February 2022, it was announced David Lynch would also star in a then-undisclosed role, later revealed to be that of film director John Ford. At a November 7, 2022, Academy Award-qualifying screening, Spielberg revealed it took three weeks to convince Lynch, crediting Tony Kushner's husband, Mark Harris, for the idea and Laura Dern for persistently calling Lynch to persuade him. In response, Lynch said he would take it as long as there were bags of Cheetos on set as refreshments. He also requested that he be given his costume as Ford to wear every day for two weeks before filming his scene.

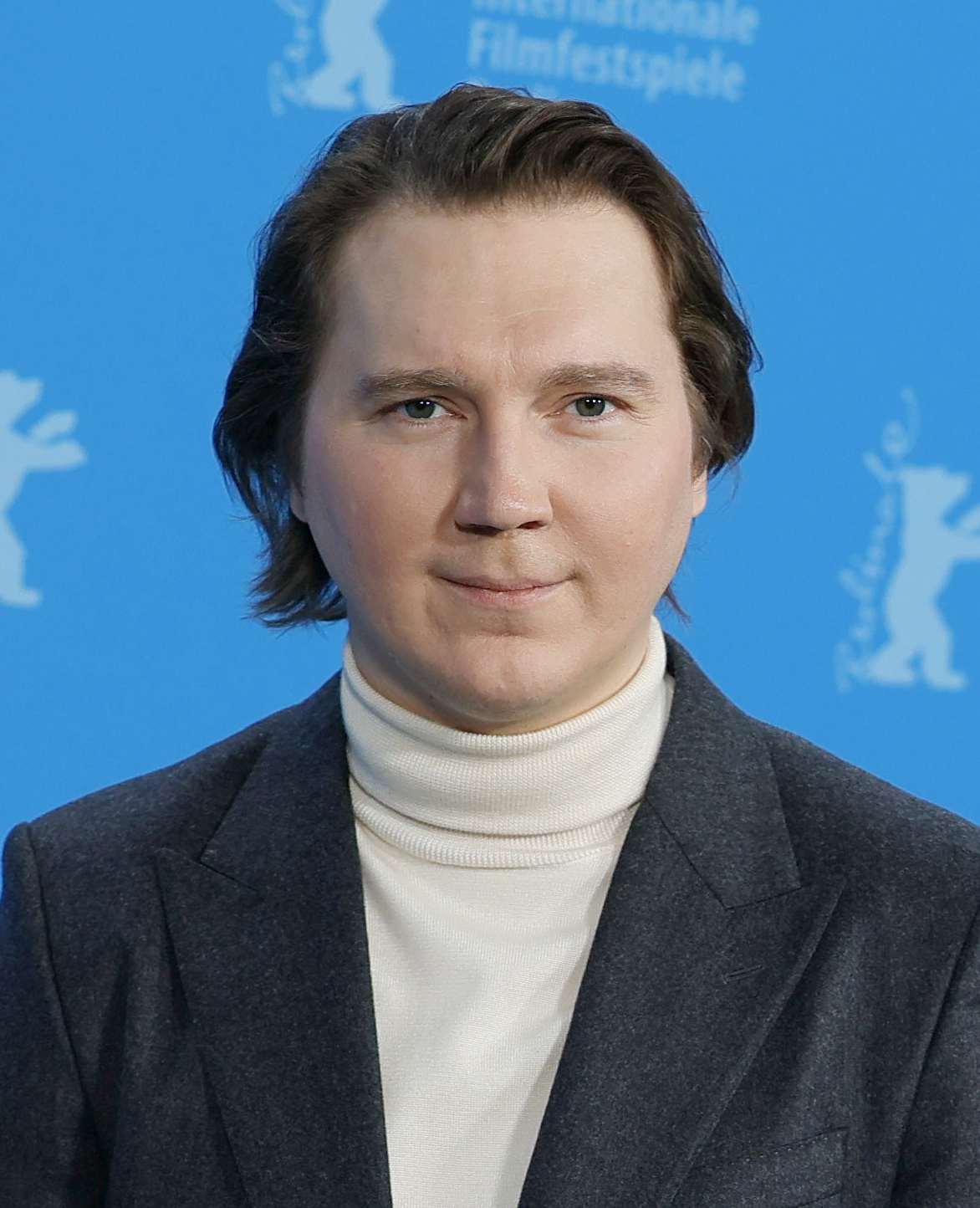
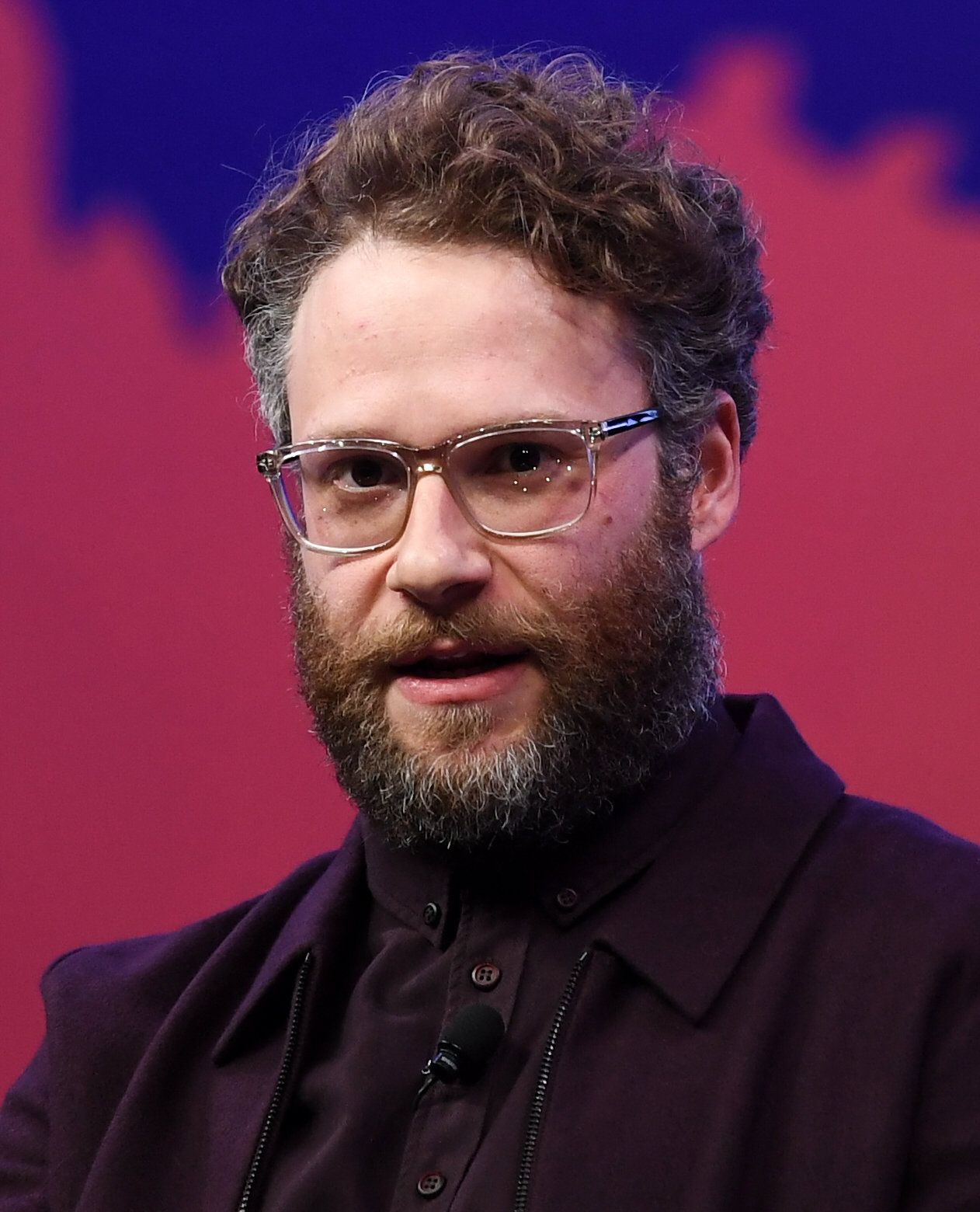
Paul Dano stars as Burt Fabelman and Seth Rogen stars as Bennie Loewy.

In September 2022, during the film's world premiere, LaBelle admitted that he initially lost the role of Sammy but secured it after a callback three months later. Upon reading the script and realizing he would portray a fictionalized Spielberg for most of the film, he recalled: "When I was auditioning, the character's name was Teenage Sammy – I thought as opposed to Adult Sammy ... I get the script and you're reading it for 30 pages and he's 6 and 8 years old. Page 35 or so Teenage Sammy comes along. OK, good! Now this is my part. It's going to be a three-act movie, it's going to be a Moonlight or something. I kept waiting for my exit but it never came." Spielberg called Sammy the hardest role to cast, explaining "As a kid growing up, I always had a lot of reasons why I was always in the corner, why I was always not the center of conversation ... I needed someone who wasn't going to bring too much self-awareness to Sammy." Casting director Cindy Tolan praised LaBelle's poignancy, noting his ability to balance pathos and humor. Spielberg added "I wasn't looking for what I see in the mirror, I was looking for a young actor who could carry a lot of story by being curious and honest and engaging and unpredictable."

According to Ben Schwartz, while promoting Sonic the Hedgehog 3 in 2024 he revealed that he was originally cast to play Bennie Loewy. However, as there was a scheduling conflict with creating Sonic the Hedgehog 2‘s voiceover that prevented his casting as Bennie Lowey, he said Rogen took over his role.

=== Filming ===
Principal photography began in the midst of the COVID-19 pandemic in Los Angeles on July 17, 2021, lasting for 59 days until ending on September 27, 2021. Additional filming took place at Zuma Beach in Malibu, California for the "Ditch Day" scenes, Susan Miller Dorsey High School for the high school scenes, and on soundstages in Santa Clarita, California.

During the shoot, the cast gained access to home movies, photographs, and recollections from Spielberg's family's past to learn what they were like and how to portray the fictionalized versions of them (the Fabelman family) on screen, while making them feel fresh and original. Paul Dano reflected, "It was overwhelming and it was sort of a heavy cloak to bear because we were with someone who was having a big experience everyday, revisiting and reworking through a part of their life ... For somebody like Steven to share that much of himself with us – with the audience too – it was really a profound experience." In addition, Dano ordered and built a crystal radio set to get the feeling of how Arnold Spielberg was around electronics. Seth Rogen described the experience as "emotional" and recalled that Spielberg was "...crying a lot on set ... As we were shooting, I'd be like, 'Did this happen in real life?' and the answer was 'yes' a hundred percent of the time." Gabriel LaBelle also rewatched some of Spielberg's films, such as Empire of the Sun (1987) and constantly had conversations with Spielberg to learn more about his life in order to prepare for playing Sammy. The jewelry that Michelle Williams wore as part of the costumes for Mitzi Fabelman were in fact some of Leah Adler's, including a charm bracelet that had pictures of all four of her children. According to an interview she did for the Hollywood Insider at the TIFF premiere, Julia Butters was gifted with Anne Spielberg's high-school ring to wear while she played Reggie Fabelman.

For the scenes of Sammy filming his own 8mm films, Spielberg decided to have the character recreate the exact ones he made during his childhood, and worked with Kamiński to ensure that they were portrayed as accurately as possible, but with improvements in the camera angles. Spielberg remarked, "It was joyful being able to recreate those films ... I shot a lot of films when I was a kid on 8mm. It was unique in those days. Not a lot of people were going out and shooting in 8mm. It was physical; it was a craft. You had to sit there with a…splicer, and then you had to scrape the emulsion off the film in order to get a seal so when you put glue on it, you literally glued the film together. And I must say, I miss it." Gabriel LaBelle's first two days on set involved a scene where Sammy and his friends film a recreation of Spielberg's World War II short film Escape to Nowhere (1961). On the experience, LaBelle remarked "It was a cool way to see how Steven walked and moved around back then ... I asked so many questions about Saving Private Ryan, because we were doing a war film. For the first two days, it was me, Steven, Tony, and Janusz, just hanging out. Mitch Dubin, the A-camera operator, stormed the beaches of Normandy with a handheld camera for Saving Private Ryan – and now he's making this movie!" The 8mm- and 16mm-camera props used in the film had real film inside them, with LaBelle being taught how to use the cameras so that what was shot with them on set could be developed for use in the film, as well as how to cut and splice film stock using the editing machines and film projectors of the period. LaBelle also got to keep the 8mm camera Sammy used to film the family camping trip and Escape to Nowhere short film as a souvenir after the completion of principal photography. To look the part of Sammy and make the character look more like Spielberg's teenage appearance, LaBelle had his hair straightened and changed the way he stood and walked, and retrained his muscles to mimic Spielberg's smile.

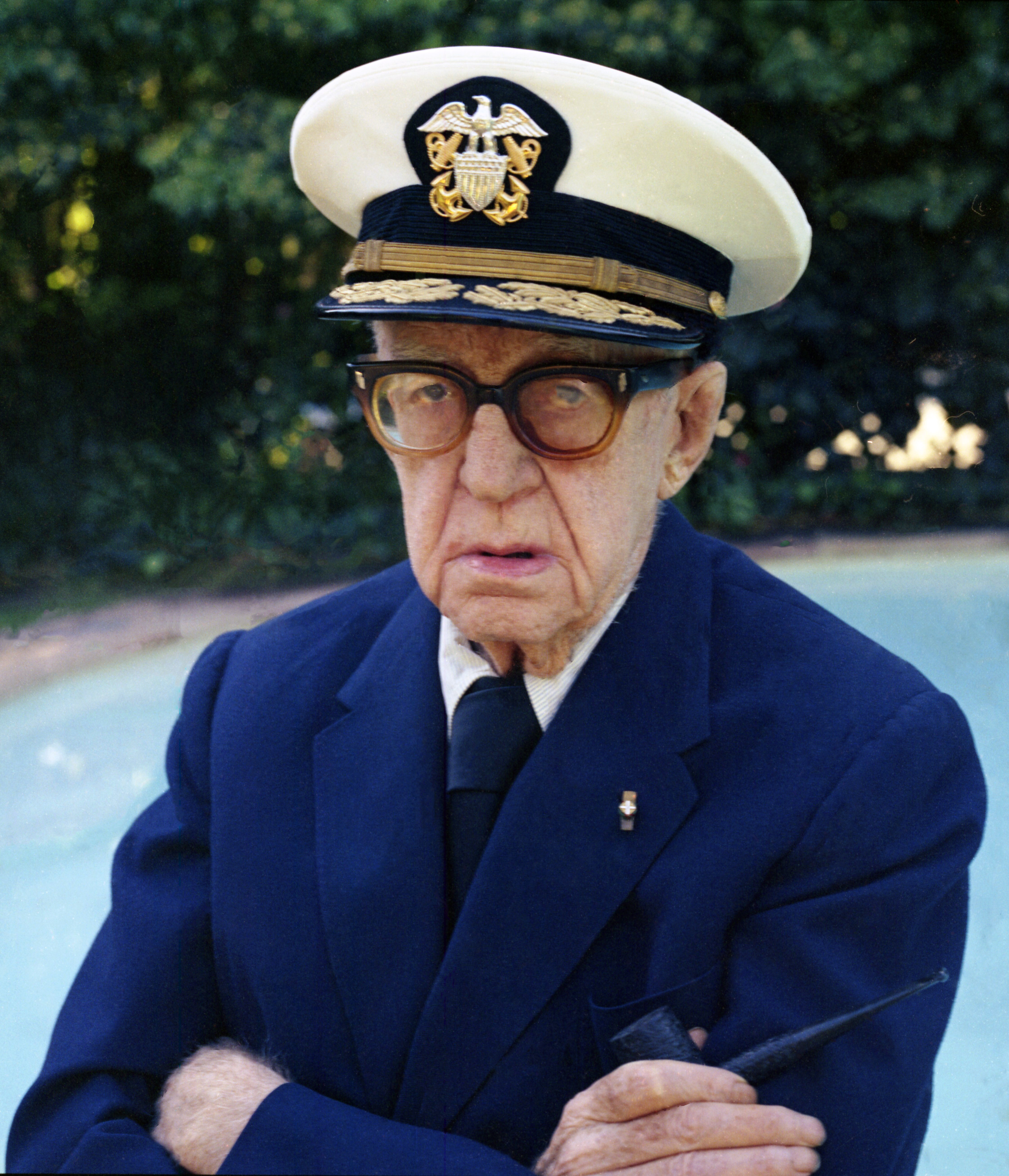
John Ford, pictured here in 1973, was played by David Lynch during the film's final scene.

LaBelle was unaware of the casting of David Lynch as John Ford until the day the scene he had to do with him was filmed. He recalled that once Lynch came onto the set, it enabled him to embody Sammy and how he was feeling, recalling, "[Lynch is] a great guy. But leading up to it, Sammy's nervous, so I'm getting nervous." The scene itself was written to historically match how the actual real-life encounter between Spielberg and Ford occurred, with the latter's dialogue written exactly word-for-word, most notably Ford's advice to Sammy about framing. The scene itself received acclaim by critics and audiences and won the award for Best Scene at the 2022 St. Louis Gateway Film Critics Association Awards. The last shot of the film, where the camera breaks the fourth wall and reframes the horizon on the image of Sammy walking on the studio lot, was already in the script prior to filming. Drew Taylor of TheWrap named it the best final shot of the year, saying that it leaves the movie on "such a happy, hopeful note" and it metaphorically represents Spielberg's "admission that he might be the most revered filmmaker in the history of the medium, but he still screws up and he's still got plenty to learn." Matthew Jacobs of The Hollywood Reporter also called the moment one of the best closing shots of Spielberg's career. The film's iconic shot of Mateo Zoryan Francis-DeFord as young Sammy projecting his first 8mm film onto his hands was not initially planned until during pre-production when "Spielberg happened to project something on his hand while they were watching old home movies." Upon witnessing this, Kaminski knew it had to be incorporated, calling it a visual "metaphor of the entire movie: [Sammy] can have the image in his hand and shape it."

Judd Hirsch's couple of days on set involved filming a major monologue that his character Uncle Boris, inspired by Spielberg's real granduncle of the same name, gives to Sammy to inspire him to continue pursuing his ambitions while also warning him of the consequences that come with it. Hirsch compared his character to "a seer from Greek mythology, a soothsayer used by the gods to communicate with mortals." On acting alongside Gabriel LaBelle for the scene, he told Vanity Fair in November 2022 that on set "When I looked at it [the script] and I met Gabriel, I said, I'm gonna destroy this boy ... My part is to tell him that horrible things are gonna happen to him—even though it has to happen. So I walked out of there and I said, Who the hell am I...some oracle? You know, an oracle comes and stands in his room and takes him apart and tells him he has to be a director." Hirsch's performance and the monologue itself were met with acclaim from critics and viewers, which resulted in a huge round of applause from the audience during the TIFF world premiere.

=== Production design ===
To recreate the three houses that Spielberg lived in during his childhood in Haddon Township, New Jersey, Phoenix, Arizona, and Saratoga, California, production designer Rick Carter worked off floor plans that the director sketched from memory and then took artistic license with the spaces to fit the emotional mindset of Sammy. More attention was paid to the set in Phoenix, "...because, as a filmmaker, he became more himself. So not only the equipment that was there is accurate, but all the storyboards that Sammy used to make his movies. And Steven drew all the storyboards, and he still draws his storyboards the way he did as a teenager." Carter and set decorator Karen O'Hara also worked off photos and memories that Spielberg and his three sisters provided. All of the house interiors were built on soundstages. Carter also noted that the differences between the two houses had to do with him and his team having "the most pictures and home movies of the Phoenix house. The New Jersey [house] we had less, but we knew the rough plan and had a couple photos that at least indicated the tone of the paint color. It's not an exact re-creation, but the Phoenix house was especially close. My attempt the whole time was to have him to be able walk in and feel like he was close to being back."

The Los Gatos rental house that the family moved to in California was entirely fictional, as the Spielberg family actually lived in various rental apartments and temporary homes. According to Carter, the house in the film "served the function of the script to have them be in this one place they were moving into while waiting for this other house to get made. He's moving to the promised land, but it doesn't turn out to be so promised in California. In the beginning, it's actually rainy and dark and gloomy, and all the kids at the school are a third bigger than he is".

For John Ford's office at the end of the film, Carter and his team used the director's 1957 film The Wings of Eagles as a direct reference, which features Ward Bond playing a character inspired by Ford. "It's a much more elaborate office than the one we did, but we still got some of the sensibility from those images," Carter said. "We were able to take that and say, 'Let's now take the elements that are important—the Western-style furniture and the Academy Awards but, more specifically, these sort of [Frederic] Remington-esque paintings.' Some of them really are Remingtons. We got the rights to them and they have literally those horizons the way they are. But to really make the point of the low horizon, we painted a picture that is actually from a still frame of The Searchers to make it very, very clear that this is low horizon, this is high horizon. Then, he can make his point about, 'Those are interesting'. What I think everybody enjoyed about that was that it was such an emotional movie up to that point, and then you have somebody who takes all that emotion and reduces it to just 'Do a good shot'. I think that there's a kind of a release. If you want [the emotion] to be dramatic, you have to make the image dramatic, and that's what Steven Spielberg has become a master at over his lifetime."

=== Visual effects ===
The film's tornado sequence was filmed using Industrial Light & Magic's StageCraft virtual production technology. Pablo Helman, who served as visual effects supervisor, suggested the idea to Spielberg and Kamiński after working with the technology on the Disney+ series The Mandalorian and Obi-Wan Kenobi and described the process as shooting "background plates with an array of cameras driving through the scene and then stitching those into a 360-degree plate we could move around wherever we wanted." The background plates were filmed digitally with a rig containing six Red Monstro 8K digital cameras with Nikon Nikkor zoom lenses and the team spent three weeks adding the tornado and other digital elements to make the scenery more "cloudy" and threatening, followed by two days of camera tests in the StageCraft Volume.

The final sequence was filmed on the LED stage at Manhattan Beach Studios, using an ARRI Alexa Mini LF camera and Panavision PVintage lenses to complement and seamlessly match the 35mm cinematography of the rest of the film. Helman revealed that Spielberg enjoyed experimenting with the new technology and that "StageCraft is a different way of working, and of course, some directors are shy of working far in advance and making commitments ... Steven has never been that way. After you finish a movie with him, two or three weeks later, you have your cut. He knows exactly what he needs for the edit and has a very specific shooting economy."

== Soundtrack ==
The Fabelmans - Main Theme
A 15-second sample of the film's main theme, composed by John Williams

The score was composed and conducted by John Williams, marking his 29th film collaboration with Spielberg and approaching the 50th anniversary of their first film The Sugarland Express, released in 1974. On June 23, 2022, Williams revealed that this and Indiana Jones and the Dial of Destiny may be the last two films he will score before retirement. Recording of the score began in March 2022, following Williams's concert performance with the Vienna Philharmonic at Vienna's Musikverein. In July, stills from the recording sessions were revealed by one of the film's crew members, revealing that scoring of the film is underway. Along with his usual orchestral style, Williams opted for a score mostly relying on piano, with Joanne Pearce Martin, principal pianist of the Los Angeles Philharmonic, providing the piano solos.

The film features source classical music selected by Spielberg himself, some of which are performed on piano in the film by the character of Mitzi Fabelman, from composers such as Friedrich Kuhlau, Erik Satie, Muzio Clementi, Johann Sebastian Bach and Joseph Haydn. The film's soundtrack was released digitally by Sony Classical on November 11, 2022, and was released on physical CD on December 9, 2022.

The film includes pop songs of the film's time period which are not featured on the soundtrack album, such as "Goodbye Cruel World" by James Darren, used to accompany the montage sequence of Sammy Fabelman documenting his high school's Ditch Day on film. Scott Joplin's "Elite Syncopations" (1902) also appears twice in the film. Music sampled from Elmer Bernstein's score to The Magnificent Seven (1960) and Alfred Newman's score to How the West Was Won (1962) respectively underscore the screenings of Gunsmog and Escape to Nowhere when Sammy plays them for his family and friends at the Boy Scout assemblies.

== Themes and interpretations ==
The film has been characterized as focusing on the interrelationship and coexistence of family and passion, as well as the themes of trauma, control, the consequences of inaction and the importance of empathy and compassion. Yoni Mayer of Yeshiva University's The Commentator noted the film's three-minute sequence of Sammy editing the footage of the camping trip and uncovering Mitzi's affair with Bennie, while Burt sits on the couch in the living room and listens to Mitzi play Bach's Concerto in D Minor, BWV 974: II. Adagio on her piano, as representative of the tension between "family" and "art," using the scene's cinematography, intercut editing and music to present that aspect visually without a single line of dialogue.

Sarah Buddery of Little White Lies noted how the film ties in with the theme of technology and music in a similar way as Spielberg's Close Encounters of the Third Kind (1977), relating that although Mitzi and Burt separate in part due to their differences, Close Encounters saw those elements work together in "beautiful, communicative harmony". Ronald Meyer of Collider added on the subject of how Mitzi and Burt see things differently by referencing the opening scene where they and younger Sammy are in line to see The Greatest Show on Earth and they explain to him the "majesty of cinema". Burt's teaching to Sammy is more technical and explains to him the "persistence of vision", while Mitzi re-frames it more on the artistic side. This type of side to the character was implied by Spielberg in the 2017 HBO documentary Spielberg, where he likens her real-life counterpart Leah Adler to Peter Pan, saying "She was a sibling, not a parent."

The scene where Sammy, while watching Mitzi and Burt announce their divorce to the family, sees a vision of himself filming this moment with his 8mm camera in the mirror over the mantelpiece, has been widely analyzed. Serena Irani of The Michigan Daily and David Sims of The Atlantic interpreted Sammy's emotional reaction in this scene as "transfixed as he is horrified by the notion, and perhaps the inevitable knowledge that he will one day make this film," relating it to how the divorce of Spielberg's parents in real life had a large impact on his work. Kayla Laguerre-Lewis of Screen Rant called the scene the one that drives home why Spielberg's films connect personally to his past, specifically his parents' divorce, comparing it to how the theme was handled in E.T. the Extra-Terrestrial (1982). It was also noted how the divorce, both in real life and in this film, may have also reflected Spielberg's being drawn to make Catch Me If You Can (2002) due to similarities between Sammy's use of filmmaking to escape the problems in his family and con artist Frank Abagnale's use of his actions to escape his own reality as a result of his own parents' break-up. In a similar vein, Timothy Laurie in Australian Feminist Studies notes that Sammy belongs to a series of Spielbergian children "unsettled by family life or wider social upheavals," and that "despite variations in the moods and contexts attached to these boys, they share the capacity to see what others cannot."

== Release ==
The Fabelmans had its world premiere at the Princess of Wales Theatre during the Toronto International Film Festival on September 10, 2022, where it received two standing ovations from the audience, one before the film when Spielberg took the stage to introduce it, and a longer one preceding the post-film Q&A. The crowd was also reported to have been loudly chanting Spielberg's name while outside waiting to get into the theater during the red carpet arrivals. On the announcement of the premiere, TIFF CEO Cameron Bailey remarked: "It's different from a typical Spielberg blockbuster, but it is just as easily impactful in terms of the emotional effect it's going to have on people. If you love movies, this is going to be a very powerful film for you to watch. I'm excited that it's launching in an environment that celebrates cinema." Upon winning the festival's People's Choice Award, Spielberg remarked "I'm glad I brought this film to Toronto! This is the most personal film I've ever made, and the warm reception from everyone in Toronto made my first visit to TIFF so intimate and personal for me and my entire Fabelman family ... a very special thank you to all the movie fans in Toronto who have made this past weekend one I'll never forget." For his performance, Gabriel LaBelle was also named a 2022 TIFF Rising Star.

It held its European premiere at the Rome Film Festival on October 19, 2022, which was followed by its United States premiere at the TCL Chinese Theatre in Los Angeles on November 6, 2022, as the closing night film of the 2022 AFI Fest. It also closed the Miami International Film Festival on November 10, 2022, with Paul Dano virtually receiving the festival's Precious Gem Award. The French premiere took place at the Lumière Film Festival on October 18, 2022. It also screened as the opening night film of the 20th Morelia International Film Festival on October 23, 2022, the 63rd Thessaloniki International Film Festival on November 3, 2022, and the 44th Cairo International Film Festival on November 13, 2022. It also opened the 15th edition of "The Contenders" film series at the Museum of Modern Art in New York City on November 10, 2022, followed by a conversation with the cast. The film's United Kingdom premiere took place on January 18, 2023, at The Curzon Mayfair in London, with Spielberg, LaBelle and Krieger in attendance.

It held its German premiere at the 73rd Berlin International Film Festival on February 21, 2023, as part of the Homage section (where Spielberg's other films Bridge of Spies (2015), Duel (1971), E.T. the Extra-Terrestrial (1982), Jaws (1975), Munich (2005), Raiders of the Lost Ark (1981) and Schindler's List (1993) were also screened) and at the awards ceremony, where Spielberg received an honorary Golden Bear for lifetime achievement. On the announcement, festival directors Mariette Rissenbeek and Carlo Chatrian remarked: "With an incredible career, Steven Spielberg has not only enchanted generations of viewers all over the world, but has also given a new meaning to the 'cinema' as the factory of dreams ... If Berlinale 2023 represents a new beginning we couldn't find a better start than the one offered by Spielberg's great work."

=== Theatrical ===
The Fabelmans was released by Universal Pictures in select theaters in Los Angeles and New York City on November 11, 2022, with a nationwide release on November 23 in the United States. It became Spielberg's first film to be distributed by Universal since Munich (2005). Universal also distributed the film in some international territories, but as part of Amblin Partners' deal with Mister Smith Entertainment, there are some exceptions, as the film has been sold to Entertainment One for the United Kingdom, StudioCanal for Australia, WW Entertainment for Benelux, Leone Film Group for Italy, Reliance Distribution for India and Nordisk Film for Scandinavia.

=== Home media ===
The Fabelmans was released on video on demand (VOD) on December 13, 2022, and on digital January 17, 2023. It was released on DVD, Blu-ray and Ultra HD Blu-ray on February 14, 2023, by Universal Pictures Home Entertainment, and grossed $1,901,635 in video sales, debuting in second place on the home media charts behind Black Panther: Wakanda Forever.

On VOD, it ranked #1 on iTunes Movies following the Oscar nomination announcements on January 24, 2023. By March 9, 2023, according to Samba TV, it had been watched on VOD in 360,000 households in the United States since the announcements, over-indexing by the highest margin of any film in the Los Angeles DMA by 60%. By February 21, according to JustWatch, it topped the Canadian streaming charts following the announcements, ahead of Triangle of Sadness and Tár. After failing to win any Oscars at the 95th Academy Awards ceremony, its streaming viewership increased, allowing it to remain in the top 10 of the Digital Entertainment Group's Watched at Home Top 20 Chart for two weeks following the ceremony.

=== Marketing ===
The poster to promote the film's world premiere at TIFF was released on September 7, 2022, with the official theatrical release version of it being released on September 29, 2022. The trailer premiered online on September 11, 2022. The music for the trailer was composed by Felix Erskine of Cavalry Music. Universal spent approximately $8.5 million on the film's advertising campaign. Another trailer, set to Ben Folds' cover of The Beatles song "Golden Slumbers", was released on December 13, 2022.

== Reception ==
=== Box office ===
The Fabelmans grossed $17.3 million in the United States and Canada, and $28.3 million in other territories, for a worldwide gross of $45.6 million.

In the United States, the film made $161,579 from four theaters in its opening weekend for an average of $40,395 per-screen, the third highest average for a Fall 2022 platform release, behind Till and The Banshees of Inisherin. The film expanded alongside Glass Onion: A Knives Out Mystery, Strange World, Devotion, and the wide expansion of Bones and All, and was projected to gross around $3–5 million from 638 theaters over the five-day weekend. Variety called the projections "a disappointing result for a $40 million movie, especially one that hails from the most successful director of his time" and compared the situation to the poor $38 million domestic box office returns of Spielberg's West Side Story the year before. It made $400,000 on its first day of wide release, with an additional $480,000 on Thanksgiving Day and $880,000 on Black Friday, resulting in a 5-day weekend total of $3.4 million. After four weeks in theaters, Spielberg's film grossed $6 million domestic, making it the smallest ever gross for a Spielberg film. This was attributed to the general public's trending lack of interest in prestige films, a muted reception from older audience demographics and the large decline in popularity and relevance of Spielberg and his filmography. The film crossed the $10 million mark worldwide during Christmas weekend. Following the Academy Award nomination announcements, the film earned a 14% boost in grosses. It performed better in the United Kingdom, grossing $1.3 million on its opening weekend, finishing fourth. It was also a success in France, grossing $2.2 million on its opening weekend, also finishing fourth.

=== Critical response ===
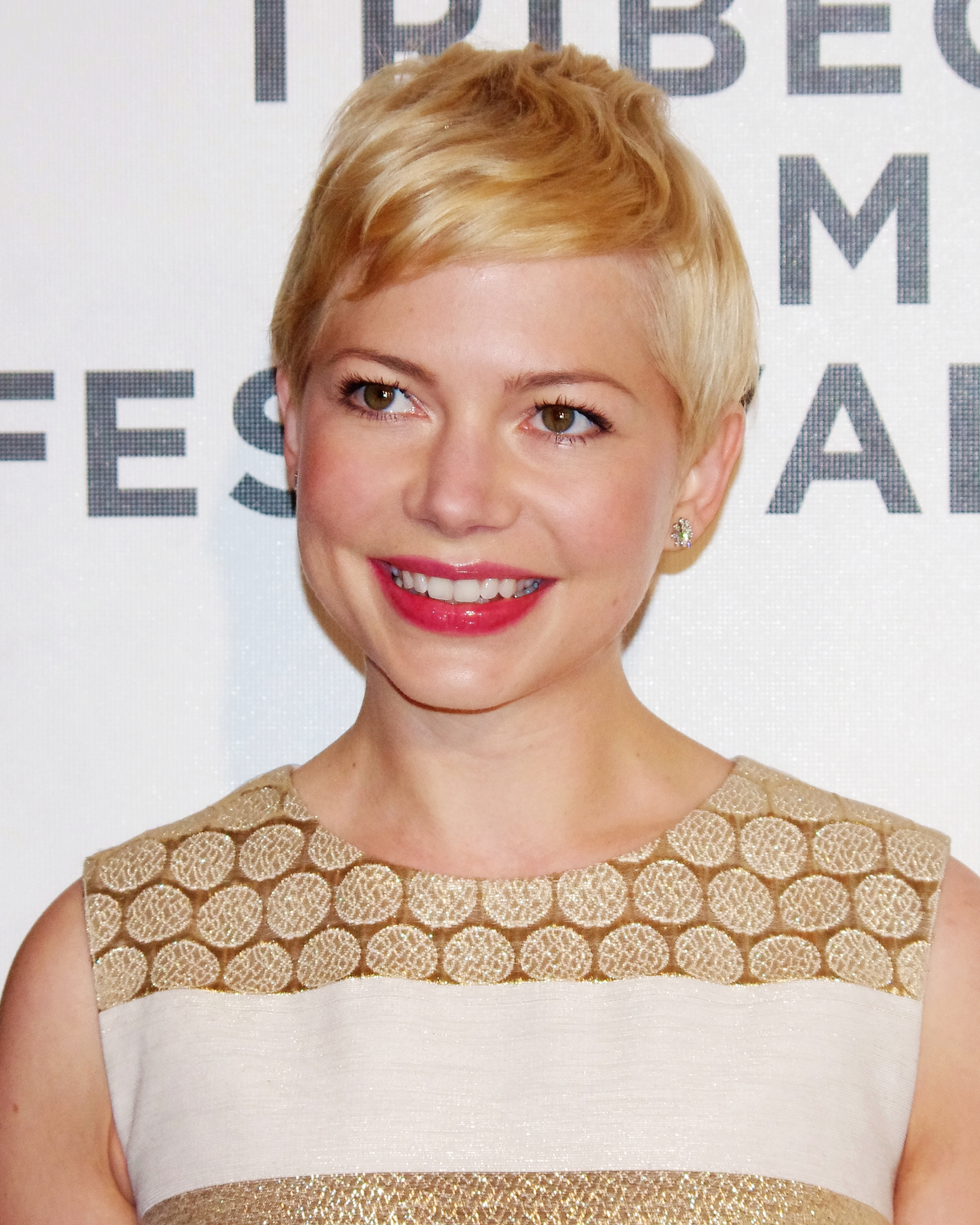
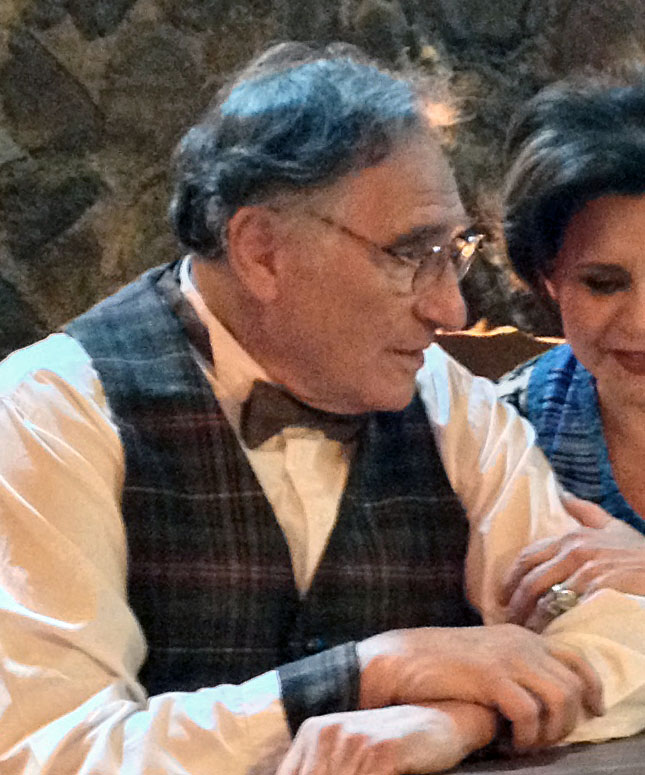
Michelle Williams and Judd Hirsch garnered critical acclaim for their performances as Mitzi Fabelman and Boris Podgorny, and earned Academy Award nominations for Best Actress and Best Supporting Actor.

On the review aggregator website Rotten Tomatoes, 92% of 396 critics' reviews are positive, with an average rating of 8.2/10. The website's consensus reads: "Part memoir, part ode to the power of the movies, The Fabelmans finds Steven Spielberg digging at the family roots that helped make him a beloved filmmaker — and proves he hasn't lost his magic touch." Metacritic, which uses a weighted average, assigned the film a score of 85 out of 100, based on 65 critics, indicating "universal acclaim". Audiences polled by CinemaScore gave the film an average grade of "A" on an A+ to F scale.

Chris Evangelista of /Film called it " ... one of Spielberg's warmest, funniest films" and highlighted Kamiński's cinematography. Steve Pond of TheWrap wrote, "That The Fabelmans is one of Steven Spielberg's most personal movies was never in doubt; that it's also one of his most original and most satisfying in years is a welcome bonus." Pete Hammond of Deadline Hollywood praised the performances of Williams, Dano, LaBelle and Butters, and referred to David Lynch's cameo as being "worth the price of admission alone".

Ross Bonaime of Collider wrote "For decades, Spielberg has shown us ourselves through the magic of his movies, and with The Fabelmans, he finally shows us who he is, the good and the bad, and pain and the joys, the magic and the mayhem." Peter Debruge of Variety named it the frontrunner for the Academy Award for Best Picture, while writing "...this endearing, broadly appealing account of how Spielberg was smitten by the medium – and why the prodigy nearly abandoned picture-making before his career even started – holds the keys to so much of the master's filmography."

David Ehrlich of IndieWire was mixed about the film and gave it a B+, writing that Spielberg " ... may not have been able to fix his parents' marriage, but for more than half a century his films have been reconciling the family that Arthur and Leah Spielberg made possible." Brian Tallerico of RogerEbert.com praised the screenplay, calling it "...a graceful gem, moving through different chapters of the life of this relatively average family that would just happen to produce an unaverage filmmaker." Benjamin Lee of The Guardian was mixed, saying that "There remains a remove though still, Spielberg giving us a slightly too stage-managed version of himself and his family, some gristle missing from the darkest moments." Tomris Laffly of The Playlist wrote "It's Spielberg's most personal film, one that gorgeously revives the memories of his childhood and youth with a lavish sense of wistfulness and an aptly Hollywood-ized, fable-like touch."

John DeFore of The Hollywood Reporter called it "...a vivid capturing of the auteur's earliest flashes of filmmaking insight and a portrait, full of love yet unclouded by nostalgia, of the family that made him." Justin Chang of Los Angeles Times called it "A uniquely confessional work, in which a great artist freely and happily acknowledges the manipulation inherent in the art form he was born to master." Leah Greenblatt of Entertainment Weekly wrote that "If it all feels a little sanitized and idealized, it's also consistently lovely – and after 75 years and 34 films, who more than Spielberg has earned the right to revisit his stardust memories?" Richard Lawson of Vanity Fair wrote that "... because there's always been a curious blankness to Spielberg's public persona – cheerful and engaged but never quite known – The Fabelmans does feel like something of a gift."

David Fear of Rolling Stone wrote that "If the movie does adhere to [Steven Spielberg's] signature beats, and feature so many recognizable Spielbergisms, occasionally to its detriment, it's still one of the most impressive, enlightening, vital things he's ever done." Peter Travers of ABC News was positively overwhelmed by the film, saying "Bring out the Oscars for 'The Fabelmans,' a personal best from Steven Spielberg in no small part because it's a family picture about Spielberg's own family." Anthony Lane of The New Yorker praised the film, saying "Here is a film that is touched with the madness of love."

Anna Swanson of Film School Rejects praised the film, saying "By laying bare indiscretions and frustrations, Spielberg is ostensibly airing out the dirty laundry and then treating it with the empathy that can only come from an adult perspective on childhood memories." Kyle Buchanan of The New York Times praised Michelle Williams' performance, and in a later review for the paper, Manohla Dargis named the film a New York Times Critic's Pick, calling it "...somewhat of a fable and wonderful in both large and small ways, even if Spielberg can't help but soften the rougher, potentially lacerating edges."

Alison Willmore of Vulture wrote that "Spielberg, an incredibly precise filmmaker, never seems certain as to what a movie about his life, or about that of a slightly outsize proxy, should look like, and that uncertainty is actually the warmest and most vulnerable quality The Fabelmans has." Todd Gilchrist of The A.V. Club called it "A measured and incredibly intimate look at Spielberg's upbringing as he developed his aptitude for storytelling through a medium that mesmerized him." David Sims of The Atlantic singled out LaBelle, Williams and Dano's performances and praised Spielberg's use of storytelling. Joyce Carol Oates, the author of the Marilyn Monroe biography Blonde, which was adapted into a film in 2022, slammed the film as "remarkably mediocre" and that it "discourages young filmmakers", criticizing every element of the plot, performances and screenplay, but did, however, praise the scene with David Lynch; her comments received online backlash.

Stephanie Zacharek of Time ranked the film as the best movie of 2022, and praises Williams and Dano's performances as part of Time's Top 10 movie performances of 2022. Due to the film being released in the United Kingdom a year after its premiere, Time Out and Empire both ranked the film at number 16 on their respective lists of "The best movies of 2023". The film appeared twice on Sight and Sound's annual polls for the "50 best films of the year", ranking number 20 on its 2022 list and number 26 (in a five-way tie with The Beast, Beau Is Afraid, The Delinquents and Rotting in the Sun) on its 2023 list.

Adam Nayman of The Ringer named the frame of younger Sammy Fabelman (Mateo Zoryan Francis-DeFord) "projecting his own painstakingly captured Super 8 footage onto his outstretched palms" in the dark as one of the best shots of 2022. Christian Zilko of IndieWire called the moment one of the most "dazzling" shots from the 2023 Academy Award contenders, saying that it perfectly "captures the way the character [Sammy] saw filmmaking as a way to look for control in a chaotic world." Pete Volk of Polygon and Marshall Shaffer of Slant Magazine named the "hallway scene" where Logan Hall confronts Sammy Fabelman over the way the latter portrayed him in the "Ditch Day" film and the two of them ultimately coming to an understanding, as one of the best movie scenes of 2022. The scene itself would also go viral on social media during the first week of the film's VOD release in December 2022, with users praising LaBelle's line delivery and resulting in the character of Sammy becoming popular through fancams uploaded to Twitter and TikTok. The film has also appeared on a number of critics' lists of the best films of 2022, ranking first place on several.

Upon the film's release in France, it received an average score of 4.9 out of 5 from critics on AlloCiné from 43 reviews, with all but 6 giving the film 5 stars, making it become the highest-rated film of the 21st century in the country. Cahiers du Cinéma wrote that Spielberg, at age 76, had "come to represent like no other, the idea of cinema as wonder, at a time when the relationship to the spectacular and the cinema seems more tormented than ever" and declared that the film will "undoubtedly remain the most important and singular film of his career." The film would then ultimately rank number 4 on the magazine's list of the Top 10 Films of 2023, making it Spielberg's fourth film to make the annual listing following War of the Worlds (2005), Lincoln (2012) and The Post (2017).

== Legacy ==
Filmmaker Denis Villeneuve praised the film, calling it "...the best movie ever made about the power of cinema. It's a miracle. To say that I was deeply moved by this movie is an understatement. The Fabelmans is a pure act of artistic generosity made by one of the greatest filmmakers of our time." Other filmmakers, including S. S. Rajamouli, Guillermo del Toro, Judd Apatow, and Arnaud Desplechin, as well as actor Tom Cruise, also praised the film. (Note: Attributed to multiple references:) Apatow, in particular, felt seen by the film and its portrayal of growing up in an ever-changing world and how it affects life itself, saying "As a child of divorce, I felt a deep connection to this story about a family struggling to hold together, how the traumas of a disintegrating marriage affect a young man and how it leads to him developing his creative muscles as a way to process his pain and interpret the world ...It's a terrifying endeavor to open up oneself and your family — to share the most personal details that shaped you. Personally, I related to so much of it, especially that feeling you have as a child when you realize your parents are not perfect and you need to learn how to survive in the world without them." Desplechin cited the film as an influence on his docufiction drama film Filmlovers! (2024).

In 2023, Collider ranked the film as the "Best Drama Movie of the 2020s, So Far", writing that Spielberg put "into beautiful words and images the issues that he's been struggling with for his entire life; he's desperately trying to piece together a broken family while pursuing his addiction to telling stories." It also topped the site's list of the "10 Best Coming-of-Age Movies of the 2020s", ranked number 2 its list of the "10 Great Coming-of-Age Movies of the Last 5 Years," number 5 on its list of the "10 Best Drama Movies of the Last 25 Years," number 8 on its list of the "10 Best Period Coming-of-Age Movies & TV Shows," number 15 on its list of the "25 Best Coming-of-Age Movies of All Time" and number 20 on its list of the "35 Best Movies of the 2020s, So Far", writing that "Despite the movie having a few slow-moving parts, its masterfully made direction could at times seem like a fable." In March 2023, ScreenCrush ranked it number 3 on its list of the "10 Best Movies Based on the Director's Own Life" and in May 2025 ranked it number 17 on its list of "The 20 Best Movies of the Last 20 Years." In September 2023, MovieWeb ranked the film at number 7 on its list of the "Best Modern Movies Shot on Film", writing that the decision to shoot the film on "Kodak 35mm, 16mm, and 8mm to display the various aspects of the evolution of filmmaking within the film" makes it "an emotional and technical triumph and shows that Spielberg is still one of the best." John Ford's advice to Sammy about framing the horizon was also ranked at number 3 by IndieWire on its list of the "22 Best Movie Quotes of 2022."

The A.V. Club included the character of Mitzi Fabelman on its list of the "15 Best movie moms of all time", with Cindy White writing "She's not a perfect person, but the movie asks us to understand and forgive her (as, we assume, Spielberg forgave his mother) for wanting a fuller, more creative life than her scientifically minded husband could give her. Thanks to [Michelle] Williams' delicate performance, it's not hard to do." In 2024, Screen Rant ranked it number 8 on its list of the "10 Best Movies About Filmmaking", with Abigail Stevens writing that it "...gives a unique insight into the innovations of a young filmmaker – as well as how his [Sammy's] father considers his passion a "hobby" – alongside an honest story about family. However, while it is a good movie, it is hard not to compare it to the influence and spectacle of the rest of Spielberg's repertoire." Looper ranked it number 22 on its list of the "50 Best PG-13 Movies of All Time", writing that the film "strikes a delicate balance between nostalgia and reflection, avoiding the pitfalls of self-indulgence or sentimentality. It's a testament to Spielberg's craftsmanship, created by a true cinephile for fellow enthusiasts. Beyond its narrative of family dynamics, the film radiates a profound reverence for the art of cinema, reminding audiences of the medium's transformative power. The Fabelmans is more than just a movie, it's a love letter to filmmaking itself." In 2025, radio station KKCB ranked the film at number 9 on its list of "The 10 Best Movies of the Last 10 Years," with Matt Singer calling it an "incredible story, which is so full of life and love and joy and sadness. As all great movies are." In June 2025, IndieWire ranked the film at number 52 on its list of "The 100 Best Movies of the 2020s (So Far)." In July 2025, it was one of the films voted for the "Readers' Choice" edition of The New York Times' list of "The 100 Best Movies of the 21st Century," finishing at number 262.

== Accolades ==
The Fabelmans received seven nominations at the 95th Academy Awards, including Best Picture, but failed to win any due to it receiving a divided reception by the academy and strong competition from Everything Everywhere All at Once, which won the award. It also received five nominations at the 80th Golden Globe Awards, winning Best Motion Picture – Drama and Best Director for Spielberg, and received 11 nominations at the 28th Critics' Choice Awards, including Best Picture, winning Best Young Performer for LaBelle, and two nominations at the 29th Screen Actors Guild Awards including Best Ensemble Cast of a Motion Picture and Best Supporting Actor (for Dano).

The Fabelmans also received two awards from the National Board of Review, including Best Director for Spielberg and Breakthrough Performance for LaBelle (shared with Danielle Deadwyler for Till), making this the second Spielberg film to win both of these awards together since 1987's Empire of the Sun. With his 53rd nomination for Best Original Score with this film, John Williams broke his own record as the most Oscar-nominated person alive at the age of 90. Williams also received a nomination for Best Score Soundtrack for Visual Media at the 66th Annual Grammy Awards for his work on the score, but lost to Ludwig Göransson for his score on Oppenheimer (2023).

== Possible sequel ==
When asked about whether he would consider making a sequel to the film, Spielberg told W Magazine in February 2023: "I never say never, but I don't know what to do next. I was so emotionally invested in The Fabelmans, I left a vast body of water between myself and the next project. I didn't plan ahead at all. I haven't found my passion. And I can't work without passion. I won't." During a virtual conversation with S. S. Rajamouli, Spielberg said that he will not rule out the possibility of a sequel, but confirmed that there are currently no immediate plans.

== See also ==
- Spielberg, a 2017 HBO documentary film about Spielberg's life, most of which inspired the plot for this film.
- List of films featuring fictional films
