= Kristie Macosko Krieger =

American film producer

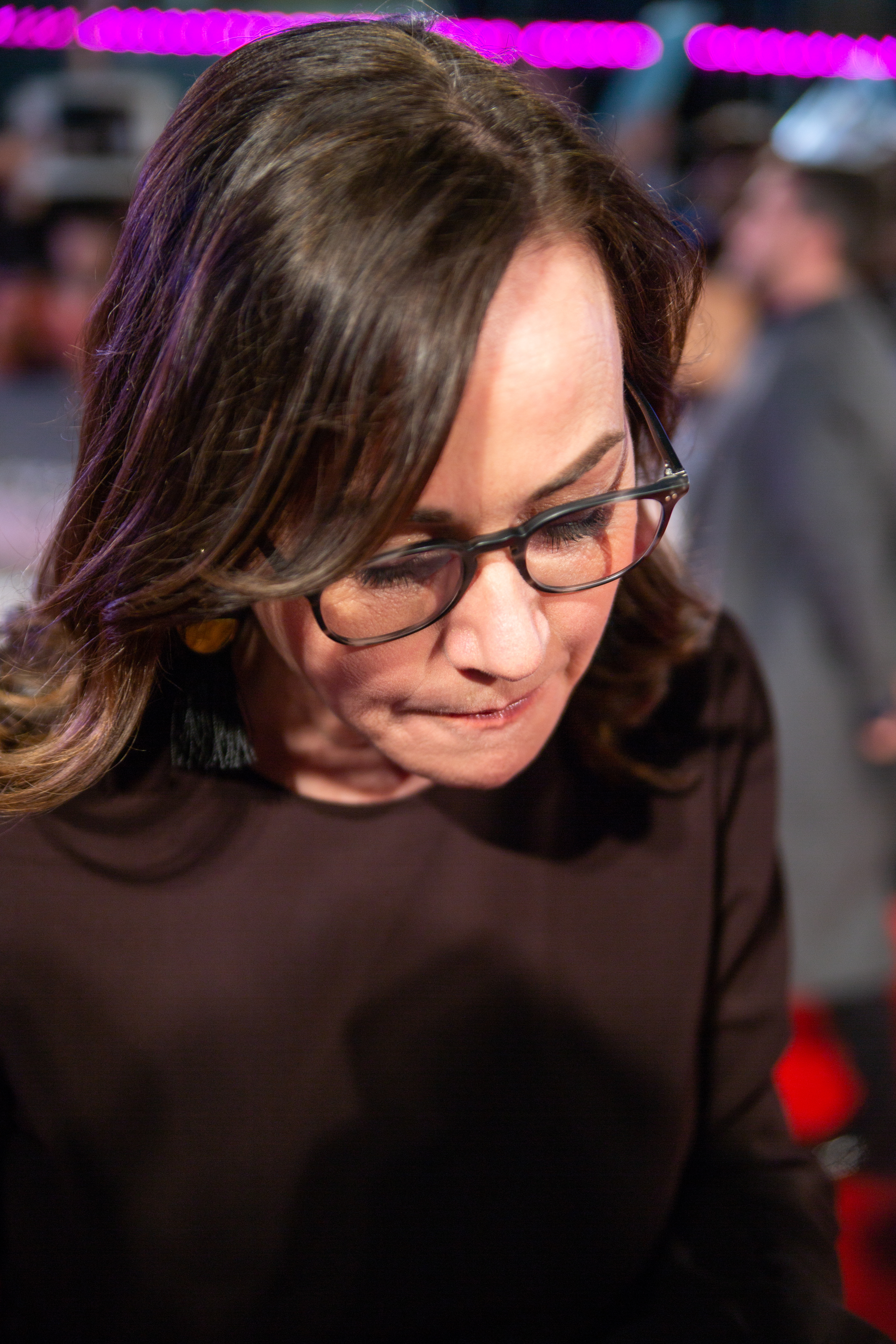
- Krieger at the Japan premiere of Ready Player One in 2018
- Born: 1970 (age 55–56); U.S.
- Other name: Kristie Macosko
- Occupation: Film producer
- Years active: 1998–present

Kristie Macosko Krieger (born in 1970) is an American film producer, best known for her work alongside director Steven Spielberg. She worked as his assistant (or "associate") starting with the 1998 documentary film The Last Days, and then on his own films from 2001's A.I. Artificial Intelligence to 2011's The Adventures of Tintin. She also became producer on Spielberg's films starting with 2008's Indiana Jones and the Kingdom of the Crystal Skull. For 2015's Bridge of Spies, 2017's The Post, 2021's West Side Story, and 2022's The Fabelmans, she received Academy Award nominations for Best Picture.

== Filmography ==
She was a producer in all films unless otherwise noted.

=== Film ===
Year	Film	Credit	Notes
2008	Indiana Jones and the Kingdom of the Crystal Skull	Associate producer	
2011	War Horse	Associate producer	
2012	Lincoln	Co-producer	
2015	Bridge of Spies	Producer	
2016	The BFG	Executive producer	
2017	The Post		
2018	Ready Player One		
2020	The Trial of the Chicago 7	Executive producer	
2021	Oslo	Executive producer	Television film
2021	West Side Story		
2022	The Fabelmans		
2023	The Color Purple	Executive producer	
2023	Maestro		
2025	Hamnet	Executive producer	
2026	Disclosure Day	co-produced with Steven Spielberg	

Miscellaneous crew

Year	Film	Role	Notes
2001	A.I. Artificial Intelligence	Assistant: Steven Spielberg	
2002	Minority Report	Assistant: Steven Spielberg	
2002	Catch Me If You Can	Associate: Steven Spielberg	
2004	The Terminal	Associate: Steven Spielberg	
2005	War of the Worlds	Associate: Steven Spielberg	
2005	Memoirs of a Geisha	Assistant: Steven Spielberg	
2005	Munich	Associate: Steven Spielberg	
2006	Monster House	Assistant: Steven Spielberg	
2006	Flags of Our Fathers	Assistant: Steven Spielberg	
2006	Letters from Iwo Jima	Assistant: Steven Spielberg	
2010	Hereafter	Assistant: Steven Spielberg	
2010	True Grit	Assistant: Steven Spielberg	
2011	Super 8	Associate: Steven Spielberg	
2011	Transformers: Dark of the Moon	Assistant: Steven Spielberg	
2011	Cowboys & Aliens	Associate: Steven Spielberg	
2011	Real Steel	Associate: Steven Spielberg	
2011	The Adventures of Tintin	Associate: Steven Spielberg	
2012	Lincoln	Associate: Steven Spielberg	Uncredited
2014	Transformers: Age of Extinction	Associate: Steven Spielberg	

=== Television ===
Miscellaneous crew

Year	Title	Role
2001	Band of Brothers	Assistant: Steven Spielberg
2010	The Pacific	Assistant: Steven Spielberg

Thanks

Year	Title	Role	Notes
2010	Tales from the Future	Special thanks	Documentary
2017	Five Came Back	Very special thanks	Documentary
2017	Spielberg	Special thanks: For her invaluable support throughout this production	Documentary
2020	Natalie Wood: What Remains Behind	Special thanks	Documentary
