= Spielberg (surname) =

Spielberg is a German surname (spiel = play/game, berg = mountain). The name is thought to be derived from the name of a 14th century historical Špilberk Castle in Brno, Czech Republic. Jews were expelled from the city in 1454, taking the name of their former residence to other places in Europe.

Notable people with the surname include:

- Anne Spielberg (born 1949), American screenwriter and the sister of film director Steven Spielberg
- Arnold Spielberg (1917–2020), American electrical engineer and the father of film director Steven Spielberg
- Christine Spielberg (born 1941), German athlete
- David Spielberg (1939–2016), American television and film actor
- Larisa Spielberg (born 1980), American figure skater
- Robin Spielberg (born 1962), American pianist, composer and author
- Sasha Spielberg (born 1990), American actress, and the daughter of film director Steven Spielberg
- Steven Spielberg (born 1946), American film director and producer
