= National Board of Review Award for Best Director =

Annual film award

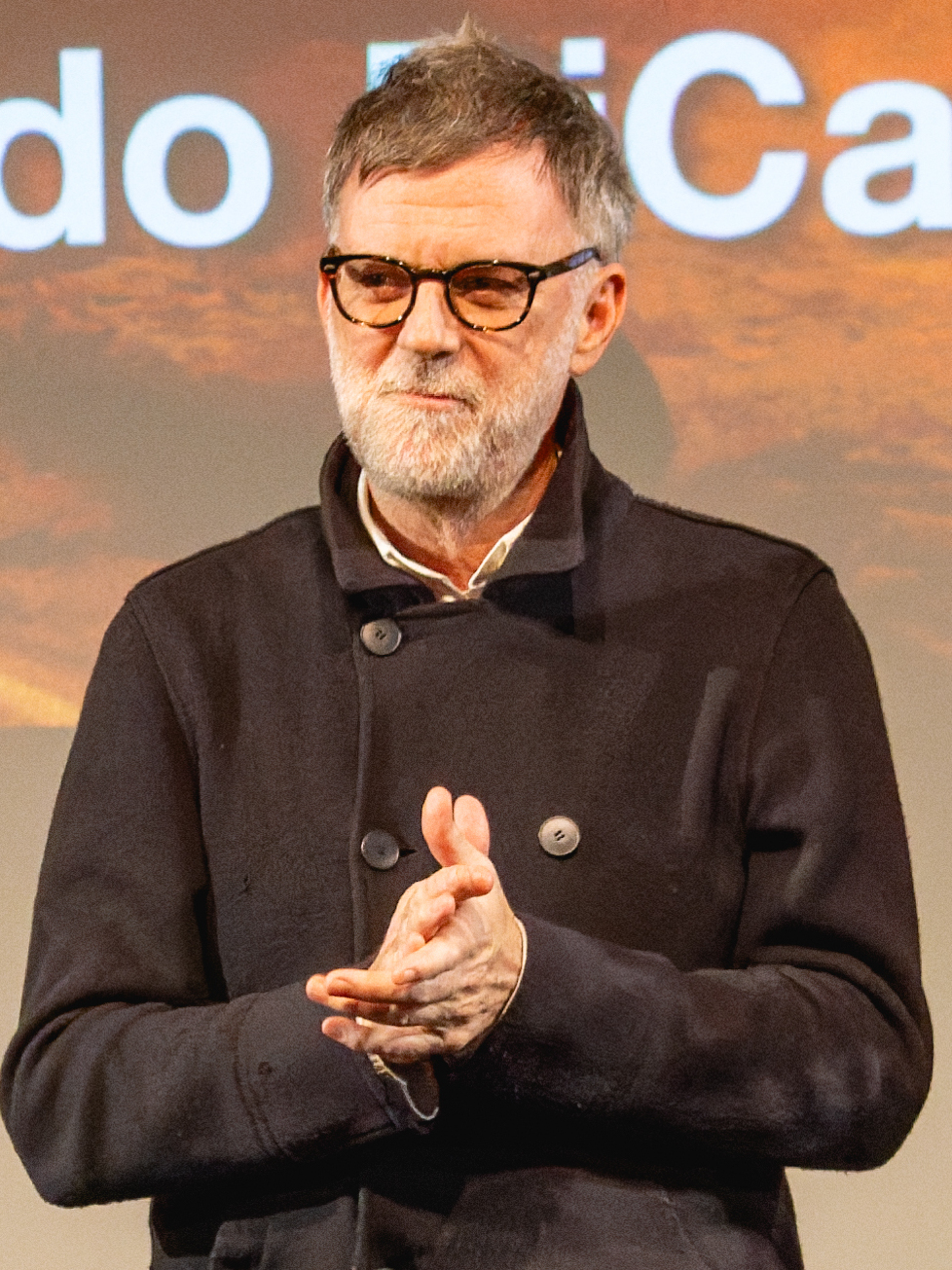
- Current recipient: Paul Thomas Anderson
- Awarded for: Best Director
- Country: United States
- Presented by: National Board of Review
- First award: Jean Renoir; The Southerner (1945)
- Currently held by: Paul Thomas Anderson; One Battle After Another (2025)
- Website: nationalboardofreview.org

The National Board of Review Award for Best Director is one of the annual film awards given (since 1945) by the National Board of Review of Motion Pictures.

== Winners ==
=== 1940s ===
Year	Winner	Film
1945	Jean Renoir	The Southerner
1946	William Wyler	The Best Years of Our Lives
1947	Elia Kazan	Boomerang!
1947	Elia Kazan	Gentleman's Agreement
1948	Roberto Rossellini	Paisan
1949	Vittorio De Sica	Bicycle Thieves

=== 1950s ===
Year	Winner	Film
1950	John Huston	The Asphalt Jungle
1951	Akira Kurosawa	Rashōmon
1952	David Lean	The Sound Barrier
1953	George Stevens	Shane
1954	Renato Castellani	Romeo and Juliet
1955	William Wyler	The Desperate Hours
1956	John Huston	Moby Dick
1957	David Lean	The Bridge on the River Kwai
1958	John Ford	The Last Hurrah
1959	Fred Zinnemann	The Nun's Story

=== 1960s ===
Year	Winner	Film
1960	Jack Cardiff	Sons and Lovers
1961	Jack Clayton	The Innocents
1962	David Lean	Lawrence of Arabia
1963	Tony Richardson	Tom Jones
1964	Desmond Davis	Girl with Green Eyes
1965	John Schlesinger	Darling
1966	Fred Zinnemann	A Man for All Seasons
1967	Richard Brooks	In Cold Blood
1968	Franco Zeffirelli	Romeo and Juliet
1969	Alfred Hitchcock	Topaz

=== 1970s ===
Year	Winner	Film
1970	François Truffaut	The Wild Child
1971	Ken Russell	The Boy Friend
1971	Ken Russell	The Devils
1972	Bob Fosse	Cabaret
1973	Ingmar Bergman	Cries and Whispers
1974	Francis Ford Coppola	The Conversation
1975	Robert Altman	Nashville
1975	Stanley Kubrick	Barry Lyndon
1976	Alan J. Pakula	All the President's Men
1977	Luis Buñuel	That Obscure Object of Desire
1978	Ingmar Bergman	Autumn Sonata
1979	John Schlesinger	Yanks

=== 1980s ===
Year	Winner	Film
1980	Robert Redford	Ordinary People
1981	Warren Beatty	Reds
1982	Sidney Lumet	The Verdict
1983	James L. Brooks	Terms of Endearment
1984	David Lean	A Passage to India
1985	Akira Kurosawa	Ran
1986	Woody Allen	Hannah and Her Sisters
1987	Steven Spielberg	Empire of the Sun
1988	Alan Parker	Mississippi Burning
1989	Kenneth Branagh	Henry V

=== 1990s ===
Year	Winner	Film
1990	Kevin Costner	Dances with Wolves
1991	Jonathan Demme	The Silence of the Lambs
1992	James Ivory	Howards End
1993	Martin Scorsese	The Age of Innocence
1994	Quentin Tarantino	Pulp Fiction
1995	Ang Lee	Sense and Sensibility
1996	Joel Coen	Fargo
1997	Curtis Hanson	L.A. Confidential
1998	Shekhar Kapur	Elizabeth
1999	Anthony Minghella	The Talented Mr. Ripley

=== 2000s ===
Year	Winner	Film
2000	Steven Soderbergh	Erin Brockovich
2000	Steven Soderbergh	Traffic
2001	Todd Field	In the Bedroom
2002	Phillip Noyce	The Quiet American
2002	Phillip Noyce	Rabbit-Proof Fence
2003	Edward Zwick	The Last Samurai
2004	Michael Mann	Collateral
2005	Ang Lee	Brokeback Mountain
2006	Martin Scorsese	The Departed
2007	Tim Burton	Sweeney Todd: The Demon Barber of Fleet Street
2008	David Fincher	The Curious Case of Benjamin Button
2009	Clint Eastwood	Invictus

=== 2010s ===
Year	Winner	Film
2010	David Fincher	The Social Network
2011	Martin Scorsese	Hugo
2012	Kathryn Bigelow	Zero Dark Thirty
2013	Spike Jonze	Her
2014	Clint Eastwood	American Sniper
2015	Ridley Scott	The Martian
2016	Barry Jenkins	Moonlight
2017	Greta Gerwig	Lady Bird
2018	Bradley Cooper	A Star Is Born
2019	Quentin Tarantino	Once Upon a Time in Hollywood

=== 2020s ===
Year	Winner	Film
2020	Spike Lee	Da 5 Bloods
2021	Paul Thomas Anderson	Licorice Pizza
2022	Steven Spielberg	The Fabelmans
2023	Martin Scorsese	Killers of the Flower Moon
2024	Jon M. Chu	Wicked
2025	Paul Thomas Anderson	One Battle After Another

== Multiple winners ==
- David Lean - 4
- Martin Scorsese - 4
- Paul Thomas Anderson - 2
- Ingmar Bergman - 2
- Clint Eastwood - 2
- David Fincher - 2
- John Huston - 2
- Akira Kurosawa - 2
- Ang Lee - 2
- John Schlesinger - 2
- Steven Spielberg - 2
- Quentin Tarantino - 2
- William Wyler - 2
- Fred Zinnemann - 2
