= Anne Spielberg =

American screenwriter and film producer (born 1949)

- Born: December 25, 1949 (age 76); Philadelphia, Pennsylvania, U.S.
- Occupations: Screenwriter; producer
- Years active: 1968–present
- Spouse: Danny Opatoshu
- Parents: Arnold Spielberg (father); Leah Posner (mother)
- Relatives: Steven Spielberg (brother); Nancy Spielberg (sister); Kate Capshaw (sister-in-law)

Anne Spielberg (born December 25, 1949) is an American screenwriter, author, and film producer. She is best known as the co-producer and co-writer of the screenplay for the 1988 movie Big. She is the younger sister of film director Steven Spielberg.

== Early life ==
Born on December 25, 1949, in Philadelphia, Pennsylvania, Anne Spielberg is a daughter of the late Arnold Spielberg, a native of Cincinnati, Ohio, and the late Leah (née Posner) Spielberg, and also the sister of filmmaker Steven Spielberg, Nancy Spielberg and Sue Spielberg.

== Career ==
After working for her brother's production company, Amblin Entertainment, Spielberg and her neighbor Gary Ross co-wrote the movie Big in 1988, for which she was nominated for an Academy Award, and the Writer's Guild Award for Best Original Screenplay. The screenplay also was awarded the Saturn Award and The Peoples Choice Award. Spielberg was also a co-producer on the film, along with noted television and film producer James L. Brooks. Spielberg was an uncredited co-writer of the Amblin Entertainment film Small Soldiers (1998). She wrote an unusually poignant episode of Amblin's tv series, "Amazing Stories" titled, "What if...?", directed by Joan Darling. Anne Spielberg was an uncredited writer on Amblin's animated feature film, "Feivel Goes West."

In 2025, Pierce Press announced the acquisition of Spielberg’s children's picture book, The Iceberg and the Penguin, to be published April 22, 2027, with artist Daniel Fiore chosen to provide illustrations. The forthcoming book was described by the publisher as “an engaging and hopeful story, (which) delivers a poignant message on climate change.”

== In popular culture ==
Her life, and the lives of her siblings, were depicted in Steven Spielberg's 2022 semi-autobiographical film, The Fabelmans, with her portrayed as the fictional Reggie Fabelman, the first younger sister of the main character Sammy Fabelman (Gabriel LaBelle). She was played by Julia Butters.
