= Arnold Spielberg =

American electrical engineer (1917–2020)

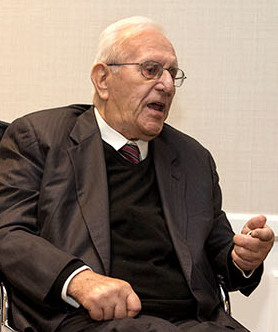
- Spielberg in 2014
- Born: Arnold Meyer Spielberg; February 6, 1917; Cincinnati, Ohio, U.S.
- Died: August 25, 2020 (aged 103); Los Angeles, California, U.S.
- Education: University of Cincinnati
- Occupation: Electrical engineer
- Known for: GE-200 series
- Spouses: Leah Posner (m. 1945; div. 1965) Bernice Colner (m. 1997; died 2016)
- Children: 4, including Steven, Anne, and Nancy
- Relatives: Sasha Spielberg (granddaughter); Sawyer Spielberg (grandson); Destry Spielberg (granddaughter); Kate Capshaw (daughter-in-law)
- Awards: Computer Pioneer Award (2006)
- Scientific career
- Fields: Electrical engineer

Arnold Meyer Spielberg (February 6, 1917 – August 25, 2020) was an American electrical engineer. He was instrumental in contributions to "real-time data acquisition and recording that significantly contributed to the definition of modern feedback and control processes". For General Electric, he designed, with his colleague Charles Propster, the GE-225 mainframe computer in 1959. He cited as his greatest contribution the first computer-controlled "point of sale" cash register. His children include filmmaker Steven Spielberg, screenwriter Anne Spielberg, and producer Nancy Spielberg.

== Early life and career ==
Spielberg was born in Cincinnati on February 6, 1917. He was of Jewish descent. His mother, Rebecca (née Chechick), was born in Sudylkiv, Ukraine; his father, Samuel, was born in Kamianets-Podilskyi, Ukraine. They later immigrated to the United States, meeting and eventually marrying in Cincinnati.

From the age of nine, he began building radios. He scrounged parts from garbage cans to assemble his first crystal receiver. He grew up in Avondale, Cincinnati. Spielberg graduated from Hughes High School in 1934. In 1934, he worked in Cynthiana, Kentucky, for his cousin's Lerman Brothers department store.

"At 15, Arnold became a ham radio operator, building his own transmitter, a skill that proved fortuitous when he was drafted into the U.S. Army in January 1942, one month after the Japanese attack on Pearl Harbor, and joined the Signal Corps."

After training as a radio operator/gunner for the Air Corps, his skills in the design of new airplane antennas elevated him to the position of Communications Chief in the 490th Bomb Squadron, a B-25 squadron in India. During the Holocaust, Spielberg lost between 16 and 20 relatives.

Spielberg married concert pianist Leah Posner (1920–2017) in January 1945. After graduating from the University of Cincinnati with a Bachelor of Science in Electrical Engineering, he joined RCA's Advanced Development Department in 1949, where he did early work on servo and guidance systems. In 1955, he joined General Electric's computer department in Schenectady, New York. In 1957, he and his family relocated to Phoenix, where he founded the G.E. Industrial Computer Department. He left G.E. in 1963, and the following year they moved to Los Gatos, California. In 1965, Arnold and Leah Spielberg divorced, and he moved with his son Steven to Saratoga, California.

== Moscow ==
In 1960, Spielberg traveled to Moscow as part of a delegation of electrical engineers from Phoenix. The trip coincided with an incident that became the subject of his son's 2015 film Bridge of Spies. Steven Spielberg described the event his father experienced at the time:

The Russians were putting the pilot Gary Powers' helmet and his flight suit and the remains of the U-2 plane on show for everyone in Russia to see. A military man saw my father's American passport and took him to the head of the queue and repeated really angrily to the crowd, "look what your country is doing to us."

== Work ==
When RCA entered the computer field, Spielberg began doing early circuit designs implementing computer logic. Moving into systems design, he was responsible for the design of a tape-to-tape data sorter. He designed and patented the first electronic library system, implemented as an interrogation system for data stored on an array of magnetic tapes. Promoted to Manager of Advanced Product Development, he was given responsibility for development of a point-of-sale system. The system involved a central processing computer called Recorder Central with ten point-of-sale satellite units. The system had many of the capabilities of later point-of-sale systems, including error-checking, price lookup, calculation of sales tax and discounts, and credit verification.

In 1957, Spielberg began working for General Electric, where he was instrumental in developing the GE-200 series of computers. The GE-225 was derived from the GE-312 and 412 process-control computers. Spielberg and Charles "Chuck" H. Propster had worked together at RCA on BIZMAC before designing the GE-225, which was introduced in 1960. Spielberg went on to work for Burroughs where he was the manager of the B4900 hardware.

Spielberg retired in 1991 but continued consultation work for technology companies. He also worked with the USC Shoah Foundation Institute for Visual History and Education, formerly Survivors of the Shoah Visual History Foundation, an organization founded by his son Steven.

== Personal life and death ==
Spielberg had four children with his first wife Leah: son Steven and daughters Anne, Nancy, and Sue. He also had 14 grandchildren and 20 great-grandchildren. His second wife, Bernice Colner, died in 2016. Spielberg died from natural causes at his home in Los Angeles, California, on August 25, 2020, at the age of 103.

Steven Spielberg's 2022 film The Fabelmans is a fictionalized account of his own childhood, and features Paul Dano as engineer Burt Fabelman, the father of the film's protagonist Sammy Fabelman.

== Recognition ==
- IEEE 2006 Computer Pioneer Award
