= Steven Spielberg filmography =

Films by the American filmmaker

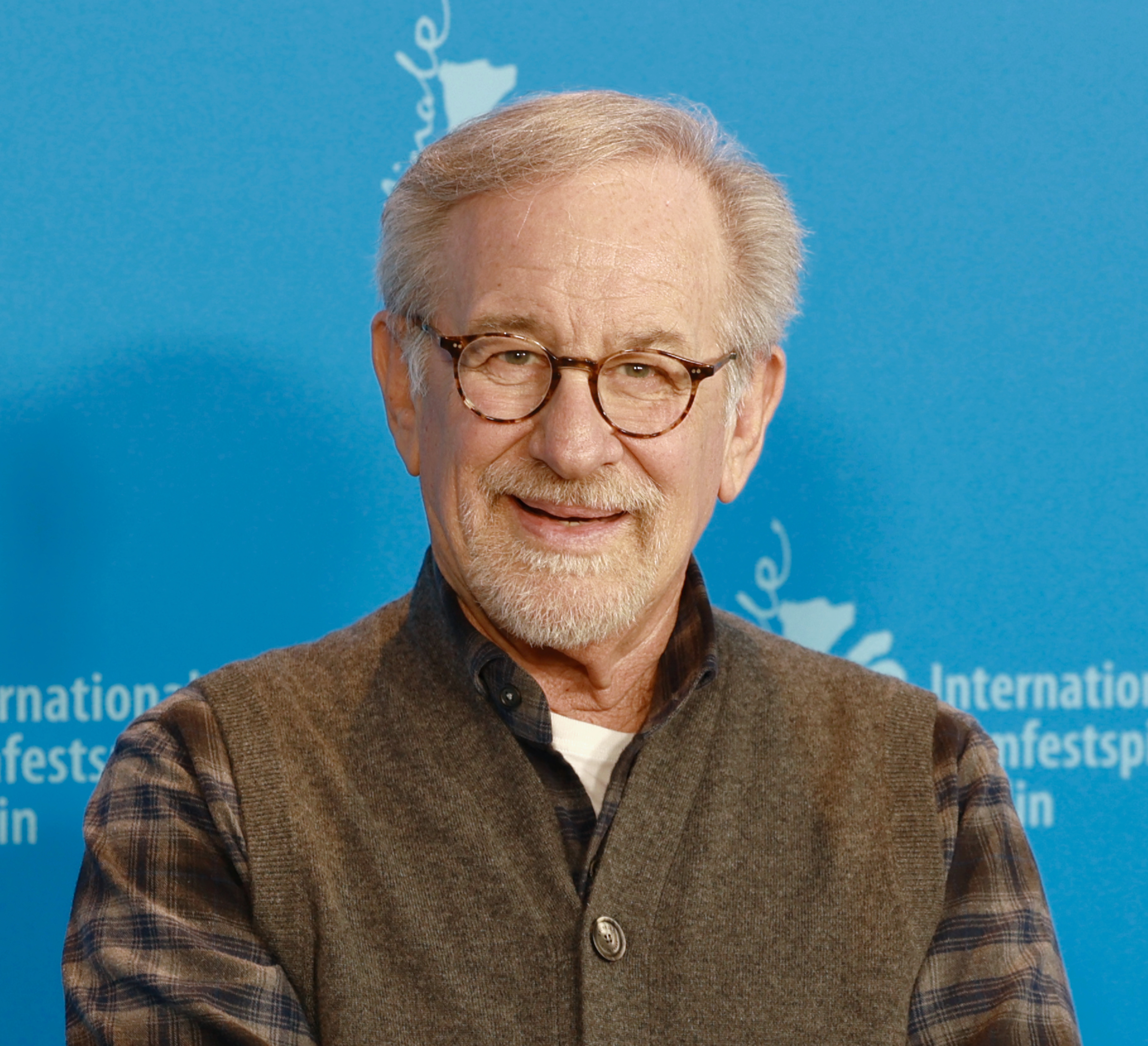
Spielberg in 2023

Steven Spielberg is an American filmmaker. He is considered one of the founding pioneers of the New Hollywood era, as well as one of the most popular directors and producers in film history. He is also one of the co-founders of Amblin Entertainment and DreamWorks Pictures.

In a career spanning more than five decades, Spielberg's films have spanned many themes and genres. Spielberg's early science-fiction and adventure films were seen as archetypes of modern Hollywood escapist filmmaking. In later years, his films began addressing humanistic issues such as the transatlantic slave trade, civil rights, war, and terrorism.

Spielberg won the Academy Award for Best Director for Schindler's List and Saving Private Ryan, as well as receiving six other nominations. Three of Spielberg's films—Jaws, E.T. the Extra-Terrestrial, and Jurassic Park—achieved box office records, originated, and came to epitomize the blockbuster film. The worldwide box office receipts of all Spielberg-directed films exceed $10 billion, making him the highest-grossing director in cinematic history.

== Film ==
Spielberg has worked as a producer, executive producer, director, or in an otherwise creative capacity on several films where he was not credited.

Key
†	Denotes films that have not yet been released

=== Director and writer ===
==== Short films ====
Year	Film	Credited as			Notes
Year	Film	Director	Producer	Writer	Notes
1959	The Last Gun	Yes	Yes	No	
1961	Fighter Squad	Yes	Yes	Yes	
1961	Escape to Nowhere	Yes	Yes	Yes	
1967	Slipstream	Yes	Yes	Yes	Unfinished
1968	Amblin'	Yes	No	Yes	Also uncredited editor

==== Feature films ====
Year	Title	Director	Producer	Writer	Notes	Refs.
1964	Firelight	Yes	No	Yes	Partially lost	
1971	Duel	Yes	No	No	Extended theatrical version of original TV movie	
1973	Ace Eli and Rodger of the Skies	No	No	Story		
1974	The Sugarland Express	Yes	No	Story	Theatrical film directing debut	
1975	Jaws	Yes	No	No	Inducted into the National Film Registry in 2001	
1977	Close Encounters of the Third Kind	Yes	No	Yes	Also visual effects concepts Inducted into the National Film Registry in 2007	
1979	1941	Yes	No	No		
1981	Raiders of the Lost Ark	Yes	No	No	Inducted into the National Film Registry in 1999	
1982	E.T. the Extra-Terrestrial	Yes	Yes	No	Inducted into the National Film Registry in 1994	
1982	Poltergeist	No (Note: Spielberg has sometimes been suggested to be an uncredited co-director or even the main director over Tobe Hooper, with differing accounts by crew. See Poltergeist (1982 film) § Creative credit.)	Yes	Yes		
1983	Twilight Zone: The Movie	Yes	Yes	No	Segment: "Kick the Can"	
1984	Indiana Jones and the Temple of Doom	Yes	No	No		
1985	The Color Purple	Yes	Yes	No		
1985	The Goonies	No	Executive	Story	Also uncredited second-unit director and editor	
1987	Empire of the Sun	Yes	Yes	No		
1989	Indiana Jones and the Last Crusade	Yes	No	No		
1989	Always	Yes	Yes	No		
1991	Hook	Yes	No	No		
1993	Jurassic Park	Yes	No	No	Inducted into the National Film Registry in 2018	
1993	Schindler's List	Yes	Yes	No	Inducted into the National Film Registry in 2004	
1997	The Lost World: Jurassic Park	Yes	No	No		
1997	Amistad	Yes	Yes	No		
1998	Saving Private Ryan	Yes	Yes	No	Inducted into the National Film Registry in 2014	
2001	A.I. Artificial Intelligence	Yes	Yes	Yes		
2002	Minority Report	Yes	No	No		
2002	Catch Me If You Can	Yes	Yes	No		
2004	The Terminal	Yes	Yes	No		
2005	War of the Worlds	Yes	No	No		
2005	Munich	Yes	Yes	No		
2008	Indiana Jones and the Kingdom of the Crystal Skull	Yes	No	No		
2011	The Adventures of Tintin	Yes	Yes	No	Also lighting consultant and uncredited virtual camera operator	
2011	War Horse	Yes	Yes	No		
2012	Lincoln	Yes	Yes	No		
2015	Bridge of Spies	Yes	Yes	No		
2016	The BFG	Yes	Yes	No		
2017	The Post	Yes	Yes	No		
2018	Ready Player One	Yes	Yes	No		
2021	West Side Story	Yes	Yes	No	Also end title designer	
2022	The Fabelmans	Yes	Yes	Yes		
2026	Disclosure Day	Yes	Yes	Story	co-produced with Kristie Macosko Krieger	

=== Producing credits ===
==== Producer ====
Year	Title	Director	Notes	Ref.
1991	An American Tail: Fievel Goes West	Phil Nibbelink; Simon Wells		
2005	Memoirs of a Geisha	Rob Marshall		
2006	Flags of Our Fathers	Clint Eastwood		
2006	Letters from Iwo Jima	Clint Eastwood		
2011	Super 8	J. J. Abrams		
2014	The Hundred-Foot Journey	Lasse Hallström		
2015	Auschwitz	James Moll	Short film	
2023	Maestro	Bradley Cooper		
2023	The Color Purple	Blitz the Ambassador		
2024	Music by John Williams	Laurent Bouzereau	Documentary film	
2025	Hamnet	Chloé Zhao		

==== Executive producer ====
Year	Title	Director	Notes	Ref.
1978	I Wanna Hold Your Hand	Robert Zemeckis		
1980	Used Cars	Robert Zemeckis		
1981	Continental Divide	Michael Apted		
1984	Gremlins	Joe Dante		
1985	Back to the Future	Robert Zemeckis		
1985	Young Sherlock Holmes	Barry Levinson		
1986	An American Tail	Don Bluth		
1986	The Money Pit	Richard Benjamin		
1987	Batteries Not Included	Matthew Robbins		
1987	Innerspace	Joe Dante		
1988	Who Framed Roger Rabbit	Robert Zemeckis		
1988	The Land Before Time	Don Bluth		
1989	Back to the Future Part II	Robert Zemeckis		
1989	Tummy Trouble	Rob Minkoff; Frank Marshall	Short film	
1989	Dad	Gary David Goldberg		
1990	Arachnophobia	Frank Marshall	Also uncredited second-unit director	
1990	Dreams	Akira Kurosawa		
1990	Back to the Future Part III	Robert Zemeckis		
1990	Roller Coaster Rabbit	Rob Minkoff; Frank Marshall	Short film	
1990	Gremlins 2: The New Batch	Joe Dante		
1990	Joe Versus the Volcano	John Patrick Shanley		
1992	Tiny Toon Adventures: How I Spent My Vacation	Rich Arons; Ken Boyer; Kent Butterworth; Barry Caldwell; Alfred Gimeno; Art Leonardi; Byron Vaughns	Direct-to-video	
1993	Trail Mix-Up	Barry Cook	Short film	
1993	We're Back! A Dinosaur's Story	Dick Zondag; Ralph Zondag; Phil Nibbelink; Simon Wells		
1994	The Flintstones	Brian Levant		
1995	Casper	Brad Silberling		
1995	Balto	Simon Wells		
1996	Twister	Jan de Bont		
1997	Men in Black	Barry Sonnenfeld		
1998	The Mask of Zorro	Martin Campbell		
1998	Deep Impact	Mimi Leder		
1999	Wakko's Wish	Liz Holzman; Rusty Mills; Tom Ruegger	Direct-to-video	
2001	Jurassic Park III	Joe Johnston		
2002	Men in Black II	Barry Sonnenfeld		
2005	The Legend of Zorro	Martin Campbell		
2006	Monster House	Gil Kenan		
2007	Transformers	Michael Bay		
2008	Eagle Eye	D. J. Caruso		
2009	Transformers: Revenge of the Fallen	Michael Bay		
2009	The Lovely Bones	Peter Jackson		
2010	Hereafter	Clint Eastwood		
2010	True Grit	Coen brothers		
2011	Transformers: Dark of the Moon	Michael Bay		
2011	Cowboys & Aliens	Jon Favreau		
2011	Real Steel	Shawn Levy		
2012	Men in Black 3	Barry Sonnenfeld		
2014	Transformers: Age of Extinction	Michael Bay		
2015	Jurassic World	Colin Trevorrow		
2017	Transformers: The Last Knight	Michael Bay		
2018	Jurassic World: Fallen Kingdom	J.A. Bayona		
2018	First Man	Damien Chazelle		
2018	Bumblebee	Travis Knight		
2019	Men in Black: International	F. Gary Gray		
2022	Jurassic World: Dominion	Colin Trevorrow		
2023	Transformers: Rise of the Beasts	Steven Caple Jr.		
2023	Indiana Jones and the Dial of Destiny	James Mangold		
2024	Twisters	Lee Isaac Chung		
2024	Transformers One	Josh Cooley		
2025	Jurassic World Rebirth	Gareth Edwards		

=== Documentary films ===
Year	Title	Director	Ref.
1998	The Last Days	James Moll	
2000	A Holocaust szemei	János Szász	
2006	Spell Your Name	Sergey Bukovsky	
2013	Don't Say No Until I Finish Talking: The Story of Richard D. Zanuck	Laurent Bouzereau	
2016	Finding Oscar	Ryan Suffern	

=== Cameos ===
Year	Film	Role	Director
1975	Jaws	Amity Point Lifestation Worker (voice)	Steven Spielberg
1980	The Blues Brothers	Cook County Assessor	John Landis
1984	Indiana Jones and the Temple of Doom	Tourist at Airport	Steven Spielberg
1984	Gremlins	Man in Electric Wheelchair	Joe Dante
1990	Gremlins 2: The New Batch	Man in scooter	Joe Dante
1997	The Lost World: Jurassic Park	Man Eating Popcorn	Steven Spielberg
1997	Men in Black	Alien on TV Monitor	Barry Sonnenfeld
2001	Vanilla Sky	Guest at party	Cameron Crowe
2002	Austin Powers in Goldmember	Himself	Jay Roach
2011	Paul	Himself (voice)	Greg Mottola

=== Documentary appearances ===
Year	Film
1982	Room 666
2000	Chuck Jones: Extremes & Inbetweens – A Life in Animation
2001	Stanley Kubrick: A Life in Pictures
2004	Double Dare
2004	The Cutting Edge: The Magic of Movie Editing
2005	Directed by John Ford
2006	The Shark Is Still Working
2010	Hollywood Don't Surf!
2011	Ray Harryhausen: Special Effects Titan
2013	Drew: The Man Behind the Poster
2015	Everything Is Copy
2015	Back in Time
2016	Mike Nichols: American Masters
2016	Score: A Film Music Documentary
2017	Spielberg
2019	The Movies
2022	Light & Magic
2023	Albert Brooks: Defending My Life
2024	Music by John Williams
2025	Jaws @ 50: The Definitive Inside Story
2026	Marty, Life is Short

=== Other uncredited roles ===
Year	Film	Role	Director	Ref.
1983	Scarface	Co-directed one scene for Brian De Palma	Brian De Palma	
1984	The NeverEnding Story	Assisted in post-production	Wolfgang Petersen	
2000	Gladiator	Creative consultant	Ridley Scott	
2005	Star Wars: Episode III – Revenge of the Sith	Second-unit director	George Lucas	
2011	Fright Night	Storyboarding scenes and assistance with editing	Craig Gillespie	
2013	The Wolf of Wall Street	Co-directed one scene for Martin Scorsese	Martin Scorsese	
2019	How to Train Your Dragon: The Hidden World	Provided some story suggestions to Dean DeBlois	Dean DeBlois	
2025	Jurassic World Rebirth	Creative consultant	Gareth Edwards	

== Box office performances of feature films ==
Year	Film	Budget	Domestic	Total worldwide
1971	Duel	$450,000	N/A	$2,544
1974	The Sugarland Express	$3,000,000	$7,500,000	$7,505,166
1975	Jaws	$9,000,000	$280,083,300	$490,736,300
1977	Close Encounters of the Third Kind	$19,400,000	$135,189,114	$306,889,114
1979	1941	$35,000,000	$31,755,742	$92,455,742
1981	Raiders of the Lost Ark	$20,000,000	$248,159,971	$389,925,971
1982	E.T. the Extra-Terrestrial	$10,500,000	$439,454,989	$797,307,407
1983	Twilight Zone: The Movie	$10,000,000	$29,450,919	$29,450,919
1984	Indiana Jones and the Temple of Doom	$28,200,000	$179,870,271	$333,107,271
1985	The Color Purple	$15,000,000	$98,467,863	$98,468,102
1987	Empire of the Sun	$25,000,000	$22,238,696	$22,239,121
1989	Always	$31,000,000	$43,858,790	$74,134,790
1989	Indiana Jones and the Last Crusade	$48,000,000	$197,171,806	$474,171,806
1991	Hook	$70,000,000	$119,654,823	$300,854,823
1993	Jurassic Park	$63,000,000	$407,185,075	$1,103,136,084
1993	Schindler's List	$22,000,000	$96,898,818	$322,161,245
1997	The Lost World: Jurassic Park	$73,000,000	$229,086,679	$618,638,999
1997	Amistad	$36,000,000	$44,229,441	$44,229,441
1998	Saving Private Ryan	$70,000,000	$217,049,603	$482,352,390
2001	A.I. Artificial Intelligence	$100,000,000	$78,616,689	$235,926,635
2002	Minority Report	$102,000,000	$132,072,926	$358,372,926
2002	Catch Me If You Can	$52,000,000	$164,615,351	$352,114,312
2004	The Terminal	$60,000,000	$77,872,883	$219,100,084
2005	War of the Worlds	$132,000,000	$234,280,354	$603,874,366
2005	Munich	$70,000,000	$47,403,685	$130,982,407
2008	Indiana Jones and the Kingdom of the Crystal Skull	$185,000,000	$317,101,119	$786,636,033
2011	The Adventures of Tintin	$135,000,000	$77,591,831	$373,994,233
2011	War Horse	$70,000,000	$79,884,879	$177,584,879
2012	Lincoln	$65,000,000	$182,207,973	$275,293,450
2015	Bridge of Spies	$40,000,000	$72,313,754	$165,478,839
2016	The BFG	$140,000,000	$55,483,770	$194,670,610
2017	The Post	$50,000,000	$81,903,458	$193,764,664
2018	Ready Player One	$175,000,000	$137,715,350	$607,874,422
2021	West Side Story	$100,000,000	$38,530,322	$76,016,171
2022	The Fabelmans	$40,000,000	$17,348,945	$45,614,213
2026	Disclosure Day	$115,000,000	$116,636,645	$241,492,397
Total		$2,219,550,000	$4,738,885,834	$11,026,557,876

== Critical reception of feature films ==
Year	Film	Rotten Tomatoes	Metacritic	Cinemascore
1971	Duel	90% (49 reviews)	81/100 (15 reviews)	N/A
1974	The Sugarland Express	87% (53 reviews)	65/100 (4 reviews)	N/A
1975	Jaws	97% (178 reviews)	87/100 (21 reviews)	N/A
1977	Close Encounters of the Third Kind	91% (118 reviews)	90/100 (10 reviews)	N/A
1979	1941	37% (27 reviews)	34/100 (7 reviews)	B
1981	Raiders of the Lost Ark	94% (157 reviews)	86/100 (17 reviews)	A+
1982	E.T. the Extra-Terrestrial	99% (149 reviews)	92/100 (30 reviews)	A+
1983	Twilight Zone: The Movie	57% (42 reviews)	44/100 (8 reviews)	N/A
1984	Indiana Jones and the Temple of Doom	77% (138 reviews)	57/100 (14 reviews)	N/A
1985	The Color Purple	73% (128 reviews)	78/100 (7 reviews)	N/A
1987	Empire of the Sun	75% (67 reviews)	62/100 (22 reviews)	B+
1989	Always	72% (29 reviews)	50/100 (16 reviews)	A-
1989	Indiana Jones and the Last Crusade	84% (139 reviews)	65/100 (14 reviews)	A
1991	Hook	37% (139 reviews)	52/100 (19 reviews)	A-
1993	Jurassic Park	91% (203 reviews)	68/100 (21 reviews)	A
1993	Schindler's List	98% (135 reviews)	95/100 (30 reviews)	A+
1997	The Lost World: Jurassic Park	57% (153 reviews)	59/100 (18 reviews)	B+
1997	Amistad	78% (68 reviews)	64/100 (23 reviews)	A-
1998	Saving Private Ryan	94% (148 reviews)	91/100 (38 reviews)	A
2001	A.I. Artificial Intelligence	76% (202 reviews)	65/100 (32 reviews)	C+
2002	Minority Report	89% (262 reviews)	80/100 (37 reviews)	B+
2002	Catch Me If You Can	96% (204 reviews)	75/100 (39 reviews)	A-
2004	The Terminal	61% (207 reviews)	55/100 (41 reviews)	A-
2005	War of the Worlds	76% (264 reviews)	73/100 (40 reviews)	B+
2005	Munich	79% (210 reviews)	74/100 (39 reviews)	B+
2008	Indiana Jones and the Kingdom of the Crystal Skull	77% (307 reviews)	65/100 (40 reviews)	B
2011	The Adventures of Tintin	75% (233 reviews)	68/100 (40 reviews)	A-
2011	War Horse	74% (240 reviews)	72/100 (40 reviews)	A-
2012	Lincoln	90% (287 reviews)	87/100 (45 reviews)	A
2015	Bridge of Spies	91% (312 reviews)	81/100 (48 reviews)	A
2016	The BFG	74% (308 reviews)	66/100 (48 reviews)	A-
2017	The Post	88% (396 reviews)	83/100 (51 reviews)	A
2018	Ready Player One	71% (443 reviews)	64/100 (56 reviews)	A-
2021	West Side Story	91% (388 reviews)	85/100 (62 reviews)	A
2022	The Fabelmans	92% (396 reviews)	85/100 (65 reviews)	A
2026	Disclosure Day	79% (437 reviews)	74/100 (63 reviews)	B

== Television ==
=== As director ===
Year	Title	Notes
1969, 1971	Night Gallery	Pilot movie segment B "Eyes"; Ep. 4 segment A "Make Me Laugh"
1970	Marcus Welby, M.D.	Ep. 1–24 "The Daredevil Gesture"
1971	The Name of the Game	Ep. 3–16 "L.A. 2017"
1971	The Psychiatrist	Ep. 1–2 "The Private World of Martin Dalton" and Ep. 1–6 "Par for the Course"
1971	Columbo	Ep. 1–1 "Murder by the Book"
1971	Owen Marshall: Counselor at Law	Ep. 1–3 "Eulogy for a Wide Receiver"
1971	Duel	Television film, extended film version was also released to cinemas
1972	Something Evil	Television film
1973	Savage	Television film, also editor
1984	Strokes of Genius	TV series (introductory segments hosted by Dustin Hoffman)
1985–1987	Amazing Stories	Ep. 1–1 "Ghost Train" and Ep. 1–5 "The Mission" (part of Amazing Stories: Book One); Also developer, writer of several episodes and executive producer

=== As executive producer ===
Year	Title	Notes	Ref.
1990–1992	Tiny Toon Adventures	Also voiced himself (Episode: "Buster and Babs Go Hawaiian")	
1991	A Wish for Wings That Work		
1992	The Water Engine		
1992	The Plucky Duck Show		
1993–1995	SeaQuest DSV		
1993	Family Dog		
1993–1998	Animaniacs		
1993	Class of '61		
1994	Tiny Toon Adventures: Spring Break		
1994	ER		
1995–1998	Pinky and the Brain		
1995	Tiny Toon Adventures: Night Ghoulery		
1995–1997	Freakazoid!		
1996	Champs		
1996–1997	High Incident	Also co-creator and story co-writer in "Pilot"	
1996	Survivors of the Holocaust	Also starring as himself	
1998–1999	Toonsylvania		
1998	Invasion America		
1998–1999	Pinky, Elmyra & the Brain		
2000	Shooting War	Documentary	
2001	Price for Peace		
2001	We Stand Alone Together		
2001	Band of Brothers		
2001	Semper Fi		
2002	Taken		
2003	Burma Bridge Busters		
2004	Voices from the List		
2005	Into the West		
2005	Dan Finnerty & the Dan Band: I Am Woman		
2009–2011	United States of Tara		
2010	The Pacific		
2011–2015	Falling Skies		
2011	Terra Nova		
2011	Locke & Key		
2012–2013	Smash		
2012	The River		
2013	Lucky 7		
2013–2015	Under the Dome		
2014–2015	Extant		
2014–2015	Red Band Society		
2015	The Whispers		
2015	Public Morals		
2015	Minority Report		
2016	All the Way	Television film	
2016–2019	Bull		
2017	Five Came Back	Also starring as himself	
2019	Why We Hate	Documentary	
2020	Amazing Stories		
2020–2022	Jurassic World Camp Cretaceous		
2020–2023	Animaniacs		
2021	Oslo	Television film	
2022–2024	Halo		
2023–present	Gremlins: Secrets of the Mogwai		
2023–2025	Tiny Toons Looniversity		
2023	Life on Our Planet	Documentary	
2024	Masters of the Air		
2024–2025	Jurassic World: Chaos Theory		
2026	The Dinosaurs	Documentary	
2026	Cape Fear		

=== Amazing Stories (1985–87) writing credits ===
Season	Ep.	Title	Credited as
1	1	"Ghost Train"	Story by
1	2	"The Main Attraction"	Story by
1	3	"Alamo Jobe"	Story by
1	4	"Mummy Daddy"	Story by
1	5	"The Mission"	Story by
1	6	"The Amazing Falsworth"	Story by
1	7	"Fine Tuning"	Story by
1	10	"Remote Control Man"	Story by
1	11	"Santa '85"	Story by
1	12	"Vanessa in the Garden"	Written by
1	14	"No Day at the Beach"	Story by
1	16	"Gather Ye Acorns"	Story by
1	18	"Dorothy and Ben"	Story by
1	19	"Mirror, Mirror"	Story by
2	1	"The Wedding Ring"	Story by
2	5	"You Gotta Believe Me"	Story by
2	6	"The Greibble"	Story by
2	14	"Blue Man Down"	Story by

== Video games ==
Year	Title	Notes	Ref.
1982	E.T. the Extra-Terrestrial	Writer	
1995	The Dig	Writer	
1996	Steven Spielberg's Director's Chair		
1999	Medal of Honor	Designer	
2000	Medal of Honor: Underground		
2002	Medal of Honor: Allied Assault	Writer	
2002	Quest for the Code		
2008	Boom Blox	Designer	
2009	Boom Blox Bash Party	Designer	
2009	Indiana Jones and the Staff of Kings	Creative consultant	

== Music videos ==
Year	Title	Credited as			Ref.
Year	Title	Director	Producer	Other	Ref.
1985	"The Goonies 'R' Good Enough"	No	Yes	Actor	
1989	"Liberian Girl"	No	No	Cameo	
2022	"Cannibal"	Yes	No	No	

== Books ==
Year	Title	Role
2020	Ready Player Two	Creative consultant in the final draft

== See also ==
- Steven Spielberg's unrealized projects
