= Laurent Bouzereau =

French director and filmmaker

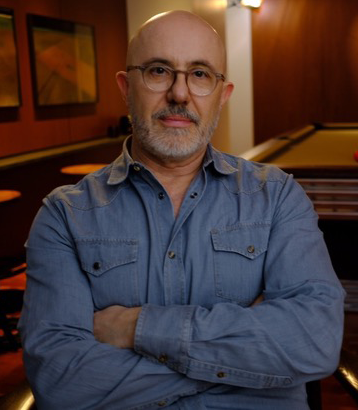
- Born: France
- Occupations: Filmmaker, producer, author
- Years active: 1983–present
- Spouse(s): Markus Keith, (2001–present)
- Website: Nedland Media.

Laurent Bouzereau is a French-American Grammy Award winning filmmaker, producer, and author, with EMMY-award nominated films. He is the co-founder of Nedland Films, with his partner Markus Keith. Together, they are developing narrative films, television series, and documentaries.

== Life and career ==
Laurent Bouzereau won a Grammy Award for Best Music Documentary for Music by John Williams about the life and career of composer John Williams, produced by Steven Spielberg, Ron Howard, Lucasfilm, Amblin Documentaries, Imagine Documentaries & Nedland Films. The film premiered at the AFI Film Festival and also received the Best Music Documentary Award from the Critics' Choice Awards. The Grammy Award got Steven Spielberg his EGOT status.

Bouzereau is the director and co-producer of Jaws @ 50: The Definitive Inside Story (2025), produced by NatGeo, Amblin Documentaries & Nedland Films. The film received a 2026 EMMY (News & Documentary) nomination for Outstanding Arts & Culture Documentary. He directed and co-produced Faye, about actress Faye Dunaway, which premiered at the Cannes Film Festival and was released on HBO and Max in 2024. His other films include Becoming Hitchcock: The Legacy of Blackmail for StudioCanal which premiered at the 2024 Lumière Film Festival,Timeless Heroes: Indiana Jones & Harrison Ford for Lucasfilm / Disney+ and the HBO feature-length documentary Mama's Boy, based on the best-selling memoir by Dustin Lance Black. The film was produced by LD Entertainment, Amblin Television, Playtone and Nedland Media and opened the 2022 NewFest - LGBTQ+ Film and Media festival. Bouzereau is also the director / co-producer of Natalie Wood: What Remains Behind, for HBO and Amblin Television. The film was selected at the 2020 Sundance Film Festival and presented in the Documentary Premiere selection. He directed and co-produced the acclaimed Netflix series Five Came Back, executive produced by Steven Spielberg and Amblin Television, based on the best-selling book by Mark Harris, with an Emmy-winning narration by Meryl Streep. The documentary features Francis Ford Coppola, Guillermo del Toro, Paul Greengrass, Lawrence Kasdan, and Steven Spielberg.

Bouzereau was born and raised in a suburb of Paris, France. He began his career in New York as a freelance journalist and author with The De Palma Cut while working in publicity and promotion for the independent distribution company Spectrafilm. Upon moving to Hollywood, he was a story editor and graduated to director of development for Bette Midler's production company, All Girl Productions. He got his start in home entertainment when he recorded audio commentary for the Criterion Collection on the LaserDisc for Carrie in 1991. In 1995, he directed and produced his first of many documentaries for Steven Spielberg when he was asked to work on the LaserDisc restoration of the film 1941. That year he also directed and produced The Making of Steven Spielberg's 'Jaws', a feature-length documentary that was included on the LaserDisc release of Jaws in 1995, and later on the DVD and Blu-ray releases of the film. Following the success of this documentary, Bouzereau continued to direct and produce retrospective documentaries for Laserdisc, including the making of Scarface and E.T.: The Extra Terrestrial in 1996, the making of Psycho in 1997 and the making of Close Encounters of the Third Kind in 1998. In 2002, for the production of A.I. Artificial Intelligence, he began documenting the filmmaking process on-set.

Bouzereau has directed and produced documentaries on the making-of some of the biggest films in the history of cinema, by some of the most acclaimed directors of all-time. He has directed and produced most of the documentaries on the making of Steven Spielberg's films. In total, he has documented over 150 films, including the Indiana Jones and Jurassic Park film franchises. Among the many titles include American Graffiti by George Lucas, Titanic and Avatar by James Cameron, Universal and Warners Bros. Alfred Hitchcock collections, Lawrence of Arabia and The Bridge on the River Kwai by David Lean, Taxi Driver, Raging Bull and Casino by Martin Scorsese, Scarface, Carrie, and Dressed to Kill by Brian De Palma, Cruising and The Exorcist by William Friedkin, Back to the Future by Robert Zemeckis, Reds by Warren Beatty, Chinatown and Tess by Roman Polanski, and The Last Picture Show by Peter Bogdanovich.

As an author, Bouzereau's credits include Steven Spielberg: The First Ten Years, The De Palma Decade, West Side Story: The Making of the Steven Spielberg Film, Hitchcock: Piece by Piece, The Art of Bond, The New York Times Best-Seller The Making of Star Wars, Episode I – The Phantom Menace, Star Wars: The Annotated Screenplays, The Cutting Room Floor: Movie Scenes Which Never Made It To The Screen, Ultra Violent Movies: From Sam Peckinpah to Quentin Tarantino, and The De Palma Cut: The Films of America's Most Controversial Director.

Bouzereau wrote, directed and produced the documentary on legendary film producer Richard D. Zanuck entitled Don't Say No Until I Finish Talking, executive produced by Steven Spielberg. Zanuck watched the film three days before he died. He also wrote, directed and produced the TCM/Amblin Television series A Night at the Movies. Episodes include George Lucas and the World of Fantasy Cinema, The Horrors of Stephen King, Hollywood Goes to Washington, The Gigantic World of Epics, The Suspenseful World of Thrillers, Merry Christmas!, and Cops & Robbers and Crime Writers.

== Filmography ==
=== Documentaries ===
- Don't Say No Until I Finish Talking: The Story of Richard D. Zanuck (2013)
- The Secrets of The Force Awakens (2015)
- Five Came Back (2017)
- Natalie Wood: What Remains Behind (2020)
- Mama's Boy (2022)
- Timeless Heroes: Indiana Jones & Harrison Ford (2023)
- Becoming Hitchcock: The Legacy of Blackmail (2024)
- Faye (2024)
- Music by John Williams (2024)
- Jaws @ 50: The Definitive Inside Story (2025)

=== Television ===
- A Night at the Movies: The Gigantic World of Epics (2009)
- A Night at the Movies: The Suspenseful World of Thrillers (2009)
- A Night at the Movies: The Horrors of Stephen King (2011)
- A Night at the Movies: Merry Christmas! (2011)
- A Night at the Movies: Hollywood Goes To Washington (2012)
- A Night at the Movies: Cops & Robbers and Crime Writers (2013)
- A Night at the Movies: George Lucas and the World of Fantasy Cinema (2014)

=== Behind-the-Scenes Documentaries (selected titles) ===
Steven Spielberg

- Disclosure Day
- West Side Story (2021)
- The Fabelmans
- Duel
- Jaws
- Close Encounters of the Third Kind
- 1941
- Raiders of the Lost Ark
- Indiana Jones and the Temple of Doom
- Indiana Jones and the Last Crusade
- Indiana Jones and the Kingdom of the Crystal Skull
- E.T. the Extra-Terrestrial
- The Color Purple
- Jurassic Park
- The Lost World: Jurassic Park
- Saving Private Ryan
- A.I. Artificial Intelligence
- Minority Report
- Catch Me If You Can
- The Terminal
- War of the Worlds
- Munich
- The Adventures of Tintin
- War Horse
- Lincoln
- Bridge of Spies
- The BFG
- The Post
- Ready Player One

Alfred Hitchcock

- Blackmail
- Foreign Correspondent
- Suspicion
- Shadow of a Doubt
- Rope
- Stage Fright
- Strangers on a Train
- I Confess
- Dial M for Murder
- Rear Window
- To Catch a Thief
- The Trouble with Harry
- The Man Who Knew Too Much
- The Wrong Man
- Psycho
- The Birds
- Marnie
- Torn Curtain
- Topaz
- Frenzy
- Family Plot
- Alfred Hitchcock Presents

David Lean

- The Bridge on the River Kwai
- Lawrence of Arabia
- Doctor Zhivago
- Ryan's Daughter

Brian de Palma

- Carrie
- Obsession
- Dressed to Kill
- Scarface
- Body Double
- The Untouchables
- Casualties of War
- Carlito's Way
- Femme Fatale
- The Black Dahlia

William Friedkin

- The Exorcist
- Cruising
- The Boys in the Band
- Bug

Martin Scorsese

- Taxi Driver
- Raging Bull
- Cape Fear
- Casino

Robert Zemeckis

- Back to the Future

Sidney Lumet

- Serpico
- Dog Day Afternoon
- Murder on the Orient Express
- Network
- Prince of the City

Peter Bogdanovich

- Targets
- The Last Picture Show
- Paper Moon
- Daisy Miller

François Truffaut

- Fahrenheit 451
- Day for Night

Francis Ford Coppola

- The Godfather Collection

Roman Polanski

- Chinatown
- Tess
- Oliver Twist
- The Ghost Writer

Walter Hill

- The Warriors

Warren Beatty

- Reds

Arthur Penn

- Bonnie and Clyde

Cecil B. DeMille

- The Ten Commandments

William Wyler

- Ben-Hur

John Boorman

- Deliverance

Lawrence Kasdan

- The Big Chill
- Silverado
- Body Heat
- Dreamcatcher

George Lucas

- American Graffiti

Elia Kazan

- A Streetcar Named Desire

John Carpenter

- Christine

David Cronenberg

- The Dead Zone

Orson Welles

- The Lady from Shanghai
- Touch of Evil

John Millus

- Conan the Barbarian

Mel Brooks

- The Producers

Robert Wise

- The Andromeda Strain

Jeannot Szwarc

- Somewhere in Time

James Bridges

- The China Syndrome

Joe Dante

- Gremlins

Mel Gibson

- Braveheart

Gary Ross

- Seabiscuit

Terrence Malick

- The Tree of Life

Sean Penn

- Into the Wild

Steve McQueen

- 12 Years a Slave

Lasse Hallström

- The Hundred-Foot Journey

Sam Taylor Johnson

- Fifty Shades of Grey

Colin Trevorrow

- Jurassic World

J.J. Abrams

- Star Wars: The Force Awakens

Rupert Sanders

- Ghost in the Shell (2017)

Matt Reeves

- War for the Planet of the Apes

Kenneth Branagh

- Murder on the Orient Express (2017)
- Death on the Nile (2022)
- A Haunting in Venice (2023)

J.A. Bayona

- Jurassic World: Fallen Kingdom

James Gray

- Ad Astra

Felix Van Groeningen

- Beautiful Boy

Mike Flanagan

- Doctor Sleep (2019)

Miguel Sapochnik

- Finch

André Øvredal

- The Last Voyage of the Demeter

Wes Ball

- Kingdom of the Planet of the Apes

== Bibliography ==
- The De Palma Cut: The Film of America's Most Controversial Director (1988)
- The Alfred Hitchcock Quote Book (1993)
- The Cutting Room Floor: Movie Scenes Which Never Made It To The Screen (1994) ISBN 978-0806514918
- Ultraviolent Movies: From Sam Peckinpah to Quentin Tarantino (1996)
- Star Wars: The Annotated Screenplays (1997)
- The Making of Star Wars, Episode I – The Phantom Menace (1999) (Co-author with Jody Duncan)
- E.T.: The Extra-Terrestrial: From Concept to Classic (2002) (Contributor)
- Alma Hitchcock: The Woman Behind The Man (2003) (Co-author with Pat Hitchcock O'Connell)
- The Art of Bond: From Storyboard to Screen (2006)
- The Complete Making of Indiana Jones: The Definitive Story Behind All Four Films (2008) (Co-author with J.W. Rinzler)
- Hitchcock, Piece By Piece (2010)
- Steven Spielberg's War Horse (2011) (Contributor)
- Lincoln, A Steven Spielberg Film: A Cinematic and Historical Companion (2012) (Contributor)
- West Side Story: The Making of the Steven Spielberg Film (2021)
- Spielberg: The First Ten Years (2023)
- The De Palma Decade (2024)

== Awards ==
Year	Award	Category
2026	Nominated, News & Documentary Emmy Awards for Outstanding Arts and Culture Documentary, Jaws @ 50: The Definitive Inside Story	News & Documentary Emmy Awards
2026	Grammy Award for Best Music Film, Music by John Williams	Grammy Awards
2025	International Film Music Critics Association (IFMCA) – Kyle Renick Special Award, Music by John Williams	International Film Music Critics Association Awards
2025	Primetime Emmy Award for Outstanding Sound Editing for a Nonfiction or Reality Program, Music by John Williams	Primetime Emmy Awards
2025	Best Sound, Feature Documentary: Music by John Williams	Cinema Audio Society Awards
2025	Outstanding Achievement in Music Editing, Documentary: Music by John Williams	Golden Reel Awards
2024	Best Music Documentary: Music by John Williams	Critics' Choice Documentary Awards
2024	Nominated, Best Documentary Feature: Music by John Williams	Critics' Choice Documentary Awards
2024	Outstanding Achievement in Documentary Filmmaking: Music by John Williams	Newport Beach Film Festival
2024	Nominated, Best Documentary: Music by John Williams	Washington DC Area Film Critics Association Awards
2024	Nominated, Best Documentary Film: Music by John Williams	St. Louis FIlm Critics Association, US
2024	Nominated, Best Documentary: Music by John Williams	San Diego Film Critics Society Awards
2024	Nominated, Best Documentary: Music by John Williams	Michigan Movie Critics Guild Awards
2024	Nominated, Best Music Documentary/Special Program: Music by John Williams	Hollywood Music In Media Awards
2024	Nominated, Astra Award Best Documentary Feature: Music by John Williams	Astra Film Awards
2024	Nominated, Golden Eye: Faye	Cannes Film Festival
2024	Nominated, Best Variety, Nonfiction, or Reality Program: Faye	Online Film & Television Association
2023	Nominated, Best LGBTQ Documentary or Documentary Series: Mama's Boy	Dorian TV Awards
2023	Nominated, Outstanding Documentary: Mama's Boy	GLAAD Media Awards
2023	Nominated, Documentary: Mama's Boy	The Queerties
2020	Nominated, Best Historical/Biographical Documentary: Natalie Wood: What Remains Behind	Critics' Choice Documentary Awards
2018	Best Edited Documentary - Television: Five Came Back "The Price of Victory"	American Cinema Editors, USA
2018	Nominated, Outstanding Achievement in Broadcast Nonfiction Filmmaking: Five Came Back	Cinema Eye Honors Awards, US
2018	Nominated, Outstanding Achievement in Sound Editing - Sound Effects, Foley, Music, Dialogue and ADR for Single Presentation Broadcast Media: Five Came Back	Motion Picture Sound Editors, USA
2017	Nominated, Best Limited Documentary Series (TV/Streaming): Five Came Back	Critics' Choice Documentary Awards
2017	Nominated, Best Documentary (TV Spot/Trailer/Teaser for a series): Five Came Back	Golden Trailer Awards
2017	Nominated, Best Writing of a Reality of Non-Fiction Program: Five Came Back	Online Film & Television Association
2017	Nominated, Best Music in a Non-Series: Five Came Back	Online Film & Television Association
2017	Outstanding Narrator, Meryl Streep: Five Came Back "The Price of Victory"	Primetime Emmy Awards
2017	Nominated, Outstanding Music Composition for a Limited Series, Movie, or Special (Original Dramatic Score): Five Came Back "The Price of Victory"	Primetime Emmy Awards
2014	Silver Key Art Award: 12 Years a Slave documentary for Blu-ray A Historical Portrait	Clio Awards
2008	Best Blu-ray Catalogue Title: Close Encounters of the Third Kind Blu-ray	DVD Critics Awards
2004	The Pioneer Award	DVD Exclusive Awards
2003	Career Achievement Award	F.I.M.O: Festival International du 'Making of'
2001	Best Documentary: The Birds DVD	DVD Exclusive Awards
