= 1941 (film) =

1979 film by Steven Spielberg

- Theatrical release poster
- Directed by: Steven Spielberg
- Screenplay by: Robert Zemeckis; Bob Gale
- Story by: Robert Zemeckis; Bob Gale; John Milius
- Produced by: Buzz Feitshans
- Starring: Dan Aykroyd; Ned Beatty; John Belushi; John Candy; Lorraine Gary; Murray Hamilton; Christopher Lee; Tim Matheson; Toshirō Mifune; Warren Oates; Robert Stack; Treat Williams; Nancy Allen; Eddie Deezen; Bobby Di Cicco; Dianne Kay; Slim Pickens; Wendie Jo Sperber; Lionel Stander; Mickey Rourke
- Cinematography: William A. Fraker
- Edited by: Michael Kahn
- Music by: John Williams
- Color process: Metrocolor
- Production companies: Universal Pictures; Columbia Pictures; A-Team Productions
- Distributed by: Universal Pictures
- Release dates: December 13, 1979 (Cinerama Dome); December 14, 1979 (United States)
- Running time: 118 minutes (theatrical cut); 146 minutes (director's cut)
- Country: United States
- Language: English
- Budget: $35 million
- Box office: $94.9 million

1941 is a 1979 American war comedy film directed by Steven Spielberg and written by Robert Zemeckis and Bob Gale. The film stars an ensemble cast including Dan Aykroyd, Ned Beatty, John Belushi, John Candy, Christopher Lee, Tim Matheson, Toshiro Mifune, Robert Stack, Nancy Allen, and Mickey Rourke in his film debut. The story involves a panic in the Los Angeles area after the December 1941 attack on Pearl Harbor.

Co-writer Gale stated the plot is loosely based on what has come to be known as the Great Los Angeles Air Raid of 1942, as well as the bombardment of the Ellwood oil refinery, near Santa Barbara, by a Japanese submarine. Many other events in the film were based on real incidents, including the Zoot Suit Riots and an incident in which the U.S. Army placed an anti-aircraft gun in a homeowner's yard on the Maine coast.

1941 premiered at the Cinerama Dome on December 13, 1979 and was released on December 14, 1979 by Universal Pictures in North America and by Columbia Pictures in other territories. The film received mixed reviews and was not as financially successful as many of Spielberg's other films, but was still a moderate box office success, grossing $94.9 million against a $35 million budget. It received belated popularity after an expanded version aired on ABC in the 1980s, with subsequent television broadcasts and home video reissues, raising it to cult status.

== Plot ==
Six days after the attack on Pearl Harbor, an Imperial Japanese Navy submarine, commanded by Akiro Mitamura and carrying Kriegsmarine officer Wolfgang von Kleinschmidt, surfaces off the Californian coast. Wanting to destroy something "honorable", Mitamura decides to target Hollywood. Later that morning, a 10th Armored Division M3 Lee tank crew, consisting of Sergeant Frank Tree, Corporal Chuck Sitarski, and Privates Foley, Reese, and Henshaw, are having breakfast at Malcolmb's Café, where dishwasher Wally Stephens and his friend, fry cook Dennis DeSoto, work. Wally plans to enter a dance contest at the Crystal Ballroom that evening with his girlfriend, Betty Douglas. The extremely short-tempered Sitarski deliberately trips him, instigating an angry scuffle. Once the soldiers depart, Wally and Dennis are fired.

As United States Army Air Forces Captain Wild Bill Kelso chaotically searches for Japanese forces in his Curtiss P-40, Major General Joseph W. Stilwell holds a press conference at Daugherty Field in Long Beach, where his aide, Captain Loomis Birkhead, meets his old flame Donna Stratton, Stilwell's new secretary. Aware that she is sexually aroused by airplanes, Birkhead coaxes her into the cockpit of a B-17 bomber. As he unsuccessfully attempts to seduce her he accidentally releases a bomb, which collides with the grandstand and explodes. Stilwell and the crowd escape unhurt.

At the oceanside home of Ward and Joan Douglas in Santa Monica, Betty and her friend Maxine Dexheimer, who have just become USO hostesses, tell Wally that only servicemen are now allowed in the Ballroom. As Wally hides in the garage from Ward, Sgt. Tree arrives with his team and informs the Douglases that an anti-aircraft gun will be installed in their front yard. Wally falls from his hiding spot while Sitarski flirts with Betty, and is ejected by the soldiers into a passing garbage truck.

Lumberjack Hollis "Holly" Wood is captured by a landing party from the Japanese submarine. When the crew discovers a small toy compass in Wood's box of caramel-popcorn, he swallows it. Eager to replace their malfunctioning ship's compass, the Japanese force Wood to drink prune juice to induce the passing of the compass. Wood manages to cause chaos on the submarine and successfully escape.

Ward's neighbor, Angelo Scioli of the Ground Observer Corps, installs his friends Claude Crumm and Herb Kaziminsky in the Ferris wheel at the Ocean Front Amusement Park to scout for enemy aircraft. While General Stilwell attends a screening of Dumbo at a theater in Hollywood, Birkhead drives Donna to the 501st Bomb Disbursement Unit in Barstow, where the mentally unstable Colonel "Mad Man" Maddox lends them a plane. Finally aroused, Donna begins to ravish Birkhead during the flight.

Sitarski drags Betty into the USO dance at the Crystal Ballroom, but she reunites with a disguised Wally to win the Jitterbug contest. Enraged, Sitarski punches Wally, igniting a brawl between soldiers, sailors and zoot suiters. Tree and his team breakup the melee just before anti-aircraft batteries open fire on the unarmed plane carrying Birkhead and Donna. Kelso pursues the plane, and shoots it down, causing it to crash into the La Brea Tar Pits. Claude and Herb then mistake Kelso's passing P-40 for a Japanese Zero and begin firing. Kelso is hit and lands the stricken plane on Hollywood Boulevard. Stilwell arrives and Kelso informs him about the Japanese submarine he spotted off the pier near the amusement park. Wally, wearing sergeant stripes, takes command of the tank once Tree is accidentally knocked silly, and rescues Betty from Sitarski before heading for the pier with Dennis and the tank crew, pursued by Kelso, Sitarski and Maxine, on a motorcycle.

In Santa Monica, Ward begins firing the anti-aircraft gun at the surfaced submarine, consequently wrecking his entire house in the process. The submarine returns fire, hitting the Ferris wheel, which rolls down the pier and into the ocean. When Kleinschmidt demands they submerge, Mitamura throws him overboard. The tank arrives on the pier and fires at the sub; the sub fires, destroying the pier, sending the tank and crew into the ocean. Kelso, having driven the motorcycle off of the pier, jumps and swims to the sub where he's captured by the Japanese and demands he be taken to Tokyo. Deeming the mission an honorable success, Mitamura departs. The next morning, Stilwell arrives with soldiers at the damaged Douglas residence, where the other protagonists have gathered. Ward symbolically nails a Christmas wreath to his front door, causing the remains of his damaged house to collapse down the hillside. Stilwell, observing the disheveled crowd arguing and fighting, informs Sergeant Tree, "It's going to be a long war."

== Cast ==
- Dan Aykroyd as Motor Sergeant Frank Tree
- Ned Beatty as Ward Douglas
- John Belushi as Captain Wild Bill Kelso
- Lorraine Gary as Joan Douglas
- Murray Hamilton as Claude Crumn
- Christopher Lee as Captain Wolfgang Von Kleinschmidt
- Tim Matheson as Captain Loomis Birkhead
- Toshiro Mifune as Commander Akiro Mitamura
- Warren Oates as Colonel "Madman" Maddox
- Robert Stack as Major General Joseph W. Stilwell
- Treat Williams as Corporal Chuck Sitarski
- Nancy Allen as Donna Stratton
- Bobby Di Cicco as Wally Stephens
- Eddie Deezen as Herbie Kazlminsky
- Walter Olkewicz as Private Hinshaw
- Dianne Kay as Betty Douglas
- Slim Pickens as Hollis P. Wood
- Kerry Sherman as USO Girl
- Wendie Jo Sperber as Maxine Dexheimer
- John Candy as Private First Class Foley
- John Voldstad as USO Nerd
- Perry Lang as Dennis DeSoto
- Geno Silva as Martinez
- Patti LuPone as Lydia Hedberg
- Whitney Rydbeck as Daffy
- Penny Marshall as Miss Fitzroy
- Lucinda Dooling as Lucinda
- Frank McRae as Private Ogden Johnson Jones
- Steven Mond as Gus Douglas
- Dub Taylor as Mr. Malcomb
- Luis Contreras as Zoot Suiter
- Lionel Stander as Angelo Scioli
- Michael McKean as Willy
- Susan Backlinie as Polar Bear Woman
- David Lander as Joe
- Joe Flaherty as Sal Stewart / Raoul Lipschitz
- Don Calfa as Telephone Operator
- Ignatius Wolfington as Meyer Mishkin
- Lucille Benson as Gas Mama
- Elisha Cook Jr. as The Patron
- Hiroshi Shimizu as Lieutenant Ito
- Rita Taggart as Reporter
- Maureen Teefy as USO Girl
- Akio Mitamura as Ashimoto
- Mickey Rourke as Private Reese
- Samuel Fuller as Commander Hawkins
- Audrey Landers as USO Girl
- John Landis as Mizeraney
- Dick Miller as Officer Miller
- Donovan Scott as Kid Sailor
- Andy Tennant as Babyface
- Jack Thibeau as Lieutenant Reiner
- Jerry Hardin as Map Man
- Robert Houston as Corporal Taylor
- James Caan as Fighting Sailor (Uncredited)
- Sydney Lassick as Salesman (Uncredited)
- Debbie Rothstein as USO Girl, Jitterbugger (Uncredited)

== Production ==
According to Steven Spielberg's appearance in the documentary Stanley Kubrick: A Life in Pictures, Stanley Kubrick suggested that 1941 should have been marketed as a drama rather than a comedy film. The chaos of the events following the Pearl Harbor attack in 1941 is summarized by Dan Aykroyd's character Sgt. Tree who repeatedly states, 'If there's one thing I can't stand seeing, it's Americans fighting Americans".

Robert Zemeckis originally pitched the concept to John Milius as a serious depiction of the real-life 1942 Japanese bombardment of Ellwood, California; the subsequent false alarm of a Japanese air raid on Los Angeles; and the 1943 Zoot Suit Riots, titled The Night the Japs Attacked. After development of the film transferred from Metro-Goldwyn-Mayer (MGM) to Universal Pictures, executives insisted that the title be changed to Rising Sun to avoid the use of the derogatory term "Jap". The story became a comedy after Steven Spielberg became involved as director, and the script was rewritten during the production of Close Encounters of the Third Kind in 1977. The characters of Claude Crumm and Herb Kaziminsky were originally written with The Honeymooners co-stars Jackie Gleason and Art Carney in mind. Hollis P. "Holly" Wood and "Wild Bill" Kelso were originally minor characters before Belushi and Pickens were cast.

1941 is also notable as one of the few American films featuring popular Japanese actor Toshiro Mifune. It is also the only American film in which Mifune used his own voice in speaking Japanese and English. In his previous movies, Mifune's lines were dubbed in English by Paul Frees.

John Wayne, Charlton Heston, and James Stewart were originally offered the role of Major General Joseph Stilwell, with Wayne still considered for a cameo in the film. After reading the script, Wayne decided not to participate due to ill health, but also urged Spielberg not to pursue the project, as both he and Heston felt the film was unpatriotic. Spielberg recalled, "[Wayne] was really curious and so I sent him the script. He called me the next day and said he felt it was a very un-American movie, and I shouldn't waste my time making it. He said, 'You know, that was an important war, and you're making fun of a war that cost thousands of lives at Pearl Harbor. Don't joke about World War II'." Initially Spielberg wanted Hollywood agent Meyer Mishkin to portray himself, but had to cast Iggie Wolfington because of Screen Actors Guild regulations barring film agents from working as actors.

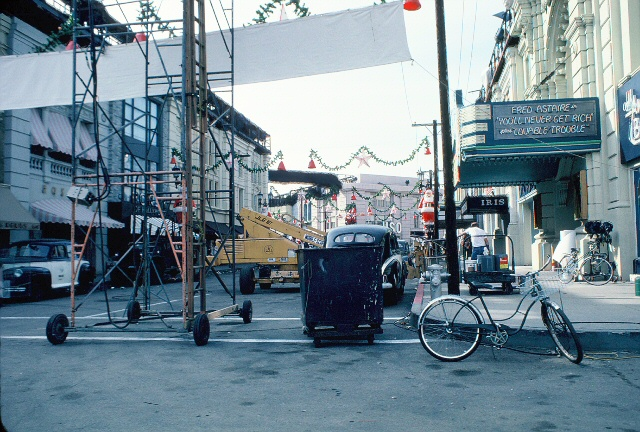
Set for the film at the Warner Bros. Studios Burbank backlot

Susan Backlinie, the first victim in Spielberg's Jaws, appeared as the woman seen swimming nude at the beginning of the film. The gas station that Wild Bill Kelso accidentally blows up early in the film is the same one seen in Spielberg's 1971 television film, Duel, with Lucille Benson appearing as the proprietor in both films. Inadvertent comedic effects ensued when John Belushi, in character as Captain Wild Bill Kelso, unintentionally fell off the wing of his airplane and landed on his head in the scene where Kelso encounters Col. Maddox and his men. It was a real accident and Belushi was hospitalized for several days, but Spielberg left the shot in the movie as it fit Kelso's eccentric character.

During the USO riot scene, when a shore patrolman is tossed into the window of a restaurant from the ladder of a fire engine, Belushi is seen eating spaghetti, in makeup to resemble Marlon Brando in The Godfather, whom he famously parodied in a sketch on Saturday Night Live. Belushi told Spielberg he wanted to appear as a second character and the idea struck Spielberg as humorous. At the beginning of the USO riot, one of the uncredited "extras" dressed as a sailor is actor James Caan. Mickey Rourke makes his first screen appearance in the film as Private First Class Reese of Sgt. Tree's tank group.

The M3 tank Lulu Belle (named after a race horse) and fashioned from a mocked-up tractor, paid homage to its forebear in Humphrey Bogart's 1943 movie Sahara where an authentic M3 named Lulubelle was prominently featured.

Renowned modelmaker Greg Jein (best known for his work in the Star Trek franchise) received his second Academy Award for Best Visual Effects nomination for his work on the film; he would later use the hull number "NCC-1941" for the starship USS Bozeman in the Star Trek: The Next Generation episode "Cause and Effect". Paul De Rolf choreographed the film.

1941 is dedicated to the memory of Charlsie Bryant, a longtime script supervisor at Universal Studios. She had worked on both Jaws and Close Encounters, and would have reprised those duties with this film had she not unexpectedly died.

=== Special effects ===
The Oscar-winning team of L. B. Abbott and A. D. Flowers were in charge of the special effects on 1941. The film is widely recognized for its Academy Award-nominated special-effects laden progressive action and camera sequences. (Note: Quote: "The special effects are beautifully done.")

=== Trailer ===
The advance teaser trailer for 1941, directed by the film's executive producer/co-story writer John Milius, featured narration by Aykroyd as Belushi's character Kelso (here erroneously named "Wild Wayne" and not "Wild Bill"), after landing his plane, gives the viewers a pep-talk encouraging them to join the United States Armed Forces, lest they find one morning that the country has been taken over (for instance, "the street signs will be written in Japanese!").

== Soundtrack ==
The musical score for 1941 was composed and conducted by John Williams, and performed by the Hollywood Studio Symphony. The titular march titled "The March from 1941", composed by Williams, is used throughout the film and is perhaps the most memorable piece written for it. Spielberg has said it is his favorite Williams march. The score also includes a swing composition titled "Swing, Swing, Swing", also composed by Williams. In addition, the score includes a sound-alike version of Glenn Miller's "In the Mood", and two original 1940s recordings by The Andrews Sisters, "Daddy" and "Down by the Ohio". The Irish tune "The Rakes of Mallow", is heard during the riot at the USO.

The LaserDisc and DVD versions of the film have isolated music channels with additional cues not heard on the first soundtrack album.

The 1941 soundtrack album was originally released in 1979 by Arista Records. In 2011, La-La Land Records, in conjunction with Sony Music and NBCUniversal, issued an expanded 2-CD soundtrack of the complete John Williams score as recorded for the film, plus never-before-heard alternative cues, source music, and a remastered version of the original album. Disc One, containing the film score, presents the music as Williams originally conceived based on early cuts of the movie.

== Release ==
The film was previewed at approximately two and a half hours, but Columbia Pictures and Universal Pictures, which both had a major financial investment, felt it was too long to be a blockbuster. The initial theatrical release was edited down to just under two hours, against Spielberg's wishes. Additionally, after a preview screening to investors in Dallas received negative reviews, the release of the film was delayed by a month to allow Spielberg to reedit the first 45 minutes of the film.

The film premiered at the Cinerama Dome in Hollywood on December 13, 1979, before opening to the public the following day.

=== Home media ===
After the success of his 1980 "Special Edition" of Close Encounters of the Third Kind, Spielberg was given permission to create his own "extended cut" of 1941 to represent his original director's cut. This was done for network television (it was only shown on ABC once, but it was seen years later on The Disney Channel). It was first released on VHS and Betamax in 1980 from MCA Videocassette Inc. and from MCA Home Video in 1986 and 1990. A similar extended version (with additional footage and a few subtle changes) was released on LaserDisc in 1995. It included a 101-minute documentary featuring interviews with Spielberg, executive producer John Milius, writers Robert Zemeckis and Bob Gale, editor Michael Kahn, composer John Williams and others involved. This set also included an isolated music score, three theatrical trailers, deleted scenes, photo galleries, and reviews of the movie.

This cut was later released on VHS in 1998, and later on DVD in 1999 and was rereleased on DVD again in May 2002. The DVD includes all features from the 1995 Laserdisc Set. It was released again on DVD in 2000 in a John Belushi box set along with the collector's editions of Animal House and The Blues Brothers.

On October 14, 2014, Universal Studios Home Entertainment released 1941 on Blu-ray as part of their Steven Spielberg's Director's Collection box set. The disc features both the theatrical (118 minutes) and extended version (146 minutes) of the film, a documentary of the making of the film, production photographs (carried over from the LaserDisc collector's edition), and theatrical trailers, although the isolated score that was included on the Laserdisc and DVD releases is not present on the Blu-ray. The standalone Blu-ray version was released on May 5, 2015.

=== Comics adaptation ===
Heavy Metal and Arrow Books produced a magazine-sized comics tie-in to the film, by Allen Asherman, Stephen R. Bissette, and Rick Veitch, which rather than being a straight adaptation, varies wildly and humorously from the film. Spielberg wrote the book's introduction.

== Reception ==
=== Box office ===
"It is down in the history books as a big flop, but it wasn't a flop. The movie didn't make the kind of money that Steven's other movies, Steven's most successful movies have made, obviously. But the movie was by no means a flop. And both Universal and Columbia have come out of it just fine."

— Bob Gale

During its theatrical run, 1941 earned $23.4 million in theatrical rentals from the United States and Canada. Because 1941 grossed significantly less than Jaws and Close Encounters of the Third Kind, the film has been erroneously thought to be a box office disaster, but in actuality, 1941 grossed $90 million worldwide and returned a profit, making it a success.

=== Critical reaction ===
Gene Siskel of the Chicago Tribune gave the film two and a half out of four stars and applauded the film's visual effects, but stated "[T]here is so much flab here, including endless fistfights and huge dance production numbers that become meaningless after a few minutes." In his review for The New York Times, Vincent Canby wrote "There are too many characters who aren't immediately comic. There are too many simultaneous actions that necessitate a lot of cross-cutting, and cross-cutting between unrelated anecdotes can kill a laugh faster than a yawn. Everything is too big...The slapstick gags, obviously choreographed with extreme care, do not build to boffs; they simply go on too long. I'm not sure if it's the fault of the director or of the editor, but I've seldom seen a comedy more ineptly timed." Similarly, Variety labeled the movie as "long on spectacle, but short on comedy," further stating that "1941 suffers from Spielberg's infatuation with physical comedy, even when the gags involve tanks, planes and submarines, rather than the usual stuff of screen hijinks. Pic is so overstuffed with visual humor of a rather monstrous nature that feeling emerges, once you've seen 10 explosions, you've seen them all."

Roger Ebert of the Chicago Sun-Times gave the film one and a half stars out of four, writing that the film "feels forced together chaotically, as if the editors wanted to keep the material moving at any cost. The movie finally reduces itself to an assault on our eyes and ears, a nonstop series of climaxes, screams, explosions, double-takes, sight gags, and ethnic jokes that's finally just not very funny." He labeled the film's central problem as having been "never thought through on a basic level of character and story." Charles Champlin, reviewing for the Los Angeles Times, commented "If 1941 is angering (and you may well suspect that it is), it is because the film seems merely an expensive indulgence, begat by those who know how to say it, if only they had something to say." Dave Kehr of The Chicago Reader called it "a chattering wind-up toy of a movie [that] blows its spring early on. The characters are so crudely drawn that the film seems to have no human base whatsoever...the people in it are unremittingly foolish, and the physical comedy quickly degenerates into childish destructiveness."

Years later, the film would be re-appraised by critics like Richard Brody of The New Yorker, who claimed it was "the movie in which [Spielberg] came nearest to cutting loose" and "the only movie where he tried to go past where he knew he could...its failure, combined with his need for success, inhibited him maybe definitively." Jonathan Rosenbaum of The Chicago Reader would hail 1941 as Spielberg's best film until 2001's A.I. Artificial Intelligence, writing that he was impressed by the virtuosity of 1941 and argued that its "honest mean-spiritedness and teenage irreverence" struck him as "closer to Spielberg's soul" than more popular and celebrated works like E.T. the Extra-Terrestrial and The Color Purple.

According to Jack Nicholson, director Stanley Kubrick allegedly told Spielberg that 1941 was "great, but not funny." Spielberg joked at one point that he considered converting 1941 into a musical halfway into production and mused that "in retrospect, that might have helped." In a 1990 interview with British film pundit Barry Norman, Spielberg admitted that the mixed reception to 1941 was one of the biggest lessons of his career, citing personal arrogance that had gotten in the way after the runaway success of Jaws and Close Encounters of the Third Kind. He also regretted not ceding control of 1941's action and miniature sequences (such as the Ferris wheel collapse in the film's finale) to second unit directors and model units, something which he would do in his next film, Raiders of the Lost Ark. He also said "Some people think that was an out-of-control production, but it wasn't. What happened on the screen was pretty out of control, but the production was pretty much in control. I don't dislike the movie at all. I'm not embarrassed by it — I just think that it wasn't funny enough."

On the review aggregator website Rotten Tomatoes, the film received an approval rating of 39%, based on 28 reviews, with an average rating of 5/10. The critical consensus reads, "Steven Spielberg's attempt at screwball comedy collapses under a glut of ideas, confusing an unwieldy scope for a commensurate amount of guffaws." On Metacritic, the film has a weighted average score of 34 out of 100, based on 7 critics, indicating "generally unfavorable" reviews. Audiences polled by CinemaScore gave the film an average grade of "B" on an A+ to F scale.

== Accolades ==
The film received three nominations at the 1980 Academy Awards.

Award	Category	Nominee(s)	Result
Academy Awards	Best Cinematography	William A. Fraker	Nominated
Academy Awards	Best Sound	Robert Knudson, Robert Glass, Don MacDougall and Gene S. Cantamessa	Nominated
Academy Awards	Best Visual Effects	William A. Fraker, A. D. Flowers and Gregory Jein	Nominated

American Film Institute nominated the film in AFI's 100 Years...Laughs.

== Works cited ==
- Bonham, Joseph; Kay, Joe, eds. (1979). "Bombs Awaayyy!!! The Official 1941 Magazine". New York: Starlog Press.
- Bonham, Joseph; Kay, Joe, eds. (1979). "1941: The Poster Book". New York: Starlog Press.
- "Steven Spielberg: The Collector's Edition". Empire. 2004.
- Clarke, James (2004). Steven Spielberg. London: Pocket Essentials. ISBN 1904048293.
- Culhane, John (1981). Special Effects in the Movies: How They Do it. New York: Ballantine Books. ISBN 0345286065.
- Crawley, Tony (1983). The Steven Spielberg Story. New York: William Morrow. ISBN 0688025102.
- Dolan Jr., Edward F. (1985). Hollywood Goes to War. London: Bison Books. ISBN 0861242297.
- Erickson, Glenn; Trainor, Mary Ellen (1980). The Making of 1941. New York: Ballantine Books. ISBN 0345289242.
- Freer, Ian (2001). The Complete Spielberg. New York: Virgin Books. ISBN 0753505568.
- Heard, Christopher (2006). Mickey Rourke: High and Low. Medford, New Jersey: Plexus Publishing. ISBN 9780859653862.
- McBride, Joseph (2011). Steven Spielberg: A Biography (2nd ed.). Jackson, Mississippi: University Press of Mississippi. ISBN 9781604738360.
- Sinyard, Neil (1986). The Films of Steven Spielberg. London: Bison Books. ISBN 0861243528.
- "Review of 1941". Time Out New York. 1979. Archived from the original on December 21, 2007.
