= Jaws at 50: The Definitive Inside Story =

Jaws @ 50: The Definitive Inside Story
- Film poster
- Directed by: Laurent Bouzereau
- Produced by: Laurent Bouzereau; Wendy Benchley; Laura A. Bowling; Darryl Frank; Markus Keith
- Edited by: Jason Summers
- Music by: Blake Neely
- Production companies: Universal Content Productions; Amblin Documentaries
- Distributed by: Disney+ Hulu
- Release dates: June 17, 2025 (4K Blu-ray); July 10, 2025 (National Geographic)
- Running time: 88 minutes
- Country: United States
- Language: English

Jaws @ 50: The Definitive Inside Story is a 2025 American documentary film about Steven Spielberg's 1975 film Jaws. The documentary is produced and directed by Laurent Bouzereau. It premiered on National Geographic on July 10, 2025, and was released on Disney+ and Hulu on July 11.

== Reception ==
On the review aggregator website Rotten Tomatoes, 100% of 25 critics' reviews are positive, with an average rating of 7.5/10. Metacritic, which uses a weighted average, assigned the film a score of 70 out of 100, based on five critics, indicating "generally favorable" reviews.

== Home media ==
The film was released on June 17, 2025, as a bonus feature on the 50th anniversary 4K Blu-ray of Jaws.
