= The Woman's Hour =

2018 non-fiction book

The Woman's Hour: The Great Fight to Win the Vote
- First edition
- Author: Elaine Weiss
- Language: English
- Publisher: Penguin Books
- Publication date: 2018
- ISBN: 9780143128991
- OCLC: 1043210412

The Woman's Hour: The Great Fight to Win the Vote by Elaine Weiss is a 2018 non-fiction book about women's suffrage in the United States.

== Announced television adaptation ==
The rights to produce an adaptation of the book were optioned by Amblin Partners, a media company owned by Steven Spielberg. In mid-2018, it was announced that former Hillary Clinton (former U.S. secretary of state and 2016 presidential nominee) would serve as an executive producer of a television adaptation to be produced by Amblin Television. Plans were for the program to be carried by either a premium cable channel or a streaming media service. In October 2020, it was announced that the series would air on The CW. It was also announced that it would be executive produced by both Weiss and Clinton, as well as Darryl Frank and Justin Falvey of Amblin Television. It was also announced that the production would be overseen by Angelina Burnett. As of 2024, the series had not yet been filmed.
