= Natalie Wood: What Remains Behind =

- Poster
- Directed by: Laurent Bouzereau
- Produced by: Laurent Bouzereau; Manoah Bowman; Natasha Gregson Wagner
- Cinematography: Sean Hill; Travers Jacobs; Toby Thiermann; Steven Wacks
- Edited by: Jason Summers
- Music by: Jeremy Turner
- Production companies: Nedland Media; Amblin Television; HBO Documentary Films
- Distributed by: HBO Max
- Release dates: January 27, 2020 (Sundance); May 5, 2020 (HBO Max)
- Running time: 100 minutes
- Country: United States
- Language: English

Natalie Wood: What Remains Behind is a 2020 American documentary film about the life and career of actress Natalie Wood. It is directed by Laurent Bouzereau and produced by Nedland Media, Amblin Television, and HBO Documentary Films. Producers include Bouzereau, Manoah Bowman, and Wood's daughter Natasha Gregson Wagner. The film premiered at the 2020 Sundance Film Festival. It also premiered on HBO Max on May 5, 2020, and is available to stream on Hulu and other streaming platforms. It is rated TV-14.

== Appearances ==
- Natalie Wood (archive footage)
- Natasha Gregson Wagner – Daughter
- Julie Salamon – Author, Film Critic
- Robert Redford – Actor, Filmmaker
- Mia Farrow – Actor, Friend
- Courtney Wagner – Daughter of Natalie Wood
- Robert Wagner – Natasha's Stepfather, Actor
- George Hamilton – Actor
- Mart Crowley – Playwright, Friend
- David Niven Jr. – Producer, Friend
- Katie Wagner – Daughter of Robert J. Wagner
- Richard Gregson – Natasha's Biological Father
- Sarah Gregson – Daughter of Richard Gregson
- Delphine Mann – Friend
- Joshua Donen – Stepson of Robert J. Wagner
- Liz Applegate – Natalie's Personal Assistant 1977–1981
- Peter Hyams – Director, Peeper
- Richard Benjamin – Actor, Friend
- John Irvin – Filmmaker
- Alice Emmy Price – Natalie's Childhood friend
- Michael Childers – Photographer, Friend
- Alan Nierob – Publicist
- Dyan Cannon – Actor
- Elliott Gould – Actor
- Tonya Crowe – Actor
- George Segal – Actor
- Douglas Trumbull – Director, Brainstorm
- Julia Gregson – Wife of Richard Gregson
- Jill St. John – Wife of Robert J. Wagner, Actor

== Critical response ==
On the review aggregator website Rotten Tomatoes, 74% of 34 critics' reviews are positive. The website's consensus reads: "Though it sheds little new light on the case, What Remains Behind paints a loving portrait of a starlet and mother gone too soon." Metacritic, which uses a weighted average, assigned the film a score of 65 out of 100, based on nine critics, indicating "generally favorable" reviews.

Some reviewers, including those from The New Yorker, The Guardian and CNN, noted Wood's conflicted psyche and the paradox of her death. Others, including Vanity Fair and the Los Angeles Times, felt the documentary's primary focus was to quell rumors that Wood's widower Robert Wagner was involved in her death.
