= Faye (film) =

- Film poster
- Directed by: Laurent Bouzereau
- Produced by: Laurent Bouzereau; Markus Keith; Darryl Frank; Justin Falvey
- Cinematography: Travers Jacobs; Chris Johnson; Toby Thiermann
- Edited by: Jason Summers
- Music by: Tyler Strickland
- Production companies: HBO Documentary Films; Amblin Documentaries; Nedland Media
- Distributed by: HBO
- Release dates: May 15, 2024 (Cannes); July 13, 2024 (HBO)
- Running time: 91 minutes
- Country: United States
- Language: English

Faye is a 2024 American documentary film, directed and produced by Laurent Bouzereau. It explores the life and career of actress Faye Dunaway.

It had its world premiere at the Cannes Film Festival on May 15, 2024, in the Cannes Classics section. The documentary premiered on HBO and Max on July 13, 2024.

== Premise ==
The film explores the life and career of Faye Dunaway. Dunaway also for the first time reveals her bipolar disorder diagnosis and discusses her reputation for being "difficult". Actors Sharon Stone and Mickey Rourke, director James Gray, and son Liam Dunaway O’Neill, also appear.

== Production ==
Director Laurent Bouzereau, a fan of Dunaway's, was friends with her son, Liam Dunaway O'Neill. The two discussed making a documentary about Dunaway's life and career. It took years of meetings to finally convince Dunaway to do the project.

== Interviews ==
- Faye Dunaway
- Liam Dunaway O'Neill
- Rutanya Alda
- James Gray
- Mark Harris
- Mara Hobel
- Annette Insdorf
- David Itzkoff
- Robin Morgan
- Mickey Rourke
- Jerry Schatzberg
- Sharon Stone

== Release ==
The film had its world premiere at the Cannes Film Festival on May 15, 2024, in the Cannes Classics section. The film debuted on HBO and Max on July 13, 2024.

== Reception ==
On the review aggregator website Rotten Tomatoes, 89% of 36 critics' reviews are positive. The website's consensus reads: "An unapologetic celebration of a hallowed actor renowned for being both brilliant and tempestuous, Faye is a must-watch for fans of the incomparable Dunaway." Metacritic, which uses a weighted average, assigned the film a score of 69 out of 100, based on 8 critics, indicating "generally favorable" reviews.

Pete Hammond of Deadline Hollywood wrote: "You will find yourself with renewed respect for this great star after watching this film on her life... I found myself wanting to watch many of her films all over again." Kevin Maher of The Times gave the film four out of five stars, calling it a "must-see".
