= Duel (1971 film) =

1971 action thriller film directed by Steven Spielberg

- International theatrical release poster
- Based on: "Duel"; 1971 short story by Richard Matheson
- Written by: Richard Matheson
- Directed by: Steven Spielberg
- Starring: Dennis Weaver
- Composer: Billy Goldenberg
- Country of origin: United States
- Original language: English

Production
- Producer: George Eckstein
- Cinematography: Jack A. Marta
- Editor: Frank Morriss
- Running time: 74 minutes (original); 90 minutes (theatrical)
- Production company: Universal Television
- Budget: $450,000

Original release
- Network: ABC
- Release: November 13, 1971

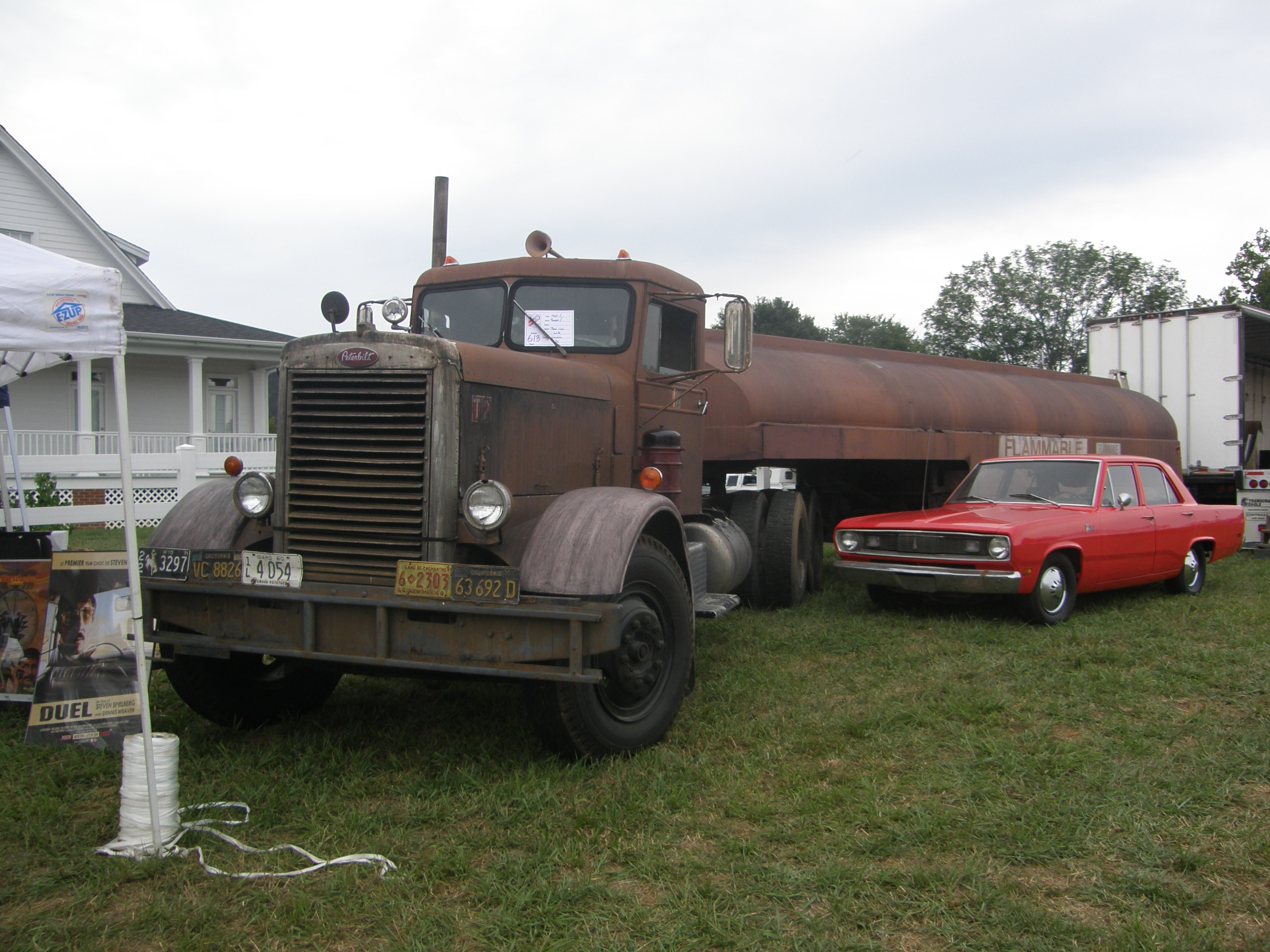
Truck and car, as used in the film

Duel is a 1971 American road action thriller film directed by Steven Spielberg in his feature film debut. It centers on a traveling salesman David Mann (Dennis Weaver) driving his car through rural California to meet a client. However, he finds himself chased and terrorized by the mostly unseen driver of a semi-truck. The screenplay by Richard Matheson adapts his own short story of the same name, published in the April 1971 issue of Playboy, and based on an encounter on November 22, 1963, when a trucker dangerously cut him off on a California freeway.

Produced by Universal Television as a television film, Duel originally aired as a part of the ABC Movie of the Week series on November 13, 1971. It later received an international theatrical release by Universal Pictures (through Cinema International Corporation) in an extended version featuring scenes shot after the film's original TV broadcast. The film received positive reviews from critics, with Spielberg's direction being singled out for praise. It has since been recognized as an influential cult classic and one of the greatest television films ever made.

== Plot ==
David Mann is a middle-aged salesman driving on a business trip. He encounters a dilapidated tanker truck in the Mojave Desert. Mann passes the truck, but the truck roars past him. When Mann overtakes and passes it again, the truck blasts its horn. Mann pulls into a gas station, and shortly after the truck arrives and parks next to him. Mann refuses the station attendant's advice of replacing the radiator hose.

Back on the road, the truck catches up, passes, then blocks Mann whenever he attempts to pass. After antagonizing Mann for some time, the driver waves him past, but Mann nearly hits an oncoming vehicle. He then passes the truck using an unpaved turnout next to the highway. The truck tailgates Mann at increasingly high speeds. Mann crashes into a fence across from a diner. Mann enters the restaurant to compose himself and sees the truck parked outside. He confronts a patron he believes to be the truck driver. The offended patron beats Mann and leaves in a different truck. The pursuing truck leaves seconds later.

Mann resumes his trip and stops to help a stranded school bus, but his front bumper gets caught underneath the bus' rear bumper. The truck appears at the end of a nearby tunnel. Mann flees when the bus driver helps free his car, then stops at a railroad crossing for a freight train. The truck appears from behind and pushes Mann's car into the tracks just as the train clears the intersection. Mann rolls across the tracks and pulls over and the truck continues down the road. Mann slows his pace in hopes the truck will continue on its way, but he encounters it again on the side of the road, waiting for him, and it pulls out in front of him to continue harassing him.

Mann stops at a gas station/roadside animal attraction to call the police and replace his radiator hose. The truck drives into the phone booth and Mann jumps clear, gets into his car, and speeds away. He pulls off the road behind an embankment and the truck drives past. After a long wait, Mann heads off again, but the truck is waiting down the road and chases him up a mountain range. Mann's radiator hose breaks, and the car overheats. He barely makes the summit and rolls downhill with the truck in pursuit. Mann crashes into a cliff wall and barely escapes being crushed by the truck. He managed to limp the car up a dirt road and turns to face the truck in front of a canyon. Mann wedges his briefcase onto the accelerator and steers the car into the oncoming truck, jumping free at the last moment. The truck hits the car, which bursts into flames, and both vehicles plunge over the cliff. Above the canyon, Mann celebrates, then sits at the cliff's edge and throws stones down at the wreckage as the sun sets.

== Cast ==
- Dennis Weaver as David Mann
  - Dale Van Sickel served as Weaver's stunt driver.
- Carey Loftin as Truck Driver
- Jacqueline Scott as Mrs. Mann (Note: Appears only in the extended theatrical version)
- Eddie Firestone as Café Owner
- Lou Frizzell as Bus Driver
- Eugene Dynarski as Man in Café
- Lucille Benson as Lady at Snakerama
- Tim Herbert as Gas Station Attendant
- Charles Seel as Old Man
- Shirley O'Hara as Waitress
- Amy Douglass as Old Woman in Car
- Alexander Lockwood as Old Man in Car
- Sweet Dick Whittington as Radio Interviewer

== Production ==
=== Development ===
Richard Matheson adapted the script from his own short story, which was originally published in the April 1971 issue of Playboy magazine. Matheson got the inspiration for the story when he was tailgated by a trucker while on his way home from a golfing match, on the then two-lane Highway 126 in Fillmore, California, with friend Jerry Sohl on November 22, 1963, the same day as the John F. Kennedy assassination. After a series of attempts to pitch the idea as an episode for various television series, he decided to write it as a short story instead. In preparation for writing the story, he drove from his home to Ventura and recorded everything he saw on a tape recorder.

The original short story was given to Spielberg by his secretary Nona Tyson, who told him that it was being made into a Movie of the Week for ABC with producer George Eckstein, and she suggested he apply to be the director; she told Spielberg to read the story, which he liked. Duel was Spielberg's second feature-length directing effort, after "L.A. 2017", a 1971 episode of the NBC television series The Name of the Game. Spielberg showed Eckstein a rough cut of "Murder by the Book", an episode of Columbo directed by Spielberg that had not yet aired (it aired on September 15, 1971, two months before the release of Duel).

Much of the movie was filmed in and around the communities of Canyon Country, Agua Dulce, and Acton, California. In particular, sequences were filmed on the Sierra Highway, Agua Dulce Canyon Road, Soledad Canyon Road, and Angeles Forest Highway. Spielberg insisted on shooting outside, contrary to the request of unit production manager, Wallace Worsley, who felt that the film could not be shot efficiently on the budget and time provided. As a compromise, he allowed Spielberg to start the filming on location for the first three days to see if it really could be done on an efficient level. To help with plotting, he made an overhead map to help plot out the camera shots. Principal photography began on September 13, 1971. Shooting lasted 13 days. Three more days were needed for additional scenes.

Many of the landmarks from Duel still exist today, including the tunnel, the railroad crossing, and Chuck's Café, where Mann stops for a break. The café building is still on Sierra Highway, but has housed a French restaurant called 'Le Chêne' since 1986. The cliffs where the truck crashes at the end are Mystery Mesa, off Vasquez Canyon Road.

Production of the television film was overseen by ABC's director of movies of the week Lillian Gallo. Filming was completed on October 4, 1971, in thirteen days—three longer than the schedule—which left ten days for editing prior to broadcast.

Spielberg lobbied for Dennis Weaver to star in the movie because he admired Weaver's work in Orson Welles' Touch of Evil.

Interviewed by Weaver for the Archive of American Television, Spielberg said, "You know, I watch that movie at least twice a year to remember what I did".

=== Truck as antagonist ===
Matheson's script made it clear that the truck driver would be unseen aside from the few shots of his arms and boots that were necessary to the plot. Specifically, the driver's arms are shown twice, motioning Mann ahead, and his leather boots are shown in the gas station scene near the beginning of the film. His motives are never revealed. In a DVD documentary feature, Spielberg observes that fear of the unknown is perhaps the greatest fear of all, and Duel plays heavily to that fear; the effect of not seeing the driver makes the real antagonist of the film the truck itself.

=== Vehicles ===
The car driven by Mann is a red Plymouth Valiant. Four cars were used in production. One of those cars was an older 1969 model with a 318 V-8 engine that was modified to look like a 1970 model. It had PLYMOUTH spelled out across the hood (though the brand name was covered with aluminum foil for the movie), as well as a trunk lid treatment characteristic of the 1970 model. This older modified 1969 car was a stunt car that was used to go down the cliff in the final scene of the film. An actual 1970 model and a 1971 model that both had a 225 cu in Slant Six engine were also used. The last car was a 1972 model that also had a 225 Slant Six that was used to shoot the additional scenes for theatrical release in April 1972 and was later seen in "Never Give a Trucker an Even Break", the seventh episode of the Universal television series The Incredible Hulk.

Spielberg did not care what kind of car was used in the film, as long as it was red, which would allow the vehicle to stand out from the landscape in the wide shots of the desert highway.

After viewing a number of trucks for potential use in the film, Spielberg selected the 1957 Peterbilt 281 over the contemporary, flat-nosed, "cab-over" style of truck. The long hood of the older Peterbilt, its split windshield, and its round headlights give it more of a "face", adding to its menacing "personality". Spielberg also said that the multiple license plates on the front bumper of the Peterbilt subtly suggest that the truck driver is a serial killer, having "run down other drivers in other states". As shooting progressed, the truck was made progressively uglier through the addition of oil, grease, fake dead insects and other blemishes.

The truck was manufactured as a single axle, with a Rockwell TK-570 tag-along axle behind it. It had a 260 HP (194 kW) CAT 1673B turbocharged engine with a Fuller RTO-913 single shift 13-speed "Roadranger" transmission, making it capable of hauling loads over 30 tons (27 t) and reaching top speeds of 61–67 mph (98–110 km/h) although in the film it is made to appear to be going faster than it actually was. A single truck was used for the original filming, so the shots of it falling off the cliff and being destroyed had to be completed in one take.

A backup truck—a 1960 Peterbilt 281—was built up for the original filming when the Cat Engine in the original 1957 Peterbilt 281 had begun giving the film production problems during rehearsals. On the last day of filming the backup truck was taken off of the film production, leaving them with only one truck at the time to film the final scene of the film. This truck is the only truck from the film known to survive today. This truck is capable of reaching up to a top speed of 64 mph. The 1960 Peterbilt 281 had originally featured a NHBS 262 HP Cummins Engine with a 5 X 3 twin stick transmission at the time filming had taken place, but has since been repowered with a small cam NTC-350 HP Cummins Engine with a 5 X 3 twin stick transmission and has since had a live tandem put underneath the truck. Another truck was purchased to shoot the additional scenes for theatrical release in April 1972; this truck was a 1962 Peterbilt 351 also with a 260 HP (194 kW) CAT 1673B turbocharged engine and Fuller RTO-913 transmission that was capable of reaching top speeds of 61–65 mph (98–100 km/h); this truck is verified to be long gone today. KW Mudflaps were also visible on this truck at the time of filming.

In 1978, stock footage of both vehicles, along with some new footage of a 1964 Peterbilt 351 truck, was used in "Never Give a Trucker an Even Break", the seventh episode of the Universal television series The Incredible Hulk. This displeased Spielberg, but Universal owned the Duel footage, and could use it as it saw fit.

=== Use of sound ===
Mann has very little dialogue in the movie, and the truck driver has none. As Spielberg stated in a behind-the-scenes documentary, he instead wanted to let the vehicles and setting "speak" for themselves. The film was shot on a tight schedule, based on a short story, and needed to fit within the 75 minutes allotted by ABC; therefore, Spielberg focused on the visuals and menacing audio.

One break from the silences and heavy roar of the vehicles occurs after the initial chase scene, in Chuck's Café. Mann uses the restroom to collect himself and recover from his crash, and the audience is introduced to his inner thoughts. This diegetic use of sound was explained by Spielberg as Mann wanting to "physicalize" and "emote" his feelings, thus giving the audience an intimate relationship with Mann.

The use of sound and silence was a technique used by Spielberg to "keep the audience in suspense" throughout the entirety of the film, which he said was inspired by the work of Alfred Hitchcock. According to Spielberg, "sound has to fit like a glove ... it makes everything scarier". As an example, towards the end of the film, Mann is awakened from sleep by noise similar to that of the truck, creating in the audience the expectation of a major turning point in the movie. The sound is revealed to actually be a passing train.

Along with the natural sounds in the film, Spielberg also incorporated a minimal score.

== Soundtrack ==
The film's original score was composed by Billy Goldenberg, who had previously written music for productions directed by Spielberg, including his segment of the Night Gallery pilot and the Columbo episode "Murder by the Book", as well as scoring "L.A. 2017" with Robert Prince.

Spielberg and Duel producer George Eckstein told Goldenberg that because of the short production schedule, he would have to write the music during filming. He visited the production on location at Soledad Canyon to help get an idea of what would be required. Spielberg had Goldenberg ride in the tanker truck driven by stunt driver Loftin on several occasions. The experience terrified the composer at first, but he would eventually get used to it.

Goldenberg composed the score in about a week, for strings, harp, keyboards and heavy use of percussion instruments, with Moog synthesizer effects, but eschewing brass and woodwinds. He then worked with the music editors to "pick from all the pieces [they] had and cut it together" with the sound effects and dialogue. Much of his score ultimately was not used.

In 2015 Intrada Records released a limited edition album featuring the complete score, plus four radio source music tracks composed by Goldenberg.

== Release ==
Duel was initially shown on American television as an installment of the ABC Movie of the Week. It was the 18th highest-rated television movie of the year, with a Nielsen rating of 20.9, and an audience share of 33%. In his book, 'The Last Kings Of Hollywood', Paul Fischer tells the story of how George Lucas, at a party given by Francis Ford Coppola, wandered away upstairs to a bedroom where he found a TV and switched it on, specifically to watch Duel: "At the first commercial break, he leapt out of his seat and ran down the stairs. 'Francis, you’ve got to come see this movie,' he said. 'This guy’s really good!'"

=== Theatrical version ===
Following Duel's successful broadcast, Universal decided to release the film theatrically. At 74 minutes, however, it was not long enough for this purpose, so Universal had Spielberg spend two days filming several new scenes to expand it to 90 minutes. A longer opening sequence was added with the car backing out of a garage and driving through Los Angeles, and out into the desert. Additional scenes shot to lengthen the movie included Mann's telephone conversation with his wife in the laundromat, the encounter with the broken-down school bus, and the confrontation at the railroad crossing. Some voice over dialogue from the television version was re-written and re-recorded, changing the "tone" of some scenes, and some alternate takes were used as well. Mild expletives were also added to the script, to make the film sound less like a television production.

The full-length film was released in Europe and Australia, and had a limited release in the United States. Duel's success enabled Spielberg to establish himself as a movie director.

== Home media ==
The theatrical version of Duel has been issued on various formats in the US by MCA and its successor Universal, with many other countries having similar releases. It was released on LaserDisc twice; first on MCA's DiscoVision in 1979, and by MCA/Universal Home Video in 1993. It was also released on VHS twice; in 1982 on the MCA Videocassette Inc label, and again in 1990 by MCA/Universal.

Duel was first released on DVD by Universal on August 17, 2004, as a full frame collector's edition. Before that, Duel was originally scheduled for a widescreen collector's edition DVD on May 21, 2002, but was delayed and ultimately unreleased.

The film was released on Blu-ray on October 14, 2014, as part of the eight-film box set Steven Spielberg Director's Collection. It also had a standalone Blu-ray release on May 5, 2015.

A newly scanned 4K release by Universal, including the original TV version, was released on November 17, 2023.

== Reception ==
=== Critical response ===
Duel received highly positive reviews and is considered one of the greatest television films ever made. On the review aggregation website Rotten Tomatoes, Duel has a score of 90% based on 49 reviews. The site's consensus is that "Duel makes brilliant use of its simple premise, serving up rock-solid genre thrills while heralding the arrival of a generational talent behind the lens". In TV (The Book), co-written by television critics Matt Zoller Seitz and Alan Sepinwall, Seitz named Duel as the greatest American television movie of all time, writing, "Almost fifty years after its initial broadcast, this stripped-down, subtly mythic action thriller retains a good deal of its power". A scene made Bravo's The 100 Scariest Movie Moments.

Reviewing the movie's theatrical release in 1983, Janet Maslin wrote that Spielberg "made his mark with a film about a diabolical truck, a subject that would seem to have only limited possibilities. In fact, Mr. Spielberg's 1971 television film Duel took advantage of the very narrowness of its premise, building excitement from the most minimal ingredients and the simplest of situations. The theatrical version of Duel at the Manhattan Twin theater may contain a few extra close-ups of its leading man's nose, but otherwise it works as well on the wide screen as it did on the small one. Even without benefit of hindsight, Duel looks like the work of an unusually talented young director... The vehicles are the real stars of Duel, and whenever the chase is interrupted by the relatively primitive people on hand (at a truck stop and, in one particularly odd sequence, at a gas station run by a woman who keeps pet snakes, spiders and lizards), the film loses its momentum and becomes somewhat clumsy. The ending is abrupt, too, but the main impression left by Duel is one of talent and energy. Mr. Spielberg seemed, with this film, to be headed for bigger and better things. Sure enough, he was."

Leonard Maltin writes that "This TV movie put Spielberg on the map, and rightly so; a superb suspense film." He rates it as "Above average", his highest rating for a TV film. David Thomson writes: "The ordinariness of the Dennis Weaver character and the monstrous malignance of the truck confront one another with a narrative assurance that never needs to remind us of the element of fable. The ending is unsatisfactory, partly because the rest of the film is so momentous, but also because sheer skill needed more philosophy for a fitting resolution." In his overview of the horror genre, Danse Macabre (1981), Stephen King writes that "Duel is a gripping, almost painfully suspenseful rocket ride of a movie; perhaps not Spielberg's best work—that must almost certainly wait for the eighties and nineties—but surely one of the half-dozen best movies ever made for TV." In an appendix, King lists it as one of the best horror films from 1950 to 1980, with an asterisk denoting it as a personal favorite. King and his son Joe Hill paid homage to Duel in their novella Throttle (2009).

William Thomas writes: "Tapping into the hidden terrors on the open road, this originally made for TV opus is consummate storytelling in pictures. Like most early efforts, it overflows with a delight in the potential of movies, but matches it with directorial proficiency and unflagging excitement to match... Despite a clever use of sound effects – the truck's primal groaning contrasting with Mann's whiny engine – Duel achieves the frantic energy and striking simplicity of silent film: ironically, considering its small screen origins, it is pure cinema." Scott Tobias sees the film as a precursor of things to come: "It takes less than a minute of watching Duel, Steven Spielberg's feature-length debut, to realize you're in the hands of a master director." Specifically, he sees it as a precursor to Jaws: "Now 50 years and countless awards, accolades and box-office dollars later, Duel feels like the proto-Jaws, an early statement of principles on how to build suspense and terror through patience, simplified action and delayed gratification. If you want to 'play the audience like a violin', as Alfred Hitchcock once phrased it to François Truffaut, you can't be slashing away at the strings all the time. As an exercise – and it is scarcely (if elegantly) more than that – Duel is proof positive that a truck menacing a car on the California highway is all the story necessary for a film to exist. Provided it has the right director, of course."

Interpretations of Duel often focus on the symbolism of Mann and the truck. Some critics follow Spielberg's own interpretation of the story as an indictment of the mechanization of life, both by literal machines and by social regimentation. The theme of gender performativity in Mann's quest to prove his manhood is another interpretation several observers have suggested.

Over the years, Duel has developed a strong following and a reputation as a cult film. In 2023, filmmaker Denis Villeneuve named it as one of his favorite films of all time, saying "this movie felt like home to me and as the credits rolled I knew that was the way I wanted to live my life."

== Accolades ==
Award	Category	Year	Result	Ref.
Avoriaz Fantastic Film Festival	Grand Prize	1973	Won	
Emmy	Outstanding Achievement in Film Sound Editing	1972	Won	
Emmy	Outstanding Achievement in Cinematography for Entertainment Programming - For a Special or Feature Length Program Made for Television	1972	Nominated	
Golden Globe	Best Movie Made for TV	1972	Nominated	
Saturn Award	Best DVD Classic Film Release	2003	Nominated	

== Aftermath ==
In 2005, 34 years after the original film, Duel was followed by a spin-off sequel, Throttle, featuring a scene with Tom Gillen as David Mann (previously portrayed by Dennis Weaver), driving a red Plymouth Valiant that was repaired from the wreckage.

In 2015, a Kickstarter campaign began to finance a documentary about the making of Duel. The film would be called The Devil on Wheels—a literal translation of the title under which Duel was released in Spain—and be directed by Enric Folch. The project was said to have the approval of NBC and DreamWorks. The website for The Devil on Wheels also collects information about Duel. As of February 2023, The Devil on Wheels was listed as being in post-production.

== Bibliography ==
- Awalt, Steven (March 14, 2014). Steven Spielberg and Duel: The Making of a Film Career. Lanham, Md.: Rowman & Littlefield. ISBN 9780810892613.
- Clarke, James (2004). Steven Spielberg (2nd ed.). Harpenden, England: Pocket Essentials. ISBN 9781904048299.
- Crawley, Tony (1983). The Steven Spielberg Story. New York, N.Y.: William Morrow. ISBN 9780688025106.
- Freer, Ian (2001). The Complete Spielberg. London, England: Virgin Books. ISBN 9780753505564.
- Matheson, Richard (December 5, 2017). Duel: Terror Stories by Richard Matheson. New York, N.Y.: Tor Books. ISBN 9780765399939.
- Resmini, Mauro (2014). Steven Spielberg (in Italian) (1st digital ed.). Milano, Italy: Il Castoro. ISBN 9788880338741.
