= Five Came Back (TV series) =

2017 American documentary miniseries

- Genre: Documentary
- Based on: Five Came Back: A Story of Hollywood and the Second World War by Mark Harris
- Directed by: Laurent Bouzereau
- Starring: Francis Ford Coppola; Guillermo del Toro; Paul Greengrass; Lawrence Kasdan; Steven Spielberg
- Narrated by: Meryl Streep
- Theme music composer: Thomas Newman
- Composer: Jeremy Turner
- Country of origin: United States
- Original language: English
- No. of episodes: 3

Production
- Executive producers: Steven Spielberg; Scott Rudin; Barry Diller; Angus Wall; Justin Falvey; Darryl Frank; Eli Bush; Jason Sack; Linda Carlson; Jason Sterman; Ben Cotner; Adam Del Deo; Lisa Nishimura
- Producers: Laurent Bouzereau; John Battsek
- Editor: Will Znidaric
- Running time: 59-69 minutes
- Production companies: Amblin Television; IACF Productions; Passion Pictures; Rock Paper Scissors Entertainment

Original release
- Network: Netflix
- Release: March 31, 2017

Five Came Back is an American documentary based on the 2014 book Five Came Back: A Story of Hollywood and the Second World War by journalist Mark Harris. It was released as a stand-alone documentary in New York and Los Angeles, and as a three-part series on Netflix, on March 31, 2017.

The documentary focuses on five directors – John Ford, William Wyler, John Huston, Frank Capra, and George Stevens – whose war-related works are analysed by modern filmmakers, respectively Paul Greengrass, Steven Spielberg, Francis Ford Coppola, Guillermo del Toro, and Lawrence Kasdan. The series received critical acclaim and was nominated for two Primetime Emmy Awards, winning Outstanding Narrator for Meryl Streep's performance.

On February 9, 2021 Netflix added all of the propaganda movies featured into a new series called Five Came Back: The Reference Films.

== Synopsis ==
Five Came Back explores the experiences of five U.S. film directors – John Ford, William Wyler, John Huston, Frank Capra, and George Stevens – and their frontline work during the Second World War. It draws on over 100 hours of archival footage and is narrated by Meryl Streep. Each modern director discusses the impact and legacies of one of the five earlier directors: Steven Spielberg (Wyler), Francis Ford Coppola (Huston), Guillermo del Toro (Capra), Paul Greengrass (Ford), and Lawrence Kasdan (Stevens).

- The Battle of Midway (1942, John Ford)
- Prelude to War (1942, Frank Capra)
- The Battle of Russia (1943, Frank Capra)
- Undercover: How to Operate Behind Enemy Lines (1943, John Ford)
- Report from the Aleutians (1943, John Huston)
- The Memphis Belle: A Story of a Flying Fortress (1944, William Wyler)
- The Negro Soldier (1944, Stuart Heisler; produced by Frank Capra)
- Tunisian Victory (1944, John Huston)
- Know Your Enemy: Japan (1945, Frank Capra)
- The Battle of San Pietro (1945, John Huston)
- Nazi Concentration Camps (1945, George Stevens)
- Let There Be Light (1946, John Huston)
- Thunderbolt (1947, William Wyler)

== Production ==
The film was based on the 2014 book of the same name by Mark Harris. The filmmakers studied more than 100 hours of newsreel and archival footage, and more than 40 documentaries and training films created by the five directors during the war. They also reviewed 50 studio films by the directors and more than 30 hours of raw footage from their war films. Director Laurent Bouzereau, who has extensive experience documenting films and directors, introduced the idea of interviewing five current directors for the project.

Meryl Streep recorded the narration for the documentary on January 17, 2017, the same day she received her 20th Oscar nomination (Best Actress for Florence Foster Jenkins).

== Episodes ==
No.	Title	Directed by	Written by	Original release date
1	"The Mission Begins"	Laurent Bouzereau	Mark Harris	March 31, 2017
The series looks at the backgrounds of the five directors as World War II begins and their motives for contributing to the war effort. John Ford's The Battle of Midway was approved directly by President Franklin D. Roosevelt while Frank Capra fights to get Why We Fight made.
2	"Combat Zones"	Laurent Bouzereau	Mark Harris	March 31, 2017
The directors learn their vision for the films is not always permissible by the U.S. government. Wyler is shocked by the racism he encounters against African American soldiers and refused to make a film recruiting black soldiers. Meanwhile, the films' racist depiction of the Japanese versus human depiction of the Germans causes worry for the War Department, which at that time planned to redistribute the Japanese-American population from internment camps into towns across the United States.
3	"The Price of Victory"	Laurent Bouzereau	Mark Harris	March 31, 2017
The five directors return to Hollywood after the war but are forever haunted by what they saw. Ford goes on a drinking bender after filming the carnage at D-Day. Stevens is wholly unprepared for the horrors of Dachau and realizes he is not there to film propaganda but to capture evidence of crimes against humanity. Wyler, who lost his hearing during the war, fears his career is over. Huston chronicles soldiers suffering from posttraumatic stress disorder in the film Let There Be Light, only to have it suppressed by the U.S. government.

== Critical reaction ==
Five Came Back has largely received critical acclaim. It has a 98% approval rating based on 40 reviews on review aggregator Rotten Tomatoes. Peter Travers of Rolling Stone gave the series 3.5 stars out of 4, writing, "Arguably the best documentary ever made about Hollywood and wartime, Five Came Back is nirvana for movie lovers and a real eye-opener for anyone new to the subject." David Sims of The Atlantic praised the series' relevance today, and stated that it should have been longer: "Harris's book recognized that Hollywood often shapes our perception of reality more than we know, and that the recruitment of these directors by the U.S. military intertwined the film industry with sometimes-dangerous assumptions of truth and realism. Five Came Back is, in the end, a compelling examination of propaganda—its purpose, its effectiveness, and its drawbacks. These are all things that are worth keeping in mind in 2017, just as they were many decades ago."

Allison Shoemaker, who reviewed each episode separately for The A.V. Club, gave "The Mission Begins" a B+ and graded both "Combat Zones" and "The Price of Victory" an A. Reviewing the final episode, she writes, "It comes as no surprise that the conclusion to this remarkable series packs a wallop—the previous episode ends with D-Day on the horizon, after all—but what is surprising is how gracefully Laurent Bouzereau and Mark Harris link these monstrous and stunning events and truths to the art which followed them. Does tying Frank Capra's It's a Wonderful Life to George Stevens' experiences at Dachau seem like a bit of a stretch? Sure, but somehow, it isn't. George Bailey's story is also Capra's, and Ford's, and Wyler's. There's much that this hour makes clear, but chief among that crowded group is this: the experiences of and footage captured by these men changed the United States, the world, and the directors themselves in irrevocable ways."

John Anderson in The Wall Street Journal writes: "Overall, the series is much like its story: mythic, adventurous, romantic. And real." Brian Tallerico, writing for RogerEbert.com, called it a "must-see" and a "cinephile and historian's dream come true."

In The New York Times, Ben Kenigsberg writes, "Above all, Five Came Back is an invitation to see more: It's hard to watch it without wanting to visit (or revisit) Wyler's Mrs. Miniver or Ford's They Were Expendable. It's further proof, if any were needed, that these men weren't simply creating propaganda, but art that would endure."

Kristin Hunt of Slashfilm questioned why the series did not address Ford's anti-semitism or Capra's admiration of Benito Mussolini, but was generally positive, writing, "Five Came Back is a testament to the power of cinema, and the moral implications that come with it. Was all this propaganda permissible? The documentary is sometimes afraid to truly grapple with that question. But when it does, it's gripping stuff." Peter Debruge, chief film critic for Variety, was less enthusiastic, criticizing the series for leaving out the rich original research in Harris' book for the thoughts of the five current Hollywood directors, whose purpose he felt was merely a promotional gag.

== Accolades ==
Accolades for Five Came Back
Award	Date of ceremony	Category	Nominee(s)	Result	Ref
American Cinema Editors Eddie Awards	January 26, 2018	Best Edited Non-Theatrical Documentary	Will Znidaric (Episode: "The Price of Victory")	Won	
Cinema Eye Honors	January 11, 2018	Outstanding Achievement in Broadcast Nonfiction Filmmaking	Laurent Bouzereau, director; John Battsek and Laurent Bouzereau, producers; Ben Cotner, Adam Del Deo and Lisa Nishimura, executive producers	Nominated	
Critics' Choice Documentary Awards	November 2, 2017	Best Limited Documentary Series (TV/Streaming)	Five Came Back	Nominated	
Golden Reel Awards	February 18, 2018	Outstanding Achievement in Sound Editing – Single Presentation	Trip Brock, supervising sound editor; Bruce Stubblefield, supervising dialogue editor; Demetri Evdoxiadis, Raymond Park and Zheng Jia, sound effects editors; Abhay Manusmare, music editor	Nominated	
Golden Trailer Awards	June 6, 2017	Best Documentary (TV Spot/Trailer/Teaser for a series)	Five Came Back	Nominated	
Primetime Emmy Awards	September 9–10, 2017	Outstanding Music Composition for a Limited Series, Movie, or Special (Original Dramatic Score)	Jeremy Turner (Episode: "The Price of Victory")	Nominated	
Primetime Emmy Awards	September 9–10, 2017	Outstanding Narrator	Meryl Streep (Episode: "The Price of Victory")	Won	
