= The Dinosaurs (miniseries) =

2026 American documentary series

- Promotional poster
- Genre: Nature documentary
- Showrunner: Dan Tapster
- Directed by: Nick Shoolingin-Jordan (Series Director); Jolyon Sutcliffe; Amber Cherry Eames; Darren Williams
- Narrated by: Morgan Freeman
- Composer: Lorne Balfe
- Country of origin: United States
- Original language: English
- No. of episodes: 4

Production
- Executive producers: Steven Spielberg; Darryl Frank; Justin Falvey; Keith Scholey; Alastair Fothergill
- Producers: Nick Schoolingin-Jordan; Jolyon Sutcliffe; Amber Cherry Eames; Darren Williams
- Running time: 44–48 minutes
- Production companies: Amblin Documentaries; Silverback Films

Original release
- Network: Netflix
- Release: March 6, 2026

Related
- Life on Our Planet

The Dinosaurs is a 2026 American television nature documentary miniseries produced by Amblin Documentaries and Silverback Films. Executive-produced by Steven Spielberg, series directed by Nick Shoolingin-Jordan and narrated by Morgan Freeman, the four-part series focuses on the history of dinosaurs from their appearance in the Triassic period until the demise of non-avian dinosaurs in the Cretaceous–Paleogene extinction event. A successor to Life on Our Planet (2023), the series was released on Netflix on March 6, 2026.

== Production ==
In May 2024, Silverback Films announced that the 'next iteration' of Life on Our Planet would be a four-part miniseries focused on the 'rise and fall of the dinosaurs' spanning 170 million years. The new series would inherit the same production team as Life On Our Planet. The title of the series was revealed in January 2026, and the release date of the series was announced to be in the first quarter of 2026. On February 5, 2026, Netflix released the official trailer for the series, which was marketed as the spiritual successor to Life on Our Planet.

== Episodes ==
No.	Title	Directed by	Original release date
1	"Rise"	Nick Schoolingin-Jordan	March 6, 2026
66 million years ago, at the end of the Mesozoic Era, a male Pachycephalosaurus weaves through a herd of hadrosaurs (Edmontosaurus annectens) and sauropods (Alamosaurus) to get back to a harem of females. In the process, he butts heads with a younger rival male who is then killed by a Tyrannosaurus rex. The story rewinds to the origin of the dinosaurs on the barren supercontinent of Pangea during the Triassic Period, 235 million years ago. Life still thrives on the coast, including strange reptiles such as rhynchosaurs (Hyperodapedon), Tanystropheus, and Luperosuchus. A female hatchling Marasuchus manages to survive despite all odds, ensuring the future of the dinosaur lineage. The Carnian pluvial episode covers Pangea with dense forests, and rhynchosaurs fail to adapt. By 215 million years ago, large herbivorous dinosaurs like Plateosaurus flourish, though carnivores like Procompsognathus are still small and vulnerable. 201 million years ago, a female Liliensternus, a larger carnivore, stalks courting pterosaurs (Caelestiventus) and manages to catch one. Her kill inadvertently attracts a rauisuchian (Smok), but both are caught off guard when the landscape explodes with a massive volcanic eruption.
2	"Conquest"	Jolyon Sutcliffe	March 6, 2026
The land is poisoned by volcanic activity during the end-Triassic mass extinction, but dinosaurs persist. New, highly-specialized dinosaur groups are heralded by Vulcanodon and Heterodontosaurus near the start of the Jurassic Period. A male Dilophosaurus attempts to woo a female, but fails, while trouble is brewing in the sea. Massospondylus suffer through a drought brought on by the Toarcian Oceanic Anoxic Event, 183 million years ago. By 160 million years ago, dinosaur diversity encompasses long-necked giants like Mamenchisaurus, large carnivores like Sinraptor, and the small feathered Anchiornis. 153 million years ago, a pair of Allosaurus, a young male and an older battle-scarred female, come into conflict while scavenging and hunting Stegosaurus.
3	"Empire"	Amber Cherry Eames	March 6, 2026
In the Cretaceous Period, 125 million years ago, the far north is gripped by cold. A herd of sauropods (Dongbeititan) migrate south, only to be ambushed by a male Yutyrannus. As the climate warms back up, a Guidraco contends with a territorial flock of dinosaurs with newly evolved flight: the early bird Longipteryx. A more profound change takes place in the undergrowth with the rise of flowering plants. The last of the stegosaurs (Yanbeilong) struggle to survive in a world of thorns. A male ankylosaurian (Peloroplites) manages better and secures a mate through a mating call. Rising sea levels lead to new adaptations. On Hațeg Island, a female Hatzegopteryx preys on the insular dwarf sauropods Magyarosaurus. A female Spinosaurus journeys into shallow water and uses bait to catch sharks (Cretodus). Dinosaurs populate every continent, including Antarctica, though danger lurks in space.
4	"Fall"	Darren Williams	March 6, 2026
75 million years ago, an asteroid is knocked into a collision course with Earth. 3 million years later, a dinosaur highly adapted for life in the ocean, the extinct bird Hesperornis, catches fish in a shallow sea dividing North America, but mosasaurs (Tylosaurus) remain a constant threat. Further north, a mother hadrosaur (Edmontosaurus regalis) defends her nest from a marauding pterosaur (Arambourgiania). 66 million years ago, dinosaurs like Ankylosaurus, Pachycephalosaurus and Triceratops wield powerful defensive weapons. A female Tyrannosaurus rex outsmarts and defeats an Ankylosaurus, and drags its carcass to her nest to feed her young. Despite their long history and great success, the dinosaurs are pushed to the brink when the asteroid impacts the Gulf of Mexico. Earthquakes, forest fires, choking dust, and an impact winter wipe out the non-avian dinosaurs. But the human endeavor of paleontology has unearthed their fossils and revealed that some dinosaurs still survive: the birds.

== Reception ==
The Dinosaurs received generally positive reviews, more so than its predecessor. The review aggregator website Rotten Tomatoes lists a 100% approval rating based on eight reviews. Deadline reports that the series had 10.4 million views in the week of March 2–8, 2026. This would rank it as the second-most popular series on Netflix during that week, behind season 4 of Bridgerton (2020–).

The Guardian's Jack Seale praised the effects, writing "the dinosaurs are only a notch below the very best photorealist simulations we have seen." He was also pleased by Freeman's narration, writing "the voiceover is the real draw." His main criticisms were the repetitive storytelling and a lack of depth for specialists. Most other reviewers were impressed by the effects and narrative. Esquire's Henry Wong criticized the series' CGI as "frequently ugly," while also noting that the storytelling was less constrained than traditional wildlife documentaries.

== See also ==
- List of films featuring dinosaurs
