= James Clarke (author) =

James Clarke (born 1972) is an author of books about cinema as well as a film and video producer.

He was a BAFTA shortlist producer for the short film drama Space Dance in January 2002.

He lives in Hereford, England.

== Books ==
- War Films (Virgin Film) 1 August 2006
- George Lucas (Pocket Essential series) 1 June 2002
- Ridley Scott (Virgin Film) 1 March 2003
- Movie Movements (Kamera Books) 1 March 2011
- Animated Films (Virgin Film) 1 September 2007
- Steven Spielberg (Pocket Essential series) 1 June 2004
- Coppola (Virgin Film) 1 January 2004
