= Why We Hate =

2019 documentary television series

Why We Hate is a six-part documentary television series which is an "exploration into the human condition of hatred and how we can overcome it". It was directed by Geeta Gandbhir and Sam Pollard and produced by Steven Spielberg's Amblin Television and Alex Gibney's Jigsaw Productions. It was released on the Discovery Channel on October 13, 2019.

On June 17, 2020, it was announced that a TV special titled Why We Hate: The Reckoning would premiere four days later.

== Summary ==
In the first episode, Origins, evolutionary anthropologist Brian Hare and research scientist, journalist and author Vanessa Woods explain the origins of hate in natural selection: intensive cooperation and love in the in-group was a key factor for the success of our species, but corresponds with competition and hatred for the out-group.

The second episode, Tribalism, follows psychologist Laurie Santos as she aks why we divide the world into "us" and "them". Group psychology shows the mechanisms of tribalism, that makes us love our group and possibly hate other groups, and how this shapes our perceptions.

In the third episode, Tools & Tactics, journalist and author Jelani Cobb researches the fact that our capacity to hate does not work automatically, that hate often is purposefully awakened - and how this is done using propaganda tools like dehumanization, symbols and more.

In the fourth episode, Extremism, extremism expert Sasha Havlicek searches how people are driven to hateful extremist ideologies and what factors lead to de-radicalization.

The fifth episode, Crimes against Humanity, follows international criminal lawyer Patricia Viseur Sellers as she investigates genocides and crimes against humanity - showing the perpetrators as well as those who resisted the call to hate.

In the sixth episode, Hope, neuroscientist Emile Bruneau shows how critical thinking, education and cooperation can help combat hate.

== Episodes ==
No.	Title	Directed by	Original release date	U.S viewers (millions)
1	"Origins"	Geeta Gandbhir, Sam Pollard	October 13, 2019	N/A
2	"Tribalism"	Geeta Gandbhir, Sam Pollard	October 20, 2019	N/A
3	"Tools & Tactics"	Geeta Gandbhir, Sam Pollard	October 27, 2019	N/A
4	"Extremism"	Geeta Gandbhir, Sam Pollard	October 27, 2019	N/A
5	"Crimes Against Humanity"	Geeta Gandbhir, Sam Pollard	November 3, 2019	N/A
6	"Hope"	Geeta Gandbhir, Sam Pollard	November 3, 2019	N/A

== Production ==
Spielberg has long been interested in an exploration of humanity's capacity for hatred and how it can be overcome. According to Spielberg, "Getting to the root of the human condition is something I find not only fascinating, but absolutely necessary in understanding who we are. With the team in place, we delve into historical and modern-day stories of hate, traveling around the globe to uncover its mystery in others and in ourselves. If we understand why we act the way we do, we can change the way we act. That is what we are uniquely capable of as human beings." Why We Hate has been in development for the past four years.
