= Amblin Television =

Television production division of Amblin Partners

Storyteller TV Distribution Co., LLC
- Logo used since 2015
- Trade name: Amblin Television
- Type: Division
- Industry: Television
- Founded: July 31, 1984; 42 years ago
- Founders: Steven Spielberg; Kathleen Kennedy; Frank Marshall
- Headquarters: 100 Universal City Plaza, Building 5121, Universal City, California 91608, United States
- Key people: Justin Falvey (co-president); Darryl Frank (co-president)
- Products: Television series
- Parent: Amblin Entertainment (1984–2015); Amblin Partners (2015–present)
- Divisions: Amblin Documentaries
- Website: amblin.com/tv/

Storyteller TV Distribution Co., LLC, doing business as Amblin Television, is the television production division of Amblin Partners. It was established in 1984 by Amblin Entertainment as a small-screen production arm for Steven Spielberg's Amazing Stories anthology series for NBC. The company has produced television series, including Tiny Toon Adventures, Animaniacs, SeaQuest DSV, ER, Falling Skies, and The Americans.

In 2013, DreamWorks Television, producer of such series as Spin City, Taken, Band of Brothers, The Pacific, United States of Tara, Smash, and the HBO film All the Way, was merged into Amblin Television. Since then, the combined company has produced television shows including The Borgias, Under the Dome, The Haunting and Roswell, New Mexico.

== History ==
In the 1980s and 1990s, Amblin Television produced television series, specials, made-for-TV and cable films, and animated children's programming such as Tiny Toon Adventures and Animaniacs, along with television series adaptations based around Amblin's popular feature films such as Back to the Future, An American Tail, Casper, and Men in Black. In the 1990s, they also ventured into live-action series production with Harry and the Hendersons, seaQuest DSV and Earth 2. Its longest running television series is ER, which aired from 1994 until 2009 for 15 seasons.

In 2013, DreamWorks Television was merged into Amblin Television, the former having been founded by Steven Spielberg and DreamWorks SKG partners Jeffrey Katzenberg and David Geffen in 1996. Soon after the DreamWorks merger, Darryl Frank and Justin Falvey were named co-presidents of Amblin Television.

== Filmography ==
=== Television series ===
Title	Years	Network	Notes
Amazing Stories	1985–1987	NBC	co-production with Universal Television credited under Amblin Entertainment
Tiny Toon Adventures	1990–1995	CBS (episode 1) / Syndication (seasons 1–2) / Fox Kids (season 3)	co-production with Warner Bros. Animation credited under Amblin Entertainment
Harry and the Hendersons	1991–1993	Syndication	credited under Amblin Entertainment in season 1
Back to the Future	1991–1992	CBS	co-production with Universal Cartoon Studios, Zaloom/Mayfield Productions and BIG Pictures
The Young Indiana Jones Chronicles	1992–1993	ABC	co-production with Lucasfilm Ltd. Television and Paramount Television
Fievel's American Tails	1992	CBS	co-production with Nelvana and Universal Cartoon Studios
The Plucky Duck Show	1992	Fox Kids	co-production with Warner Bros. Animation credited under Amblin Entertainment
Family Dog	1993	CBS	co-production with Tim Burton Productions, Nelvana, Universal Television and Warner Bros. Television
seaQuest DSV	1993–1996	NBC	co-production with Universal Television
Animaniacs	1993–1998	Fox Kids (seasons 1–2) / Kids' WB (seasons 3–5)	co-production with Warner Bros. Animation credited under Amblin Entertainment
ER	1994–2009	NBC	co-production with Constant C Productions and Warner Bros. Television
Earth 2	1994–1995	NBC	co-production with Universal Television
Fudge	1995–1996	ABC	co-production with Kevin Slattery Productions and MCA Television Entertainment
Freakazoid!	1995–1997	Kids' WB	co-production with Warner Bros. Animation credited under Amblin Entertainment
Pinky and the Brain	1995–1998	Kids' WB	co-production with Warner Bros. Animation credited under Amblin Entertainment
The Spooktacular New Adventures of Casper	1996–1998	Fox Kids	co-production with Harveytoons and Universal Cartoon Studios
Men in Black: The Series	1997–2001	Kids' WB	co-production with Adelaide Productions and Columbia TriStar Television credited under Amblin Entertainment
Pinky, Elmyra & the Brain	1998–1999	Kids' WB	co-production with Warner Bros. Animation credited under Amblin Entertainment
The Land Before Time	2007–2008	Cartoon Network	co-production with Universal Animation Studios credited under Amblin Entertainment
On the Lot	2007	Fox	co-production with Mark Burnett Productions and DreamWorks Television
The Borgias	2011–2013	Showtime	co-production with CTV (season 1), Bell Media (seasons 2–3), Myriad Pictures, ImageMovers, Take 5 Productions, Octagon Films and Showtime Networks
Terra Nova	2011	Fox	co-production with Chernin Entertainment, Kapital Entertainment, Siesta Productions and 20th Century Fox Television
The River	2012	ABC	co-production with Haunted Movies, J.A. Green Construction Corp. and ABC Studios
The Americans	2013–2018	FX	co-production with Nemo Films, Fox Television Studios (seasons 1–2), Fox 21 Television Studios (seasons 3–6) and FX Productions previously produced by DreamWorks Television in the pilot
Under the Dome	2013–2015	CBS	co-production with Baer Bones and CBS Television Studios
Lucky 7	2013	ABC	co-production with Remainder Men, The Beekeeper's Apprentice Productions and ABC Studios
Falling Skies	2014–2015	TNT	co-production with Invasion Productions and TNT Original Productions seasons 4–5 only; previously produced by DreamWorks Television in seasons 1–3
Extant	2014–2015	CBS	co-production with 22 Plates Productions (season 1) and CBS Television Studios
Red Band Society	2014–2015	Fox	co-production with Filmax and ABC Studios
The Whispers	2015	ABC	co-production with Clickety-Clack Productions and ABC Studios
Public Morals	2015	TNT	co-production with Marlboro Road Gang Productions and TNT Original Productions
Minority Report	2015	Fox	co-production with Paramount Television and 20th Century Fox Television
American Gothic	2016	CBS	co-production with Full Fathom Five, Hyla Regilla Productions and CBS Television Studios
Bull	2016–2019	CBS	co-production with Atelier Paul Attanasio, Picturemaker Productions (seasons 2–3), Stage 29 Productions and CBS Television Studios seasons 1–3 only
Cooper's Treasure	2017–2018	Discovery Channel	co-production with Ample Entertainment
Five Came Back	2017	Netflix	co-production with Scott Rudin Productions, IACF Productions, Passion Pictures and Rock Paper Scrissors Entertainment
Reverie	2018	NBC	co-production with Extant Storytech, Cheap Theatrics Inc., Energy Entertainment and Universal Television
All About the Washingtons	2018	Netflix	co-production with Simmons/Lehman Productions and ABC Signature Studios
The Haunting	2018–2020	Netflix	co-production with FlanaganFilm (season 1), Intrepid Pictures (season 2) and Paramount Television Studios
Roswell, New Mexico	2019–2022	The CW	co-production with My So-Called Company, Bender Brown Productions, CBS Studios and Warner Bros. Television
Why We Hate	2019	Discovery Channel	co-production with Jigsaw Productions and Escape Artists
Tommy	2020	CBS	co-production with Atelier Paul Attanasio and CBS Television Studios
Amazing Stories	2020	Apple TV+	co-production with ABC Studios, Kitsis/Horowitz and Universal Television
Laurel Canyon	2020	Epix	co-production with Jigsaw Productions, The Kennedy/Marshall Company, Warner Music Entertainment and MGM Television
Brave New World	2020	Peacock	co-production with David Wiener and Universal Content Productions
Jurassic World Camp Cretaceous	2020–2022	Netflix	co-production with Universal Pictures and DreamWorks Animation Television credited under Amblin Entertainment
Animaniacs	2020–2023	Hulu	co-production with Warner Bros. Animation
Resident Alien	2021–2025	Syfy (season 1–3) / USA Network (season 4)	co-production with Dark Horse Comics and Universal Content Productions
Billy the Kid	2022–2025	Epix (season 1) / MGM+ (season 2-4)	co-production with One Big Picture, De Line Pictures, MGM Television and MGM+ Originals
Halo	2022–2024	Paramount+	co-production with Chapter Eleven (season 1), David Wiener (season 2), One Big Picture, 343 Industries and Showtime Networks
Fatal Attraction	2023	Paramount+	co-production with Nutmegger and Paramount Television Studios
Gremlins	2023–2025	HBO Max / Cartoon Network	co-production with Warner Bros. Animation
San Francisco Sounds: A Place in Time	2023	MGM+	co-production with Jigsaw Productions, K/M Documentaries, FourScore Productions, Sony Music Entertainment, Warner Music Entertainment and MGM+ Studios
Big Vape: The Rise and Fall of Juul	2023	Netflix	co-production with This Machine Filmworks and Time Studios
Encounters	2023	Netflix	co-production with Boardwalk Pictures, Vice Studios and Motherboard
Life on Our Planet	2023	Netflix	co-production with Silverback Films
Tiny Toons Looniversity	2023–2025	HBO Max / Cartoon Network	co-production with Warner Bros. Animation
Masters of the Air	2024	Apple TV+	co-production with Playtone and Apple Studios
Jurassic World: Chaos Theory	2024–2025	Netflix	co-production with Universal Television and DreamWorks Animation Television credited under Amblin Entertainment
The Dinosaurs	2026	Netflix	co-production with Silverback Films credited under Amblin Documentaries
Cape Fear	2026	Apple TV	co-production with Eat the Cat, Sikelia Productions and Universal Content Productions
Upcoming
All the Sinners Bleed	TBA	Netflix	co-production with Higher Ground Productions
Easy Rawlins	TBA	TBA	co-production with B.O.B FilmHouse, Inc. and JB Pictures
Friends Like These	TBA	TBA	
Our Time	TBA	Disney+	co-production with Warner Bros. Television, The Jackal Group and The Donners' Company
Rashomon	TBA	HBO Max	co-production with Opus7 Entertainment and Atmosphere Entertainment
Signs of Survival: A Memory of the Holocaust	TBA	TBA	co-production with Scholastic Entertainment and Solo One Productions
The Afghanistan Papers	TBA	TBA	co-production with Jigsaw Productions
The Talisman	TBA	Netflix	co-production with Upside Down Pictures and Paramount Television Studios
The Woman's Hour	TBA	The CW	co-production with Warner Bros. Television

=== Television specials ===
Airdate	Title	Network	Notes
December 18, 1991	A Wish for Wings That Work	CBS	co-production with Universal Cartoon Studios
March 27, 1994	Tiny Toon Spring Break	Fox	co-production with Warner Bros. Animation credited as Amblin Entertainment
May 28, 1995	Tiny Toons' Night Ghoulery	Fox	co-production with Warner Bros. Animation credited as Amblin Entertainment
April 2, 2009	Previously on ER	NBC	co-production with John Wells Productions, Constant C Productions and Warner Bros. Television; Retrospective special of ER
June 21, 2020	Why We Hate: The Reckoning	Discovery Channel	co-production with Jigsaw Productions
November 15, 2022	Jurassic World Camp Cretaceous: Hidden Adventure	Netflix	co-production with Universal Pictures and DreamWorks Animation Television credited under Amblin Entertainment; Interactive special
March 8, 2024	Tiny Toons Looniversity: Spring Beak	HBO Max / Cartoon Network	co-production with Warner Bros. Animation
December 6, 2024	Tiny Toons Looniversity: Winter Blunderland	HBO Max / Cartoon Network	co-production with Warner Bros. Animation
March 22, 2025	Tiny Toons Looniversity: Nightmare on Toon Street	HBO Max / Cartoon Network	co-production with Warner Bros. Animation

=== Television films ===
Airdate	Title	Network	Notes
August 24, 1992	The Water Engine	TNT	co-production with Brandman Productions, Majestic Films International and Planet Productions
September 8, 1992	The Habitation of Dragons	TNT	co-production with Brandman Productions and Planet Productions
January 26, 1993	Cooperstown	TNT	co-production with Brandman Productions
February 20, 1993	The Heart of Justice	TNT	co-production with Brandman Productions and Planet Productions
April 12, 1993	Class of '61	ABC	co-production with Universal Television
August 23, 1993	Arthur Miller's The American Clock	TNT	co-production with Brandman Productions
September 7, 1993	Percy & Thunder	TNT	co-production with Brandman Productions
October 3, 1993	Trouble Shooters: Trapped Beneath the Earth	NBC	co-production with Walter Mirisch Productions, Gingko Productions and MCA Television Entertainment
October 15, 1994	Young Indiana Jones and the Hollywood Follies	The Family Channel	co-production with Lucasfilm and Paramount Television credited under Amblin Entertainment
January 15, 1995	Young Indiana Jones and the Treasure of the Peacock's Eye	The Family Channel	co-production with Lucasfilm credited under Amblin Entertainment
October 8, 1995	Young Indiana Jones and the Attack of the Hawkmen	The Family Channel	co-production with Lucasfilm credited under Amblin Entertainment
June 16, 1996	Young Indiana Jones: Travels with Father	The Family Channel	co-production with Lucasfilm credited under Amblin Entertainment
May 21, 2016	All the Way	HBO	co-production with HBO Films, Moon Shot Entertainment, Tale Told Productions and Everyman Pictures
May 5, 2020	Natalie Wood: What Remains Behind	HBO Max	co-production with Nedland Media and HBO Documentary Films
October 18, 2022	Mama's Boy	HBO / HBO Max	co-production with LD Entertainment, Playtone, Nedland Media and HBO Documentary Films
November 4, 2022	Good Night Oppy	Amazon Prime Video	co-production with Amazon Studios, Film 45 and Tripod Media credited under Amblin Entertainment
March 15, 2024	The Bloody Hundredth	Apple TV+	co-production with Playtone and Herzog & Co.
July 13, 2024	Faye	HBO / HBO Max	co-production with HBO Documentary Films and Nedland Media credited under Amblin Documentaries
July 17, 2024	Wild Wild Space	HBO / HBO Max	co-production with HBO Documentary Films, Planet Labs, Hyperobject Industries and Zero Point Zero Production credited under Amblin Documentaries
November 1, 2024	Music by John Williams	Disney+	co-production with Lucasfilm Ltd., Imagine Documentaries and Nedland Media credited under Amblin Documentaries
July 10, 2025	Jaws @ 50	National Geographic	co-production with Nedland Media credited under Amblin Documentaries
August 8, 2025	Stolen: Heist of the Century	Netflix	co-production with Raw TV and Wildside credited under Amblin Documentaries
