= John Culhane =

Australian rules footballer, born 1900

Personal information
- Full name: John Culhane
- Born: 28 February 1900; Briagolong, Victoria
- Died: 25 September 1979 (aged 79); Kew, Victoria
- Original team: Traralgon

Playing career^{1}
Years	Club	Games (Goals)
1925	Richmond	1 (0)
- ^{1} Playing statistics correct to the end of 1925.

John Culhane (28 February 1900 – 25 September 1979) was an Australian rules footballer who played with Richmond in the Victorian Football League (VFL). His sole senior game for Richmond in 1925 proved more controversial off the field than it was notable on the field.

Originally from Traralgon, Culhane first trialled with Richmond in 1922, playing in pre-season matches then and in 1923. He had originally been cleared from Traralgon to Richmond in 1923, then returned to Traralgon without playing a senior game and without a clearance. After he was called up to Richmond for his senior game in 1925, the Gippsland Football League still considered Culhane a Traralgon player since he had been playing for Traralgon that year, and disqualified him for three years for playing elsewhere without a valid clearance; the VFL considered Culhane a Richmond player since he had never been cleared back to Traralgon from Richmond, and refused to recognise the Gippsland Football League's jurisdiction to disqualify him, putting the two leagues in dispute. Richmond and the VFL cleared Culhane to Yallourn at the start of 1926, causing further disputes with the Gippsland League who still considered him a disqualified Traralgon player; on this point, the VFL later admitted error, and the Gippsland League lifted Culhane's disqualification after Round 6.
