= Music by John Williams =

2024 documentary film

- Film poster
- Directed by: Laurent Bouzereau
- Produced by: Sara Bernstein; Laurent Bouzereau; Justin Falvey; Darryl Frank; Brian Grazer; Ron Howard; Meredith Kaulfers; Kathleen Kennedy; Frank Marshall; Steven Spielberg; Justin Wilkes
- Starring: John Williams
- Cinematography: Toby Thiermann
- Edited by: Sierra Neal; David Palmer; Jason Summers
- Music by: John Williams
- Production companies: Lucasfilm; Amblin Documentaries; Imagine Documentaries; Nedland Media
- Distributed by: Disney+
- Release dates: October 23, 2024 (AFI Fest); November 1, 2024
- Running time: 105 minutes
- Country: United States
- Language: English

Music by John Williams is a 2024 American documentary film about the composer and conductor John Williams, produced and directed by Laurent Bouzereau.

== Background and synopsis ==
The film explores the life and career of John Williams. Williams composed music for many films throughout his career, including the Star Wars series, the Indiana Jones series, E.T. the Extra-Terrestrial. The film contains interviews with many of the directors and cast members Williams has collaborated with, including Steven Spielberg, George Lucas, Ron Howard, Chris Columbus, Kate Capshaw, Ke Huy Quan, Kathleen Kennedy, Itzhak Perlman, and J. J. Abrams, alongside with Williams's close colleagues composers, such as David Newman, Thomas Newman and Alan Silvestri, who also worked on Steven Spielberg's various projects.

== Release ==
Interviews given at the film's premiere

Music by John Williams opened the 2024 AFI Fest on October 23. It was given a limited release and premiered on Disney+ on November 1.

== Reception ==
=== Critical response ===
On the review aggregator website Rotten Tomatoes, 100% of 49 critics' reviews are positive, with an average rating of 8.1/10. The website's consensus reads: "A warm retrospective on a modern master, this documentary is a symphonic treat for anyone who loves music in the movies -- or just plain great music." Metacritic, which uses a weighted average, assigned the film a score of 74 out of 100, based on 12 critics, indicating "generally favorable" reviews.

Peter Debruge of Variety wrote, "It is not a documentary so much as a tribute, a tool for fans designed to celebrate Williams' legacy without getting too personal or technical in the process."

Matt Goldberg of TheWrap wrote, "While I wish the film got more into the weeds of where Williams and his work exists in comparison to those who preceded and those who followed him, this is still the kind of inoffensive celebratory piece that will have you eager to revisit his most beloved scores while gaining a bit more insight into their creation."

=== Accolades ===
With his Grammy win for Best Music Film at the 68th Grammy Awards, Steven Spielberg became the 22nd competitive EGOT winner.

Award	Category	Nominee(s)	Result	Ref
Primetime Emmy Awards	Outstanding Sound Editing for a Nonfiction or Reality Program	Dmitri Makarov, dialogue editor; Tim Farrell and Richard Gould, sound effects editors; Ramiro Belgardt, music editor	Won	
Primetime Emmy Awards	Outstanding Sound Mixing for a Nonfiction Program	Roy Waldspurger, re-recording mixer; Christopher Barnett, CAS, and Noah Alexander, production mixer	Nominated	
Critics' Choice Documentary Awards	Best Music Documentary		Won	
Critics' Choice Documentary Awards	Best Documentary Feature		Nominated	
Cinema Audio Society Awards	Outstanding Achievement in Sound Mixing for a Motion Picture – Documentary	Noah Alexander, production mixer; Christopher Barnett, CAS, and Roy Waldspurger, re-recording mixers	Won	
Grammy Awards	Best Music Film	Laurent Bouzereau, video director; Sara Bernstein, Laurent Bouzereau, Justin Falvey, Darryl Frank, Brian Grazer, Ron Howard, Meredith Kaulfers, Kathleen Kennedy, Frank Marshall, Steven Spielberg, and Justin Wilkes, video producers	Won	
