= The Steven Spielberg Story =

1983 book by Tony Crawley

The Steven Spielberg Story is a book by Tony Crawley published in 1983.

== Plot summary ==
The Steven Spielberg Story is a book about Steven Spielberg.

== Reception ==
Dave Pringle reviewed The Steven Spielberg Story for Imagine magazine, and stated that "Written in breathless journalese, this is no biographical masterpiece but it serves to remind us how irrelevant the written word has become in an age when clever, confident lads like Spielberg are the ones who are really setting the pace in terms of conveying science-fiction dreams to the masse."

== Reviews ==
- Review by Michael Klossner (1985) in Fantasy Review, January 1985
