= Mark Harris (journalist) =

American journalist and author (born 1963)

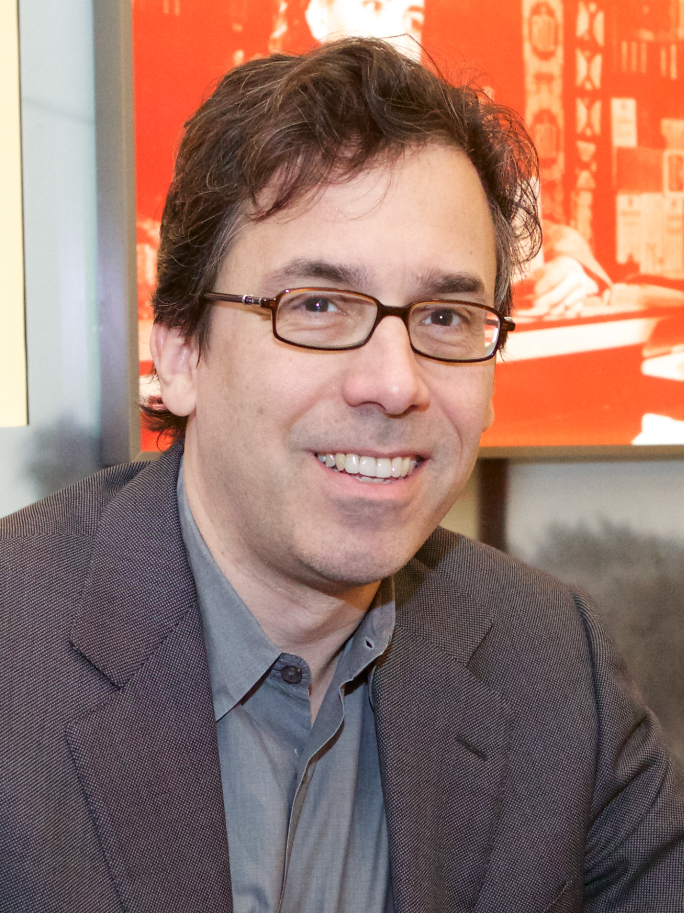
- Harris in 2014
- Born: November 25, 1963 (age 62); New York City, United States
- Education: Yale University
- Occupations: Journalist; author
- Spouse: Tony Kushner (m. 2008)
- Writing career
- Period: 1989–present
- Subjects: Film; popular culture

Mark Harris (born November 25, 1963, in New York City) is an American journalist and author. He began his career at Entertainment Weekly as a columnist and eventually became the magazine's executive editor. His writing has also appeared in Slate and New York magazine.

Harris has written three books relating to American film history. His first book, Pictures at a Revolution: Five Movies and the Birth of the New Hollywood, about changes in Hollywood in the 1960s and the rise of the New Hollywood movement, was published in 2008. His second book, Five Came Back: A Story of Hollywood and the Second World War, examined five American directors who made films for the U.S. military during World War II. It was published in 2014 and later adapted into a 2017 Netflix documentary series, Five Came Back. His third book, Mike Nichols: A Life, a biography about the filmmaker, was published in 2021.

== Career ==
After graduating from Yale University in 1985, Harris worked at Entertainment Weekly. He began as a columnist and later became executive editor of the magazine.

Since 2008, he has written and released three books. The first, Pictures at a Revolution: Five Movies and the Birth of the New Hollywood, an examination of how the American film industry changed during the 1960s, was published in February 2008. Writing in The New York Times Book Review, the author Jim Shepard called it "full of pleasures ... He seems to have talked to virtually everyone who’s still around, and to great effect ... Mark Harris's legwork and intelligence transport us gratefully back to that exhilarating moment when it was all still about to occur."

In February 2014, Harris published his second book, Five Came Back: A Story of Hollywood and the Second World War. It is an examination of five U.S. film directors — John Ford, William Wyler, John Huston, Frank Capra and George Stevens — and their frontline work during World War II. The book was well received, with The New York Times calling it, "a tough-minded, information-packed and irresistibly readable work", and The Washington Post writing that the book "has all the elements of a good movie: fascinating characters, challenges, conflicts and intense action". The trade publication Booklist wrote, "It's hardly news that the movies affect and are affected by the broader canvas of popular culture and world history, but Harris – perhaps more successfully than any other writer, past or present – manages to find in that symbiotic relationship the stuff of great stories," calling the book, "narrative nonfiction that is as gloriously readable as it is unfailingly informative". In 2017, the book was adapted into a three-part Netflix documentary series Five Came Back.

His third book, Mike Nichols: A Life, was published in February 2021 to critical acclaim.

Harris is a columnist and feature writer for New York magazine.

== Personal life ==
Harris grew up in a Jewish and Catholic family. He is married to the playwright Tony Kushner. In attendance at the couple's May 2003 commitment ceremony were the director George C. Wolfe, the playwright Larry Kramer, Mike Nichols and Diane Sawyer, the actresses Linda Emond and Kathleen Chalfant and, The New York Times reported, "dozens of aunts, uncles, nieces and nephews, many of them crying". Theirs was the first same-sex commitment ceremony to appear in the "Vows" column of The New York Times. They live in New York City and Provincetown, Massachusetts.

In summer 2008 (after Massachusetts had legalized same-sex marriage in 2004, but before New York or the U.S. Supreme Court had done so), they were legally married at the city hall in Provincetown.

== Bibliography ==
- Pictures at a Revolution: Five Movies and the Birth of the New Hollywood. Penguin Press. 2008. ISBN 9781594201523.
- Five Came Back: A Story of Hollywood and the Second World War. Penguin Press. 2014. ISBN 9781782112884.
- Mike Nichols: A Life. Penguin Press. 2021. ISBN 9780399562242.

== See also ==
- LGBT culture in New York City
- List of LGBT people from New York City
- New Yorkers in journalism
- NYC Pride March
