= Steven Spielberg =

American filmmaker (born 1946)

Steven Spielberg KBE
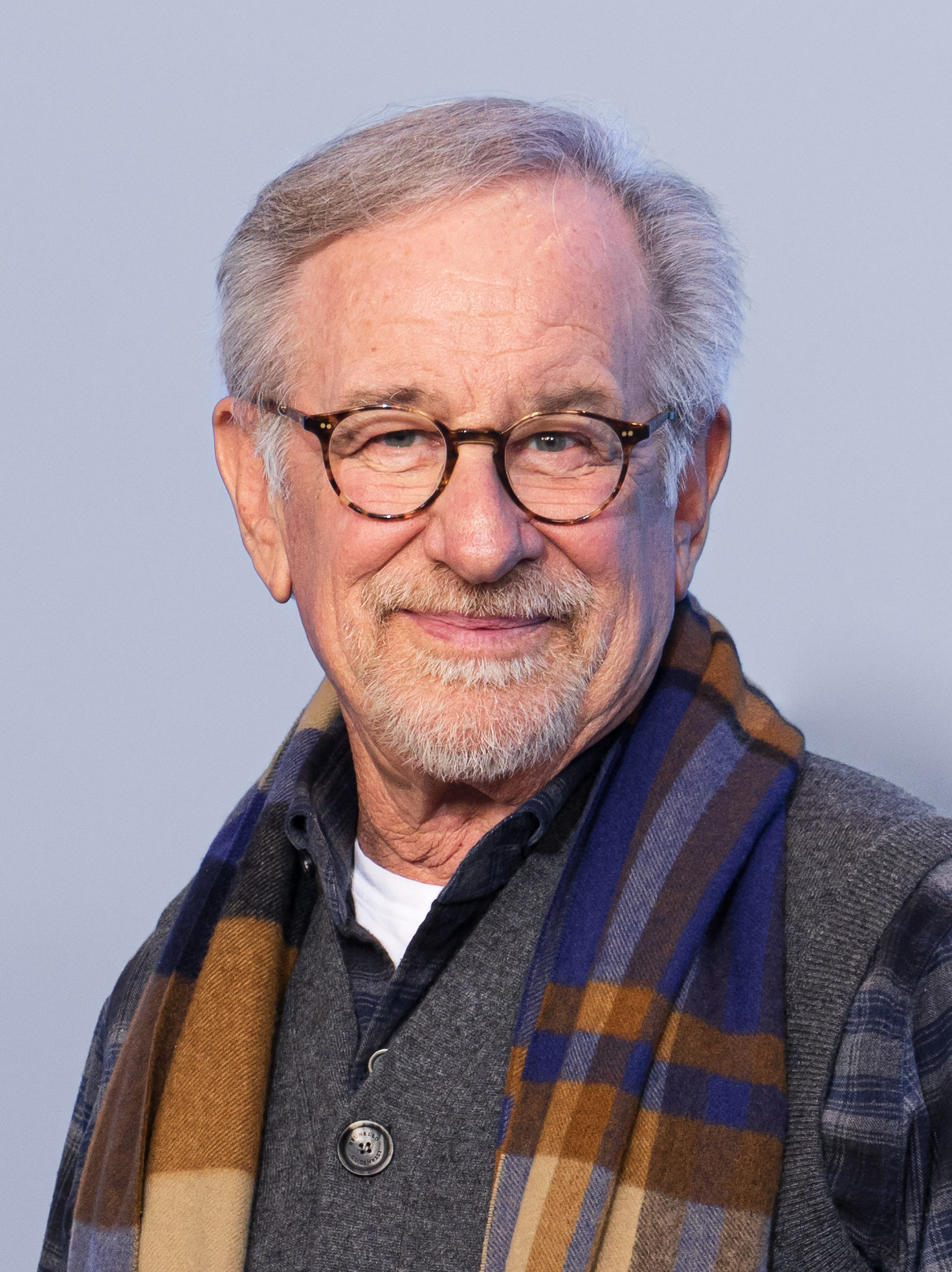
- Spielberg in 2023
- Born: Steven Allan Spielberg; December 18, 1946 (age 79); Cincinnati, Ohio, US
- Education: California State University, Long Beach (BA)
- Occupations: Director; producer; screenwriter
- Years active: 1959–present
- Organizations: Amblin Entertainment; Amblin Partners; DreamWorks Pictures
- Works: Filmography; unrealized projects
- Spouses: Amy Irving (m. 1985; div. 1989); Kate Capshaw (m. 1991)
- Children: 6, including Sasha, Sawyer, and Destry
- Father: Arnold Spielberg
- Relatives: Anne Spielberg (sister); Nancy Spielberg (sister); Jessica Capshaw (stepdaughter)
- Awards: Full list
- Spielberg's voice Spielberg at the premiere of Music by John Williams (2024); Recorded October 2024

Steven Allan Spielberg (/ˈspiːlbɜːrɡ/; born December 18, 1946) is an American filmmaker. A major figure of the New Hollywood era and pioneer of the modern blockbuster, Spielberg is widely regarded as one of the greatest and most influential filmmakers in the history of cinema and is the highest-grossing film director of all time, with his films having earned almost $11 billion worldwide. Among other accolades, he has received three Academy Awards, four Golden Globe Awards, four BAFTA Awards, twelve Emmy Awards, a Tony Award, and a Grammy Award, as well as the AFI Life Achievement Award in 1995, an honorary knighthood in 2001, the Kennedy Center Honor in 2006, the Cecil B. DeMille Award in 2009, the Presidential Medal of Freedom in 2015, and the National Medal of Arts in 2023. According to Forbes, he is one of the world's wealthiest celebrities, with a net worth of at least $5.3 billion. He is one of 22 people to achieve EGOT status.

Spielberg was born in Cincinnati, Ohio and grew up in Phoenix, Arizona. He developed an interest in filmmaking from a young age and studied film in college. Starting his career in television, Spielberg made his directorial debut with Duel (1971). His theatrical debut was The Sugarland Express (1974), which began his decades-long collaboration with composer John Williams. He became a household name with Jaws (1975), Close Encounters of the Third Kind (1977), E.T. the Extra-Terrestrial (1982) and the original Indiana Jones trilogy (1981–1989). He explored drama in The Color Purple (1985) and Empire of the Sun (1987).

Spielberg directed the historical war epics Schindler's List (1993)—which has often been listed as one of the greatest films ever made—and Saving Private Ryan (1998), both of which won him the Academy Award for Best Director with the former also earning him Best Picture. He has also directed the science fiction films Jurassic Park (1993)—which became the highest-grossing film at the time—A.I. Artificial Intelligence (2001), Minority Report (2002), War of the Worlds (2005), Ready Player One (2018) and Disclosure Day (2026); the historical dramas Amistad (1997), Munich (2005), War Horse (2011), Lincoln (2012), Bridge of Spies (2015) and The Post (2017); the comedies Catch Me If You Can (2002) and The Terminal (2004); the animated film The Adventures of Tintin (2011); the musical West Side Story (2021); and the family drama The Fabelmans (2022).

Spielberg co-founded Amblin Entertainment and DreamWorks Pictures, and he has served as a producer for many successful films and television series, among them Poltergeist (1982), Gremlins (1984), Back to the Future (1985), An American Tail (1986), Who Framed Roger Rabbit (1988), Animaniacs (1993), Pinky and the Brain (1995), Twister (1996), Band of Brothers (2001) and Transformers (2007). Several of Spielberg's works are considered among the greatest films in history, and some are among the highest-grossing ever. Seven of his films have been inducted into the National Film Registry by the Library of Congress as being "culturally, historically or aesthetically significant". In 2013, Time listed him as one of the 100 most influential people, and in 2023, Spielberg was the recipient of the first ever Time 100 Impact Award in the United States.

== Early life and education ==
Steven Allan Spielberg was born on December 18, 1946, in Cincinnati, Ohio, the eldest child and only son of four children. His mother, Leah Adler (née Posner), was a concert pianist who ran a kosher dairy restaurant, and his father, Arnold, was an electrical engineer involved in the development of computers. His immediate family were Reform Jewish/Orthodox Jewish. Spielberg's paternal grandparents were Ukrainian Jews; his grandmother Rebecca (née Chechi), was from Sudylkiv, and his grandfather Shmuel Spielberg was from Kamianets-Podilskyi. Spielberg has three younger sisters: Anne, Sue, and Nancy. At their home in Cincinnati, his grandmother taught English to Holocaust survivors. They, in turn, taught him numbers:

One man in particular, I kept looking at his numbers – his number tattooed on his forearm ... he started – you know, when – during the dinner break, when everybody was eating and not learning, he would point to the numbers. And he would say, that is a two, and that is a four. And then he'd say, and this is a eight, and that's a one. And I'll never forget this. And he said, and that's a nine. And then he crooked his arm and inverted his arm and said, and see, it becomes a six. It's magic. And now it's a nine, and now it's a six, and now it's a nine and now it's a six. And that's really how I learned my numbers for the first time ... the irony of all that, and the gift of that lesson, never really dawned on me until I was much older.

In 1952, his family moved to Haddon Township, New Jersey, after his father was hired by RCA. Spielberg attended Hebrew school from 1953 to 1957, in classes taught by Rabbi Albert L. Lewis. In early 1957, the family moved to Phoenix, Arizona. Spielberg had a bar mitzvah ceremony when he was thirteen. His family was involved in the synagogue and had many Jewish friends. Of the Holocaust, he said that his parents "talked about it all the time, and so it was always on my mind". His father had lost between sixteen and twenty relatives in the Holocaust. Spielberg found it difficult accepting his heritage; he said: "It isn't something I enjoy admitting ... but when I was seven, eight, nine years old, God forgive me, I was embarrassed because we were Orthodox Jews. I was embarrassed by the outward perception of my parents' Jewish practices. I was never really ashamed to be Jewish, but I was uneasy at times." Spielberg was the target of antisemitism: "In high school, I got smacked and kicked around. Two bloody noses. It was horrible." He gradually followed Judaism less during adolescence, after his family had moved to various neighborhoods and found themselves to be the only Jews.

Spielberg's parents took him to see Cecil B. DeMille's The Greatest Show on Earth (1952). He had never seen a movie before, and thought they were taking him to the circus. He was terrified by the movie's train crash, and at age 12, recreated it with his Lionel trains and filmed it. He recalls: "The trains went around and around, and after a while that got boring, and I had this eight-millimeter camera, and I staged a train wreck and filmed it. That was hard on the trains, but then I could cut the film lots of different ways and look at it over and over again." This was his first home movie. In 1958, he became a Boy Scout, attaining the rank of Eagle Scout at age 13. Spielberg used his father's movie camera to make amateur features, and took it along on every Scout trip. He fulfilled a requirement for the photography merit badge by making a nine-minute 8 mm Western, The Last Gunfight. At age 13, he made a 40-minute war film, Escape to Nowhere, with a cast of classmates. It won first prize in a statewide competition. Spielberg made about fifteen to twenty 8 mm adventure films. He recalls that

my dad told me stories about World War II constantly ... I knew, based on the stories my dad and his friends were telling about World War II, that there was no glory in war. And it was ugly, and it was cruel ... it was, you know, visually devastating. And so I thought, someday, if I ever do make a war movie for real, it's got to be something that tells the truth about what those experiences had been for those young 17-, 18-, 19-year-old boys storming Omaha Beach, let's say.

Spielberg went to the local theater every Saturday. Formative films included Victor Fleming's Captains Courageous (1937), Disney's Pinocchio and Fantasia (both 1940), Akira Kurosawa's Rashomon (1950) and The Seven Samurai (1954), Ishirō Honda's Godzilla, King of the Monsters! (1956), David Lean's Bridge on the River Kwai (1957) and Lawrence of Arabia (1962) ("the film that set me on my journey"), Alfred Hitchcock's The Birds (1963) and Stanley Kubrick's Dr. Strangelove (1964) and 2001: A Space Odyssey (1968) ("I'm still living off the adrenalin that ... I experienced watching that film for the first time.") He attended Arcadia High School for three years. He wrote and directed a science fiction film, Firelight, funded mainly by his father. It was shown in a local theater for one evening and grossed $501 against its $500 budget.

He took a tour at Universal Studios. He jumped off the tour bus and hid in a bathroom until it left. Fortunately, "There happened to be avery nice man there named Chuck Silvers who ran the library at Universal. And when I said I jumped off the bus because I wanted to be a movie director, he thought that was terrific." Silver asked to see Spielberg's shorts, and gave him a three-day pass. On the fourth day, he walked up to the studio gates without a pass, and the security guard waved him in: "I basically spent the next two months at Universal Studios ... that was how I became an unofficial apprentice that summer." His family later moved to Saratoga, California, where he attended Saratoga High School. A year later, his parents divorced. Spielberg moved to Los Angeles to stay with his father, while his three sisters and mother remained in Saratoga. He recalls his mother had "a huge adventurous personality. We always saw her as Peter Pan, the kid who never wanted to grow up, and she sort of saw herself that way. I think my mom lived a lot of childhoods in her ninety-seven years." He was not interested in academics, focusing on filmmaking. He applied to the University of Southern California's film school but was turned down because of his mediocre grades. He then applied and enrolled at California State University, Long Beach, where he became a brother of Theta Chi fraternity. In 1968, Universal gave Spielberg the opportunity to write and direct a short film for theatrical release, the 26-minute 35 mm Amblin'. Studio vice president Sidney Sheinberg was impressed and offered Spielberg a seven-year directing contract. A year later, he dropped out of college to begin directing television productions for Universal, making him the youngest director to be signed to a long-term plan with a major Hollywood studio.

He recalls a formative encounter with one of his favorite filmmakers, John Ford, who said: "So they tell me you want to be a picture maker. You see those paintings around the office?" Spielberg said he did. Ford pointed to a painting and asked, "Where's the horizon?" Spielberg said it was at the top. Ford asked him where it was in another painting. Spielberg said it was at the bottom. Ford said, "When you're able to distinguish the art of the horizon at the bottom of a frame or at the top of the frame, but not going right through the center of the frame, when you can appreciate why it's at the top and why it's at the bottom, you might make a pretty good picture maker."

== Career ==
=== 1969–1974: On the horizon ===
Spielberg's professional debut was "Eyes" (1969), a Night Gallery segment scripted by Rod Serling and starring Joan Crawford. Initially, there was skepticism from Crawford and studio executives regarding Spielberg's inexperience. His initial contributions received mixed responses, leading Spielberg to briefly step back from studio work. Crawford, reflecting on her collaboration with Spielberg, recognized his potential, noting his unique intuitive inspiration. She expressed her appreciation for Spielberg's talent in a note to him and communicated her approval to Serling. Crawford's endorsement highlighted Spielberg's early recognition in Hollywood despite hesitations regarding his experience. He was hired to do the segment "Make Me Laugh". He recalled "I came on the set, and because it was only 11 minutes long I had this idea of shooting the whole 11 minutes in one shot. [...] But I staged the whole thing across four sets in one shot. Storyboarded it, rehearsed it, everybody was excited about it, and then when the executives sat down to watch the rushes the next day they saw the entire 10-minute take of most of the show. And they were appalled."

In the early 1970s, Spielberg unsuccessfully tried to raise financing for his own low-budget films. He co-wrote and directed teleplays for Marcus Welby, M.D., The Name of the Game, Columbo, Owen Marshall, Counselor at Law and The Psychiatrist. The Columbo episode directed was the show's inaugural, non-pilot episode, "Murder by the Book". Although unsatisfied with his work, Spielberg used the opportunity to hone his craft. He earned good reviews and impressed producers; he was earning a steady income and relocated to Laurel Canyon, LA.

Spielberg's directorial debut was Duel (1971), adapted from Richard Matheson's short story about a salesman (Dennis Weaver) being chased down a highway by a psychotic tanker truck driver. Executives decided to promote the film on television. Reviews were positive, and Universal asked Spielberg to shoot more scenes so it could be released theatrically. "Deservedly so" writes David Thomson, "for it stands up as one of the medium's most compelling spirals of suspense. The ordinariness of the Dennis Weaver character and the monstrous malignance of the truck confront one another with a narrative assurance that never needs to remind us of the element of fable." Spielberg described it as "Godzilla vs. Bambi". Duel aired on Barry Diller's ABC Movie of the Week before its theatrical release. More TV films followed: Something Evil (1972), which aired on CBS, and Savage (1973), which aired on NBC.

Spielberg made his theatrical debut with The Sugarland Express (1974), based on a true story of a married couple (Goldie Hawn and William Atherton) on the run, desperate to regain custody of their baby from foster parents. The film marked the first of many collaborations with composer John Williams. It was awarded Best Screenplay at the 1974 Cannes Film Festival but was not a commercial success, which Spielberg blamed on Universal's inconsistent marketing. Pauline Kael wrote "Spielberg uses his gifts in a very free-and-easy, American way—for humor, and for a physical response to action. He could be that rarity among directors, a born entertainer—perhaps a new generation's Howard Hawks." The Hollywood Reporter wrote that "a major new director is on the horizon".

=== 1975–1980: Magician ===
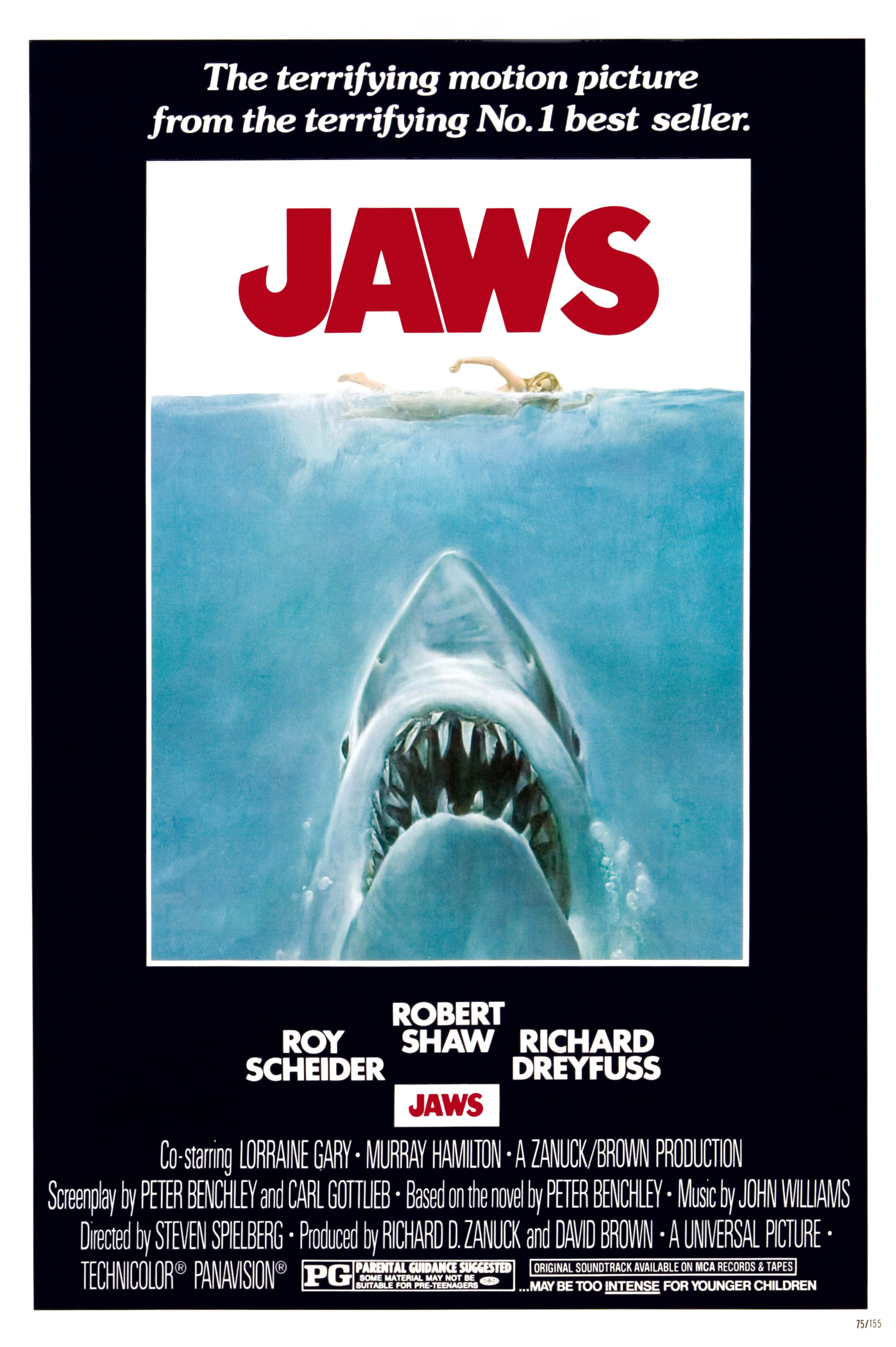
Poster for Jaws (1975)

Producers Richard D. Zanuck and David Brown took a chance by giving Spielberg the opportunity to direct Jaws (1975), a thriller based on Peter Benchley's bestseller. In it, a great white shark attacks beachgoers at a resort town, prompting police chief Martin Brody (Roy Scheider) to hunt it with the help of a marine biologist (Richard Dreyfuss) and a veteran shark hunter (Robert Shaw). Jaws was the first film shot on open ocean, so shooting proved difficult, especially when the mechanical shark malfunctioned. The shooting schedule overran by a hundred days, and Universal threatened to cancel production. Against expectations, Jaws was a success, setting the domestic box-office record and making Spielberg a household name. It won Academy Awards for Best Film Editing (Verna Fields), Academy Award for Best Original Score (John Williams) and Best Sound (Robert Hoyt, Roger Heman, Earl Madery and John Carter). Spielberg said the malfunctioning mechanical shark resulted in a better movie, as he had to find other ways to suggest the villain's presence. Kael called it the "most cheerfully perverse scare movie ever made", adding "it’s funny in a Woody Allen way." She quoted an older director as saying Spielberg thought beyond the visual dynamics of the theater: "he’s the first one of us who doesn’t think in terms of the proscenium arch. With him, there’s nothing but the camera lens."

Like Coppola on The Godfather, Spielberg asserted his own role and deftly organized the elements into a roller coaster entertainment without sacrificing inner meanings. The suspense of the picture came from meticulous technique and good humor about its own surgical cutting. You have only to submit to the travesty of Jaws 2 to realize how much more engagingly Spielberg saw the ocean, the perils, the sinister beauty of the shark, and the vitality of its human opponents.

— Critic David Thompson

After declining an offer to make Jaws 2, Spielberg and Dreyfuss reunited to work on a film about UFOs, Close Encounters of the Third Kind (1977). Spielberg used 65 mm film for the best picture quality, and a new live-action recording system so recordings could be duplicated later. He cast one of his favorite directors, François Truffaut, as the scientist Claude Lacombe and worked with special effects expert Douglas Trumbull. It marked the first of many collaborations between Spielberg and editor Michael Kahn. One of the rare films both written and directed by Spielberg, Close Encounters won Academy Awards for Best Cinematography (Vilmos Zsigmond) and Best Sound Effects Editing (Frank Warner). Stanley Kauffmann wrote: "I saw Close Encounters at its first public showing in New York, and most of the audience stayed...to watch the credits crawl lengthily at the end. For one thing, under the credits the giant spaceship was returning to the stars. For another, they just didn't want to leave this picture. For still another, they seemed to understand the importance of those many names to what they had just seen." Kauffmann placed it first on his list of the best American films from 1968 to 1977. Kael called Spielberg "a magician in the age of movies".

His next directorial work was 1941 (1979), an action-comedy written by Robert Zemeckis and Bob Gale about Californians preparing for a Japanese invasion after the attack on Pearl Harbor. Spielberg was self-conscious about doing comedy as he had no prior experience in it. Universal and Columbia agreed to co-finance the film. 1941 grossed more than $92 million worldwide upon release, but most critics, and the studio heads, disliked it. Charles Champlin described 1941 as "the most conspicuous waste since the last major oil spill, which it somewhat resembles."

=== 1981–1992: Impresario ===
Spielberg directed Raiders of the Lost Ark (1981), with a screenplay by Lawrence Kasdan based on a story by George Lucas and Philip Kaufman. They considered it a homage to the serials of the 1930s and 40s. It starred Harrison Ford as Indiana Jones and Karen Allen as Marion Ravenwood. Filmed in La Rochelle, Hawaii, Tunisia and Elstree Studios, England, the shoot was difficult but Spielberg said it helped him hone his business acumen. The film was a box-office success and won Academy Awards for Best Art Direction (Norman Reynolds, Leslie Dilley and Michael D. Ford); Best Film Editing (Michael Kahn); Best Sound (Bill Varney, Steve Maslow, Gregg Landaker and Roy Charman); Best Sound Editing (Ben Burtt and Richard L. Anderson) and Best Visual Effects (Richard Edlund, Kit West, Bruce Nicholson and Joe Johnston). Roger Ebert wrote: "Raiders of the Lost Ark is an out-of-body experience, a movie of glorious imagination and breakneck speed that grabs you in the first shot, hurtles you through a series of incredible adventures, and deposits you back in reality two hours later–breathless, dizzy, wrung-out, and with a silly grin on your face". Raiders was the first film in the Indiana Jones franchise.

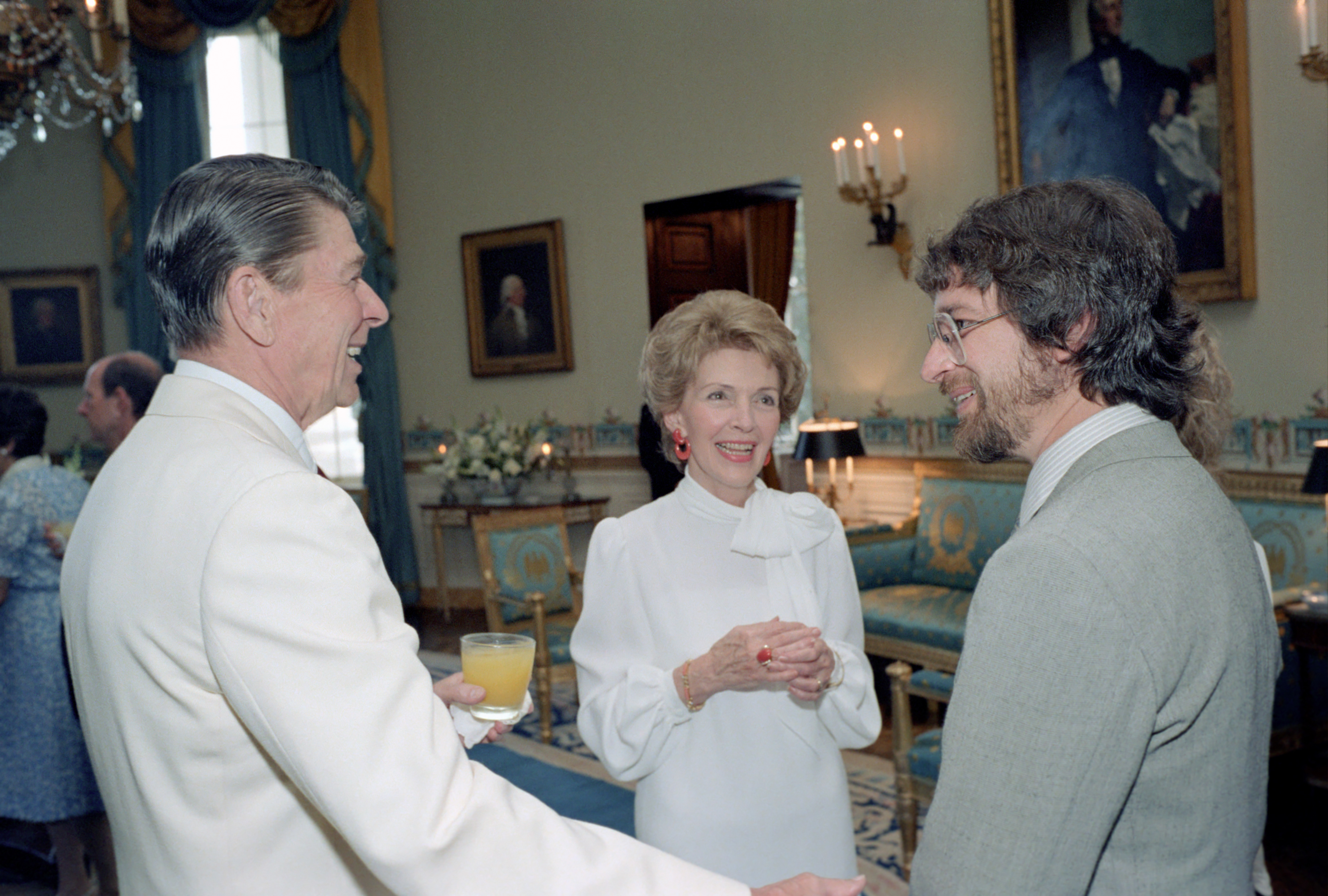
President Ronald Reagan and First Lady Nancy Reagan with Spielberg at The White House during a private dinner and showing of E.T. in 1982

Spielberg returned to science fiction with E.T. the Extra-Terrestrial (1982). It tells the story of Elliot (Henry Thomas), a young boy who befriends an alien who was left behind by his companions and is trying to return home. Spielberg eschewed storyboards so his direction would be more spontaneous and shot roughly in sequence so the actors' performances would be authentic as they bonded with E.T. Richard Corliss wrote, "This was the closing-night attraction at the 1982 Cannes Film Festival, a venue not known for blubbering sentiment. At the end, as the little critter bade his farewells and the Jules Verne-like space ship left the ground, the audience similarly levitated. One heard the audience's childlike applause; one felt their spirits lift. This was rapture made audible, palpable ... Spielberg orchestrated the movements of the camera and the puppet spaceman with the feelings of—it has to be called love—expressed in young Henry Thomas' yearning face. E.T. was the first film character to be a finalist in TIME's Man of the Year sweepstakes. It would have been fine with me if the little creature, this lovely film, had won."

A special screening was organized for Ronald and Nancy Reagan, who were emotional by the end. E.T. grossed $700 million worldwide. It won four Academy Awards: Best Original Score (John Williams), Best Sound (Robert Knudson, Robert Glass, Don Digirolamo and Gene Cantamessa), Best Sound Editing (Charles L. Campbell and Ben Burtt) and Best Visual Effects (Carlo Rambaldi, Dennis Muren and Kenneth F. Smith). Kael wrote of E.T., "His voice is ancient and otherworldly but friendly, humorous. And this scaly, wrinkled little man with huge, wide-apart, soulful eyes and a jack-in-the-box neck has been so fully created that he's a friend to us, too; when he speaks of his longing to go home the audience becomes as mournful as Elliot. Spielberg has earned the tears that some people in the audience—and not just children—shed. Genuinely entrancing movies are almost as rare as extraterrestrial visitors." Spielberg co-wrote and produced Poltergeist (Tobe Hooper, 1982), released the same summer as E.T. With John Landis, he produced the anthology film Twilight Zone: The Movie (1983), contributing the "Kick the Can" segment.

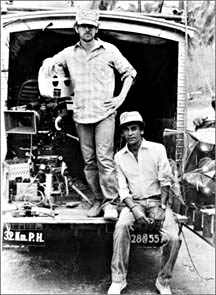
Spielberg and Chandran Rutnam in Sri Lanka during the filming of Indiana Jones and the Temple of Doom

His next film was the Raiders prequel Indiana Jones and the Temple of Doom (1984), shot in the US, Sri Lanka and China. It was darker than its predecessor, and led to the creation of the PG-13 rating because some content was deemed unsuitable for children under 13. Spielberg said he was unhappy with Temple of Doom because it lacked his "personal touches and love". Nonetheless, the film was a blockbuster hit, won the Academy Award for Best Visual Effects and got good reviews. Kael preferred it to the original, writing, "Spielberg is like a magician whose tricks are so daring they make you laugh. He creates an atmosphere of happy disbelief: the more breathtaking and exhilarating the stunts are the funnier they are. Nobody has ever fused thrills and laughter in quite the way that he does here. He starts off at full charge in the opening sequence and just keeps going". Ebert wrote "Indiana Jones and the Temple of Doom makes no apologies for being exactly what it is: Exhilarating, manic, wildly imaginative escapism. No apologies are necessary. This is the most cheerfully exciting, bizarre, goofy, romantic adventure movie since Raiders, and it is high praise to say that it’s not so much a sequel as an equal." On the project, Spielberg met his future wife, Kate Capshaw. Spielberg recalled, "It was a good learning exercise for me to really throw myself into a black hole. I came out of the darkness of Temple Of Doom and I entered the light of the woman I was eventually going to marry and raise a family with."

Thomson writes that "At first sight, the Spielberg of the eighties may seem more an impresario—or a studio, even—than a director." Between 1984 and 1990, Spielberg served as producer or executive producer on nineteen films. In the early 1980s, Spielberg befriended Warner Communications CEO Steve Ross, leading Spielberg to make films for Warner Bros. The first was The Color Purple (1985), an adaptation of Alice Walker's novel about a generation of empowered African-American women in the Depression-era South. It was Spielberg's first film on a dramatic subject, and he expressed reservations about tackling the project: "It's the risk of being judged-and accused of not having the sensibility to do character studies." Starring Whoopi Goldberg and Oprah Winfrey, the film was a box-office hit and critics started to take note of Spielberg's foray into drama. Ebert named it the best film of the year. The film received eleven Academy Award nominations and Spielberg won Best Director from the Directors Guild of America.

As China underwent economic reform and opened up to the American film industry, Spielberg made Empire of the Sun (1987), the first American film shot in Shanghai since the 1930s. It is an adaptation of J. G. Ballard's autobiographical novel about Jamie Graham (Christian Bale), a boy who goes from being the son of a wealthy British family in Shanghai to a prisoner of war in a Japanese internment camp during World War II. David Lean was originally set to direct, with Spielberg producing. It was written by Tom Stoppard and co-starred John Malkovich as an American expatriate. Critical reaction was mixed; criticism ranged from the "overwrought" plot to Spielberg's downplaying of "disease and starvation". However, Andrew Sarris named it the best film of the year and one of the best of the decade. He wrote: "The film is a fusion of kinesthetic energy with literary sensibility, pulse-pounding adventure with exquisitely delicate sensitivity.” Corliss wrote that "Spielberg has energized each frame with allusive legerdemain and an intelligent density of images and emotions." It was a disappointment at the box office, possibly because it was released around the same time as John Boorman's similarly themed Hope and Glory. The film was nominated for six Academy Awards,; Ian Alterman, in The New York Times thought it had been overlooked. Spielberg recalled that Empire of the Sun was one of his most enjoyable films to make. Thomson called it "a great work through and through" and "the first clear sign that Spielberg the showman was an artist, too."

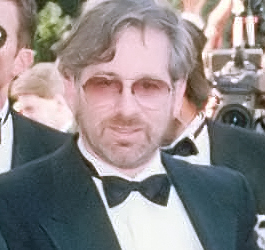
Spielberg, March 1990

Spielberg intended to direct Rain Man but instead made Indiana Jones and the Last Crusade (1989) to meet his contractual obligations. A longtime James Bond fan, Spielberg cast Sean Connery as Jones's father, Henry Jones, Sr. Due to complaints about violence in Temple of Doom, Spielberg returned to more family-friendly fare for the third installment. Last Crusade received positive reviews and was a box-office success, earning $474 million; it was his biggest hit since E.T. Joseph McBride called it a comeback for Spielberg, and Spielberg acknowledged how much he has learned from the Indiana Jones films. Ebert wrote that "Raiders of the Lost Ark, now more than ever, seems a turning point in the cinema of escapist entertainment, and there was really no way Spielberg could make it new all over again. What he has done is to take many of the same elements, and apply all of his craft and sense of fun to make them work yet once again. And they do."

That year, he reunited with Richard Dreyfuss for the romantic drama Always, about an aerial firefighter. It is a modern remake of one of Spielberg's favorite childhood films, A Guy Named Joe (1943). He said, "As a child I was very frustrated, and maybe I saw my own parents [in A Guy Named Joe]. I was also short of girlfriends. And it stuck with me." Spielberg had discussed the film with Dreyfuss in 1975, and up to twelve drafts were written before filming commenced. It costarred Holly Hunter and John Goodman and was the final film role for Audrey Hepburn. Janet Maslin wrote that while "Always is filled with big, sentimental moments, it lacks the intimacy to make any of this very moving."

After a brief setback in which he felt "artistically stalled", Spielberg returned with Hook (1991), about a middle-aged Peter Pan (Robin Williams), who returns to Neverland and encounters Tinker Bell (Julia Roberts) and the eponymous Captain Hook (Dustin Hoffman). The stars clashed on set, and Spielberg told 60 Minutes that he would never work with Roberts again. The studio enjoyed the film but most critics did not; Desson Howe described it as "too industrially organized". At the box office, it earned more than $300 million worldwide from a $70 million budget.

=== 1993–1998: Oscar winner ===
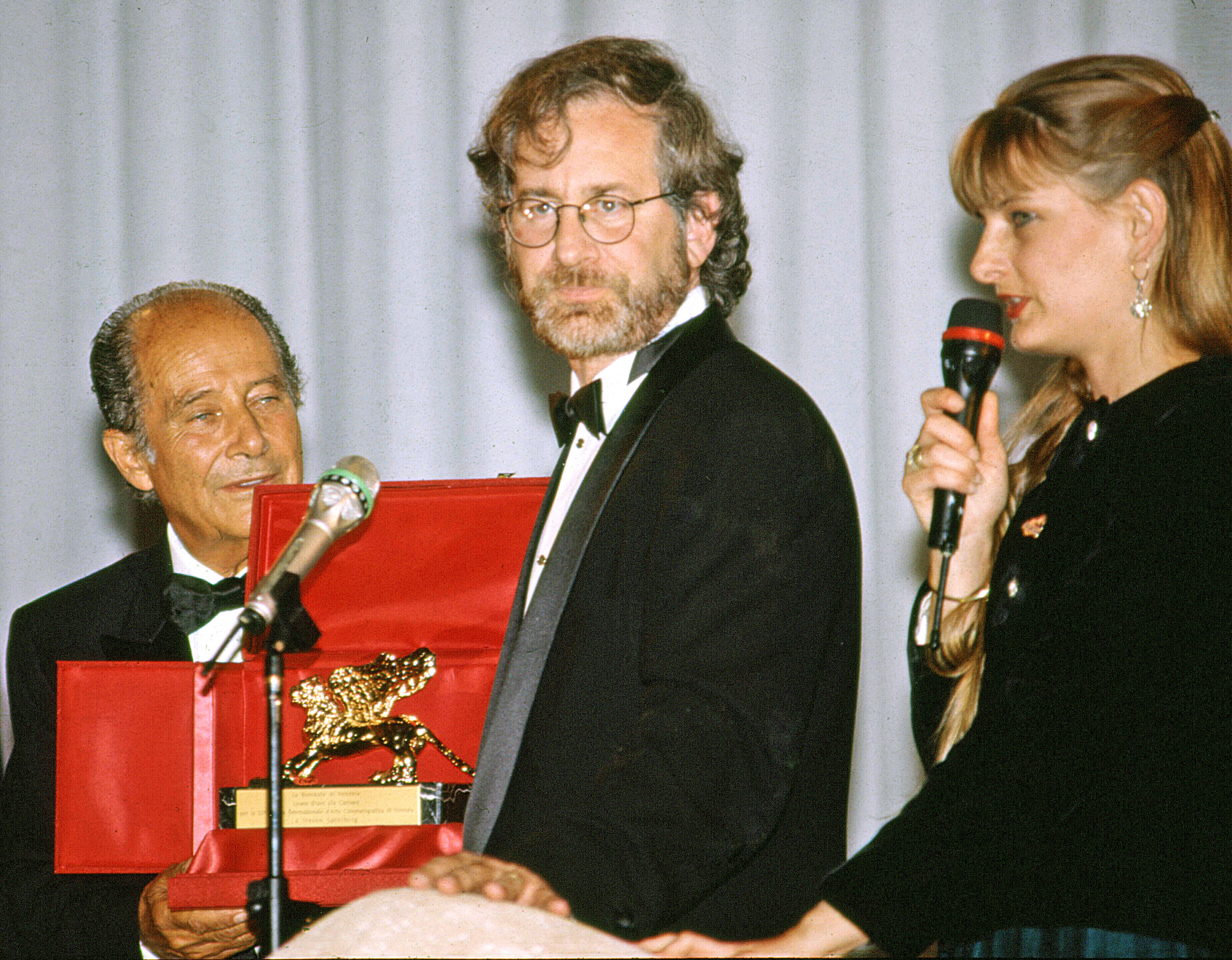
Spielberg receiving the Golden Lion by Italian filmmaker Gillo Pontecorvo at the 50th Venice International Film Festival, 1993

In 1993, Spielberg returned with Jurassic Park, based on Michael Crichton's bestseller, with a screenplay by Crichton and David Koepp. Jurassic Park follows John Hammond (Richard Attenborough), who has hired geneticists to create a wildlife park of de-extinct dinosaurs. It features Sam Neill and Laura Dern as paleontologists and Jeff Goldblum as mathematiican Ian Malcolm. In a departure from his usual order of planning, Spielberg and the designers storyboarded certain sequences from the novel early on. The film combined practical effects by Stan Winston and computer-generated imagery provided by Industrial Light & Magic; Jurassic Park eclipsed E.T. as the highest-grossing film to date, and won three Academy Awards.

That year, Spielberg directed Schindler's List, about Oskar Schindler, a businessman who helped save 1,100 Jews from The Holocaust. Spielberg waited ten years to make the film as he did not feel "mature" enough. He wanted to embrace his heritage, and after the birth of his son, Max, he said that "it greatly affected me [...] A spirit began to ignite in me, and I became a Jewish dad". Principal photography began on March 1, 1993, in Kraków, Poland, while Spielberg supervised the post-production of Jurassic Park. To make filming "bearable", Spielberg brought his wife and children with him. Schindler's List won seven Academy Awards, including Best Picture and Spielberg's first as Best Director. It also won seven BAFTAs, and three Golden Globes.

Ebert wrote, "Flaubert once wrote that he disliked Uncle Tom's Cabin because the author was constantly preaching against slavery. 'Does one have to make observations about slavery?' he asked. 'Depict it; that's enough.' And then he added, 'An author in his book must be like God in the universe, present everywhere and visible nowhere.' That would describe Spielberg, the author of this film. He depicts the evil of the Holocaust, and he tells an incredible story of how it was robbed of some of its intended victims. He does so without the tricks of his trade, the directorial and dramatic contrivances that would inspire the usual melodramatic payoffs. Spielberg is not visible in this film. But his restraint and passion are present in every shot." Filmmaker Claude Lanzmann criticized the film for its weak representation of the Holocaust. Imre Kertész, a Hungarian author and concentration camp survivor, disliked the film, saying, "I regard as kitsch any representation of the Holocaust that is incapable of understanding or unwilling to understand the organic connection between our own deformed mode of life and the very possibility of the Holocaust." Thomson calls it "the most moving film I have ever seen."

Spielberg used his percentage of profits to start the Shoah Foundation, a non-profit organization that archives testimonies of Holocaust survivors.In response to meeting Holocaust survivors during the filming of Schindler's List, Spielberg decided to use some of the proceeds from the film to establish the Survivors of the Shoah Visual History Foundation in 1994. The goal was to record the testimonies of survivors "before it was too late". Over 50,000 survivors were recorded. In 2006 the foundation transferred its archives to the University of Southern California and the name was changed to the Visual History Archive (VHA) at the USC Shoah Foundation.

In 1994, Spielberg took a hiatus to spend more time with his family, and set up his new film studio, DreamWorks, with Jeffrey Katzenberg and David Geffen. He returned with The Lost World: Jurassic Park (1997). A loose adaptation of Michael Crichton's novel, it follows Ian Malcolm and his researchers who study dinosaurs at Jurassic Park and are confronted by another team with a different agenda. Spielberg wanted the onscreen creatures to be more realistic than in the first film. Budgeted at $73 million, The Lost World: Jurassic Park opened in May 1997 and was one of the highest grossing films of the year. J. Hoberman called it "better crafted but less fun" than the first film, while The Guardian wrote "It looks like a director on autopilot [...] The special effects brook no argument."

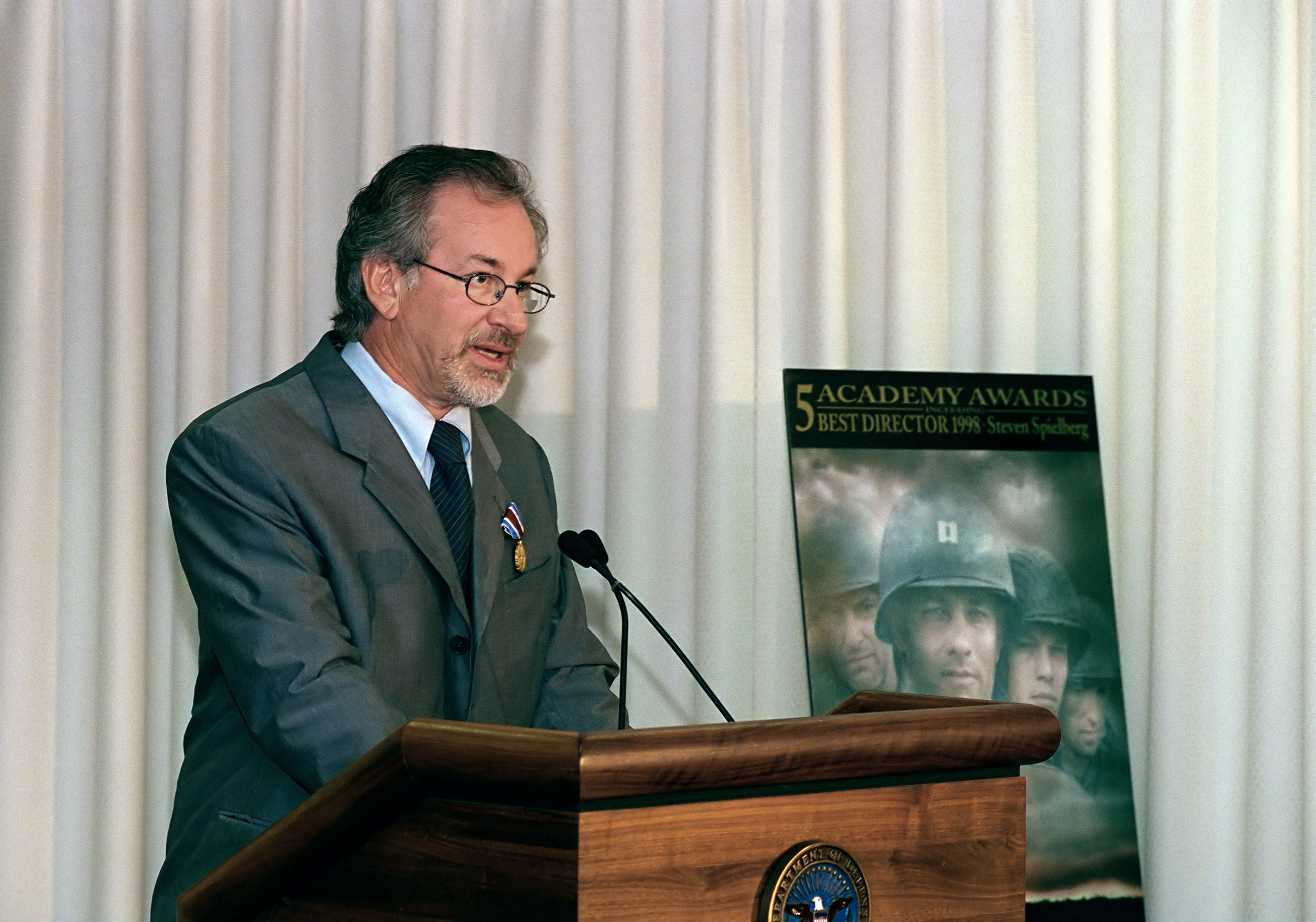
Spielberg speaking at the Pentagon on August 11, 1999, after receiving the Department of Defense Medal for Distinguished Public Service

Amistad (1997), his first film released under DreamWorks, was based on the true story of the events in 1839 aboard the slave ship La Amistad. Producer Debbie Allen, who had read the book Amistad I in 1978, thought Spielberg would be perfect to direct. Spielberg was hesitant taking on the project, afraid it would be compared to Schindler's List, but said, "I've never planned my career [...] In the end I do what I think I gotta do." Starring Morgan Freeman, Anthony Hopkins, Djimon Hounsou and Matthew McConaughey, Spielberg used Allen's ten years worth of research to reenact the difficult historical scenes. The film struggled to find an audience, and underperformed at the box office; Spielberg admitted that Amistad "became too much of a history lesson".

Saving Private Ryan (1998) follows a group of US soldiers led by Captain Miller (Tom Hanks) sent to bring home a paratrooper whose three brothers were killed in the same twenty-four hours of the Normandy landing. Filming took place in England, and US Marine Dale Dye was hired to train the actors and keep them in character during combat scenes. Halfway through filming, Spielberg reminded the cast they were making a tribute to thank "your grandparents and my dad, who fought in [the war]". Critics praised the direction and its realistic portrayal of war. The film grossed a successful $481 million worldwide and Spielberg won a second Academy Award for Best Director. In August 1999, Spielberg and Hanks were awarded the Distinguished Public Service Medal from Secretary of Defense William S. Cohen. Thomson writes "Ryan changed war films: combat, shock, wounds, and fear had never been so graphically presented; and yet there was also a true sense of what duties and ideas had felt like in 1944. I disliked the framing device. I would have admired a director who trusted us to get there without that. Never mind—Ryan is a magnificent film." Ebert wrote "Spielberg knows how to make audiences weep better than any director since Chaplin in City Lights. But weeping is an incomplete response, letting the audience off the hook. This film embodies ideas. After the immediate experience begins to fade, the implications remain and grow."

=== 1999–2012: Master of technology ===
Spielberg returned to science fiction with A.I. Artificial Intelligence (2001), a loose adaptation of Brian Aldiss's short story "Supertoys Last All Summer Long" (1969). Stanley Kubrick had bought the rights to the story in 1979 and worked on an adaptation for years. He told Spielberg about the project in 1984 and suggested that he direct, believing the story was closer to Spielberg's sensibilities. Following Kubrick's death in 1999, Spielberg decided to direct A.I. Spielberg tried to be faithful to Kubrick's vision and made allusions to his friend's work. The plot revolves around an android, David (Haley Joel Osment) who, like Pinocchio, dreams of being a "real boy". The film won five Saturn Awards and grossed $236 million worldwide. Jonathan Rosenbaum highly praised the film: "If A.I. Artificial Intelligence — a film whose split personality is apparent even in its two-part title — is as much a Kubrick movie as a Spielberg one, this is in large part because it defamiliarizes Spielberg, makes him strange. Yet it also defamiliarizes Kubrick, with equally ambiguous results — making his unfamiliarity familiar. Both filmmakers should be credited for the results—Kubrick for proposing that Spielberg direct the project and Spielberg for doing his utmost to respect Kubrick's intentions while making it a profoundly personal work." A. O. Scott called it "the best fairy tale–the most disturbing, complex and intellectually challenging boy's adventure story–Mr. Spielberg has made" and chose it as the best film of the year and one of the best of the decade.

Spielberg followed A.I. with Minority Report (2002), based on Philip K. Dick's 1956 short story. The film stars Tom Cruise as commanding officer of precrime in a futuristic Washington, D.C. Ebert named Minority Report the best film of 2002, praising its craftsmanship: "here is Spielberg using every trick in the book and matching them without seams, so that no matter how he's achieving his effects, the focus is always on the story and the characters ... Some directors place their trust in technology. Spielberg, who is a master of technology, trusts only story and character, and then uses everything else as a workman uses his tools." The film earned more than $358 million worldwide. Also in 2002, he released Catch Me If You Can, based on the autobiography of con-artist Frank Abagnale. Leonardo DiCaprio played Abagnale; Christopher Walken and Hanks also starred. Spielberg said, "I have always loved movies about sensational rogues—they break the law, but you just have to love them for the moxie." The film was a critical and commercial success. That year, he returned to Long Beach, presenting Schindler's List to complete his Bachelor of Arts in Film and Electronic Media.

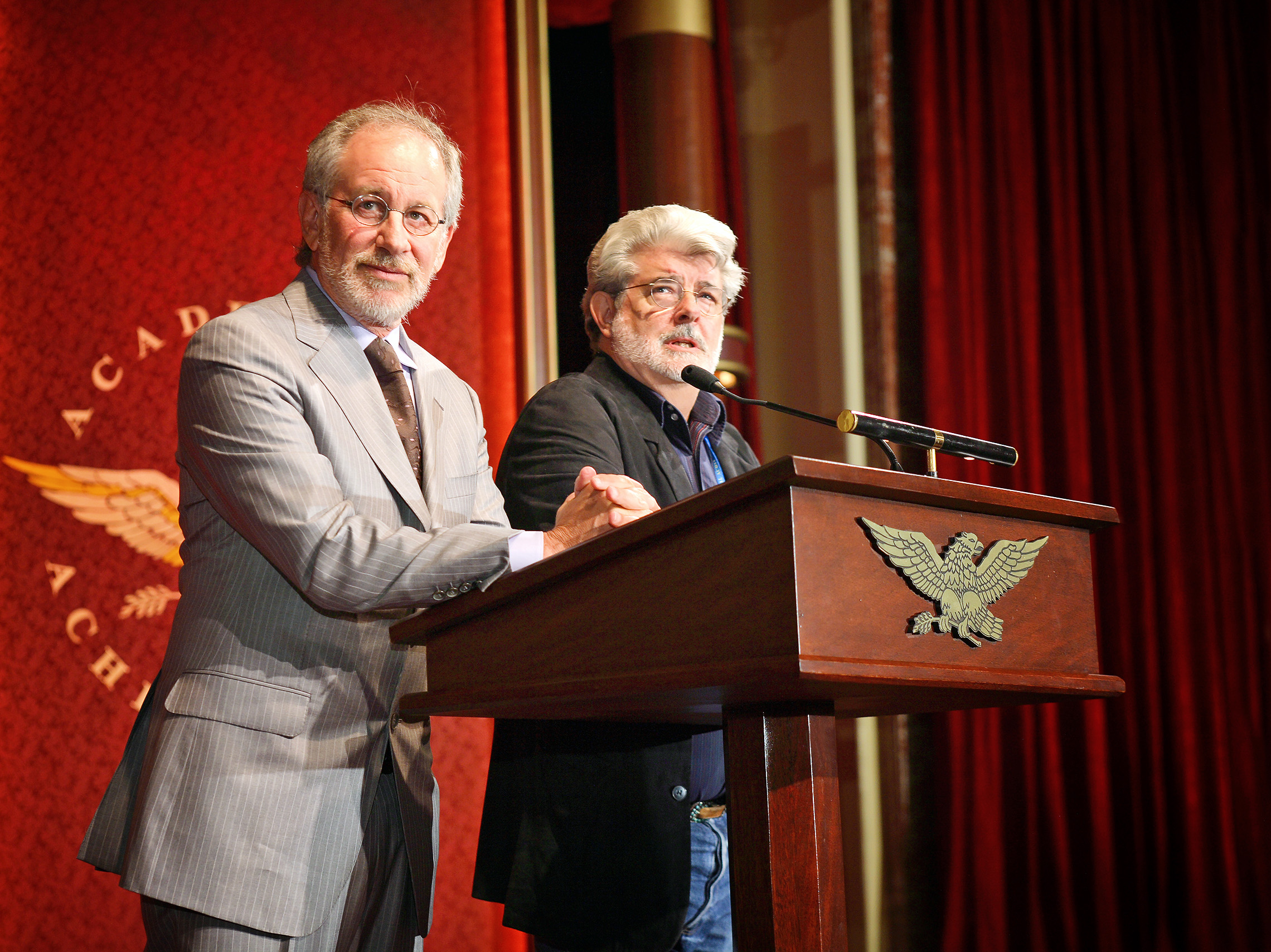
Spielberg with director and friend George Lucas in 2006

Spielberg followed Catch Me If You Can with The Terminal (2004), a comedy inspired by the true story of Mehran Karimi Nasseri and by Jacques Tati's Playtime (1967). The film follows Viktor Navorski (Hanks), an Eastern European man who, after a coup in his home country, is stranded in John F. Kennedy International Airport. It features Catherine Zeta-Jones as a flight attendant and Stanley Tucci as a customs and immigration official. Ebert wrote of Viktor's predicament: "The immigration service, and indeed the American legal system, has no way of dealing with him because Viktor does not do, or fail to do, any of the things the system is set up to prevent him from doing, or not doing. He has slipped through a perfect logical loophole. The Terminal is like a sunny Kakfa story, in which it is the citizen who persecutes the bureaucracy." The titular terminal was a real set built by Alex McDowell. In 2005, Spielberg directed War of the Worlds, a co-production of Paramount and DreamWorks, based on H. G. Wells's novel; Spielberg had been a fan of the book and of George Pal's 1953 film. The film follows an American dock worker (Cruise) who is forced to look after his children, from whom he lives separately, as he tries to reunite them with their mother when extraterrestrials invade Earth. Spielberg used storyboards to help the actors react to computer imagery and used natural lighting and camerawork to avoid an "over stylized" science fiction picture. The film grossed more than $600 million worldwide.

Spielberg's Munich (2005) is about the Israeli government's secret retaliation after 11 Israeli Olympic athletes were murdered in the 1972 Munich massacre. The film is based on Vengeance, a book by journalist George Jonas. It was previously adapted for the screen in the 1986 television film Sword of Gideon. Spielberg, who personally remembers the incident, sought advice from former president Bill Clinton, among others, before making the film, because he did not want to cause further problems in the Middle East. Although the film garnered mostly positive reviews, some critics perceived it as antisemitic; it is one of Spielberg's most controversial films. Munich received five Academy Awards nominations: Best Picture, Best Film Editing, Best Score, Best Adapted Screenplay and Best Director.

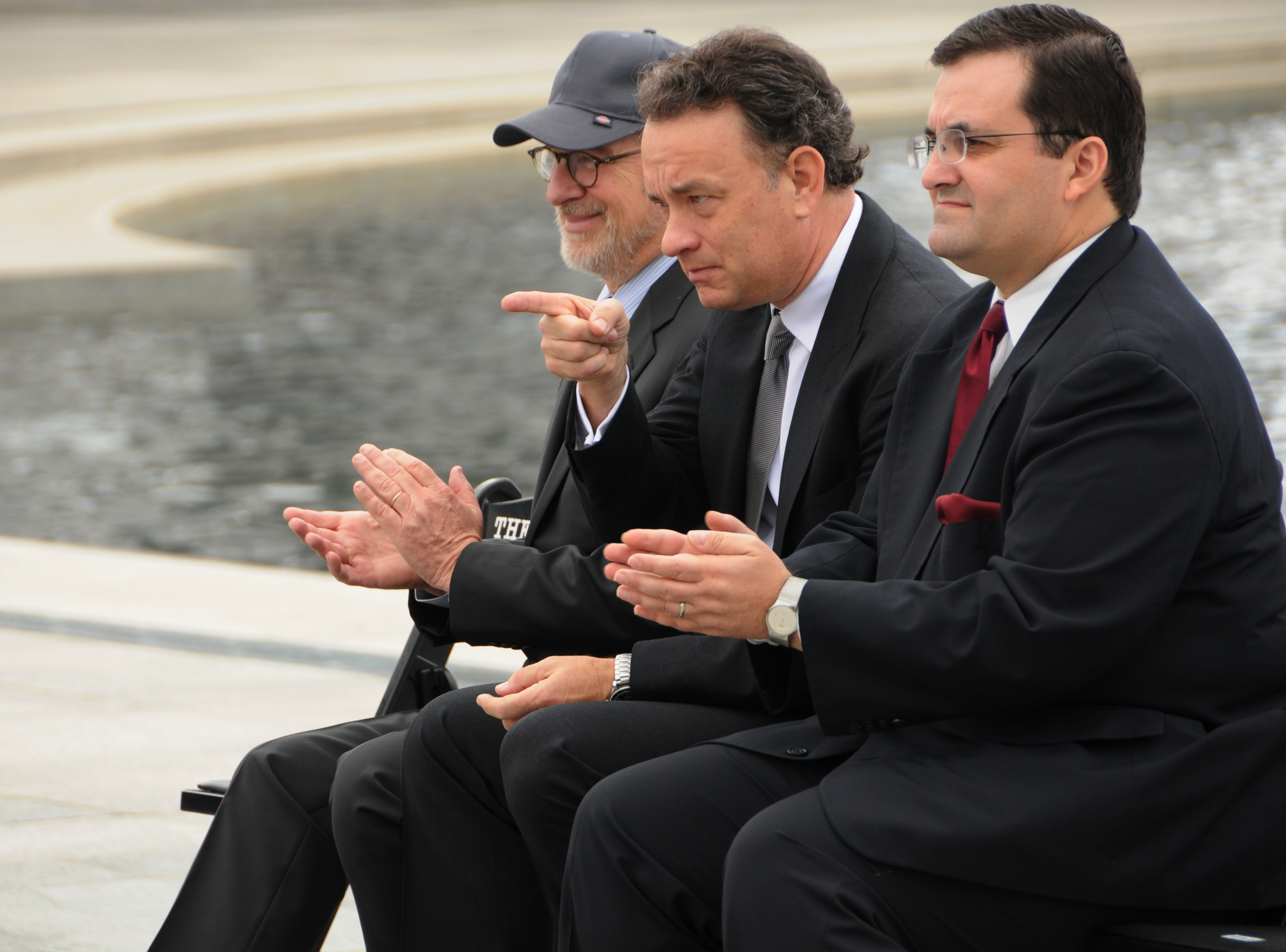
Spielberg with Tom Hanks promoting The Pacific in Washington, D.C.

In the mid-2000s, Spielberg scaled down his directing career and became more selective about film projects. In December 2005, he and his partners sold DreamWorks to conglomerate Viacom. In June 2006, Spielberg planned to make Interstellar, but abandoned the project, which was eventually directed by Christopher Nolan. Spielberg remained active as a producer. Spielberg returned to the Indiana Jones series in 2008 with Indiana Jones and the Kingdom of the Crystal Skull. Released 19 years after Last Crusade, the film is set in 1957, pitting Indiana Jones against KGB agents led by Irina Spalko (Cate Blanchett), searching for a telepathic crystal skull. Principal photography was complete in October 2007, and the film was released in May 2008. This was his first film not released by DreamWorks since 1997. The film received generally favorable reviews from critics, but some fans were disappointed by the introduction of science fiction elements uncharacteristic of the previous films. Tom Ryan praised Spielberg and Lucas for their realistic 1950s setting. It was a box-office success, grossing $790 million worldwide.

In 2009, Spielberg started shooting the first film in a planned trilogy of motion capture films based on Hergé's The Adventures of Tintin. Spielberg had long been a fan of the comics and, per Michael Farr, Hergé "thought Spielberg was the only person who could ever do Tintin justice." The Adventures of Tintin: The Secret of the Unicorn was co-produced by Peter Jackson and premiered in Brussels. The film was released in North American theaters on December 21, 2011, in Digital 3D and IMAX. It received generally positive reviews from critics and grossed over $373 million worldwide. The Adventures of Tintin won Best Animated Effects and Best Music at the 39th Annie Awards. Ebert wrote "Tintin is an ambitious and lively caper, miles smarter than your average 3-D family film." Paraphrasing Hergé's Captain Haddock, he added "I give it 875 portholes."

Spielberg followed Tintin with War Horse (2011), an adaptation of Michael Morpurgo's novel. It follows the friendship between a British boy and his horse Joey before and during World War I. Distributed by Walt Disney Studios with whom DreamWorks made a distribution deal in 2009, War Horse was the first of four consecutive Spielberg films released by Disney. It received acclaim from critics and was nominated for six Academy Awards, including Best Picture. Andrew O'Hehir wrote, "at this point in his career Spielberg is pursuing personal goals, and everything that's terrific and overly flat and tooth-rottingly sweet about War Horse reflects that."

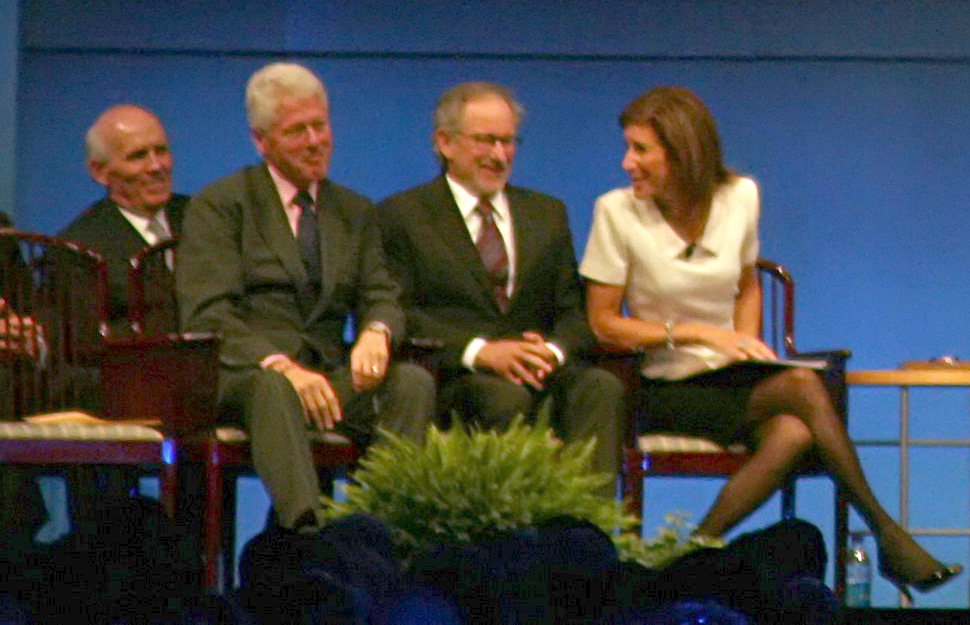
Spielberg with Bill Clinton, 2009

Spielberg directed the historical drama Lincoln (2012), starring Daniel Day-Lewis as President Abraham Lincoln and Sally Field as Mary Todd Lincoln. Based on Doris Kearns Goodwin's book Team of Rivals: The Political Genius of Abraham Lincoln and written by Tony Kushner, the film depicts the final four months of Lincoln's life. The film was shot in Richmond, Virginia in late 2011. and was released in the US in November 2012. Lincoln was acclaimed and earned more than $250 million worldwide. It was nominated for twelve Academy Awards, including Best Picture and Best Director, winning Best Production Design and Best Actor. Donald Clarke from The Irish Times wrote "Against the odds, Spielberg makes something genuinely exciting of the backstage wheedling."

=== 2013–present: Recent work ===
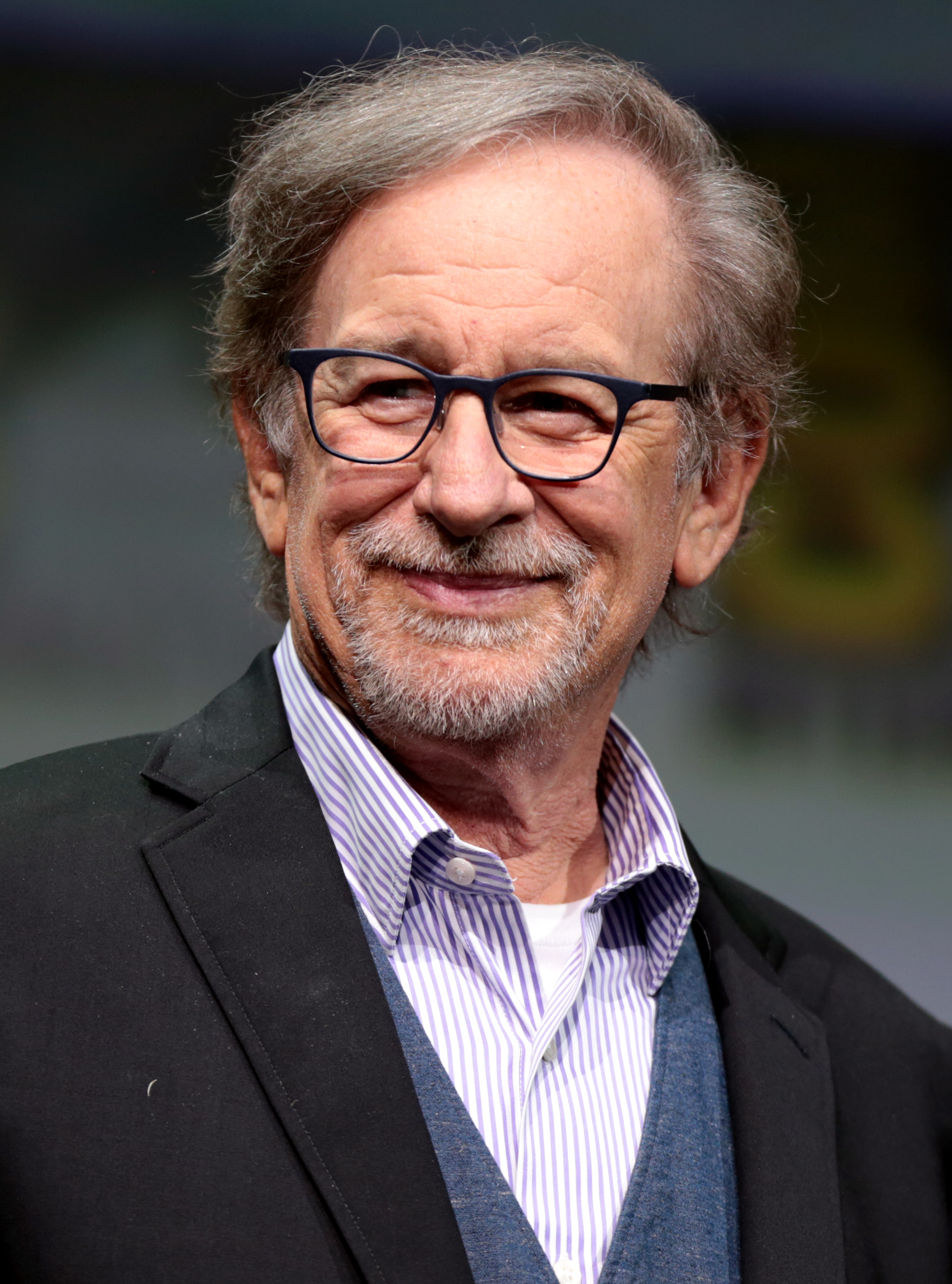
Spielberg in 2017.

Bridge of Spies (2015) is a Cold War thriller based on the 1960 U-2 incident, focusing on James B. Donovan's negotiations with the Soviets for the release of pilot Gary Powers after his aircraft was shot down over Soviet territory. It was written by Matt Charman and the Coen brothers and starred Tom Hanks, Mark Rylance, Amy Ryan and Alan Alda. It was filmed in the fall of 2014 in New York City, Berlin and Wrocław. Bridge of Spies was popular with critics and Rylance won Best Supporting Actor at the 88th Academy Awards.

The BFG (2016) is an adaptation of Roald Dahl's children's book, starring Mark Rylance as the titular Big Friendly Giant and newcomer Ruby Barnhill. DreamWorks bought the rights in 2010, and John Madden had intended to direct. It was the last film written by E.T. screenwriter Melissa Mathison. It was co-produced and released by Walt Disney Pictures, marking the first Disney-branded film directed by Spielberg. The BFG premiered out-of-competition at the 2016 Cannes Film Festival, and received a wide release in the US on July 1, 2016. The BFG received fair reviews; Michael Phillips of The Chicago Tribune compared certain scenes to the works of Alfred Hitchcock and Stanley Kubrick, while Liz Braun thought that there were "moments of wonder and delight" but it was too long.

The Post (2017) is an account of The Washington Post's printing of the Pentagon Papers. Starring Tom Hanks and Meryl Streep, production began in New York on May 30, 2017. Spielberg stated his attraction to the project: "When I read the first draft of the script, this wasn't something that could wait three years or two years—this was a story I felt we needed to tell today." It received a wide release on January 12, 2018. The Post gained positive reception; Lindsey Bahr wrote "Spielberg infuses every scene with tension and life and the grandeur of the ordinary that he's always been so good at conveying." In 2017, Spielberg, Paul Greengrass, Francis Ford Coppola, Guillermo del Toro and Lawrence Kasdan were featured in the Netflix documentary series Five Came Back, about the war-related works of directors Frank Capra, John Ford, John Huston, George Stevens and William Wyler. He executive produced the series with Barry Diller and Scott Rudin.

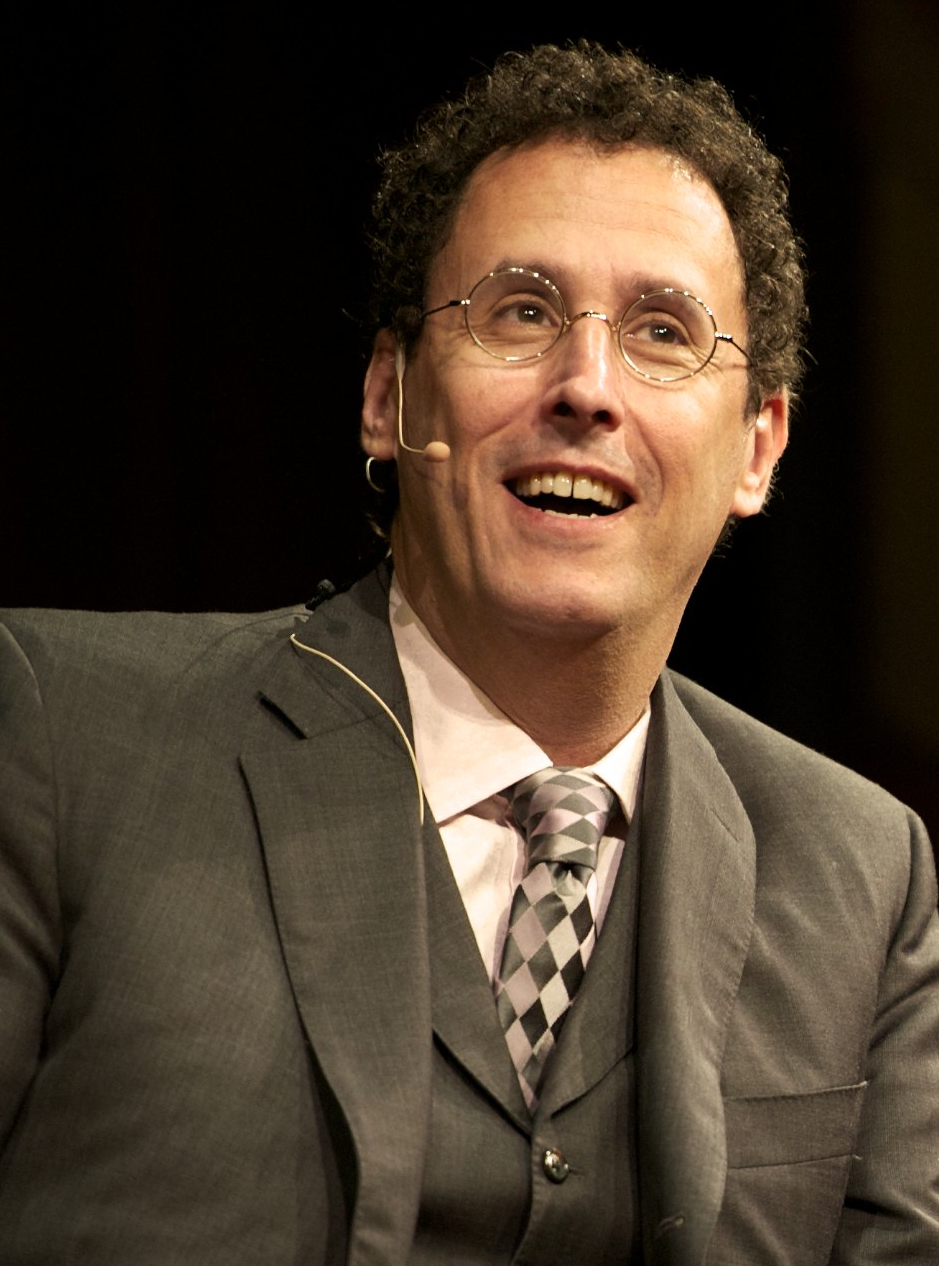
Spielberg collaborated with playwright Tony Kushner for West Side Story (2021) and The Fabelmans (2022)

Spielberg directed Ready Player One (2018), adapted from Ernest Cline's novel. It stars Tye Sheridan, Olivia Cooke, Ben Mendelsohn, Lena Waithe, T.J. Miller, Simon Pegg and Mark Rylance. The plot takes place in 2045 when much of humanity uses virtual reality to escape the real world. Ready Player One began production in July 2016, and was intended to be released on December 15, 2017, but was moved to March 2018 to avoid competition with Star Wars: The Last Jedi. It premiered at the 2018 South by Southwest film festival. Spielberg's direction was praised along with the action scenes and visual effects, but many critics thought it was too long and overused 1980s nostalgia.

In 2019, Spielberg filmed West Side Story, an adaptation of the musical by Leonard Bernstein and Stephen Sondheim. It stars Ansel Elgort and Rachel Zegler in her film debut, with Ariana DeBose, David Alvarez, Mike Faist and Rita Moreno in supporting roles. Written by Tony Kushner, the film stays true to the original 1950s setting. West Side Story was released in December 2021 to positive reviews and received seven Academy Award nominations, including Best Picture and Best Director. Spielberg also received nominations from the Golden Globe Awards, Directors Guild of America, and Critics' Choice Movie Awards. The Economist praised the choreography, stating that it "stunningly melds beauty and violence". In March 2022, Spielberg said that West Side Story would be his last musical.

Spielberg's The Fabelmans (2022) is a self-portrait of the director as a young man, which he wrote with Kushner. Gabriel LaBelle plays Sammy Fabelman, an aspiring filmmaker. Michelle Williams plays his mother, Mitzi; Paul Dano his father, Burt; Seth Rogen plays Burt's best friend Bennie Loewy and Judd Hirsch plays Mitzi's Uncle Boris. It features a cameo from David Lynch. Filming began in Los Angeles in July 2021, and it premiered at the 2022 Toronto International Film Festival on September 10, Spielberg's debut at that festival. It received widespread critical acclaim and won the festival's People's Choice Award. It received a limited theatrical release on November 11, 2022, by Universal Pictures, before expanding wide on November 23.

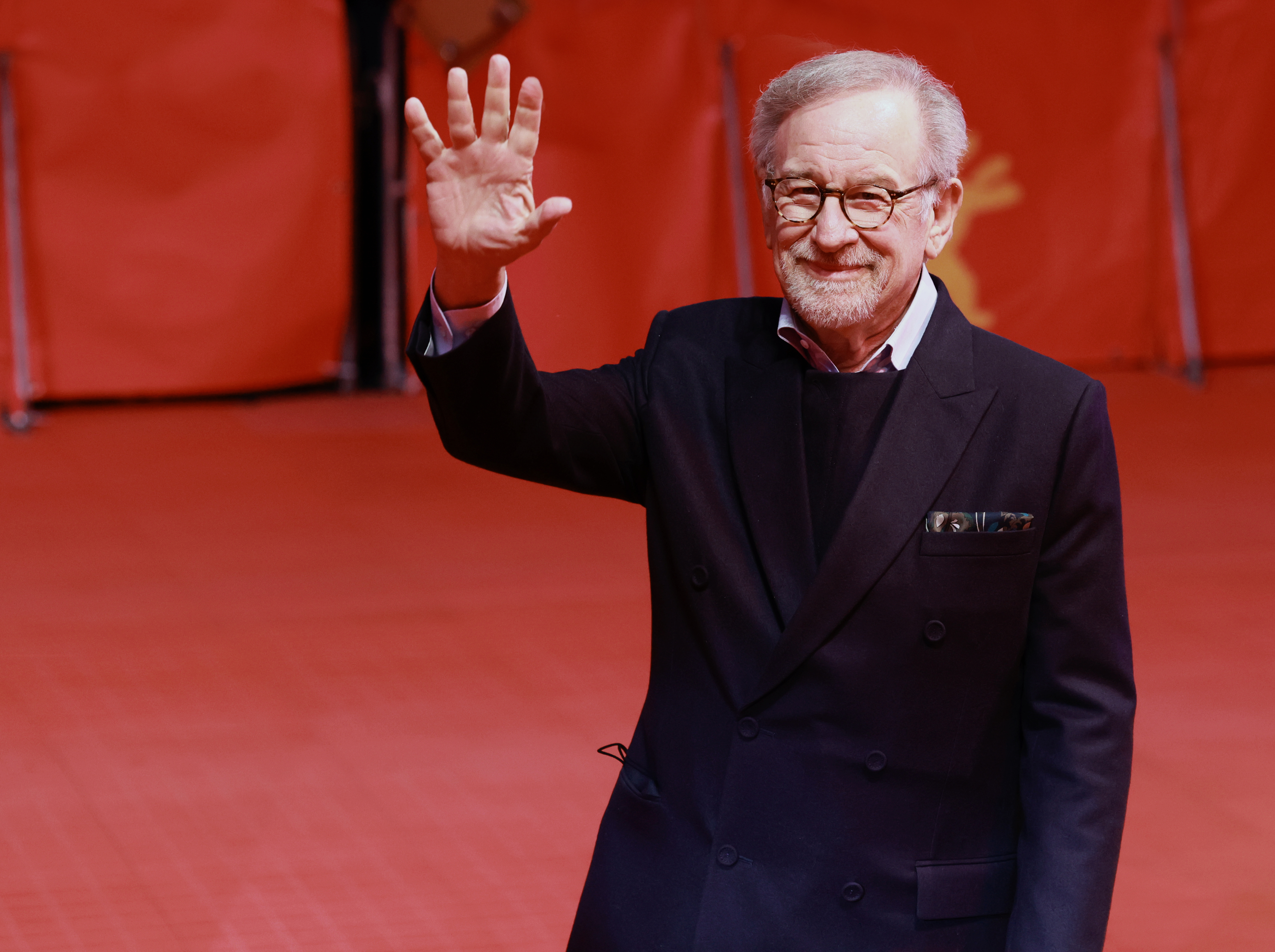
Spielberg at Berlinale at 2023

Despite favorable critical reception, West Side Story and The Fabelmans were box-office failures, which Variety suggested could be attributed to a decline in the popularity of Spielberg in a film-going environment altered by the COVID-19 pandemic, and the public's loss of interest in prestige films. The Fabelmans received seven Academy Award nominations, including Best Picture, Best Director and Best Original Screenplay. It was, however, a major box office success in France and became the highest-rated film of the 21st century in the country, with a 4.9 average from critics on AlloCiné from 43 reviews, with all but six giving it 5 stars. Cahiers du Cinéma wrote that Spielberg had "come to represent like no other, the idea of cinema as wonder, at a time when the relationship to the spectacular and the cinema seems more tormented than ever" and declared that it will "undoubtedly remain the most important and singular film of his career".

Spielberg had planned to direct Indiana Jones and the Dial of Destiny, but withdrew and was replaced by James Mangold. Spielberg said that he would remain "hands on" as a producer, along with Kathleen Kennedy and Frank Marshall. In 2016, it was announced that it would be written by David Koepp, with a release by Disney on July 19, 2019. After a change of filming and release dates, it was postponed again when Jonathan Kasdan was announced as the film's new writer. Soon after, a new release date of July 9, 2021, was announced. In May 2019, Dan Fogelman was hired to write a new script, and Kasdan's story, focused on the Nazi gold train, would not be used; the script was ultimately credited to Mangold, Koepp, Jez Butterworth, and John-Henry Butterworth. In April 2020, it was announced that the release was delayed to July 29, 2022, due to the COVID-19 pandemic, and in October 2021, the release date was again delayed to June 30, 2023. The film began production in the UK in June 2021 and finished in February 2022.

In February 2025, Spielberg began shooting Disclosure Day, about UFOs. The screenplay was written by Koepp, from an original idea from Spielberg. It stars Emily Blunt, Josh O'Connor, Colman Domingo, Colin Firth, Wyatt Russell and Eve Hewson, and was released in theatres on June 12, 2026, by Universal Pictures.

== Other ventures ==
=== Production ===
Spielberg's first film as an executive producer was the directorial debut of Robert Zemeckis, I Wanna Hold Your Hand (1978). He produced Zemeckis's dark comedy Used Cars (1980), which was a critical but not a commercial success. In 1980, Spielberg, Kathleen Kennedy and Frank Marshall founded Amblin Productions; the first film it produced was the romantic comedy Continental Divide (Michael Apted, 1981). It went on to produce Gremlins (Joe Dante, 1984), The Goonies (Richard Donner, 1985), Back to the Future (Zemeckis, 1985), Who Framed Roger Rabbit (Zemeckis, 1988), Arachnophobia (Marshall, 1990), Joe Versus the Volcano (John Patrick Shanley, 1990), Twister (Jan de Bont, 1996), Men in Black (Barry Sonnenfeld, 1997) and The Mask of Zorro (Martin Campbell, 1998). For some, including Young Sherlock Holmes (Barry Levinson, 1985) and Harry and the Hendersons (William Dear, 1987), the title "Steven Spielberg Presents" was in the opening credits. It produced Don Bluth's animated films An American Tail (1986) and The Land Before Time (1988), leading to the spin-off Amblimation. In 1985, NBC offered Spielberg a two-year contract on a television series, Amazing Stories; the show was marketed as a blend of The Twilight Zone and Alfred Hitchcock Presents. NBC gave Spielberg creative control and a budget of $1 million for each episode. After two seasons and disappointing ratings, the show was not renewed. Although Spielberg's involvement as a producer would vary widely from project to project, Zemeckis said that Spielberg would always "respect the filmmaker's vision". Over the next decade, Spielberg's record as a producer brought mixed critical and commercial results. He produced cartoons such as Brad Bird's Family Dog and Tom Ruegger's Animaniacs, Freakazoid! and Pinky and the Brain. In 1992, Spielberg began to scale back producing, saying "Producing has been the least fulfilling aspect of what I've done in the last decade." He produced the documentary A Brief History of Time by Errol Morris.

In 1993, Spielberg served as an executive producer for the NBC science fiction series seaQuest DSV; the show was not a hit. In 1994, he found success producing the medical drama ER. That year, Spielberg founded DreamWorks with Jeffrey Katzenberg and David Geffen. Spielberg cited greater creative control and distribution improvements as the main reasons for founding his own studio; he and his partners compared themselves to the founders of United Artists in 1919. DreamWorks' investors included Microsoft founders Paul Allen and Bill Gates. After founding DreamWorks, Spielberg continued to operate Amblin Entertainment and direct films for other studios. He helped design Jurassic Park: The Ride at Universal Studios Florida. The workload of filmmaking and operating a studio raised questions about his commitments, but Spielberg maintained that "this is all fitting nicely into my life and I'm still home by six and I'm still home on the weekends." In 1998, DreamWorks Animation produced its first full-length animated features, Antz and The Prince of Egypt. Shrek (2001) was the first winner of the Academy Award for Best Animated Feature.

Spielberg and Tom Hanks produced Band of Brothers (2001), a ten-part HBO miniseries based on Stephen E. Ambrose's book. It follows Easy Company of the 101st Airborne Division's 506th Parachute Infantry Regiment. It won a Golden Globe for Best Miniseries. He produced Memoirs of a Geisha (2005), an adaptation of Arthur Golden's novel. Spielberg and Zemeckis executive-produced Monster House (2006), marking their eighth collaboration. He co-produced Clint Eastwood's Flags of Our Fathers and Letters from Iwo Jima (2006). Spielberg served as executive producer for Disturbia, (2007) and the Transformers film series. That same year, Spielberg and Mark Burnett co-produced On the Lot, a reality and competition show about filmmaking. Spielberg returned to the World War II theme, co-producing the 2010 miniseries The Pacific with Hanks and Gary Goetzman. It is centered on the battles in the Pacific Theater. The next year, Spielberg co-created Falling Skies, a science fiction series on TNT, with Robert Rodat and produced the 2011 Fox series Terra Nova and J. J. Abrams's Super 8.

In January 2013, HBO confirmed that it was developing a World War II miniseries based on the book Donald L. Miller's Masters of the Air with Spielberg and Hanks. NME reported in March 2017 that production was under the working title The Mighty Eighth. By 2019, it was confirmed development of the miniseries, now titled Masters of the Air, had moved to Apple TV+. The series premiered on January 26, 2024. On January 18, 2023, Spielberg told press at a red carpet event for The Fabelmans that he was executive producing a documentary about John Williams, directed by Laurent Bouzereau with production companies Amblin Television, Imagine Documentaries, and Nedland Media. Other executive producers for the film include Brian Grazer, Ron Howard, Darryl Frank, Justin Falvey, Justin Wilkes, Sara Bernstein, and Meredith Kaulfers. The announcement came days after Williams suggested that he might not retire from film scoring as he had previously announced. The film, Music by John Williams, premiered at the 2024 AFI Fest.

=== Upcoming and prospective projects ===
In May 2009, Spielberg bought the rights to the life story of Martin Luther King Jr., with the intention of serving as both producer and director. The purchase was made from the King estate, led by son Dexter, while the two other surviving children, the Reverend Bernice and Martin III, immediately threatened to sue, not having given their approvals to the project. In March 2013, Spielberg announced that he was developing a miniseries based on the life of Napoleon. In May 2016, it was announced that Cary Joji Fukunaga was in talks to direct the miniseries for HBO, from a script by David Leland based on extensive research materials accumulated by Stanley Kubrick over the years.

Spielberg was set to film an adaptation of David I. Kertzer's The Kidnapping of Edgardo Mortara in early 2017, for release at the end of that year, but production was ultimately postponed. It was first announced in 2014, with Tony Kushner adapting the book for the screen. Mark Rylance, in his fourth collaboration with Spielberg, was announced to star in the role of Pope Pius IX. Spielberg saw more than 2,000 children to play the role of the young Edgardo Mortara. In 2015, it was announced that Spielberg was attached to direct an adaptation of American photojournalist Lynsey Addario's memoir It's What I Do, with Jennifer Lawrence in the lead role. In April 2018, it was announced that Spielberg would direct a film adaptation of the Blackhawk comic book series. Warner Bros. would distribute the film with David Koepp writing the script.

On June 21, 2021, it was announced that Amblin Entertainment signed a deal with Netflix to release multiple new feature films for the streaming service. Under the deal, Amblin is expected to produce at least two films a year for Netflix for an unspecified number of years. In February 2022, Deadline Hollywood reported that Spielberg was developing an original film centered around the character Frank Bullitt, a fictional San Francisco police officer originally portrayed by Steve McQueen in the 1968 film Bullitt. The screenplay is set to be written by Josh Singer, who previously co-wrote The Post for Spielberg. McQueen's son Chad and granddaughter Molly will serve as executive producers. Bradley Cooper was cast as Bullitt in November 2022 and will also serve as producer alongside Spielberg and Kristie Macosko Krieger.

On February 14, 2025, it was announced that The Goonies 2 was in the works with Spielberg producing. On November 6, 2025, it was announced that Spielberg will serve as an executive producer for Gremlins 3 which will be released on November 19, 2027.

During the 2026 South by Southwest, Spielberg confirmed that his next major project will be a Western film. He stated that it will subvert the classic mythology of the American frontier without relying on the genre's typical stereotypes.

=== Video games ===
Spielberg has been an avid gamer since 1974. He played many of LucasArts adventure games, including the first Monkey Island games.

In 1995, Spielberg helped create and design LucasArts' adventure game The Dig. He also collaborated with software publishers Knowledge Adventure on the game Steven Spielberg's Director's Chair, which was released in 1996; Spielberg appears in the game to direct the player.

In 2005, Spielberg collaborated with Electronic Arts (EA) on several games including one for the Wii called Boom Blox, and its sequel Boom Blox Bash Party. He is also the creator of EA's Medal of Honor series.

He dislikes the use of cutscenes in games, stating in a 2008 interview that "The second the game is returned to you and it's under your control, you forget everything the interstitials are trying to impact you with, and you just go back to shooting things, and that has not found its way into a universal narrative, and I think more has to be done in that arena. [...] I applaud them for at least attempting to tell a story."

=== Theatre ===
Spielberg first ventured into theatre producing in 1997, with his involvement on a production of The Diary of Anne Frank, as well as the original 1998 production of The Farnsworth Invention. In 2022, he made his Broadway producing debut as a co-producer on the musical A Strange Loop. He went on to produce the stage musical adaptations of Water for Elephants and Death Becomes Her alongside his wife Kate Capshaw, both in 2024. He will next co-produce the upcoming stage adaptation of Smash, based on the 2012 NBC television series of the same name, on which he served as an executive producer. It was set to begin performances in 2025.

== Style, themes and influences ==
"I didn't go to film school. I was self-taught. But I had great teachers, you know? All my influencers were the directors and the writers of the movies I was watching in theaters and on television. And my film school was really the cultural heritage of Hollywood and international filmmaking because there's no better teacher than Lubitsch or Hitchcock or Kurosawa or Kubrick, you know, or Ford or William Wyler or Billy Wilder or Clarence Brown – I mean, Val Lewton. I mean, those were my teachers."

— Steven Spielberg, Fresh Air interview

Spielberg cites John Ford as a formative influence: "I try to rent a John Ford film... before I start every movie, simply because he inspires me.... He's like a classic painter, he celebrates the frame, not just what's inside it." He names Frank Capra's It's A Wonderful Life (1946) as an influence on themes of "family, community and suburbia". He enjoyed the work of Alfred Hitchcock, David Lean, Stanley Kubrick and John Frankenheimer. In college, he was inspired by foreign films by Ingmar Bergman, Jacques Tati and François Truffaut, casting the last in Close Encounters of the Third Kind. Spencer Tracy has also influenced the characters of Spielberg's films. The Twilight Zone, with its mixing of the mundane and fantastic, was another influence. He says Lawrence of Arabia is the film he's seen more times than any other. With Martin Scorsese, Spielberg helped with Robert A. Harris's restoration of Lawrence. Among films by his contemporaries, Spielberg was floored by Francis Ford Coppola's The Godfather: "I was pulverized by the story and the effect the film had on me... I also felt that I should quit, that there was no reason I should continue directing because I would never achieve that level of confidence and ability to tell a story." In 2006, Coppola contacted Spielberg about restoring the film; Spielberg then contacted Paramount studio head Brad Grey, who approved the project (it was released in 2008). In 1982, Spielberg bought one of the props from Citizen Kane. Spielberg called Kane "the most classic movie ever made" and the sled "a symbolic emblem of quality in the film business".

=== Method and themes ===
Spielberg often uses storyboards to visualize sequences, eschewing them for E.T. and The Color Purple for a more spontaneous effect. After filming Jaws, Spielberg learned to save special effects scenes until last and to exclude the media from filming locations. Spielberg prefers to shoot quickly, with large amounts of footage so that he will have many options in the editing room. From the beginning of his career, Spielberg's shooting style consisted of extreme high and low camera angles, long takes and handheld cameras. He favors wide-angle lens for creating depth, and by the time he was making Minority Report, he was more confident with elaborate camera movements.

In an interview with The Tech in 2015, Spielberg described how he chooses his film projects:

[Sometimes], a story speaks to me, even if it doesn't speak to any of my collaborators or any of my partners, who look at me and scratch their heads and say, "Gee, are you sure you wanna get into that trench for a year and a half?" I love people challenging me that way because it's a real test about my own convictions and [whether] I can be the standing man of my own life and take a stand on a subject that may not be popular, but that I would be proud to add to the body of my work. That's pretty much the litmus test that gets me to say, "Yeah, I'll direct that one."

Spielberg's films contain many recurrent themes. One of the most pertinent revolves around "ordinary people in extraordinary circumstances". The ordinary people often have limitations, but they succeed in becoming a "hero". A consistent theme in his family-friendly work is a childlike sense of wonder and faith, and "the goodness in humanity will prevail". He has also explored the importance of childhood, loss of innocence and the need for parental figures. In exploring the parent-child relationship, there is usually a flawed or irresponsible father figure. This theme personally resonates with Spielberg's childhood. Exploring extraterrestrial life is another aspect to his work. Spielberg described himself as like an "alien" during childhood, and this interest came from his father, a science fiction fan. He recalls: "My parents split up when I was 15 or 16 years old, and I needed a special friend, and had to use my imagination to take me to places that felt good – that helped me move beyond the problems my parents were having, and that ended our family as a whole. And thinking about that time, I thought, an extraterrestrial character would be the perfect springboard to purge the pain of your parents' splitting up."

=== Collaborators ===
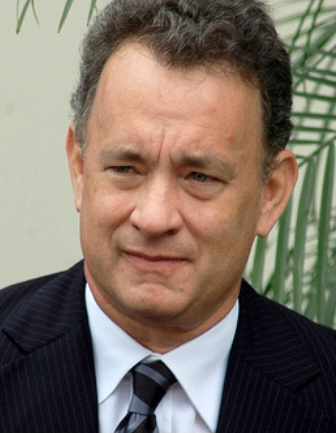
Spielberg has collaborated on numerous projects with Tom Hanks since Saving Private Ryan

Michael Kahn has edited all of Spielberg's films since 1977, with the exception of E.T. (1982) and Disclosure Day (2026). Spielberg has also worked consistently with production designer Rick Carter and writer David Koepp. The producer Kathleen Kennedy is one of Spielberg's longest serving collaborators. Spielberg also displays loyalty to his actors, casting them repeatedly, including Tom Hanks, Harrison Ford, Mark Rylance, Richard Dreyfuss and Tom Cruise. In 2005, Cruise called him "the greatest storyteller cinema's ever known".

Hanks has collaborated with Spielberg on various projects in both film and television, starting with Saving Private Ryan. The pair also executive produced the war miniseries Band of Brothers (2001) and The Pacific (2010), both of which gained them Primetime Emmy Awards.

Janusz Kamiński has served as a cinematographer on dozens of Spielberg's films. Kamiński's first collaboration with Spielberg started with the Holocaust drama Schindler's List for which Kamiński received the Academy Award for Best Cinematography. The film used black-and-white cinematography. As Spielberg's career evolved from action to drama films, he and Kamiński adopted more handheld camerawork, as evidenced in Schindler's List and Amistad. Kamiński would later receive his second Academy Award for cinematography on Saving Private Ryan. The film's opening sequence to re-enact the invasion of Normandy was praised for realism. Kamiński garnered three more Academy Award nominations for his work on War Horse (2011), the historical epic Lincoln (2012), and West Side Story (2021).

Spielberg's long-time partnership with composer John Williams began with The Sugarland Express. Williams would return to compose all but five of Spielberg's feature films (the exceptions are Twilight Zone: The Movie, The Color Purple, Bridge of Spies, Ready Player One and West Side Story). Williams won three of his five Academy Awards for Best Original Score for his work on Spielberg's films: Jaws, E.T. the Extra-Terrestrial and Schindler's List. While making Schindler's List, Spielberg approached Williams about composing the score. After seeing a rough, unedited cut, Williams was impressed, and said that composing would be too challenging. He said to Spielberg, "You need a better composer than I am for this film." Spielberg responded, "I know. But they're all dead!" In 2016, Spielberg presented Williams with the 44th AFI Life Achievement Award, the first to be awarded to a composer.

== Personal life ==
Spielberg met actress Amy Irving in 1976 when she auditioned for Close Encounters of the Third Kind. After meeting her, Spielberg told his co-producer Julia Phillips, "I met a real heartbreaker last night." Although she was too young for the role, she and Spielberg began dating and she eventually moved into what she described as his "bachelor funky" house. They broke up in 1979. In 1984, they renewed their romance and married in November 1985. A son had been born on June 13 of that year. In 1989, the couple divorced; they agreed to live near each other to share custody of the child. Their divorce settlement is one of the most expensive in history.

Spielberg met actress Kate Capshaw when he cast her in Indiana Jones and the Temple of Doom in 1984. They married on October 12, 1991; Capshaw converted to Judaism before their marriage. Spielberg said he rediscovered "the honor of being a Jew" when they married. He said, "Kate is Protestant and she insisted on converting to Judaism. She spent a year studying, did the mikveh, the whole thing. She chose to do a full conversion before we were married in 1991, and she married me after becoming a Jew. I think that, more than anything else, brought me back to Judaism." He credits her for the family's level of observance; "This shiksa goddess has made me a better Jew than my own parents", he said. Capshaw was commissioned by the National Portrait Gallery to paint a portrait of Spielberg. Her 2025 artwork, The Picture Maker, includes the portrait and a video projection displaying excerpts from films shot by Spielberg during his youth.

He has five children with Capshaw: Sasha Rebecca Spielberg (born May 14, 1990), Sawyer Avery Spielberg (born March 10, 1992), and Destry Allyn Spielberg (born December 1, 1996), and two adopted children. He also has a stepdaughter, Jessica Capshaw (born August 9, 1976). He and his family live in Pacific Palisades, California and East Hampton, New York. He is the godfather of Drew Barrymore and Gwyneth Paltrow.

Spielberg was diagnosed with dyslexia at age 60. In 2022, at age 75, Spielberg was diagnosed with COVID-19 but recovered.

In 2013, Spielberg purchased the 282-foot (86 m) mega-yacht The Seven Seas for US$182 million. During his ownership it was also available for charter at US$1.2 million per month, making it one of the most expensive charters on the market at the time. In 2021, the Canadian steel mogul Barry Zekelman bought it for US$150 million and rechristened the ship Man of Steel. Thereafter, Spielberg ordered a new 358-foot (109 m) Seven Seas.

On Desert Island Discs, his luxury item was an H-8 Bolex Camera. His music choices included Bach, the Beatles and Bruce Springsteen. His book choice was John Steinbeck's The Grapes of Wrath.

=== Stalkers ===
In 1997, Jonathan Norman stalked Spielberg and attempted to enter his home while in possession of a "rape kit"; Norman was subsequently jailed for 25 years. Prosecutors described Norman as "sexually obsessed" with the director. Spielberg told the court he feared Norman intended to "rape or maim him". In 2001, Spielberg was stalked by conspiracy theorist and former social worker Diana Napolis. She accused him and actress Jennifer Love Hewitt of installing a mind-control device in her brain and being part of a satanic cult. Napolis was committed to a mental institution, and pled guilty to stalking. She was released on probation with a condition that she have no contact with either Spielberg or Hewitt.

== Political views and activism ==
Spielberg has usually supported Democratic Party candidates. He has donated over $800,000 to the Democratic Party and its nominees. He has been a close friend of former President Bill Clinton and worked with the president for the USA Millennium celebrations. He directed an 18-minute film for the project, scored by John Williams and titled The American Journey. It was shown at America's Millennium Gala on December 31, 1999, in the National Mall at the Lincoln Memorial Reflecting Pool in Washington, D.C. Spielberg endorsed Hillary Clinton, Clinton's wife, in the 2016 presidential election; he donated $1 million to Priorities USA Action.

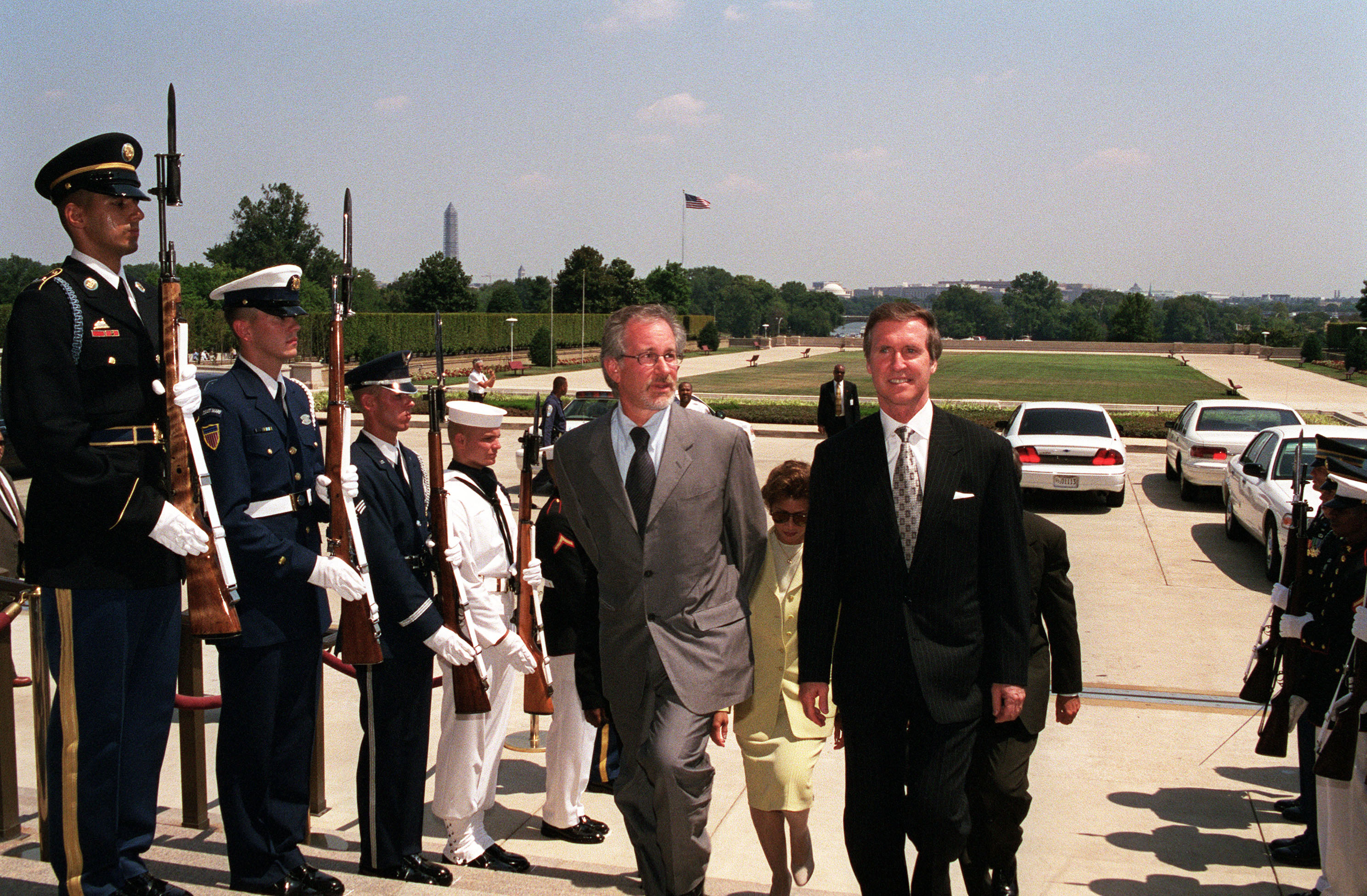
Secretary of Defense William S. Cohen escorts Spielberg through a military honor cordon into the Pentagon in 1999

Spielberg resigned as a member of the national advisory board of the Boy Scouts of America in 2001 because he disagreed with the organization's anti-homosexuality stance. In 2007, the Arab League voted to boycott Spielberg's movies after he donated $1 million for relief efforts in Israel during the 2006 Lebanon War. On February 20, 2007, Spielberg, Jeffrey Katzenberg, and David Geffen invited Democrats to a fundraiser for Barack Obama.

In February 2008, Spielberg resigned as advisor to the 2008 Summer Olympics in response to the Chinese government's inaction over the War in Darfur. Spielberg said in a statement, "I find that my conscience will not allow me to continue business as usual [...] Sudan's government bears the bulk of the responsibility for these on-going crimes, but the international community, and particularly China, should be doing more." The International Olympic Committee (IOC) respected Spielberg's decision but IOC president Jacques Rogge expressed disappointment: "[Spielberg] certainly would have brought a lot to the opening ceremony in terms of creativity." Chinese state media called Spielberg's comments "unfair".

In September 2008, Spielberg and his wife offered their support to same-sex marriage in California by issuing a statement following their donation of $100,000 to the "No on Proposition 8" campaign fund, a figure equal to the amount of money Brad Pitt donated to the same campaign less than a week prior. In 2018, Spielberg and his wife donated $500,000 to the March for Our Lives student demonstration in favor of gun control in the United States.

In December 2023, after the October 7 attacks, the Shoah Foundation, which was founded by Spielberg, said that it had gathered over 100 video testimonies of those who experienced the attacks on that day to add them to the collection of "Holocaust survivor and witness testimony." Speaking of the attacks he said, "I never imagined I would see such unspeakable barbarity against Jews in my lifetime" and that the Shoah Foundation project will ensure "that their stories would be recorded and shared in the effort to preserve history and to work toward a world without Antisemitism or hate of any kind".

== Awards and honors ==
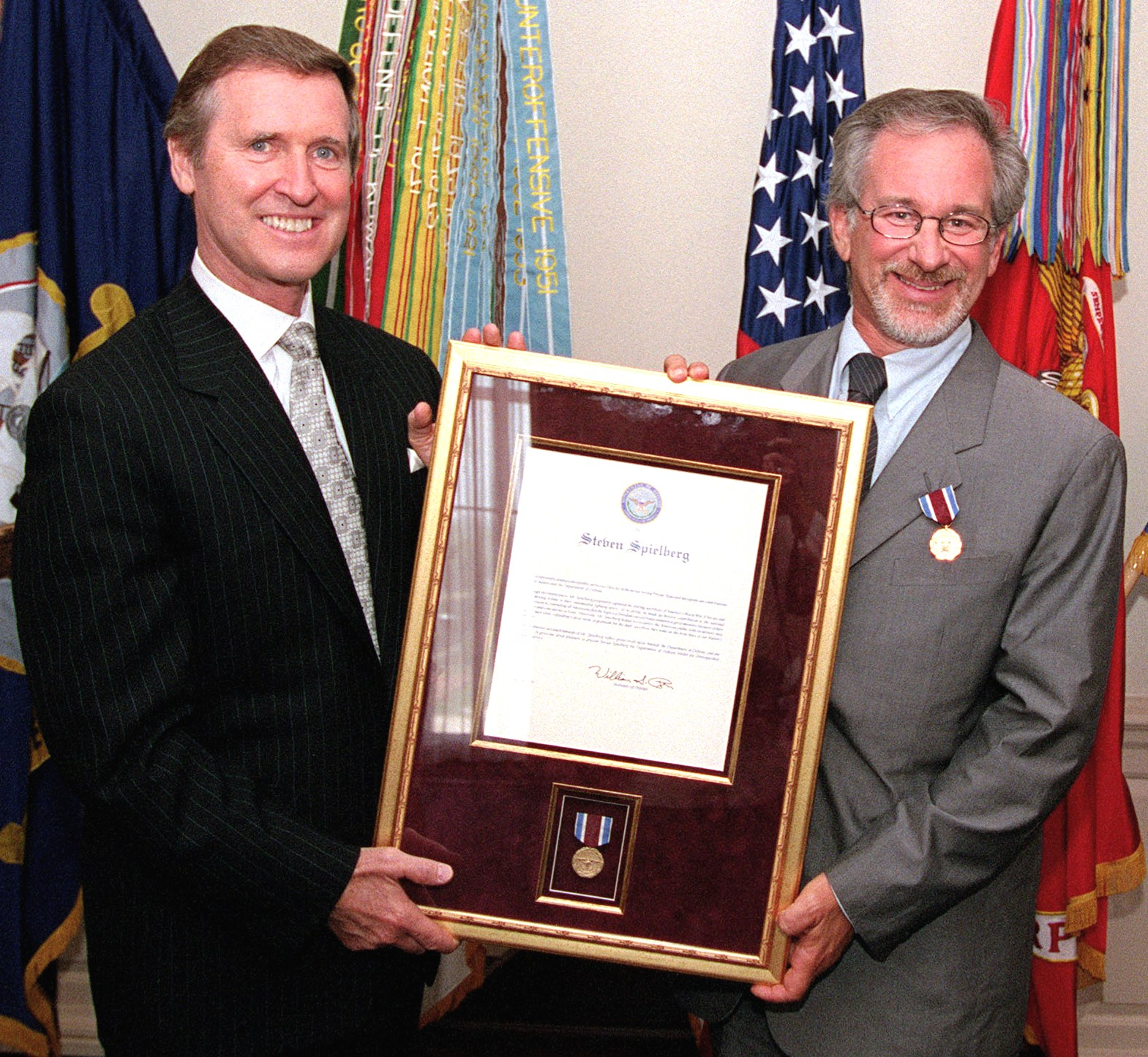
Spielberg receiving a public service award presented by US Secretary of Defense William Cohen, 1999

Jaws, Close Encounters of the Third Kind, E.T, Raiders of the Lost Ark and Schindler's List are included on the AFI's 100 Years...100 Movies.

Spielberg has won three Academy Awards. He received nine nominations for Best Director, and won twice (for Schindler's List and Saving Private Ryan). His third was in Best Picture, for Schindler's List. He is the only director to receive a Best Director nomination from the academy in 6 different decades. In 1987, he was awarded the Irving G. Thalberg Memorial Award for his work as a creative producer. Drawing from his own experiences in Scouting, Spielberg helped the Boy Scouts of America develop a merit badge in cinematography to promote filmmaking as a marketable skill; the badge was launched at the 1989 National Scout Jamboree. In 1989, Spielberg was presented with the Distinguished Eagle Scout Award. Spielberg received the AFI Life Achievement Award in 1995.

In 1998, he was awarded the Order of Merit of the Federal Republic of Germany. The award was presented to him by President Roman Herzog in recognition of Schindler's List and work with the Shoah Foundation. Spielberg was awarded the Medal for Distinguished Public Service in 1999, in recognition for Saving Private Ryan. For the same film, he also received an award for Outstanding Directorial Achievement in Motion Pictures by the Directors Guild of America. The next year, he received the Lifetime Achievement Award from the Directors Guild of America.

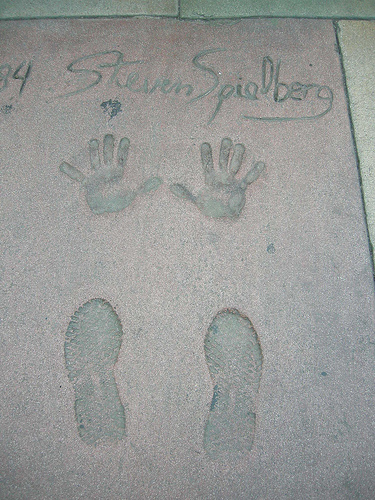
Spielberg's shoeprints and handprints in front of the Grauman's Chinese Theatre

Spielberg was given a star on the Hollywood Walk of Fame in 2003, located on 6801 Hollywood Boulevard. Additionally, he was awarded the Blessed are the Peacemakers Award from the Catholic Theological Union in 2003. On April 15, 2003, Spielberg was awarded Knight Grand Cross of the Order of Merit of the Italian Republic. On July 15, 2006, Spielberg was awarded the Gold Hugo Lifetime Achievement Award at the Summer Gala of the Chicago International Film Festival, and was awarded a Kennedy Center honor on December 3. The tribute to Spielberg featured a biographical short film narrated by Liam Neeson, and a performance of the finale to Leonard Bernstein's Candide, conducted by John Williams.

The Science Fiction Hall of Fame inducted Spielberg in 2005, the first year it considered non-literary contributors. He was a recipient of the Visual Effects Society Lifetime Achievement Award in February 2008; it is awarded for "significant and lasting contributions to the art and science of the visual effects industry". In 2009, Spielberg was awarded the Cecil B. DeMille Award by the Hollywood Foreign Press Association for "outstanding contributions to the world of entertainment".

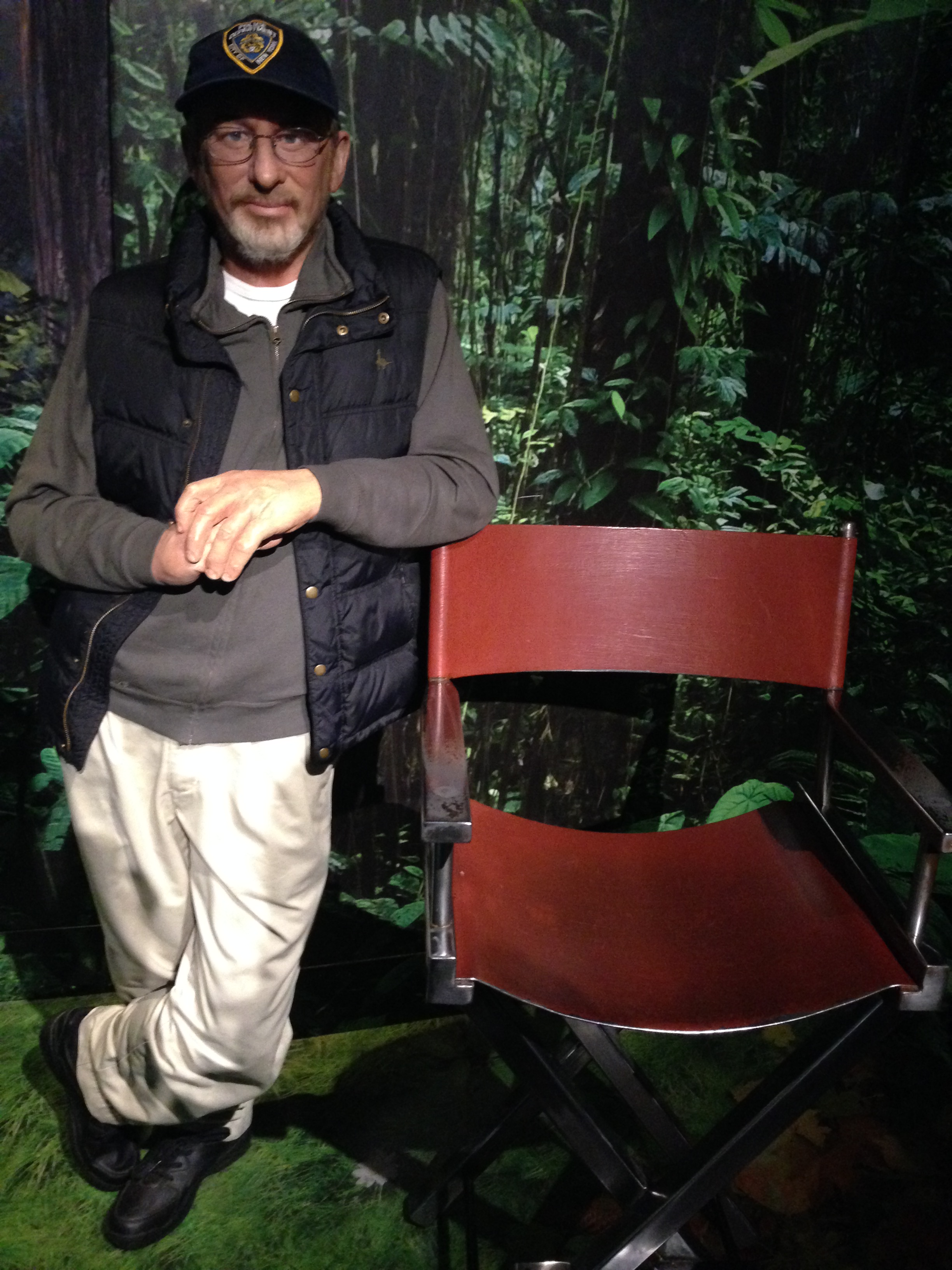
Waxwork of Spielberg at Madame Tussauds, London

In 2001, he was awarded an honorary knighthood (KBE), by Queen Elizabeth II for services to the British film industry. Because he is not a British citizen, he did not kneel to be knighted, nor can he use the honorific prefix "Sir", but he can use the suffix "KBE." Premiere ranked him first place in the list of 100 Most Powerful People in Movies in 2003. In 2004, he was awarded France's highest civil honor, the Legion of Honour by President Jacques Chirac. In June 2008, Spielberg received Arizona State University's Hugh Downs Award for Communication Excellence. In October 2009, Spielberg received the Philadelphia Liberty Medal; the prize was presented by former US President Bill Clinton. In October 2011, he was made a Commander of the Order of the Belgian Crown, one of Belgium's highest honors. On November 19, 2013, Spielberg was honored by the National Archives and Records Administration with a Records of Achievement Award. Spielberg was given two facsimiles of the 13th Amendment; the first which passed in 1861 but was not ratified, and the second signed by Abraham Lincoln in 1865 to abolish slavery. The amendment and the process of passing it were the subject of his film Lincoln. On November 24, 2015, Spielberg was awarded the Presidential Medal of Freedom from President Barack Obama at the White House.

In July 2016, Spielberg was awarded a gold Blue Peter badge by the BBC children's television program Blue Peter. He has honorary degrees from the University of Southern California, 1994; Brown University, 1999; Yale University, 2002; Boston University, 2009; and Harvard University, 2016.

In June 2022, Spielberg won his first Tony Award nomination for co-producing the Broadway production of A Strange Loop, winning Best Musical. He received a further two nominations in the same category for producing Water for Elephants (2024), and Death Becomes Her (2025).

On November 15, 2025, Spielberg was honored with the National Portrait Gallery's Portrait of a Nation Award. The Award recognizes the honoree "for their transformative contributions to American history and culture" and was presented to him by artist Amy Sherald. The National Portrait Gallery commissioned artist Kate Capshaw to paint Spielberg's portrait for inclusion in the Gallery's collection.

In February 2026, Spielberg achieved EGOT status for receiving the Grammy Award for Best Music Film for producing Music by John Williams.

Awards and nominations received by Spielberg's films
Year	Title	Academy Awards		BAFTA Awards		Golden Globe Awards	
Year	Title	Nominations	Wins	Nominations	Wins	Nominations	Wins
1975	Jaws	4	3	7	1	4	1
1977	Close Encounters of the Third Kind	9	2	9	1	4	
1979	1941	3				5	
1981	Raiders of the Lost Ark	9	5	7	1	1	
1982	E.T. the Extra-Terrestrial	9	4	12	1	5	2
1984	Indiana Jones and the Temple of Doom	2	1	4	1		
1985	The Color Purple	11		1		5	1
1987	Empire of the Sun	6		6	3	2	
1989	Indiana Jones and the Last Crusade	3	1	3		1	
1991	Hook	5				1	
1993	Jurassic Park	3	3	3	2		
1993	Schindler's List	12	7	13	7	6	3
1997	The Lost World: Jurassic Park	1					
1997	Amistad	4				4	
1998	Saving Private Ryan	11	5	10	2	5	2
2001	A.I. Artificial Intelligence	2		1		3	
2002	Minority Report	1		1			
2002	Catch Me If You Can	2		4	1	1	
2005	War of the Worlds	3					
2005	Munich	5				2	
2008	Indiana Jones and the Kingdom of the Crystal Skull			1			
2011	The Adventures of Tintin	1		2		1	1
2011	War Horse	6		5		2	
2012	Lincoln	12	2	10	1	7	1
2015	Bridge of Spies	6	1	9	1	1	
2016	The BFG			1			
2017	The Post	2				6	
2018	Ready Player One	1		1			
2021	West Side Story	7	1	5	1	4	3
2022	The Fabelmans	7		1		5	2
Total		147	35	116	22	75	16

Directed Academy Award performances
Under Spielberg's direction, these actors have received Academy Award wins and nominations for their performances in their respective roles.

Year	Performer	Film	Result
Academy Award for Best Actor
1993	Liam Neeson	Schindler's List	Nominated
1998	Tom Hanks	Saving Private Ryan	Nominated
2012	Daniel Day-Lewis	Lincoln	Won
Academy Award for Best Actress
1985	Whoopi Goldberg	The Color Purple	Nominated
2017	Meryl Streep	The Post	Nominated
2022	Michelle Williams	The Fabelmans	Nominated
Academy Award for Best Supporting Actor
1993	Ralph Fiennes	Schindler's List	Nominated
1997	Anthony Hopkins	Amistad	Nominated
2002	Christopher Walken	Catch Me If You Can	Nominated
2012	Tommy Lee Jones	Lincoln	Nominated
2015	Mark Rylance	Bridge of Spies	Won
2022	Judd Hirsch	The Fabelmans	Nominated
Academy Award for Best Supporting Actress
1977	Melinda Dillon	Close Encounters of the Third Kind	Nominated
1985	Margaret Avery	The Color Purple	Nominated
1985	Oprah Winfrey	The Color Purple	Nominated
2012	Sally Field	Lincoln	Nominated
2021	Ariana DeBose	West Side Story	Won

== Legacy ==
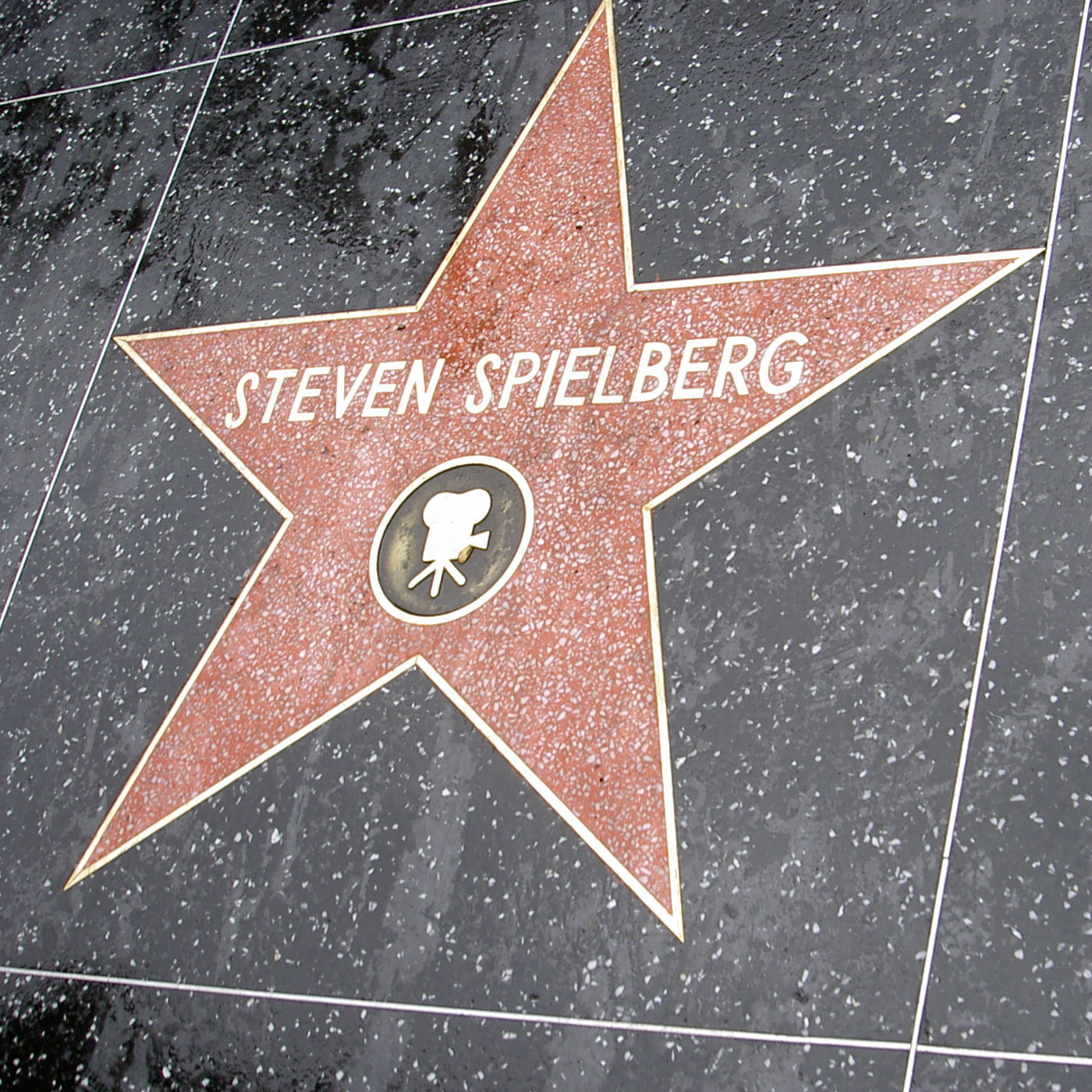
Spielberg's star on the Hollywood Walk of Fame

An important figure of the New Hollywood era, Spielberg is widely regarded as one of the most influential and commercially successful film directors of all time. Some of his films were in the top ten highest-grossing films of the 1970s and 1980s, with Jaws, E.T. the Extra-Terrestrial and Jurassic Park all becoming the highest-grossing film at the time of their respective releases. In 1996, Life magazine named Spielberg the most influential person of his generation. In 2003, Premiere magazine ranked him first place in the list of 100 Most Powerful People in Movies. In 2005, Empire magazine ranked him number one on a list of the greatest film directors of all time. In 2013, Time magazine listed him as one of the 100 most influential people. According to Forbes' magazine of Most Influential Celebrities of 2014, Spielberg was ranked first. As of December 2024, Forbes estimates his net worth at $5.3 billion, making him one of the richest people in the entertainment industry.

His work is admired by numerous acclaimed directors, including Robert Aldrich, Ingmar Bergman, Werner Herzog, Stanley Kubrick, David Lean, George Lucas, Sidney Lumet, Roman Polanski, Martin Scorsese, François Truffaut and Jean Renoir. Spielberg's films have also influenced directors J. J. Abrams, Paul Thomas Anderson, Sean Baker, Brad Bird, Neill Blomkamp, Jon M. Chu, Arnaud Desplechin, Gareth Edwards, Roland Emmerich, Enrique Gato, Don Hertzfeldt, Peter Jackson, Kal Ng, Christopher Nolan, Jordan Peele, S. S. Rajamouli, Matt Reeves, Robert Rodriguez, John Sayles, Ridley Scott, John Singleton, Kevin Smith, Genndy Tartakovsky, Michael Williams, Takashi Yamazaki, and Gints Zilbalodis. In 2004, film critic Tom Shone said of Spielberg, "If you have to point to any one director of the last twenty-five years [1979–2004] in whose work the medium of film was most fully itself–where we found out what it does best when left to its own devices, it has to be that guy." Jess Cagle, former editor of Entertainment Weekly, called Spielberg "arguably (well, who would argue?) the greatest filmmaker in history." Stephen Rowley, writing for Senses of Cinema, discussed Spielberg's strengths as a filmmaker, saying "there is a welcome complexity of tone and approach in these later films that defies the lazy stereotypes often bandied about his films", and that "Spielberg continues to take risks, with his body of work continuing to grow more impressive and ambitious", concluding that he has only received "limited, begrudging recognition" from critics. In a 1999 "Millennium Movies" survey of British film fans run by the Sky Premier channel, Spielberg had seven films in the top 100, which made him the most popular director.

Critics have argued that Spielberg's films are commonly sentimental and moralistic. In the book Easy Riders, Raging Bulls, Peter Biskind wrote that Spielberg is "infantilizing the audience, reconstituting the spectator as child, then overwhelming him and her with sound and spectacle, obliterating irony, aesthetic self-consciousness, and critical reflection". Critic Ray Carney and actor Crispin Glover opined that Spielberg's works are not risky and lack depth. Filmmaker Jean-Luc Godard opined that Spielberg was partly responsible for the lack of artistic merit in mainstream cinema, and accused Spielberg of using Schindler's List to profit from a tragedy, despite that Spielberg chose not to take a salary for the film. In defense of Spielberg, critic Roger Ebert said "Has Godard or any other director living or dead done more than Spielberg, with his Holocaust Project, to honor and preserve the memories of the survivors?"

Seven of his films have been inducted into the National Film Registry by the Library of Congress as being "culturally, historically, or aesthetically significant": Jaws, Close Encounters of the Third Kind, Raiders of the Lost Ark, E.T., Jurassic Park, Schindler's List, and Saving Private Ryan.

== Filmography ==
Prolific in film since the 1960s, Spielberg has directed 36 feature films, and co-produced many works.

Directed features
Year	Title	Distributor
1964	Firelight	Phoenix Little Theatre
1971	Duel	Universal Pictures
1974	The Sugarland Express	Universal Pictures
1975	Jaws	Universal Pictures
1977	Close Encounters of the Third Kind	Columbia Pictures
1979	1941	Universal Pictures
1981	Raiders of the Lost Ark	Paramount Pictures
1982	E.T. the Extra-Terrestrial	Universal Pictures
1984	Indiana Jones and the Temple of Doom	Paramount Pictures
1985	The Color Purple	Warner Bros.
1987	Empire of the Sun	Warner Bros.
1989	Indiana Jones and the Last Crusade	Paramount Pictures
1989	Always	Universal Pictures
1991	Hook	TriStar Pictures
1993	Jurassic Park	Universal Pictures
1993	Schindler's List	Universal Pictures
1997	The Lost World: Jurassic Park	Universal Pictures
1997	Amistad	DreamWorks Pictures
1998	Saving Private Ryan	DreamWorks Pictures / Paramount Pictures
2001	A.I. Artificial Intelligence	Warner Bros. Pictures / DreamWorks Pictures
2002	Minority Report	20th Century Fox / DreamWorks Pictures
2002	Catch Me If You Can	DreamWorks Pictures
2004	The Terminal	DreamWorks Pictures
2005	War of the Worlds	Paramount Pictures / DreamWorks Pictures
2005	Munich	Universal Pictures / DreamWorks Pictures
2008	Indiana Jones and the Kingdom of the Crystal Skull	Paramount Pictures
2011	The Adventures of Tintin	Paramount Pictures / Sony Pictures Releasing
2011	War Horse	Walt Disney Studios Motion Pictures
2012	Lincoln	Walt Disney Studios Motion Pictures / 20th Century Fox
2015	Bridge of Spies	Walt Disney Studios Motion Pictures / 20th Century Fox
2016	The BFG	Walt Disney Studios Motion Pictures
2017	The Post	20th Century Fox
2018	Ready Player One	Warner Bros. Pictures
2021	West Side Story	20th Century Studios
2022	The Fabelmans	Universal Pictures
2026	Disclosure Day	Universal Pictures

== See also ==
- Directors with two films rated "A+" by CinemaScore
- List of oldest and youngest Academy Award winners and nominees — Youngest nominees for Best Director
- Steven Spielberg's unrealized projects
