= Firelight (1964 film) =

Sci-fi adventure film by Steven Spielberg

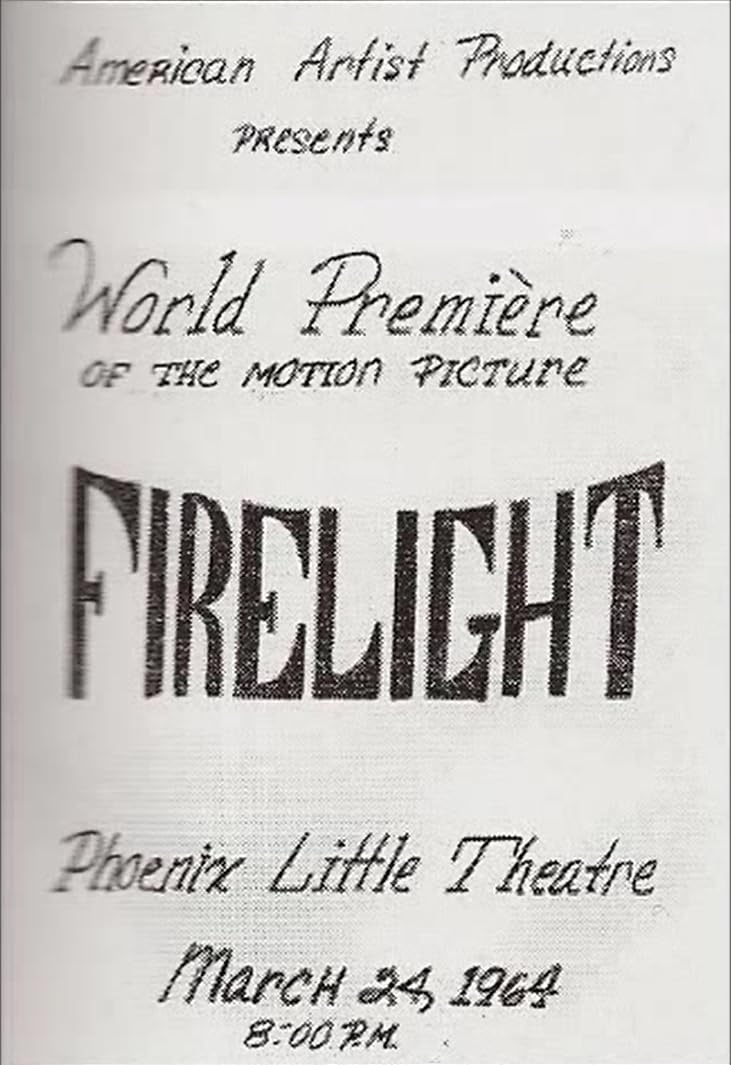
- Newspaper advertisement
- Directed by: Steven Spielberg
- Written by: Steven Spielberg
- Produced by: Arnold Spielberg; Leah Spielberg
- Starring: Clark Lohr; Carolyn Owen
- Cinematography: Steven Spielberg
- Edited by: Steven Spielberg (uncredited)
- Music by: Steven Spielberg (composer); Arcadia High School Band (performer)
- Production company: American Artist Productions
- Distributed by: Phoenix Little Theatre
- Release date: March 24, 1964
- Running time: 135 minutes
- Country: United States
- Budget: $500
- Box office: $501

Firelight is a 1964 science fiction film written and directed by American filmmaker Steven Spielberg at the age of 17. This is Spielberg's feature film directorial debut.

The film follows a mysterious alien encounter and invasion; Spielberg would return to the subject with Firelight as inspiration for his third major film, Close Encounters of the Third Kind in 1977. Only three minutes and forty seconds of footage from Firelight has been made public, and very little of it survives. Spielberg has called it "one of the five worst films ever made."

== Plot ==
Firelight follows a group of scientists—particularly Tony Karcher and UFO believer Howard Richards—as they investigate a series of colored lights in the sky and the subsequent disappearance of people, animals and objects from the fictional American town of Freeport, Arizona. Among those abducted are a dog, a unit of soldiers and a young girl named Lisa, whose abduction induces a heart attack in her mother. The film has sub-plots involving marital discord between Karcher and his wife Debbie, and the obsessive quest of Richards to convince the CIA that alien life exists. The twist comes as the aliens, represented by three shadows, reveal their purpose: to transport Freeport to their home planet Altaris to create a human zoo.

== Cast ==
Many of the cast for Firelight were from the Arcadia High School productions of Guys and Dolls and I Remember Mama. Spielberg's sister had a leading role.

- Clark Lohr as Howard Richards
- Carolyn Owen as Lisa's Mother
- Robert Robyn as Tony Karcher
- Nancy Spielberg as Lisa
- Beth Weber as Debbie
- Margaret Peyou as Helen Richards
- Warner Marshall as Soldier
- Dede Pisani as Lover
- Tina Lanser as Maid
- Chuck Case as Teenage Boy

== Production and music ==
Spielberg composed the music for Firelight, his first original score, on his clarinet. Spielberg's mother, a former pianist, transposed the score to piano and then to sheet music. The Arcadia High School band then performed the score for the film.

The film was shot on weekends and evenings. Many scenes were shot at the Spielberg home and near the garage. Outside shots were filmed in scrub land near Spielberg's home and school.

== Release and analysis ==
Firelight was premiered on March 24, 1964, at Spielberg's local cinema, the Phoenix Little Theatre, in Phoenix, Arizona. Spielberg's father had hired the venue for the evening for $400. Spielberg managed to sell (through the use of advertising by friends and family) 500 tickets at one dollar each. "I counted the receipts that night", Spielberg recalled, "And we charged a dollar a ticket. Five hundred people came to the movie and I think somebody probably paid two dollars, because we made one dollar profit that night, and that was it." (Note: The profit of $1 would be equivalent to around $10 in 2024 when adjusted for inflation.)

Excerpts of Firelight show a distinct Spielberg visual style and his use of tracking shots. Firelight came to form a basis of Spielberg's later hit movie Close Encounters of the Third Kind.
