= Phoenix Theatre (Phoenix) =

Theatre company in Phoenix, Arizona

The Phoenix Theatre Company
- Interactive map of The Phoenix Theatre Company
- Former names: Phoenix Little Theater (1954-1985)
- Address: 1825 N Central Avenue; Phoenix, Arizona; United States
- Location: Phoenix, 85004
- Coordinates: 33.4671593°N 112.0745369°W
- Owner: Phoenix Theater Company

Construction
- Opened: 1920

Website
- phoenixtheatre.com

The Phoenix Theatre Company is a professional theatre company located in Phoenix, Arizona. Started in 1920 by a theatre troupe known as the Phoenix Players, the theatre is among the oldest continually operating theaters west of the Mississippi River. The theatre is a non-profit corporation and encompasses the Hormel Theatre, Judith Hardes Theatre, and the new Dr. Stacie J. and Richard J Stephenson Theatre, as well as Partners That Heal and numerous community-focused programs. They also host The Richard P. Stahl Festival Of New American Theatre annually to promote new works in Arizona.

== History ==
The Phoenix Little Theatre was founded by Harry Behn and Maie Bartlett Heard (who also founded the Heard Museum) as the Phoenix Players in 1920—joining into the Little Theatre Movement of that time. Four years later, it moved into the Heard family's coach house at Central and McDowell Roads. In 1928, the theatre applied for its articles of incorporation and by its eighth season boasted 424 members. By 1940, the theatre had close to 1,000 members and remained operational throughout World War II. The theatre moved into its current home, within a municipal cultural complex that included the Phoenix Art Museum and the Phoenix Public Library, in 1951. In 1954, the theatre began its Children's Theatre. In 1985, the "Little" was dropped from the name, leaving it simply the "Phoenix Theatre." In 2019, the organization was renamed officially as The Phoenix Theatre Company.
