= The Work and the Glory (film series) =

American film series

- Official film series logo
- Based on: The Work and the Glory series by Gerald N. Lund
- Distributed by: Excel Entertainment Group
- Release dates: November 24, 2004 (Pillar of Light); October 19, 2005 (American Zion); November 22, 2006 (A House Divided)
- Country: United States
- Language: English
- Budget: $20,500,000 (3 films)
- Box office: $6,697,771 (3 films)

The Work and the Glory film series consists of American period piece-historical fiction Christian-drama films, based on novels of the same name written by Gerald N. Lund. The plot centers around the fictional family named the Steeds, their experiences as early members of The Church of Jesus Christ of Latter-day Saints and their pioneering experiences with Joseph Smith.

The films were well received from critics within the religious target audience, while it received a more critical response from the wider array of critics. Though the movies were not financially successful in theaters, multi-millionaire Larry H. Miller continued with assisted funding to complete a trilogy of movies. The collection was later stated to have turned a profit, through their combined home video sales.

== Development ==
The series of historical-fiction novels titled The Work and the Glory and written by Gerald N. Lund, were published between 1990 and 1998. The concept for the series of books was conceptualized by Kenneth "Kim" Moe, prior to the hiring of Lund as author.

Moe was determined years earlier that a series of novels based around the early history of The Church of Jesus Christ of Latter-day Saints was something that he was inspired by God to ensure is written. His fascination with the early members of the Church and the events of the pioneers, first began after reading a short history about the Latter-day Saints while in a Salt Lake City International Airport; and event which eventually led to his baptism as a member of its congregation. After various failed attempts at writing a draft for the novel, Moe realized that he was not the man for the job. He went to a local bookstore and purchased various Latter-day Saint fiction until he read Lund's The Alliance and The Freedom Factor; where he was certain he'd found the writer. During the 1980s while working as a seminary teacher, Lund was approached with the offer from his boss, who told him that a Ricks College donor (Moe) had wanted him to write a novel adaptation of the early history of Latter-day Saints. At that point the author turned down the opportunity, believing that he would not have the time to do so. Dismayed at Lund's declined offer, Moe continued to attempt writing the first draft while he continued to have the author's boss repeatedly pitch the idea to Lund. Eventually, Gerald N. Lund decided to write the novels after fasting and praying about the project. The author's work continued through his time serving as a Bishop of his local ward, a Stake President of his stake, and as a Seventy in the Second Quorum of the Seventy.

Following the release of the novels, Lund approached the idea for a feature film adaptation and attempted forming a media company to produce the movies. Unsuccessful in his attempts, the author determined to hire a professional filmmaker. Serving as a general authority, Lund went to the First Presidency for their approval in creating a film that was not officially produced as media from the Church. Approached by many filmmakers, Lund personally selected Scott Swofford as director. Though production concerns arose, including Lund's hope that the epic scope of his novels would translate adequately to film, the movie series was deemed a success. Surpassing the author's expectation in earning over $6 million at the box office, they have since been revealed to have also turned a profit when including home video sales.

== Films ==
Film	U.S. release date	Director	Screenwriter	Producer
The Work and the Glory: Pillar of Light	November 24, 2004	Russ Holt	Russ Holt	Scott H. Swofford
The Work and the Glory: American Zion	October 19, 2005	Sterling Van Wagenen	Matt Whitaker	Scott H. Swofford
The Work and the Glory III: A House Divided	November 22, 2006	Sterling Van Wagenen	Matt Whitaker	Scott H. Swofford

=== The Work and the Glory: Pillar of Light (2004) ===
In spring of the early 1820s, after selling their Vermont homestead the Benjamin Steed family, including: Benjamin, his wife Mary Anne, their children Joshua, Nathan, Melissa, Rebecca, and Matthew; moves to upstate New York, where they begin to establish themselves within the community of Palmyra. As they begin to successfully clear the land for their farm with the help of hired men, local brothers named Hyrum Smith and Joseph Smith Jr., the family finds themselves at the center of controversy. Though they had peacefully integrated socially amongst their neighbors, the family is surprised by the disruption they encounter due to their friendship with the Smiths; in part due to their bold claims: that God once again speaks to a living prophet on the Earth, that Joseph had been divinely chosen to be that role, and that through the deity's instructions Joseph is translating ancient scriptures of the Ancient Americas that further confirm the teachings of The Holy Bible and that Jesus Christ is the Savior of the world, and that through various works reestablish the Church that Christ had in ancient times. (Note: See beliefs of The Church of Jesus Christ of Latter-day Saints, for more details.)

When the Steeds find that their family is divided on these topics, a number of them discover for themselves that what Joseph Smith teaches is true and decide to join the ranks of the newly reestablished church; at the dismay of the patriarch Benjamin. The family's oldest son joins the ranks of the mobs who tyrannize the community, and despite his differences with the Latter-day Saints, Ben finds himself defending their personal choices. As the family has disputations amongst them as to the validity of the experiences of their friends, angry members of the community begin to persecute them. Together they work towards a familial decision to trust and help the Smiths, or to turn against them.

=== The Work and the Glory: American Zion (2005) ===
During November 1833, Missouri allows hundreds of peaceful inhabitants who are Latter-day Saints to be hunted and driven from their homes in Jackson County. Despite the continued persecution of angry mobs, Joseph Smith led the church members to Far West where he continued to courageously teach the members of the sect of the teachings and understanding that continues from revelations that are made known by God. As they continue the work that they believe they are divinely called to do, they begin to realize that the freedoms they hold as citizens of the United States are being taken from them and under the direction of their religious leaders, prepare to move until they find their promise Zion.

While the events unfold, the Steeds struggle to keep their family together as the strong beliefs in their convictions have led to familial separation due to their differences in religious ideology. After Matthew is taken and beaten for his role as a Latter-day Saint, its discovered that Joshua is continually involved in the violent and murderous attacks against the local Latter-day Saints. Benjamin rises up to stand against the ongoing assaults. Though he doesn't believe their teachings, Ben is determined to protect his family, his friends the Smiths, and the innocent people who are being harmed; even if it means he must stop his oldest son in any way possible.

=== The Work and the Glory III: A House Divided (2006) ===
Years later, after spending time away from his family Joshua Steed finds that his time in Savanna has changed who he once was. No longer a rebellious alcoholic engaged with organized terrorism towards a religious sect of his community, Josh is now a successful and established businessman. Upon marrying a local widow, he discovers that she and her son have joined the Latter-day Saints as members of their church. He finds that he no longer has hate for these people nor their teachings. When his wife Caroline and step-son Will ask about his family, Joshua finds himself ashamed of the events that led to him abandoning his past; including leading the persecution that physically harmed his younger brother Nathan and the other members of his immediate family. Despite his internal humiliation, he determines to return with them to his parents, siblings, and their families.

Returning to Missouri now as a wealthy man, he humbly begins to search for his family. Through his efforts and determination to amend for his past mistakes, the divided Steed house begins to heal. As the Latter-day Saints continue their journey to Missouri, Governor Boggs makes it lawful to kill a member of the church with his Mormon Extermination Order. Joshua soon finds that he and his family are a part of the settlement that will be harmed in these attacks, and realizing that these events are not dissimilar to what he had committed himself to a younger age, he quickly discovers that it is only he who can save them from the gathering mob. Joshua turns to God for guidance and for strength, while racing against time to mend the broken bonds of his childhood home and to fight against the arriving militant dangers.

== Main cast and characters ==
List indicators

This section includes characters who will appear or have appeared in the franchise in main roles.

- An empty grey cell indicates the character was not in the film, or that the character's official presence has not yet been confirmed.
- ^{V} indicates a voice-only role.
- ^{Y} indicates a younger version of the character.

Character
Character	The Work and the Glory: Pillar of Light	The Work and the Glory: American Zion	The Work and the Glory III: A House Divided
Benjamin "Ben" Steed	Sam Hennings	Sam Hennings	Sam Hennings
Mary Anne Steed	Brenda Strong	Brenda Strong	Brenda Strong
Joshua "Josh" Steed	Eric Johnson	Eric Johnson	Eric Johnson
Nathan Steed	Alexander Carroll	Alexander Carroll	Alexander Carroll
Lydia McBride-Steed	Tiffany Dupont	Sera Bastian	Sera Bastian
Melissa Steed	Brighton Hertford	Brighton Hertford	Brighton Hertford
Rebecca "Becca" Steed	Kimberly Varadi	Kimberly Varadi	Julia Cunningham
Matthew Steed	Colin Ford	Colin Ford	Cody Sanders
Jessica Roundy-Steed Griffith	Emily Podleski	Emily Podleski	Emily Podleski
Caroline Mendenhall-Steed			Meredith Salenger
William "Will" Mendenhall Steed			Connor Chavarria
Joseph Smith, Jr.	Jonathan Scarfe	Jonathan Scarfe	Jonathan Scarfe
Emma Smith	Sarah Darling	Melanie Hawkins	Melanie Hawkins

== Additional crew and production details ==
Film	Crew/Detail					
Film	Composer	Cinematographer	Editor	Production companies	Distributing company	Running time
The Work and the Glory: Pillar of Light	Sam Cardon	T.C. Christensen	Stephen L. Johnson	Excel Entertainment, Manchester Pictures	Excel Entertainment Group	1 hr 50 mins
The Work and the Glory: American Zion	Sam Cardon	Reed Smoot	Stephen L. Johnson	Vineyard Productions L.L.C.	Excel Entertainment Group	1 hr 40 mins
The Work and the Glory III: A House Divided	Sam Cardon	Gordon Lonsdale	Stephen L. Johnson	Vineyard Productions L.L.C., Excel Entertainment	Excel Entertainment Group	1 hr 29 mins

== Reception ==
=== Box office and financial performance ===
Following the theatrical release of the first film, financer Larry H. Miller stated that though there were profitability concerns following the release of the first installment due to the status of the projects as some of the most expensive Latter-day Saint media ever made, he felt "comfortable with the level of [its success]." As a result of the box office returns from the first movie, the sequels which were produced back-to-back had a combined budget to equal approximately the cost of their predecessor's.

Film	Box office gross			Box office ranking		Home video total	Budget	Net loss	Ref(s)
Film	North America	Other territories	Worldwide	All time North America	All time worldwide	Home video total	Budget	Net loss	Ref(s)
The Work and the Glory: Pillar of Light	$3,347,647	—N/a	$3,347,647	#6,867	#10,383	information not publicly available	$7,500,000	≥ -$4,152,353	
The Work and the Glory: American Zion	$2,025,032	—N/a	$2,025,032	#7,561	#11,830	information not publicly available	$6,500,000	≥ -$4,474,968	
The Work and the Glory III: A House Divided	$1,325,092	—N/a	$1,325,092	#8,089	#13,106	information not publicly available	$6,500,000	≥ -$5,174,908	
Totals	$6,697,771	N/A	$6,697,771	x̄ #7,506	x̄ #11,773	information not publicly available	$20,500,000	≥ -$13,802,229	

=== Critical and public response ===
Film	Critical response
Film	Rotten Tomatoes
The Work and the Glory: Pillar of Light	17% (12 reviews)
The Work and the Glory: American Zion	45% (11 reviews)
The Work and the Glory III: A House Divided	80% (5 reviews)
