= Seasons of the Heart =

Seasons of the Heart may refer to:

- Seasons of the Heart (1993 film), a evangelistic film starring Leigh Lombardi and Sam Hennings
- Seasons of the Heart (1994 film), a television movie starring George Segal and Carol Burnett
- Seasons of the Heart (album), a 1982 John Denver album, or the title song
