= Christa B. Allen =

American actress (born 1991)

- Born: Christa Brittany Allen; November 11, 1991 (age 34); Wildomar, California, U.S.
- Occupation: Actress
- Years active: 2004–present

Christa Brittany Allen (born November 11, 1991) is an American actress. She is known for playing the younger version of Jennifer Garner's character in both 13 Going on 30 (2004) and Ghosts of Girlfriends Past (2009). In 2006, she starred as the titular character in the CBS children's television series Cake. She played socialite Charlotte Grayson on the ABC drama television series Revenge from 2011 to 2015.

== Early and personal life ==
Allen was born in Wildomar, California. She is the youngest of nine siblings, with eight older brothers. She once spent a summer in a circus.

In August 2025, Allen posted on TikTok that she had escaped a relationship with a wealthy cult leader.

== Career ==
Allen made a brief appearance on The Man Show, and appeared in several student films and commercials. She played the younger version of Jennifer Garner's character in the comedy film, 13 Going on 30 (2004), when she was 11 years old. She again played Garner's younger version in Ghosts of Girlfriends Past (2009). She also had roles in numerous films, including A Merry Little Christmas (2006), Youth in Revolt (2009), One Wish (2010), One Kine Day (2011) and Detention of the Dead (2012). Allen starred as the titular character in the CBS children's television series Cake in 2006.

In 2011, Allen landed one of the main roles as socialite Charlotte Grayson in ABC's drama series Revenge. Allen's last credited appearance as a series regular was the sixth episode of the fourth season, but later returned for the series finale as a guest star. She had guest roles in television shows such as Medium, Cory in the House, The Suite Life on Deck, Grey's Anatomy, ER, CSI: Crime Scene Investigation, Wizards of Waverly Place and Cold Case. In 2015, she had a recurring role as Robyn on the ABC Family sitcom Baby Daddy. In May 2021, she wrote an essay about turning 30 years old for Yahoo!'s website.

Allen is part of a musical act called Pour Vous, which means “for you” in French, with Johnny What. In April 2018, the duo's first single called "Scorpio" was released.

== Filmography ==
Film roles
Year	Title	Role	Notes
2004	13 Going on 30	Young Jenna Rink	
2006	A Merry Little Christmas	Holly	
2009	Ghosts of Girlfriends Past	Teenage Jenny	
2009	Jonas Brothers: The 3D Concert Experience	Featured Fan	
2009	Youth in Revolt	Karen	
2010	One Wish	Molly Wylie	
2011	One Kine Day	Alea	
2012	Detention of the Dead	Janet	
2017	The Valley	Alicia	
2017	One of Us	Melanie/Mary	

Television roles
Year	Title	Role	Notes
2006	Medium	Maura Walker	Episode: "Blood Relation"
2006	Cake	Cake	Lead role
2007	Cory in the House	Cheyenne	Episode: "The Kung Fu Kats Kid"
2008	The Suite Life on Deck	Violet Berg	Episode: "The Kidney of the Sea"
2008	Grey's Anatomy	Holly Anderson	Episode: "All by Myself"
2009	ER	Jody Nugent	Episode: "Love Is a Battlefield"
2009	CSI: Crime Scene Investigation	Matty Moore	Episode: "Miscarriage of Justice"
2009	Chasing a Dream	Nikol Schrunk	Television film
2009	Wizards of Waverly Place	Daphne	Episode: "Family Game Night"
2010	Cold Case	Annabelle Bennet	Episode: "Free Love"
2011	Deadly Sibling Rivalry	Fiona	Television film
2011–2015	Revenge	Charlotte Grayson	Main role (seasons 1–4)
2015	Baby Daddy	Robyn	Recurring role, 4 episodes
2016	Hopeless, Romantic	Liz	Television film
2017	Family of Lies	Emily	Television film
2018	Dangerous Seduction	Posy Pinkerton	Television film; also known as The Queen of Sin
2018	Code Black	Amber	Episode: "Only Human"
2019	When Vows Break	Ella	Television film
2019	Pregnant and Deadly	Amber	Television film
2019	Grand Hotel	Javi's 2nd Girl	Episode: Pilot
2021	Christmas for Keeps	Avery	Television film
