= Richard Gunn (actor) =

American actor (born 1975)

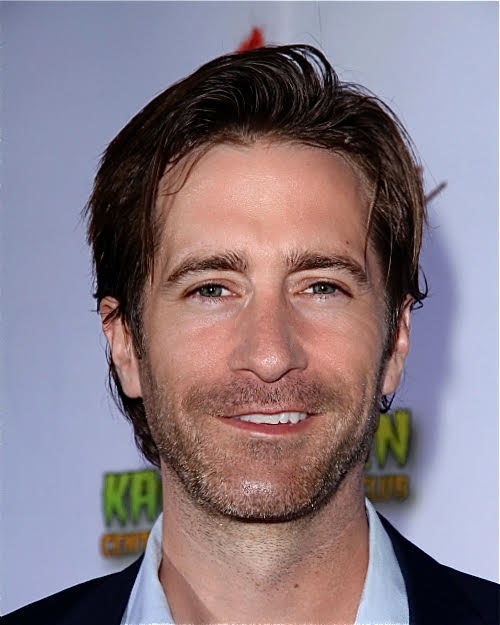
- Gunn at the Viscera Film Festival on July 12, 2012
- Born: May 23, 1975 (age 51); Thousand Oaks, California, United States
- Other name: Richard Neal
- Occupation: Actor
- Years active: 1998–present
- Notable work: Dark Angel; Granite Flats; Hemlock Grove

Richard Gunn (born May 23, 1975) is an American actor. He is best known for portraying Calvin "Sketchy" Theodore in the Fox series Dark Angel (2000–2002), Chief of Police John Sanders in the BYU TV series Granite Flats, and Aitor Quantic in the third and final season of the Netflix original series Hemlock Grove.

== Early life ==
Richard Gunn (sometimes credited as Richard Neal) was born in Thousand Oaks, California, and is the stepson of composer Earle Hagen who composed The Andy Griffith Show theme along with the themes for I Spy and Mod Squad, among others. He was raised in Thousand Oaks and Palm Desert, California with his two sisters. He attended UC Santa Cruz and graduated with honors.

== Career ==
Gunn spent his first summer out of university performing in Shakespeare's Richard III and As You Like It with the professional repertory theater company Shakespeare Santa Cruz. His first television success came as the series regular role of Calvin "Sketchy" Theodore in the television series Dark Angel, which ran for two seasons on Fox. Dark Angel also won a People's Choice Award for Favorite Television New Dramatic Series. In 2013, Gunn was cast as Chief of Police John Sanders, in the BYUtv series Granite Flats. The show ran three seasons until 2015 and co starred Parker Posey and Christopher Lloyd and became available on Netflix in May 2015. Gunn was then cast as Aitor Quantic in the third and final season of the Netflix original Hemlock Grove, which premièred October 23, 2015. Gunn has appeared in numerous films and television episodes, and starred opposite James Caan and Paul Sorvino in the critically acclaimed Lionsgate release For the Love of Money. Gunn is also featured along with Charlize Theron in the thriller, Dark Places, which is based on the novel by Gillian Flynn.

== Personal life ==
From 2008 to 2011, Gunn took a break from the entertainment industry to live on a ranch near Sequoia Park with his then fiancé, writer and producer Jenna Mattison. Mattison and Gunn married in 2013 but have since divorced in 2023.

== Filmography ==
=== Film ===
Year	Title	Role
1998	The Fire Inside	Jack
1999	James	James
2000	Unspeakable	Jixer
2005	Reunion	John Roberts
2005	Yes, And...	Boy
2005	The Third Wish	Heckler
2006	House of the Rising Sun	Jake Trilleau
2006	The Astronaut Farmer	Square Dance Caller
2008	Garden Party	Todd
2009	World Full of Nothing	Rupert Michaels
2010	Framily	Ethan
2011	Fugue	Howard James
2012	For the Love of Money	Vince
2013	Treachery	Robert
2014	Hidden in the Woods	Officer Hooper
2015	Sympathy Said the Shark	Slate
2015	Dark Places	Lou Cates
2015	Gridlocked	Maddox
2017	The Sound	Ethan
2019	Clemency	Deputy Warden Thomas Morgan
2020	Killer Weekend	Detective Bryce
2023	Supercell	Bill Brody

=== Television ===
Year	Title	Role	Notes
2001	Lost Voyage	Randall Banks	TV movie
2001–2002	Dark Angel	Sketchy (AKA Calvin Simon Theodore)	42 episodes
2003	The Partners	Lt. Jones	TV Pilot
2006	Dexter	Sean	Episode 1.2 "Crocodile"
2010	CSI: Crime Scene Investigation	Cody Trimble	Episode 11.8 "Fracked"
2011	The Mentalist	Barlow Flemming	Episode 3.12 "Bloodhounds"
2013–2015	Granite Flats	Chief of Police John Sanders	24 episodes
2015	Hemlock Grove	Aitor Quantic	8 episodes
2019	American Horror Story: 1984	Chief Deputy	Episode: "Red Dawn"
