= American Ride =

American Ride may refer to:

- American Ride (Toby Keith album), Toby Keith's thirteenth studio album, released in 2009
  - "American Ride" (song), the second single and title track from the album
- American Ride (TV series), a BYUtv history program presented by a Harley Davidson-riding host
- American Ride (Willie Nile album), a 2013 album by Willie Nile
