= The Work and the Glory =

- Official theatrical poster
- Directed by: Russell Holt
- Written by: Gerald N. Lund; Russell Holt
- Produced by: Jeff T. Miller; Larry H. Miller; Scott Swofford
- Starring: Sam Hennings; Brenda Strong; Eric Johnson; Alexander Carroll; Tiffany Dupont; Jonathan Scarfe
- Cinematography: T. C. Christensen
- Music by: Sam Cardon
- Distributed by: Excel Entertainment Group
- Release date: 2004
- Country: United States
- Language: English
- Budget: $7,500,000
- Box office: $3,347,647

The Work and the Glory (also known as The Work and the Glory: Pillar of Light) is a 2004 historical fiction drama film directed by Russell Holt, from a script co-written by Gerald N. Lund and Russell Holt. Based on Lund's novel titled The Work and the Glory: Pillar of Light, the movie stars Sam Hennings, Brenda Strong, Eric Johnson, Alexander Carroll, Tiffany Dupont, and Jonathan Scarfe. It tells the story of the fictional Steed family in the 1820s and their struggles trying to adopt the new Mormon religion, and it explores their relationship with their community, with its founder, Joseph Smith and the rest of the Smith family.

The movie successfully launched the titular film series, which consisted of a trilogy.

== Reception ==
On Rotten Tomatoes the film has an approval rating of 17% based on reviews from 12 critics and an audience approval rating of 84% (5000+ ratings).

== Sequels ==
The film was followed by two sequels, The Work and the Glory: American Zion released in 2005, and The Work and the Glory III: A House Divided released in 2006.
