= For the Love of Money (2012 film) =

- DVD cover
- Directed by: Ellie Kanner-Zuckerman
- Screenplay by: Jenna Mattison
- Story by: Michael Micco
- Produced by: Izek Shomof; Jenna Mattison
- Starring: Yehuda Levi; Edward Furlong; James Caan; Jeffrey Tambor; Jonathan Lipnicki
- Cinematography: Andrzej Sekuła
- Edited by: Karl T. Hirsch; Eric Strand
- Music by: Jerome Dillon
- Production company: All Cash Productions
- Release date: 2012
- Running time: 93 minutes
- Country: United States
- Language: English/Hebrew

For the Love of Money is a 2012 action crime drama film directed by Ellie Kanner-Zuckerman, featuring Yehuda Levi, Edward Furlong, James Caan, Jeffrey Tambor, and Jonathan Lipnicki.

== Plot ==
In Tel Aviv, 1973, young Izek is raised in a seedy, gangster-filled illegal casino that operates behind his family's bar. When violence and crime find their way to him and his family, Izek and his family relocate to Los Angeles. Hoping to start anew, Izek pursues his ambitions and becomes successful. He falls in love with the beautiful Aline. However, the world of crime Izek tried to escape continues to dog him. Threatened by a temperamental gangster (James Caan), his criminal cousin (Oded Fehr), and a Colombian drug lord (Steven Bauer), Izek struggles for a clean slate as those close to him fall victim to the promises of quick money through crime.

== Cast ==
- Yehuda Levi as Yuda Levi
- Delphine Chanéac as Aline
- James Caan as Mickey
- Joshua Biton as Yoni
- Cody Longo as Young Izek
- Jeffrey Tambor as Mr. Solomon
- Richard Gunn as Vince
- Edward Furlong as Tommy
- Oded Fehr as Levi
- Paul Sorvino as Priest
- Steven Bauer as Colombian drug lord
- Jonathan Lipnicki as Young Yoni
- Michael Benyaer
- Hal Ozsan
- Meredith Scott Lynn
- Inbar Lavi
- Leilani Sarelle
- Robb Skyler

== Production ==
The film is based on the life of one of the executive producers.

== Release ==
Archstone Distribution gave the film a limited release in the U.S. on June 8, 2012.

== Soundtrack ==
- Ramble Tamble - Creedence Clearwater Revival
- Joy To The World - Three Dog Night
- Spirit In The Sky - Norman Greenbaum
- 20th Century Boy - T. Rex
- Mr. Desperation - Lovechild Suicide
- Black Bikini Island - Curtis Marolt
- Magic Carpet Ride - Steppenwolf
- Boo's Boogie Woogie - Boo Boo Bradley
- Call Me - Blondie
- Lonely Is The Night - Billy Squier
- Daydream Believer - Stingray Music
- You Dropped a Bomb on Me - The Minderettes
- The Stroke - Billy Squier
- Desert Queen - Chasing June
- Saved by Zero - The Fixx
- Sick Of Me - Trevor Keith
- I Ran (So Far Away) - A Flock of Seagulls
- Chutzpa - Steve Glotzer
- Argentia - Victor Orlando
- In The Air Tonight - Phil Collins
- Cult of Personality - Living Colour
- For The Love Of Money - The Hit Co.

== Reception ==
The film received 0% positive reviews on the film-critic aggregator Rotten Tomatoes. Gary Goldstein in the Los Angeles Times said the film "opens with pep, swagger and the promise of a crackling journey. But, as this mini-saga unfolds, it decelerates into an unremarkable good-guys-vs.-bad-guys tale that ends in a glaringly tension-free showdown."
