= One Kine Day =

- Directed by: Chuck Mitsui
- Written by: Chuck Mitsui
- Produced by: Torry Tukuafu
- Starring: Ryan Greer; Christa B. Allen; Janel Parrish; Nalu Boersma
- Cinematography: Michael Lohmann
- Edited by: Brett Spiegel
- Production company: Haolewood Productions
- Distributed by: Breaking Glass Pictures
- Release dates: 11 March 2011 (San Francisco International Asian American Film Festival); 30 March 2012 (US)
- Running time: 100 minutes
- Country: United States
- Language: English

One Kine Day is a 2011 American drama film directed by Chuck Mitsui, starring Ryan Greer, Christa B. Allen, Janel Parrish and Nalu Boersma.

== Cast ==
- Ryan Greer as Ralsto
- Christa B. Allen as Alea
- Janel Parrish as Leilani
- Nalu Boersma as Nalu
- Keram Malicki-Sánchez as Vegas Mike
- Sean Reilly as Sean
- Noah Parker as Sam
- Steve Parker as Barry
- Auriel P. Rickard as Richard
- Julia Nickson as Suzie
- Jolene Blalock as CC
- Leandro Solano as La'a
- Darieus Legg as Rob

== Release ==
The film premiered at the San Francisco International Asian American Film Festival on 11 March 2011.

== Reception ==
Nicole Wong of Hyphen wrote that the film "deals with serious issues through honest expressions and realistic conversations."

Dennis Harvey of Variety called the film a "modest, involving drama that hits few surprising notes but feels astutely knowledgeable about its subject."

Albert Williams of the Chicago Reader called the film "dreary" and "predictable", and wrote that Mitsui "is trying to convey the aimless banality of his characters’ lives, but instead he succumbs to it."
