= Sam Hennings =

American actor

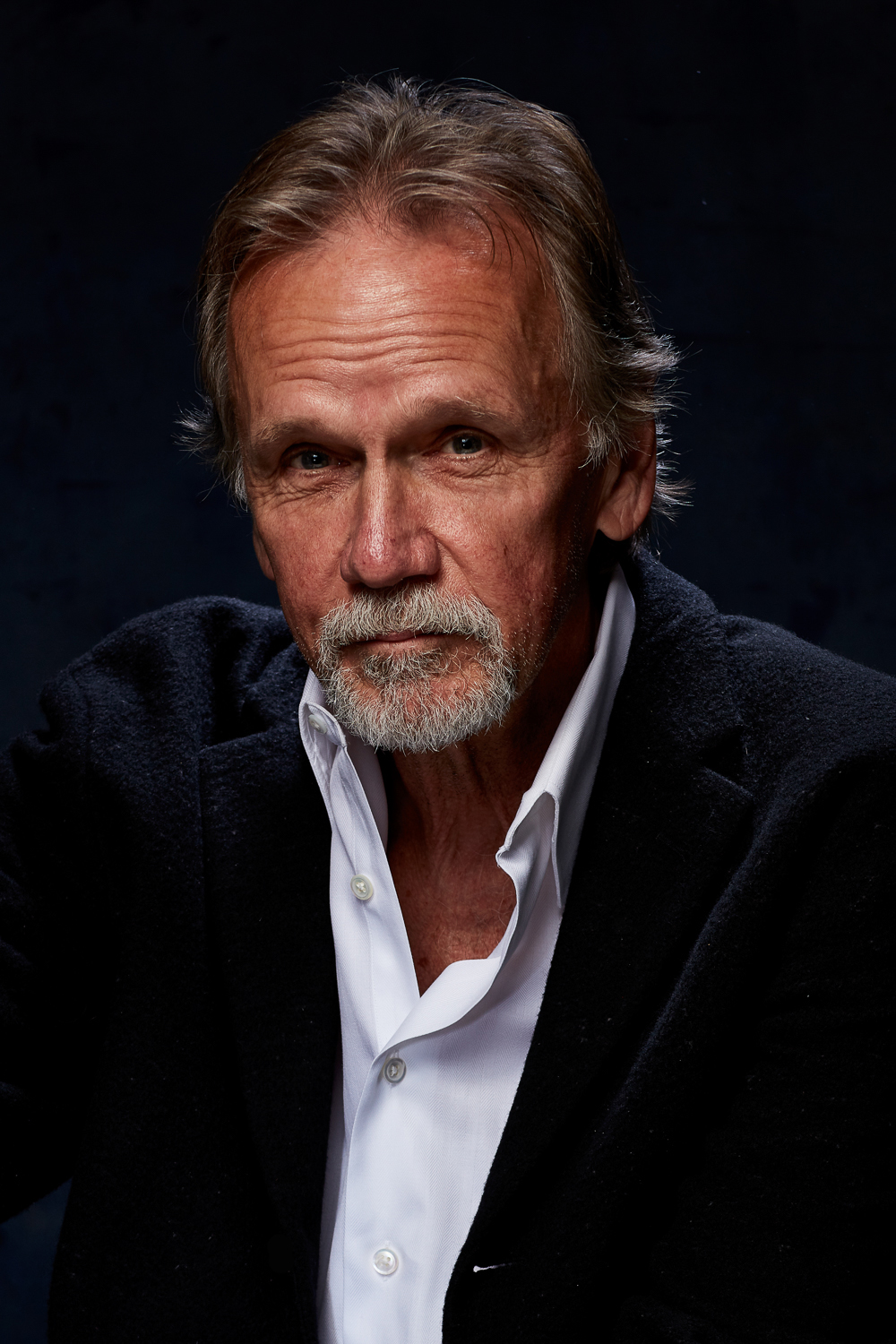
- Born: Macon, Georgia, U.S.
- Occupation: Actor
- Years active: 1985–present

Sam Hennings (born December 17) is an American actor, best known for his roles in Memphis Beat, Four Good Days, Supernatural, and his starring role in The Work and the Glory trilogy.

== Life and career ==
Born in Macon, Georgia, Hennings has lived in New York City, San Francisco, and Los Angeles for much of his acting career. He was raised in Athens, Georgia.

Hennings has been an actor since 1985. He starred in a variety of films and television shows. This included more than 90 feature films and television productions. His cinematic roles include Caddo Lake with Dylan O'Brien, The Neon Highway with Beau Bridges and Rob Mayes, Four Good Days with Glenn Close and Mila Kunis, The Work and the Glory trilogy, Martin Scorsese's The Aviator with Leonardo DiCaprio, Havoc with Anne Hathaway, Drop Zone with Wesley Snipes, Pawn Shop Chronicles with Paul Walker, Brendan Fraser, Norman Reedus, and Elijah Wood, Shout with John Travolta, Seasons of the Heart, Point Last Seen with Linda Hamilton, Final Shot: The Hank Gathers Story with George Kennedy, and Gideon Oliver: The Last Plane from Coramaya with Louis Gossett Jr., among others.

He was a series regular in Memphis Beat with Alfre Woodard and Jason Lee. He has starred in various television series including The Magnificent Seven, 24, CSI: Crime Scene Investigation and CSI: Miami, ER, E-Ring and Star Trek: The Next Generation. He had recurring roles on the CBS series JAG, Resurrection Blvd., and in Pensacola: Wings of Gold as the brother of James Brolin's character.

In 2007, he had a recurring guest role on the TNT series Saving Grace as the brother of Holly Hunter's character. In 2009, he co-starred with Josh Lucas and Jon Hamm in the thriller Stolen.

From September to October 2003, he appeared in the Los Angeles Theater in the play Ten Tricks, about a brothel madam and a magician. It was made into a film in 2006 in which Hennings also appeared.

== Filmography ==
=== Film ===
- Jo Jo Dancer, Your Life Is Calling (1986) as Policeman #2
- Mission Manila (1988) as Tony
- Private War (1988) as Joseph Bates
- Night Angel (1990) as Mr. Joseph Crenshaw
- Shout (1991) as Travis Parker
- Seedpeople (1992) as Tom Baines
- Seasons of the Heart as Jed Richards
- Drop Zone (1994) as Torski
- Indecent Behavior III (1995) as Frank Pavan
- Behind the Waterfall (1995) as Rick
- Race (1996) as Sam Dalton
- Playing Patti (1998) as Bill
- Jumping for Joy (2002) as Pete White
- The Work and the Glory (2004) as Benjamin Steed
- The Aviator (2004) as Frank
- Havoc (2005) as Mr. Rubin
- Soldier of God (2005) as Gerard de Ridfort
- The Work and the Glory II: American Zion (2005) as Benjamin Steed
- The Work and the Glory III: A House Divided (2006) as Benjamin Steed
- Stolen (2009) as Older Luke Wakefield
- Slow Moe (2010) as Frank Moebly
- Pawn Shop Chronicles (2013) as The Devil
- Literally, Right Before Aaron (2017) as Father Jack
- Juanita (2019) as Drew
- Four Good Days (2020) as Dale
- The Neon Highway (2024) as Ray
- Caddo Lake (2024) as Ben

=== Television ===
- Moonlighting (1985, episode "Pilot") as Jonathan Kaplan
- The Colbys (1985, episode "The Celebration") as Reporter #2
- Dallas (1986, episode "The Missing Link")
- Alfred Hitchcock Presents (1986, episode "Happy Birthday") as Patrolman
- Scarecrow and Mrs. King (1986, episode "Photo Finish") as Janitor
- Star Trek: The Next Generation (1988, episode "Angel One") as Ramsey
- Houston Knights (1988, episode "For Caroline") as Taylor
- On Our Own (1988, TV Movie) as Uncle Jack
- Hunter (1989, episode "The Pit") as Eric Level
- HeartBeat (1989, episode "Last Tango") as Charlie
- Gideon Oliver (1989, episode "The Last Plane from Coramaya") as Drew Lord
- Jake and the Fatman (1990, episode "It Never Entered My Mind") as Dr. Locke
- The Trials of Rosie O'Neill (1991, episode "Battle Fatigue") as Dr. Ray Waverly
- Final Shot: The Hank Gathers Story (1992, TV Movie) as Coach Spencer
- Secrets (1992 miniseries) as Roy Alsop
- Trade Winds (1993 miniseries) as Will Philips
- Murder, She Wrote (1995, episode "Shooting in Rome") as Webb Prentiss
- Pacific Blue (1996, episode "The Phoenix") as Suicide
- The Beneficiary (1997 TV Movie) as Captain Greer
- The Magnificent Seven (1998, episode "One Day Out West") as Lucas James
- Point Last Seen (1998, TV Movie) as Frank
- Soldier of Fortune, Inc. (1999, episode "Welcome to Bent Copper") as Sheriff Trapp
- Walker, Texas Ranger (1999, episodes "In Harm's Way" Part 1 and 2) as J.T. Brody
- Pensacola: Wings of Gold (1998–2000, episodes "Trials and Tribulations" and "Brothers") Lt. Col. Gilbert Seaver / Charlie Kelly
- 18 Wheels of Justice (2001, episode "A Place Called Defiance")
- Strong Medicine (2001, episode "Adverse Reactions") as Colonel Bomfeld
- JAG (1998–2001, four episodes) as Lt. Col. Ronald Vickers / Capt. Huddleston (as Sam D. Hennings)
- Resurrection Blvd. (2001–2002, episodes "El Mejor Amigo Del Hombre" and "La Nina Perdida") as Guy
- The Court (2002, episode "Back in the Bottle")
- CSI: Crime Scene Investigation (2002, 2009; episodes "Snuff" and "Better Off Dead") as Pete Banson / John Rankow
- Hunter: Return to Justice (2002, TV Movie) as Roger Prescott
- The Lone Ranger (2003, TV Movie) as Mr. Hartman
- ER (2003, episode "The Lost") as U.S. Financial Attache Steve Davison
- Homeland Security (2004, TV Movie) as ATF Agent (uncredited)
- Eyes (2005, episode "Trial") as Jack Baker
- E-Ring (2005–2006, episodes "Tribes" and "The General") as Col. David Lindstrom
- Saving Grace (2007, episodes "Pilot" and "Taco, Tulips, Duck and Spices") as Joe Hanadarko
- Eleventh Hour (2008, episode "Cardiac") as Deputy Sheriff Bill Larsson
- Dollhouse (2009, episode "True Believer") as Senator Boxbaum
- Cold Case (2009, episode "Dead Heat") as Randall Baxter '86 / '09
- CSI: Miami (2009, episode "Kill Clause") as Max DeSalvo
- The Event (2010, episode "To Keep Us Safe") as General Addington
- Look (2010, three episodes) as Bob
- Supernatural (2011, episode "Frontierland") as Samuel Colt
- Memphis Beat (2010–2011) as Charlie "Whitehead" White
- Castle (2012, episode "Til Death Do Us Part") as Seth Harris
- Criminal Minds (2012, episode "The Silencer") as US Marshal John Tilghman
- The Mentalist (2013, episode "Days of Wine and Roses") as Jeffrey Coates
- Red Widow (2013, episode "The Escape") as Orson
- Lauren (2012–2013, episodes "The Report", "The Third Man" and "#2.5") as Col. Harold
- Franklin & Bash (2013, episode "Control") as Hugh King
- Escape from Polygamy (2013, TV Movie) as Merril
- The Pitt (2026, episode "3") as Harlan Hansen
