= A Change of Seasons (film) =

1980 film by Richard Lang

- Theatrical release poster
- Directed by: Richard Lang
- Written by: Erich Segal; Martin Ranshoff; Ronni Kern; Fred Segal
- Produced by: Martin Ransohoff
- Starring: Shirley MacLaine; Anthony Hopkins; Bo Derek; Michael Brandon; Mary Beth Hurt
- Cinematography: Philip H. Lathrop
- Edited by: Don Zimmerman
- Music by: Henry Mancini
- Production companies: Film Finance Group; Polyc International BV; 20th Century Fox
- Distributed by: 20th Century Fox
- Release date: December 1, 1980
- Running time: 102 minutes
- Country: United States
- Language: English
- Budget: $6 million
- Box office: $16.4 million

A Change of Seasons is a 1980 American comedy-drama film directed by Richard Lang. It stars Anthony Hopkins, Shirley MacLaine and Bo Derek. The film was a box office success, grossing $16.4 million against its $6 million budget, but it receiving three nominations at the 1st Golden Raspberry Awards including Worst Actor (Hopkins) and Worst Screenplay.

== Plot ==
When Karyn Evans discovers her arrogantly self-centered professor husband Adam is having an affair with student Lindsey Rutledge, she is out for revenge. She retaliates by having a dalliance of her own with philosophical campus carpenter Pete Lachappelle. Adam is infuriated when he learns about his wife's new relationship, and she in turn defends her right to enjoy the same carnal pleasures he does. The four decide to share a Vermont ski house, where their efforts to behave like liberal people are tested by angst, hurt feelings, and Kasey Evans, who unexpectedly arrives to confront her parents with their outrageous behavior, who makes sure to put her parents back on the right track.

== Cast ==
- Shirley MacLaine as Karyn Evans
- Anthony Hopkins as Adam Evans
- Bo Derek as Lindsey Rutledge
- Michael Brandon as Pete Lachapelle
- Mary Beth Hurt as Kasey Evans
- Edward Winter as Steven Rutledge
- K Callan as Alice Bingham
- Rod Colbin as Sam Bingham
- Steve Eastin as Lance
- Billy Beck as Older Man
- Karen Philipp as Young Girl
- Paul Bryar as Man at Table

== Production ==
Consenting Adults was the film's working title. Originally, Noel Black was hired to direct after producer Martin Ransohoff had seen his film, A Man, a Woman, and a Bank (1979). Black left the film during shooting due to creative differences. He was replaced by Richard Lang. Black shot the first half of the film only. The film was shot on location in Glenwood Springs, Colorado and Williamstown, Massachusetts. Anthony Hopkins and Shirley MacLaine famously did not get along during the filming, and Hopkins said "she was the most obnoxious actress I have ever worked with."

The theme song "Where Do You Catch the Bus for Tomorrow?" was written by Alan and Marilyn Bergman and Henry Mancini and performed by Kenny Rankin.

== Reception ==
In his review in The New York Times, Vincent Canby said the film "exhibits no sense of humor and no appreciation for the ridiculous ... the screenplay [is] often dreadful ... the only appealing performance is Miss MacLaine's, and she's too good to be true. A Change of Seasons does prove one thing, though. A farce about characters who've been freed of their conventional obligations quickly becomes aimless."

Variety observed, "It would take the genius of an Ernst Lubitsch to do justice to the incredibly tangled relationships in A Change of Seasons, and director Richard Lang is no Lubitsch. The switching of couples seems arbitrary and mechanical, and more sour than amusing."

TV Guide rates it one out of a possible four stars, adding the film "is as predictable as a long Arctic winter, and just about as interesting ... Marybeth Hurt ... steals what there is of the picture to steal."

Time Out London calls it "kitsch without conviction, schlock without end ... glib trappings ... and witless dialogue sink everything except for the perky intelligence of MacLaine, who clearly deserves better than this."

== Awards and nominations ==
The film had the dubious distinction of garnering three nominations at the 1st Golden Raspberry Awards.

- Nominated, Worst Actor (Anthony Hopkins)
- Nominated, Worst Song ("Where Do You Catch the Bus for Tomorrow?" by Henry Mancini, Marilyn Bergman, Alan Bergman)
- Nominated, Worst Screenplay (Erich Segal, Ronni Kern, and Fred Segal)
