= True Killers =

- American Horror Story episode
- Episode no.: Season 9 Episode 4
- Directed by: Jennifer Lynch
- Written by: Jay Beattie
- Production code: 9ATS04
- Original air date: October 9, 2019
- Running time: 42 minutes

Guest appearances
- Orla Brady as Dr. Karen Hopple; Tara Karsian as Chef Bertie

Episode chronology
← Previous "Slashdance"	Next → "Red Dawn"
- American Horror Story: 1984

"True Killers" is the fourth episode of the ninth season of the anthology television series American Horror Story. It aired on October 9, 2019, on the cable network FX. The episode was written by Jay Beattie, and directed by Jennifer Lynch.

== Plot ==
Through flashbacks, it is revealed that Montana and Ramirez became lovers after meeting at Montana's aerobics class. At that time, she enlisted Ramirez to murder Brooke as revenge for the death of Montana's brother at Brooke's wedding. In the present, Xavier seeks out Bertie, the camp cook, for assistance, but Richter discovers them. Richter locks Xavier in the oven and turns it on, though a fatally wounded Bertie saves him. Now severely burnt, Xavier mercifully kills Bertie per her wishes. Brooke, meanwhile, falls into a trap set by Donna. Ramirez tracks Brooke down after being tipped off by Montana, but Richter appears. Ramirez and Richter fight, with Brooke escaping during the chaos and Ramirez apparently being killed. Richter visits Margaret, who reveals she was the actual killer in 1970 following bullying at the hands of the other camp counselors. Richter, blamed for the killings, was subsequently subjected to terrible treatments during his time in the asylum. Margaret shoots Richter. Trevor arrives after hearing the gunshots, and Margaret kills him, intending to blame his death on Richter, who has escaped. Xavier, after encountering a wounded and apparently merciful Richter, is found by Brooke. They meet up with Chet, Montana, and Margaret, who lies that Richter killed Trevor. Elsewhere, Donna witnesses Ramirez being revived by a supernatural power.

== Reception ==
"True Killers" was watched by 1.29 million people during its original broadcast, and gained a 0.6 ratings share among adults aged 18–49.

The episode received largely positive reviews. On the review aggregator Rotten Tomatoes, "True Killers" holds a 94% approval rating, based on 16 reviews with an average rating of 7.08/10. The critical consensus reads: "The plot twists keep coming in the shocking, "True Killers," but the addition of supernatural elements keep the momentum high in this sensational season."

Ron Hogan of Den of Geek gave the episode a 4/5, saying, "American Horror Story is about immediate and intense gratification. "True Killers" carries on that tradition, blowing through a lot of twists and turns. This is blood-splattered, burned, stabbed, shot, slashed, and smashed episode that unpacks the secrets of Camp Redwood." He added, "This isn't a show that leans towards subtlety, and a lot of the twists in this episode are foreshadowed very effectively throughout the run thus far. That AHS isn't even trying to extend out the plot suggests that they're fine with burning off the incredibly long night of the killing spree and have something in their pockets for the latter half of the season." He also praised the script, commenting that "Jay Beattie's script does a solid job of peppering the quippy jokes throughout and keeping the laugh lines coming without sacrificing any of the scary business.", and the directing, noticing that "Director Jennifer Lynch [...] seems to have a particular talent for creepy imagery, and making the most of her jump-scares."

Kat Rosenfield of Entertainment Weekly gave the episode a B+ rating. She praised Tara Karsian's Chef Bertie in this episode, and compared the scene where Xavier is trapped in the oven to Arthur Arden's self-immolation scene from Asylum. She also enjoyed the different twists and reveals of the episode, especially the one about Margaret's true nature. She compared the faceoff between the Night Stalker and Jingles to Freddy vs. Jason, commenting that it was "so much lamer". Finally, Rosenfield gave some positive comments about the episode cliffhanger, saying "this is American Horror Story; even when the bodies hit the floor, they rarely stay there!"

Variety's Andrea Reiher gave a positive review, as she compared the episode to a "good slasher camp movie". She also commented that "It was also a little jarring for the show to seemingly burn through so much plot (and so many characters!) by the end of Episode 4. This season is 10 episodes long; what are the remaining six going to look like?"
