= Four Good Days =

2020 American drama film

- Theatrical release poster
- Directed by: Rodrigo García
- Screenplay by: Rodrigo García; Eli Saslow
- Based on: "How's Amanda? A Story of Truth, Lies and an American Addiction" by Eli Saslow
- Produced by: Rodrigo García; Jon Avnet; Jake Avnet; Marina Grasic; Jai Khanna
- Starring: Glenn Close; Mila Kunis; Stephen Root; Sam Hennings
- Cinematography: Igor Jadue-Lillo
- Edited by: Lauren Connelly
- Music by: Edward Shearmur
- Production companies: Indigenous Media; Oakhurst Entertainment; Productivity Media
- Distributed by: Vertical Entertainment
- Release dates: January 25, 2020 (Sundance); April 30, 2021 (United States)
- Running time: 100 minutes
- Country: United States
- Language: English
- Box office: $864,091

Four Good Days is a 2020 American drama film, directed and produced by Rodrigo García, from a screenplay by García and Eli Saslow, based upon Saslow's 2016 Washington Post article "How's Amanda? A Story of Truth, Lies and an American Addiction". It stars Glenn Close, Mila Kunis, and Stephen Root.

The film had its world premiere at the Sundance Film Festival on January 25, 2020. It was released in a limited release on April 30, 2021, followed by video on demand on May 21, 2021, by Vertical Entertainment. At the 94th Academy Awards, the film's lead single "Somehow You Do" was nominated for Best Original Song.

== Plot ==
A year after last seeing her, 31-year-old Margaret "Molly" Wheeler walks to her mother Deb's house remembering times before she suffered from addiction to drugs, which began when doctors gave her 75 oxycodone to treat a sprained knee. She insists that she is ready to be sober and begs her mother to allow her to stay for a few days before going to detox. Deb, although ambivalent about the matter, stands resolute with the support of her husband Chris, fearing that aiding Molly in any way will serve as being an enabler. Molly spends the night outside her mother's house and is persistent about her recovery. The next morning a frustrated Deb agrees to take Molly to detox. Upon arrival, it is revealed that Molly has suffered from addiction for over a decade, has lost custody of her children, and is on her 15th attempt at recovery. Four days after commencing detox, she is offered naltrexone, an opioid antagonist, in order to help her on the road to sobriety. However, she must stay off any drugs for an additional four days before it is safe for her to receive the first shot, and then expect an additional shot each month.

On her first day at home, Molly learns through Deb about many of her actions due to suffering from addiction, many of which Molly clearly regrets. Deb remains suspicious of Molly's intentions, but by the end of the day, secretly begins to have hope.

On the second day, Sean, Molly's ex, allows her to see their children. Although initially reluctant, they are happy to see her and make the most of their time together. She and Deb go grocery shopping, where they see Coach Miller, who invites Molly to speak to her class about drug addiction. Back at home, Deb reveals she was very unhappy with Molly's father, Dale, as she felt forced into marriage after becoming pregnant with Molly's older sister, Ashley, and this led to her walking out on the family. Molly has always held this abandonment against Deb and believes her addiction resulted from these events. Deb dismisses this, admitting that Dale's implied mental and emotional abuse was the reason for her leaving, much to Molly's surprise.

Molly speaks to Coach Miller's class on her third day at home. While speaking to the class, she releases her emotions, and is blatant and transparent with the children about her situation and experiences, using the moment to vent. This causes Deb to openly express her optimism and hopes that this time, Molly will finally be able to recover. Afterwards, Molly asks that Deb take her to see Sammy, a friend and fellow addict. There, Deb has a chance encounter with Molly's ex-boyfriend Eric, who inadvertently reveals that Molly was pregnant. Molly later confides in Deb that she was pregnant, but chose to place the baby for adoption. That evening, Molly receives a phone call from the detox center and learns that due to issues with her health insurance, she cannot get proper medical treatment for her disease (the shot) until Monday, adding an additional three days to her wait and the struggle against her condition. A suspicious Deb questions the call, they argue, and Molly leaves with Sean.

The additional days become excruciating for Deb as she attempts to contact Molly incessantly to no avail. On Monday morning, Molly arrives at the house urging Deb to get ready so they will not miss her appointment at the detox facility. However, before they leave Molly asks Deb for her urine, confirming Deb's suspicions. Molly further confides that she has relapsed. Despite this, she is adamant that she does wish to get well again, and Deb provides her urine. At the center, Molly receives the opioid antagonist shot, but due to her having drugs in her system, she goes into acute withdrawal, and they rush to the hospital.

Four months later, Molly is still living with Deb, visits her children regularly, is getting ready for her next shot, and is on her way to recovery. The film ends with a line about the real-life mother and daughter who inspired the film, Amanda Wendler (Molly) and Libby Alexander (Deb).

== Cast ==
- Glenn Close as Deb – based on Libby Alexander
- Mila Kunis as Molly – based on Amanda Wendler
- Stephen Root as Chris
- Joshua Leonard as Sean
- Sam Hennings as Dale
- Michael Hyatt as Lisa
- Carla Gallo as Ashley
- Nicholas Oteri as Corey
- Audrey Lynn as Chloe
- Carlos Lacamara as Dr. Ortiz
- Rebecca Field as Coach Miller
- Chad Lindberg as Eric

== Production ==
It was announced in May 2019 that Glenn Close and Mila Kunis were set to star in the film. Stephen Root was cast in September, with filming beginning later that month in Los Angeles. In October 2019, Chad Lindberg, Rebecca Field, Joshua Leonard, Michael Hyatt and Sam Hennings joined the cast of the film.

== Music ==
On April 23, 2021, "Somehow You Do", the lead single from the movie's soundtrack, was released. The song was written by Diane Warren and performed by country star Reba McEntire, who noted on her Instagram that she was "so proud to be associated with these three very powerful women", referencing Warren, Close and Kunis. "Somehow You Do" was nominated for an Academy Award for Best Original Song.

== Release ==
It had its world premiere at the Sundance Film Festival on January 25, 2020. In March 2021, Vertical Entertainment acquired U.S. distribution rights to the film, and set it for April 30, 2021, limited release prior to a May 21, 2021, video on demand release.

== Reception ==
On Rotten Tomatoes, the film has an approval rating of 54% based on 78 reviews with an average rating of 5.80/10. The site's critical consensus reads, "Four Good Days struggles to bring authenticity to its tragic source material and strands its talent in a bland melodrama." Metacritic assigned the film a weighted average score of 52 out of 100, based on ten critics, indicating "mixed or average" reviews.

== See also ==
- The Basketball Diaries (film)
- Ben Is Back
- Beautiful Boy (2018 film)
