= The Neon Highway =

- Theatrical poster
- Directed by: William Wages
- Written by: Phillip Rob Bellury; William Wages
- Produced by: Stratton Leopold
- Starring: Rob Mayes; Beau Bridges; Sam Hennings; T.J. Power; Lee Brice; Pam Tillis; Jennifer Bowles; Sandra Lee-Oian Thomas; Wilbur T. Fitzgerald; Brett Gentile
- Cinematography: Paul Krumper
- Edited by: Cindy Parisotto
- Music by: Arturo Sandoval
- Production company: Mountain Movies
- Distributed by: Sessions Production Payroll
- Release dates: February 27, 2024 (Plex); March 13, 2024 (Nashville); March 15, 2024 (United States)
- Country: United States
- Language: English
- Budget: $3 million

The Neon Highway is a 2024 American drama film written by Phillip Rob Bellury and William Wages, directed by Wages and starring Rob Mayes, Beau Bridges and Sam Hennings.

== Plot ==
Wayne Collins pursues a career as a country music singer-songwriter in Nashville but his plans are derailed after he is involved in a car accident. Seven years later, he is economically struggling with a 9 to 5 job to support his family until he meets Claude Allen, a famous country musician near the end of his career. The two form a partnership to pair Collins's songwriting and Allen's fame but face a challenge when they find the changing country music industry is not interested in recording their song.

== Cast ==
- Rob Mayes as Wayne Collins
- Beau Bridges as Claude Allen
- Sam Hennings as Ray
- T.J. Power as Lloyd Collins
- Lee Brice as Lamont Johnson
- Pam Tillis as Herself
- Jennifer Bowles as Ginny Collins
- Sandra Lee-Oian Thomas as Pepper Dewberry
- Wilbur T. Fitzgerald as Buck Bates
- Brett Gentile as Elton

== Production ==
Filming occurred in Columbus, Georgia, in March 2021. Filming also occurred in Pine Mountain, Harris County, Georgia, and Hamilton, Georgia.

== Release ==
Film producer Stratton Leopold stated in a November 2023 interview with the Ledger-Enquirer: "We’ll premiere on the 27th of February. It’ll be the first of March in the theaters." In February 2024, it was announced that the film will be released in theaters on March 15, 2024, after a premiere in Nashville on March 13. The film also was released via streaming on February 27, 2024. The movie then made its Netflix debut in the US on July 11, 2024.

== Reception ==
On the review aggregator website Rotten Tomatoes, 64% of 11 critics' reviews are positive, with an average rating of 6/10.
