= Duane Davis =

American actor

- Born: Cleveland, Ohio, US
- Education: University of Missouri
- Occupations: Film, television actor
- Children: Wyatt Davis
- Father: Willie Davis

Duane Davis is an American actor who has been in films such as Under Siege, The Program, Ghosts of Mars, and Paparazzi.

== Early life ==
Davis was born in Cleveland, Ohio, and is the son of NFL Hall of Fame defensive end Willie Davis and Ann Davis. At the age of two he moved to Wisconsin. Davis played college football at the University of Missouri but suffered a knee injury in his sophomore and senior year.

== Acting career ==
He has made something of a career of playing athletes—famous or otherwise. Davis played an athlete in the 1988 film, A Nightmare on Elm Street 4: The Dream Master. In 1991, Davis starred as Texas State wide receiver Featherstone in Necessary Roughness, and he said he did not have to act much as a wide receiver who could not catch passes. Davis pulled his hamstring during filming of the movie but said it was one of his most enjoyable roles. He was in the 1992 Stephen Seagal film, Under Siege. Davis's most celebrated role is as ESU football star Alvin Mack in the 1993 film, The Program. During filming, he broke the metacarpal in his hand and refused to do a scene in which his character broke his leg, as it was too close to his own college experience. He claims that fans still come up to him and repeat his lines. In 1994 he appeared in the Showtime original movie, Past Tense, and the following year he played Buster Douglas in the HBO original movie, Tyson. Davis starred as Bo Kimble in Final Shot: The Hank Gathers Story. He played Joe Louis in the 1999 made-for-TV movie about Rocky Marciano. In 2001 he played the part of Uno in Ghosts of Mars, and in 2004 he appeared in Paparazzi as Reggie.

Davis played Duke DePalma, a former boxer-turned-crime fighter, in Team Knight Rider, a short-lived spin-off series of the original Knight Rider TV series. He played a recurring character in Sisters, and has been in other TV shows such as M.A.N.T.I.S., L.A. Law, A Different World, What's Happening Now, Head of the Class, and Little Big League. He played a boxer in the movie, Diggstown, and also had a small role in Carl Reiner's 1987 comedy film, Summer School.

== Personal life ==
Davis lives in California. His youngest son, Wyatt Davis, played college football at Ohio State and was selected in the 3rd round of the 2021 NFL draft by the Minnesota Vikings of the National Football League. His oldest son, David Davis played collegiate football as well.

== Selected filmography ==
- Summer School (1987) as Jerome Watkins (Bathroom Guy)
