= Point Last Seen =

1998 television film by Elodie Keene

- Genre: Drama
- Based on: Point Last Seen: A Woman Tracker's Story by Hannah Nyala
- Teleplay by: Ronni Kern
- Directed by: Elodie Keene
- Starring: Linda Hamilton; Kevin Kilner; Sam Hennings
- Theme music composer: Stewart Levin
- Country of origin: United States
- Original language: English

Production
- Cinematography: James Bartle
- Editor: Ron Spang
- Running time: 96 minutes

Original release
- Network: CBS
- Release: November 24, 1998

Point Last Seen is an American television film that originally aired on November 24, 1998. Linda Hamilton, Kevin Kilner and Sam Hennings star in the film. The film is based on the book Point Last Seen: A Woman Tracker's Story by Hannah Nyala.

== Plot ==
Rachel Harrison feels abandoned by the justice system when her aggressive husband Kevin kidnaps their two children Jon and Ruthie. Embittered, she withdraws into the desert, where she becomes a tracker for missing people. When Mrs. Ellis' daughter Mandy disappears, Rachel is again confronted with her own emotions.

== Cast ==
- Linda Hamilton as Rachel Harrison
  - Kieren van den Blink as Young Rachel Harrison
- Kevin Kilner as Kevin Harrison
- Sam Hennings as Frank
- Mary Kay Place as Coreen Davis
- Kory Thompson as Jon Harrison
- Holly Belnap as Ruthie Harrison
  - Kara Darland as Young Ruthie Harrison
- Dana Reilly as Mrs. Ellis
- Nicole Barrera as Mandy Ellis
- Joseph Adams as Jason
- Johann Benét as Jake
- Joel Cooper as Bailiff
- Sanford Gibbons as Sheriff Don

== Production ==
The film was shot on Gold Canyon, Arizona from September 28 to October 21, 1998.

== Reception ==
David Parkinson for Radio Times gave the film three out of five stars, praising Linda Hamilton's performance, saying "Linda Hamilton gives a credible performance", but criticized that the story "is somewhat diminished by the lowbrow TV-movie approach that includes corny flashbacks."

Writing for Variety, Laura Fries gave the film a positive review, with her summary reading, "Although this movie touches on familiar themes often exploited in the movie of the week genre, Point Last Seen is by no means your typical woman in jeopardy pic. Deliberately paced, this drama benefits from Ronni Kern's intelligent script, based on the nonfiction book by Hannah Nyala, and an understated but emotional performance by Linda Hamilton."
