= The Sound (film) =

- Theatrical release poster
- Directed by: Jenna Mattison
- Written by: Jenna Mattison
- Produced by: Geoff Hart; Jenna Mattison; Allan Ungar; Michele Weisler; Bill Viola Jr.
- Starring: Rose McGowan; Michael Eklund; Christopher Lloyd; Richard Gunn
- Cinematography: Pasha Patriki
- Edited by: Michael P. Mason
- Music by: Aaron Gilhuis
- Production companies: Hackybox Pictures; North Hollywood Films; WeatherVane Productions
- Distributed by: Orion Pictures; Samuel Goldwyn Films
- Release date: September 29, 2017
- Running time: 92 minutes
- Country: Canada
- Language: English

The Sound (formerly titled Lower Bay) is an independent Canadian psychological thriller film written and directed by Jenna Mattison in her directorial debut. The film is purportedly based on true events. The film stars Rose McGowan, Michael Eklund, Christopher Lloyd, and Richard Gunn. Filming began in Toronto in May 2015.

The eponymous "sound" in the film refers to infrasound, which plays a large role in the film.

== Cast ==
- Rose McGowan as Kelly Johansen, a best-selling author and paranormal investigator who is also a skeptic of the supernatural
- Michael Eklund as Detective John Richards,
- Christopher Lloyd as a maintenance man working in the station tunnels
- Richard Gunn as Ethan, Kelly's fiancé
- Jane Moffett
- Alex Braunstein
- Michael Giel

== Production ==
Principal photography on the film began in early May 2015 in Toronto.

== Release ==
The film was released on 29 September 2017.
