= Eli Saslow =

American journalist (born 1982)

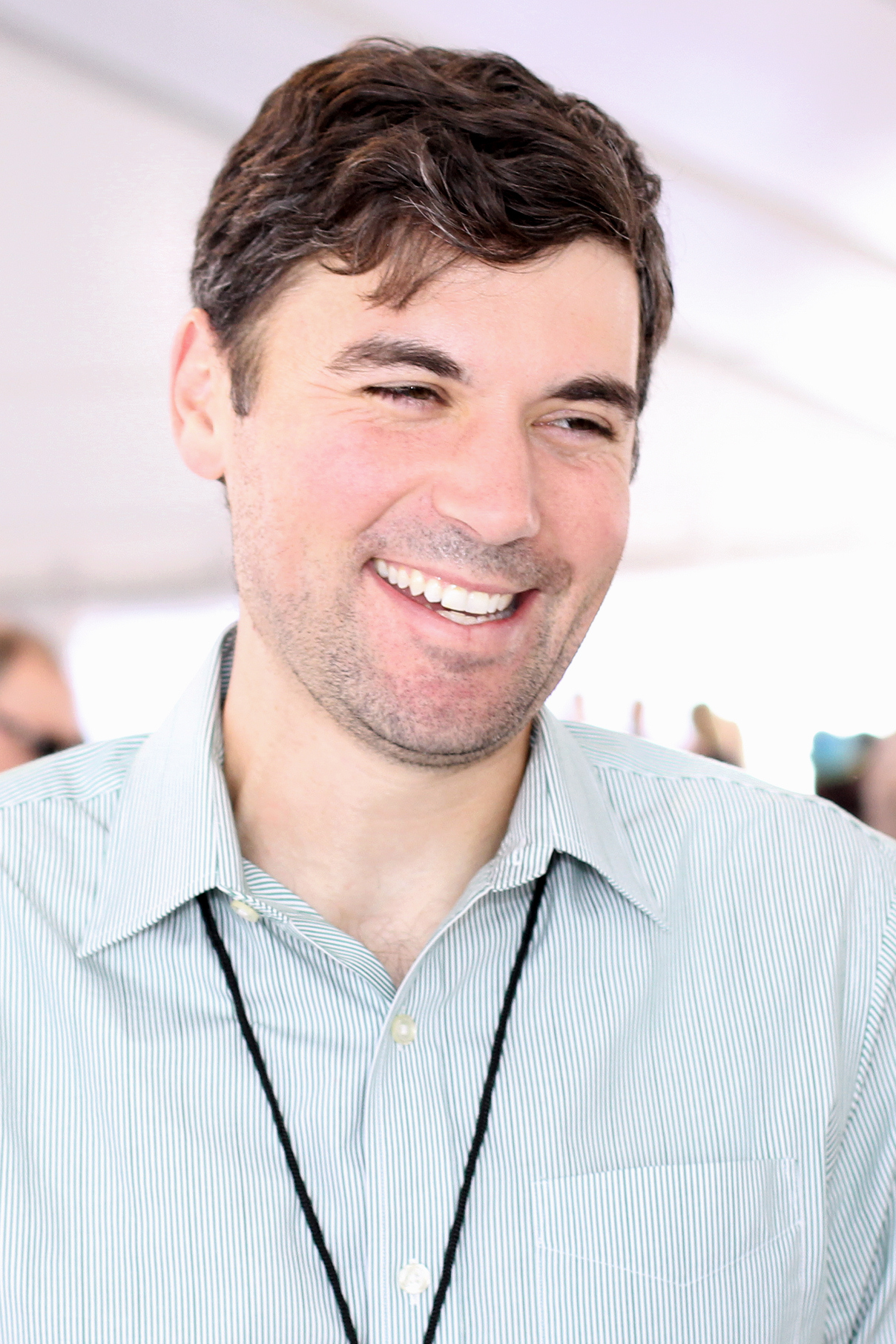
- Saslow at the 2018 Texas Book Festival
- Born: May 15, 1982 (age 44); Littleton, Colorado, U.S.
- Education: Syracuse University
- Occupation: Sportscaster Screenwriter
- Years active: 2004–present
- Employer(s): The New York Times; The Washington Post; ESPN The Magazine
- Awards: Pulitzer Prize (2014, 2023); George Polk award (2013, 2020); Dayton Literary Peace Prize (2019)

Eli Eric Saslow (born May 15, 1982) is an American journalist, currently a writer-at-large for The New York Times. He has also written for The Washington Post and ESPN The Magazine. He is a 2014 and a 2023 winner of the Pulitzer Prize, a recipient of the George Polk award and other honors. He was also a finalist for the Pulitzer Prize in feature writing in 2013, 2016 and 2017. He is a Writers Guild of America screenwriter, and the co-writer for Four Good Days, which stars Mila Kunis and Glenn Close and was nominated for an Academy Award. He has published three books, including the best-selling Rising Out of Hatred, which won the 2019 Dayton Literary Peace Prize.

== Education ==
He attended Heritage High School, in Littleton, Colorado, graduating in 2000, and is a 2004 graduate of the S.I. Newhouse School of Public Communications at Syracuse University.

== Work ==
Saslow's 2018 book Rising Out of Hatred: The Awakening of a Former White Nationalist was the winner of the 2019 Dayton Literary Peace Prize for Nonfiction.

He is the author of Ten Letters: The Stories Americans Tell Their President (Random House, 2012), and four of his works have appeared in the anthology The Best American Sports Writing.

== Personal life ==
Saslow is married and lives in Portland, Oregon. He has three children.

== Books ==
- Voices from the Pandemic: Americans Tell Their Stories of Crisis, Courage and Resilience
- Saslow, Eli (2012). Ten Letters: the Stories Americans Tell Their President. New York: Anchor Books. ISBN 978-0307742551..
- Saslow, Eli (2018). Rising Out of Hatred: The Awakening of a Former White Nationalist. New York: Penguin Random House. ISBN 9780385542869..
