= Jayson Blair (actor) =

American actor

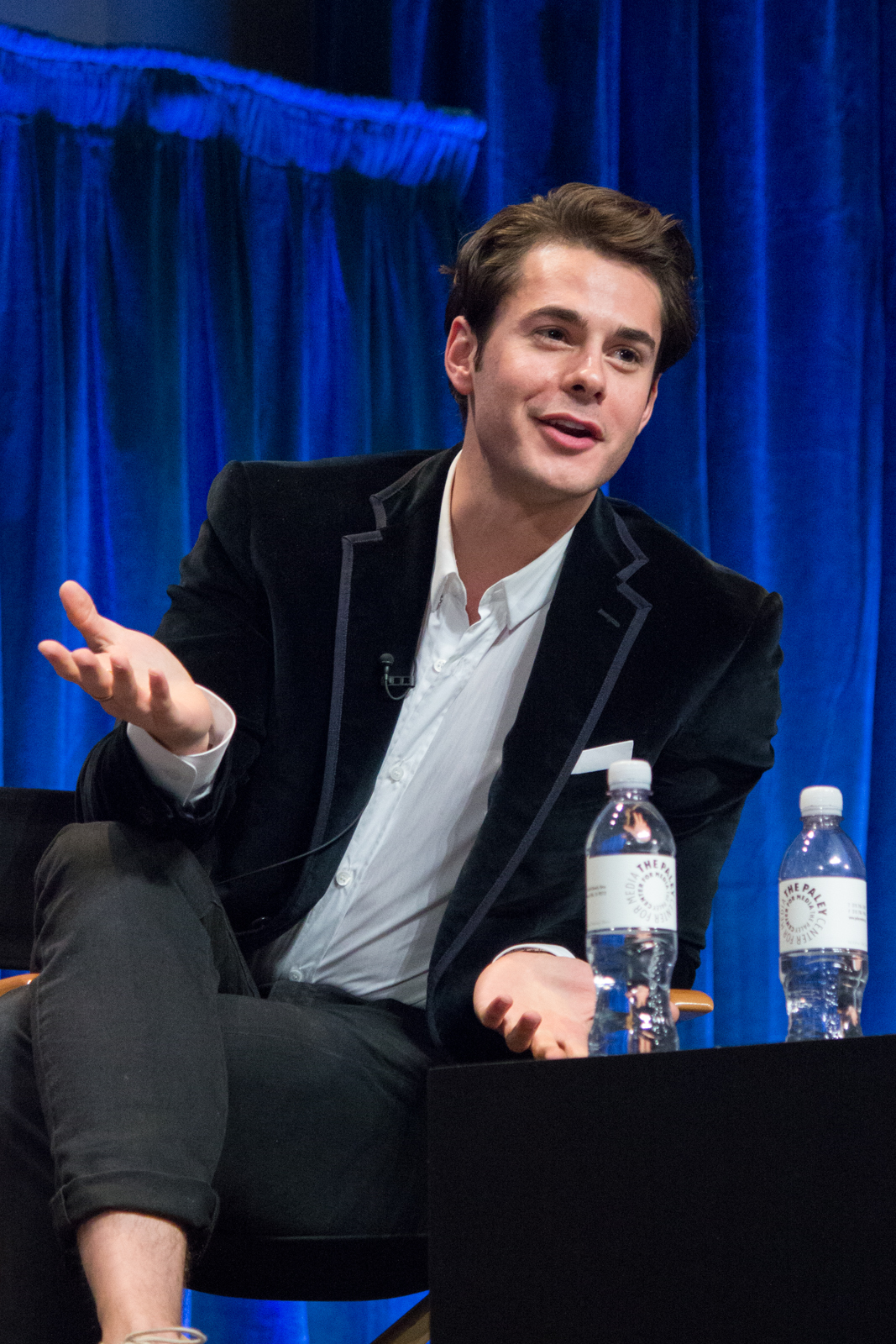
- Blair at the PaleyFest 2013 panel for The New Normal
- Born: 1985 or 1986 (age 39–40); Detroit, Michigan, United States
- Occupation: Actor
- Years active: 2006–present

Jayson Blair (born 1985 or 1986) is an American actor. He has appeared in many films and television series, including being a cast member of the sitcoms The Hard Times of RJ Berger (2010–2011) and The New Normal (2012–2013).

== Early life ==
Blair was born in Detroit, Michigan. He attended L'Anse Creuse High School-North in Macomb Township, Michigan, where he played tennis.

== Career ==
After graduating in 2001, Blair performed in commercials for Taco Bell, Pizza Hut and the Honda Civic.

== Filmography ==
=== Film ===
Year	Title	Role	Notes
2006	Convincing Benny	Checking Out Guy	Short film
2007	Succubus: Hell Bent	Jason	
2008	Big Game	Mark	
2009	Murder Squad	Ryan Newcomb	Short film
2010	The Steamroom	God Squad Guy	
2010	Public Relations	Kevin	
2012	Detention of the Dead	Brad	
2013	In Sickness and In Health	Brian	Short film
2014	Whiplash	Travis	
2014	Stuck	Rick	
2014	Free Fall	Ray	
2016	The Dog Lover	Will Holloway	
2017	Unforgettable	Jason	
2018	Haunting on Fraternity Row	Tanner	
2019	Married Young	Stuart	
2019	Trip's Duplage	Officer Everly	Short film
2021	Venus as a Boy	Micah	

=== Television ===
Year	Title	Role	Notes
2006	CSI: NY	Albert Linehart / "Y Monster"	Episode: "Oedipus Hex"
2008	Hot Hot Los Angeles	Ty	7 episodes
2009	My Date	Stephan	Episode: "Love Is Blind"
2009	Glee	Chris	Episode: "The Rhodes Not Taken"
2009	Heroes	Young Nathan Petrelli	Episode: "Acceptance"
2010	Rizzoli & Isles	Brandon Lewis	Episode: "She Works Hard for the Money"
2010–2011	The Hard Times of RJ Berger	Max Owens	Main role; 24 episodes
2011	Criminal Minds: Suspect Behavior	Mike	Episode: "Jane"
2011	The Protector	Frederick Ralston	Episode: "Safe"
2012	The Closer	Paul Woods	Episode: "Fool's Gold"
2012	2 Broke Girls	Brendon	Episode: "And the Spring Break"
2012	Drop Dead Diva	Chase Black	Episode: "Jane's Getting Married"
2012–2013	The New Normal	Clay Clemmens	Main role; 22 episodes
2015–2016	Young & Hungry	Jake Kaminski	5 episodes
2016	Cooper Barrett's Guide to Surviving Life	Thom	Episode: "How to Survive Being a Plus One"
2016	12 Deadly Days	Freddie Fishstick	2 episodes
2018	Life Sentence	Aiden Abbott	Main role; 13 episodes
2019	Mom	DJ	Episode: "Goat Yogurt and Ample Parking"
2020	9-1-1	Jake	Episode: "The Taking of Dispatch 9-1-1"
2021	Good Trouble	Tony Britton	15 episodes
2021	Brand New Cherry Flavor	Jules Brandenberg	3 episodes
2022	Dollface	Liam	4 episodes
2026	Beef	Brandon	Episode: "The Hour of Separation"
