= BYUtv =

American television channel

- Country: United States
- Broadcast area: United States, worldwide
- Affiliates: KBYU-TV
- Headquarters: Provo, Utah, United States

Programming
- Language: English
- Picture format: 1080i (HDTV) (HD feed downgraded to letterboxed 480i for SDTVs)

Ownership
- Owner: Brigham Young University

History
- Launched: January 1, 2000

Links
- Webcast: www.byutv.org/livetv
- Website: www.byutv.org

Availability

Terrestrial
- Provo/Salt Lake City area: KBYU-TV 11.1
- Pago Pago, American Samoa: K11UU-D 11.4
- Phoenix, Arizona: KGRY-LD 28.1

Streaming media
- Service(s): Frndly TV

BYUtv is an American television channel and free family-friendly streaming service, founded in 2000, which is owned and operated as a part of Brigham Young University (BYU). The channel, available on most smart TVs or through cable and satellite distributors in the United States, produces original series and documentaries, including in the genres of comedy, history, lifestyle, music and drama. BYUtv also regularly broadcasts feature films, nature documentaries, acquired dramas, and religious programs (consistent with the university's sponsoring organization, the Church of Jesus Christ of Latter-day Saints). Additionally, BYUtv Sports was the primary broadcaster of BYU Cougars athletics, producing more than 125 live sporting events in 2012 alone. These broadcast rights ended in 2023. The channel has won multiple regional Emmy Awards, a national Children's and Family Emmy Award, and several of its original series have been praised by national television critics.

BYUtv broadcasts all of its original content, and most acquired content, worldwide online via its website. BYUtv is also carried through KBYU-TV, a television station in Provo, Utah, also owned by the university, ensuring HD coverage across Salt Lake City and most of Utah. The channel is one of several operated by the university's BYU Broadcasting division, including the world feed BYUtv Global and BYUradio. Several celebrity guests and artists have made special appearances on BYUtv, notably Imagine Dragons and Neon Trees on the series AUDIO-FILES; Lea Salonga, Howard Jones, Duncan Sheik and Sixpence None the Richer on The Song That Changed My Life; and Shawn Bradley, The Piano Guys, and Mates of State on Studio C. Professional athletes including Steve Young, Ty Detmer, and Jimmer Fredette have also appeared on special BYUtv Sports broadcasts.

== History ==
Old BYU TV logo (2001-2019)

BYUtv was founded in 2000, and has grown from a "relatively unknown cable channel on a single satellite" to a national provider on Dish Network, DirecTV, and over 600 cable systems in the US.

During 2010 and 2011, new BYUtv director of content Scott Swofford commissioned focus groups targeting TV viewers who were at least nominally religious, to see what they liked, disliked and wanted on TV. Swofford summarized the results as, "We want to be entertained. Then we'll stick around for the message." This led to the creation of the pilot for Granite Flats, which became BYUtv's first and flagship original scripted television drama series, and went on to expand the channel's audience, eventually attracting about 500,000 viewers per episode, compared to the previous top-rated show, Love of Quilting, which typically drew under 10,000 viewers.

== Programming ==
BYUtv produces shows under several categories: BYU Sports, Campus, Documentary, Faith, Family, Lifestyle, People, and Performing Arts. This includes original series, documentaries, and religious service programs, along with family and faith-based films licensed from Disney Entertainment Distribution and Sony Pictures Television.

=== Original series ===
- 9 Years to Neptune
- After Further Review
- A Kind of Spark
- All-Round Champion
- Amelia Parker
- American Ride
- artFUL
- Battle of the Ages
- Best Cake Wins
- BYU Sports Nation
- BYU Sports Nation Gameday (originally Countdown to Kickoff and Countdown to Tipoff)
- BYU Sports Nation Post Game (originally BYUtv Sports Post Game)
- The Canterville Ghost
- Chef Brad
- Come Follow Up
- Coordinators' Corner
- Dinner Takes All
- Dwight in Shining Armor
- Extinct
- Family Rules
- The Fixers
- The Food Nanny
- The Generations Project
- Grace Notes
- Granite Flats
- Hello Sunday
- Holly Hobbie (seasons 4–5)
- How I Got Here
- Jeff's Homemade Game Show
- Just Like Mom and Dad
- Making Good
- Operation Awesome
- Overlord and the Underwoods
- Malory Towers
- Painting the Town with Eric Dowdle
- Parents in Progress
- The Parker Andersons
- Random Acts
- Relative Race
- Relative Race: After the Finish Line
- Ruby and the Well
- Saving Me
- Show Offs
- The Story Trek
- Story Trek: Trending
- Studio C
- Survivalists
- Tales From Outer Suburbia
- Tricked (seasons 2-3)
- Turning Point
- Wayne Brady's Comedy IQ
- The Wizard of Paws

=== Acquired programming ===
- Food Factory
- Gym Stars
- Heartland
- Hetty Feather
- Highway to Heaven
- Holly Hobbie (seasons 1–3)
- The Inspectors
- Itch
- Muster Dogs
- Silverpoint
- The Chosen
- Theodosia
- Tricked (season 1)
- Wind at My Back

=== Religious programming ===
Religious programming derives from the Church of Jesus Christ of Latter-day Saints, which owns and operates BYU. Some religious programming airs on Sundays or in the early morning on BYUtv:

- BYU devotionals and forums
- BYU's Education Week and Women's Conference
- Church Educational System and church devotionals
- General Conference broadcasts and rebroadcasts
- Music and the Spoken Word

=== BYU Sports ===
The channel was the primary home for most telecasts of BYU Cougars athletics, including select home and away games for football, men's and women's basketball, baseball, softball, gymnastics, men's and women's volleyball and women's soccer. Beginning in 2009, the network also began covering BYU-Hawaii Seasiders sports, including all conference home games in women's volleyball and men's basketball, as well as select conference home games in women's basketball and additional non-conference home games for men's basketball.

In 2011, BYUtv added the WCC Men's and Women's Basketball Tournaments to their sports broadcasts. BYUtv produced the first round and quarterfinals of the men's and women's basketball tournaments, which were also broadcast on ESPN3.com.

In 2011, ESPN reached a deal to broadcast home games of the newly independent BYU Cougars football team. At least one home game per season would air live on BYUtv, along with reruns on BYUtv of home games broadcast on ESPN's networks. Its coverage also included pre-game and post-game shows, with the pre-game show Countdown to Kickoff hosted by BYU Cougars alumni Alema Harrington, Dave McCann and a rotating panel of analysts: Gary Sheide, Blaine Fowler, David Nixon, Brian Logan, and Jan Jorgensen. In 2014, Spencer Linton replaced Harrington on the panel.

Additionally, the network launched a separate website for its sports coverage, Byutvsports.com, in partnership with ESPN and IMG College. The site features news, video and free video on demand streaming of recent games. The site folded back into byutv.org in fall 2015.

The channel also produces its own sports shows including BYU Sports Nation (weekdays, 1 hr), BYU Sports Nation Game Day (formerly Countdown to Kickoff, preceding each football game), Postgame Show (following each football game), After Further Review (weekly), Inside BYU Football (weekly) and previously carried Bronco Mendenhall's post-game press conferences for football games.

With BYU joining the Big 12 in the 2023–24 season, BYU TV no longer carries most Cougars sports telecasts, due to a contract with ESPN+ to hold the third-tier media rights of all teams in the Big 12. The ESPN+ telecasts are produced by BYU staff, and BYU TV continues to carry studio programming and men's volleyball, as men's volleyball is not part of the Big 12. Since Men's volleyball is part of the Mountain Pacific Sports Federation they are allowed to carry those rights with half the broadcasts being streamed at byutv.org and the other half being tape delayed on the network with Big Ten Plus getting the live rights.

== Availability ==
BYUtv is available on a variety of streaming platforms and devices, including:

- Streaming Devices: Roku, Apple TV, Fire TV, Android TV, Google TV, and Xumo/X1.
- Smart TVs: Samsung Smart TVs (2020-2024), LG Smart TVs (2019-2024), Vizio TVs, and Sony TVs with Google TV.
- Gaming Consoles: Xbox.
- Mobile Devices: Android and iOS.
- Web: The BYUtv app is accessible on the latest desktop and mobile browsers, including Firefox, Chrome, and Safari. The official website is byutv.org

Additionally, BYUtv is available through many cable companies, making it accessible to a wide audience across various platforms.
