= Ronni Kern =

American film producer

- Born: United States
- Occupation(s): Screenwriter, film producer, television producer, television writer

Ronni Kern is an American film and television writer and producer. Kern is best known for writing such films as American Pop and A Change of Seasons, as well the miniseries and television movies Helen of Troy, Homeless to Harvard (for which she won the Christopher Award) and Jesse Stone: Sea Change. She has also written three novels, Wandering Boy in 2013, Uncharted in 2018 and Duck! in 2018. Her novella The Key was published by Storylandia on March 1, 2021.

== Selected filmography ==
- Jesse Stone: Thin Ice (2009) (TV movie)
- Jesse Stone: Sea Change (2007) (TV movie)
- Blue Smoke (2007) (TV movie)
- Homeless to Harvard: The Liz Murray Story (2003) (TV movie)
- The Princess and the Marine (2001) (TV movie)
- Deep in My Heart (1999) (TV movie)
- Point Last Seen (1998) (TV movie)
- In My Sister's Shadow (1997) (TV movie)
- Solomon & Sheba (1995) (TV movie)
- Guinevere (1994) (TV movie)
- American Pop (1981)
- A Change of Seasons (1980)
