= Kevin Kilner =

American television and film actor (born 1958)

- Born: May 3, 1958 (age 68); Baltimore, Maryland, U.S.
- Education: Johns Hopkins University
- Occupation: Actor
- Years active: 1989–present
- Spouse: Jordan Baker (m. 1998)

Kevin Kilner (born May 3, 1958) is an American television and film actor.

== Life and career ==
Kilner was born in Baltimore, Maryland, the son of Dorothea, a kindergarten teacher, and Edward Kilner, who worked in advertising sales and insurance. He went to Dulaney High School in Baltimore County. He made his first television appearance on an episode of The Cosby Show in 1989. He is perhaps best known for playing Nick in Smart House as well as the protagonist in the first season of Earth: Final Conflict and Officer Dean in The Stoned Age.

He appeared on Broadway in 1994 in a production of Tennessee Williams's The Glass Menagerie costarting Calista Flockhart and Julie Harris. In the New York Times, critic David Richards called Kilner "the real discovery of this production," adding that he "is tall and strapping, and looks like the glossy male models in 1940's magazines."

In 1995-96, Kilner starred in Almost Perfect as the romantic interest of Nancy Travis, who played a screenwriter, but Kilner was written out of the show in the second-season premiere. In 2009, he appeared on two episodes of the Joss Whedon show Dollhouse.

Kilner is an alumnus of Dulaney High School and the Johns Hopkins University in Baltimore. While attending Johns Hopkins he was a member of the National Champion lacrosse team.

From June 30 to July 16, 2006, he appeared on stage in the Alley Theatre production of Wait Until Dark.

== Filmography ==
=== Film ===
Year	Title	Role	Notes
1991	Switch	Dan Jones	
1991	Under Surveillance	Nick Parruso	
1993	Twenty Bucks	Gary Adams	
1994	The Stoned Age	Officer Dean	
1997	Home Alone 3	Jack Pruitt	
1998	Music from Another Room	Hank	
2000	The Brainiacs.com	David Tyler	
2001	American Pie 2	Dad	
2002	Auto Focus	Clayton Moore	
2004	Raising Helen	Ed Portman	
2004	A Cinderella Story	Andy Ames	
2005	Shopgirl	Charley	
2006	Inside	Mark Smith	
2008	Julia	Johnny	
2008	The Coverup	Gregg Pratt	
2010	In My Sleep	Greg	
2010	One Wish	Jake Wylie	
2013	Paranoia	Tom Lungren	
2014	Young Americans	Roy	
2016	Hard Sell	Eddie	
2017	The Unattainable Story	Peter	
2017	Trust Fund	Grayson Donahue	
2018	Noah Wise	Harold Wise	Completed

=== Television ===
Year	Title	Role	Notes
1989	The Cosby Show	Steve	"Mrs. Huxtable Goes to Kindergarten"
1990	Murder in Paradise	Charlie Raski	TV film
1990	China Beach	Agent 29 / Ace	"Phoenix"
1990	Tales from the Crypt	James	"The Sacrifice"
1990	83 Hours 'til Dawn	Bobby Dankworth	TV film
1990	L.A. Law	James Campbell	"Smoke Gets in Your Thighs"
1990	Knots Landing	Alex Georgi	"The Lady or the Tiger?", "Asked to Rise", "A Merry Little Christmas"
1991	Sons and Daughters	Michael Morgan	"Dating Game"
1991	Jake and the Fatman	Jack Carpentier	"Second Time Around"
1991	The Heroes of Desert Storm	Capt. Shupp	TV film
1992	Empty Nest	Jerry Duvall	"Ex-Appeal"
1992	Lady Against the Odds	Steve Zimmerman	TV film
1992–1993	Murder, She Wrote	Paul Marlowe / Eugene Gillrich	"Sugar & Spice, Malice & Vice", "For Whom the Ball Tolls"
1993	HeartBeat	Steven Towers	TV film
1993	Camp Wilder	Max	"Love Stinks"
1995–1996	Almost Perfect	Mike Ryan	Main role
1996	Poltergeist: The Legacy	David Praeger	"The Signalman"
1996	Timepiece	David Parkin	TV film
1997	All Lies End in Murder	Rich Bernardi	TV film
1997–2001	Earth: Final Conflict	William Boone	Main role (season 1), recurring (season 5)
1998	Frasier	Steve Garrett	"Roz and the Schnoz"
1998	Rude Awakening	Ted	"Filling the Wrong Hole"
1998	Point Last Seen	Kevin Harrison	TV film
1999	Encore! Encore!	Ken	"Crime & Punishment"
1999	Smart House	Nick Cooper	TV film
1999	Touched by an Angel	Jordan Avery	"Til Death Do Us Part"
2000	My Mother, the Spy	Rabbi / Gary Sutton	TV film
2000	The Fearing Mind	Det. Sarno	"Sweet Meat"
2001	The Division	Dr. Charles Munson	"Hero"
2001	The Lot	Danny Matthews	"Danny Matthews Takes a Wife"
2002	CSI: Miami	Drake Hamilton	"Just One Kiss"
2003	Malcolm in the Middle	Vince	"Malcolm Holds His Tongue"
2003	Knee High P.I.	Pratt	TV film
2003	Miss Match	Dr. John	"Addicted to Love"
2003	Judging Amy	Larry Richards	"Rumspringa"
2004	Crossing Jordan	Mr. Darnell	"What Happens in Vegas Dies in Boston"
2005	Medical Investigation	Paul Maloney	"Tribe"
2005	Monk	Jack Bollinger	"Mr. Monk and Mrs. Monk"
2005	Threshold	Sen. Will Tollman	"The Order"
2005–2006	One Tree Hill	Larry Sawyer	Recurring role (season 3)
2006	In from the Night	Chet Hammond	TV film
2006	The New Adventures of Old Christine	Charles Ehrhardt	"Some of My Best Friends Are Portuguese"
2006	The Closer	Det. Hubbard	"Blue Blood"
2007	A Stranger's Heart	Doc Jackson	TV film
2007	The Unit	Col. Bazemore	"Paradise Lost"
2007	Hidden Palms	George Witter	"Pilot"
2007	The 1/2 Hour News Hour	Jack McCraney	Recurring role
2007	Ghost Whisperer	Bill Fordham	"Don't Try This at Home"
2007	Big Shots	Frank O'Connell	"The Good, the Bad, and the Really Ugly"
2007–2009	Greek	Mr. Chambers	"Liquid Courage", "Tailgate Expectations", "Agents for Change"
2008	Cashmere Mafia	Clayton	Guest role
2008	Eli Stone	Dr. Agon	"Heal the Pain"
2009	Ugly Betty	Dr. Mervin Farber	"Sisters on the Verge of a Nervous Breakdown"
2009	Life on Mars	Dr. Richard Olsen	"Revenge of the Broken Jaw"
2009	Dollhouse	Joe Hearn	"Stage Fright", "Man on the Street"
2009	Life	Howard Amis	"Initiative 38"
2009	Damages	Carter Wilcox	"Trust Me"
2009	Chasing a Dream	Leo Genovese	TV film
2010	CSI: NY	Dwight Bernard	"The Formula"
2010	Next Stop Murder	Sims	TV film
2011	The Craigslist Killer	David McAllister	TV film
2011	White Collar	Agent Roe	"Burke's Seven"
2011	The Cape	Henry Jerrod	"Dice"
2011	Happily Divorced	Richard	"A Date with Destiny"
2013	Royal Pains	Tom Seelig	"HankWatch"
2013	Blue Bloods	Agt. Richard Keller	"To Protect and Serve"
2013–2014	House of Cards	Michael Kern	"Chapter 1", "Chapter 2", "Chapter 26"
2014	Castle	Jamie Burman	"The Greater Good"
2014	Madam Secretary	Robert Cole	"Pilot"
2014	Person of Interest	Nick Dawson	"Prophets"
2015	Happyish	David	Recurring role
2015	The Good Wife	Brooks Volk	"Discovery"
2016	Unforgettable	Tom Noonan	"The Return of Eddie"
2016	Elementary	Michael Haas	"Who Is That Masked Man?"
2016	Quantico	Glenn Wyatt	"Care"
2017	The Blacklist	Chris Farnsworth	"The Forecaster (No. 163)"
2020	Bull	Peter Maybrook	"Look Back in Anger"
2021	Bonding	MJP	3 episodes
2021	Acapulco	Barry Rosenthal	"Uptown Girl"
