= Granite Flats =

2013–2015 American television series

- Written by: John Christian Plummer
- Directed by: Scott Swofford; Brian McNamara; Blair Treu
- Starring: Jonathan Morgan Heit; Annie Tedesco; Richard Gunn; Charlie Plummer; Malia Tyler; David Naughton; Peter Murnik; Ethan Ross Wills; Tom Wright
- Opening theme: "The End of the World" (television run); Setting Sun (BYUtv streams)
- Country of origin: United States
- Original language: English
- No. of seasons: 3
- No. of episodes: 24

Production
- Producers: Derek Marquis; Jeff T. Miller; Scott Swofford; Terri Pappas; Jared Shores
- Production locations: Salt Lake County and Utah County, Utah
- Running time: 60 minutes each episode

Original release
- Network: BYUtv
- Release: April 7, 2013 – April 4, 2015

Granite Flats is an American television series, the first original scripted drama series produced by BYUtv. The show is set in a small Colorado town in the early 1960s during the Cold War, and follows several of the town's citizens as mysterious and potentially dangerous circumstances arise. Season 1 launched on April 7, 2013. The cast was joined by actors Christopher Lloyd and Cary Elwes for its second season, which premiered April 6, 2014. Parker Posey and George Newbern joined the cast for season 3, premiered online April 4, 2015, before the TV season launch scheduled for October. It had an audience of approximately 500,000 households per episode.

On April 20, 2015 it was announced that Granite Flats would join Netflix; all three seasons launched on the streaming service on May 15, 2015.

On June 25, 2015, Granite Flats executive producer Scott Swofford announced the end of the series after three seasons, calling it a "huge success."

== Production ==
The show was produced in Salt Lake City, Utah, in a former high school converted into eight dedicated sets recreating early 1960s America. Because BYUtv is intended for a family audience that shares Church of Jesus Christ of Latter-day Saints values, there is no smoking and there is no adult or extramarital content. All alcohol consumption is portrayed in a distinctly negative light and none of the characters drink coffee.

=== Development ===
During 2010 and 2011, newly appointed BYUtv director of content, Scott Swofford, commissioned focus groups targeting TV viewers who were at least nominally religious, to see what they liked, disliked and wanted in TV. Swofford summarized the results as, "We want to be entertained. Then we'll stick around for the message." This led to the creation of the pilot for Granite Flats, which became BYUtv's first and flagship original scripted television drama series, and went on to significantly expand the channel's audience, eventually attracting about 500,000 viewers per episode, compared to the previous top-rated show, Love of Quilting, which typically drew under 10,000.

=== Financing and budget ===
According to Swofford, the show is funded and non-profit: "We're not ad-driven, so we're not looking at the Nielsens the next day and saying, 'Oh gosh, did we do okay?' We're saying 'Did it work? Is it happening? Is it reaching the audience we want?' ... It's a whole different metric, and it is weird to have the opportunity to play in this arena without having to obey some of those rules. It makes it possible to do independent work." Each show cost $800,000, about a third of the industry standard in Hollywood.

=== Series end ===
On June 25, 2015, Granite Flats Executive Producer and BYUtv Director of Content, Scott Swofford, announced the end of the series after three seasons, calling it a "huge success." According to Swofford, "We look forward to what is on the horizon in the form of additional scripted content at BYUtv and have chosen to concentrate resources on these ideas and forego producing a fourth season of Granite Flats."

== Cast ==
Cast and logo for season 1

=== Stars ===
- Jonathan Morgan Heit plays Arthur Milligan, the new kid in town, who quickly forms a friendship with Timmy Sanders and Madeline Andrews.
- Annie Tedesco (seasons 1 & 2) played Beth Milligan, a young mother who moves to Granite Flats with her son Arthur after the death of her husband. In season 2 she becomes the nurse over the special ward and becomes part of Project Madman. In between seasons 2 and 3 her character is killed in a suspicious car accident.
- Richard Gunn plays the chief of police John Sanders, a man who's serious about his job and doesn't give up easily to bring justice to Granite Flats.
- Charlie Plummer plays Timmy Sanders, the police chief's son who gets excited about solving mysteries.
- Malia Tyler plays Madeline Andrews, an intelligent girl of Korean descent, friend of Timmy and Arthur.
- Peter Murnik plays Hershel Jenkins, an army sergeant who gets accused of setting off a bomb inside the army base. After John Sanders proves his innocence, Jenkins is let go by the army. He is eventually made a deputy in Granite Flats.
- Ethan Ross Wills plays Wallace Jenkins. Wallace is originally the school bully, but a number of insecurities are shown inside him when his father gets arrested. He gets taken in by Regina and lives with her for a time. In season 3 Wallace moves back in with his father, develops his first crush, and joins Timmy, Madeline, and Arthur to solve mysteries.
- David Naughton plays Dr. Millard Whittison, the head of Granite Flats hospital and the CIA contact for Project Madman, part of Project MK Ultra.
- Tom Wright (supporting seasons 1 & 2, star season 3) plays FBI agent Ezekiel Scott. Originally he comes to Granite Flats searching for the Soviet satellite that crashed, but he is forced to return and lead FBI operatives in the search for possible Soviet spies. He works unofficially with John in the manhunt.

=== Supporting ===
- Scott Christopher plays Lt. Frank Quincy, an officer whose prolonged stay at the army hospital piques Beth's curiosity.
- Jessica Wright plays Regina Clark. Regina is a nurse at the hospital and is co-workers to Beth Milligan and Dr. Millard Whittison. She also acts as the surrogate mother for Wallace Jenkins. She has a strong faith and believes anyone can change but requires seeing some proof before making up her mind.
- Ivan Sergei plays Roy Milligan, father of Arthur and husband of Beth. His wife and son believe him to be dead, but he is actually undercover in Russia, possibly turned to the Russian side of the Cold War.
- Jim Turner plays Dr. Ronald Andrews, the father of Madeline Andrews and the lead doctor on Project Madman.
- Maia Guest plays Dr. Susan Andrews, the mother of Madeline Andrews and one of the doctors working on Project Madman.
- Taryn O'Neill plays June Sanders, wife to John and mother to Timmy.
- Mitchell Fink plays Pastor Todd, the pastor at Granite Flats Church of Christ and the leader of the weekday youth group.
- Brandon Molale played Major Slim Kirkpatrick. Slim was Regina's love interest and also the head of the military police. He was secretly a Soviet spy. He tried to get Hershel executed for blowing up the welding shop, which was blown up because of a gas leak caused by a piece of Soviet satellite debris. The FBI and John eventually begin to suspect Slim of being a spy, so Slim tried to get Whittison to hand him the info on Project Madman. When Whittison refused Slim tried to shoot it out with Police Chief John Sanders and lost.

=== Guest stars ===
- Christopher Lloyd plays Professor Stanfield Hargraves, a smart and teasing English teacher with a specialty in Shakespeare.
- Cary Elwes plays Hugh Ashmead, a CIA counter-intelligence officer who threatens to take over Project Madman for his own purposes. In real life, the name "Ashmead" was the cover name for James Angleton who headed the CIA's counterintelligence program during the era the show is set.
- George Newbern plays Scottie Andrews, a civil-liberties attorney from New York City who is an uncle to Madeline Andrews.
- Parker Posey plays Alice White, the aunt of Arthur Milligan who has just been released from prison after spending a decade there for murder. She has visions that sometimes come true.

== Episodes ==
=== Season One (2013) ===
Episode No.	Title	Date First Aired	Description
1	Pilot	April 7, 2013	Arthur Milligan and his mother, Beth, move to Granite Flats, Colorado, where they hope to find peace and quiet in the midst of the Cold War. An explosion rocks the local army base.
2	Empty Box	April 7, 2013	The base explosion causes a Red Scare, and Arthur and his new friends begin investigating those who may have been involved.
3	A Secret to the Heart Nearest	April 15, 2013	Arthur and his friends Tim and Madeline look deeper into the town's mysteries.
4	Talking	April 22, 2013	Beth tries to connect with her son, Arthur, who has built a metal detector with his friends to help them investigate.
5	Bonds	April 29, 2013	Friendships are tested after a failed class project, Beth investigates her patient's strange behavior and Police Chief Sanders struggles to balance his work with family life.
6	Reassembly	May 6, 2013	Arthur and his friends look for more mysteries to solve. John, the police chief, works with the FBI.
7	The Wrong Man	May 13, 2013	Frank asks for Beth's help to prove his sanity. Hershel receives visitors while incarcerated.
8	Something Dangerous	May 20, 2013	The children of the town prepare for the science fair. John works to free an innocent man. Arthur, Timmy and Madeline work to form an official detective agency and encounter a dangerous mystery.

=== Season Two (2014) ===
Episode No.	Title	Date First Aired	Description
1	Children of Darkness, Children of Light	6 April 2014	Chief Sanders and Agent Scott investigate citizens whose loyalties are questionable, the young detectives are still curious about the coded message they found, and at the hospital, experiments reveal a patient's past.
2	Boundaries	13 April 2014	The three sleuths argue about getting involved with the FBI investigation. Beth is concerned about Frank and the hospital experiments. Wallace is caught in the middle when Regina and Hershel argue about what's best for him.
3	From Whose Bourn No Traveler Returns	20 April 2014	Timmy, Arthur, and Madeline make a dangerous discovery, right under the nose of the FBI. While they investigate, Granite Flats is in an uproar - chaos breaks out at the hospital and Chief Sanders races to apprehend a suspect.
4	Also Be the Consolation	27 April 2014	Everyone tries to deal with the loss of a friend, and sorting it out reveals vulnerabilities: Regina keeps reflecting on better days, John can't seem to live with himself, and even Hershel struggles to deal with the tragedy.
5	Put Away Childish Things	4 May 2014	The kids' new English teacher (Christopher Lloyd) has a way of making Hamlet applicable to life in Granite Flats. Some citizens are unsettled when a CIA agent arrives (Cary Elwes). And Arthur's detective work reaches a new level.
6	The Stories We Tell......	11 May 2014	Ashmead stirs up confusion and danger when he meddles in the Andrews' personal and professional lives, and Chief Sanders recruits a new deputy with somewhat surprising results.
7	Cor Unum, Corambis	18 May 2014	Arthur continues his investigation alone and finds a resonant soul in Whittison. Hargraves counsels Timmy on romance. And Hershel becomes the bait in a dangerous trap.
8	Project Madman	25 May 2014	In the dramatic season finale, crisis is the watchword. Beth, Whittison, and the Andrews turn the tables on Ashmead. Timmy and Madeline find what everyone has been pursuing. And Professor Hargraves may not be what he seems.

=== Season Three (2015) ===
- BYUtv announced on July 16, 2014, that Granite Flats will return for its third season in April 2015.
- Season Three began filming on Monday, September 22, 2014.
- Granite Flats, Season Three, was launched with all 8 episodes available online at graniteflats.com and byutv.org Saturday, April 4, 2015.
- All three seasons debuted on Netflix on May 15, 2015.
- The season 3 episodes began airing on BYUtv in October 2015 and finished in December.

Episode No.	Title	Date First Aired	Description
1	Our Rendezvous Is Fitly Appointed	4 April 2015	The events at the end of season 2 cause a quick change of pace in season 3. Beth dies in a car accident leading to Arthur being placed in the custody of his aunt, Alice White (Parker Posey). Madeline's parents, Ronald and Susan Andrews, learn the Project Madman files were stolen by Timmy and Madeline and forbid Timmy and Madeline from seeing each other, outside of school. Madeline and Timmy conspire with Professor Hargraves on how to meet with each other. Susan secretly contacts Ronald's brother Scottie (George Newbern) and asks him to come help the family legally with Madeline. Hershel gets a court order placing Wallace back in his custody, and the FBI and CIA try to investigate who The Plumber is. In Russia, Roy learns of his wife's death and deserts his assignment to try and head home.
2	The Converging Objects of the Universe Perpetually Flow	4 April 2015	The FBI and CIA manage to find a person who might know information on whom The Plumber truly is. Arthur secretly spies on Timmy and Madeline and learns they are meeting at Professor Hargraves. John continues to investigate what he believes is the murder of Beth. Timmy learns that John was the one who actually killed Slim. Doctor Whittison continues to secretly train Arthur in CIA techniques. Arthur gets a message that his father is returning, but thinks it is something more. Ronald seeks additional information on his brother's supposed rehabilitation. Scottie invites the Andrews' to attend church with him.
3	Mortised in Granite	4 April 2015	Roy kidnaps Frank to find out what the relationship was between him and his wife. Scottie spends the afternoon with Madeline at the Sanders' home and tries to convince June that the punishment between Timmy and Madeline should be lifted. Millard Whittison watches over Arthur and Alice to make sure they aren't attacked by the missing Lt. Quincy. The FBI searches the town for the missing Lt. Quincy, while the Andrews fear what he could reveal about them and why he returned to Granite Flats. Lt. Quincy recovers from his interrogation at the school and contacts the police. He is returned to the hospital. Roy agrees to go back undercover after seeing his son from a distance, but before he can do so a gun is pointed at his head at his hiding place.
4	Form and Union Plan	4 April 2015	Whittison informs Frank of the upcoming interrogation by the Andrews'. He provides him with a serum that will prevent him from falling under mind control and plants a red herring that will allow Roy to escape. The Sanders' meet with the Andrews' and both sides agree to let their kids start seeing each other again. Wallace seeks counsel on girls from Timmy and ends up getting the shock of his young life.
5	The Threads That Were Spun Are Gathered	4 April 2015	Alice has a vision where she sees Doctor Whittison in danger. She decides to admit to him that she has visions when she has epilepsy attacks at their upcoming dinner. The FBI is able to arrest the Avon Lady (Finola Hughes) and bring her in for questioning. The Andrews' have Professor Hargraves over for dinner as a thanks for tutoring Madeline. Arthur receives Frank's message about investigating his mother's death and agrees to work with Timmy and Madeline, but only if Wallace joins them. Hershel attempts to avoid his old wife Jenny, but she surprises him at the police station with one of his favorite meals.
6	Some Intricate Purpose	4 April 2015	The FBI begins investigating Professor Hargraves after learning that he has a long history of communist sympathy and that he has a Jackie Kennedy mask in his closet. John also recommends they begin investigating Scottie after his sudden reappearance in Granite Flats. Jenny Jenkins is invited by Regina and the Pastor to lunch at her place where she asks Hershel for a divorce, but she also reveals she wants to take Wallace to France with her. Arthur finds a postcard that could contain a clue to Frank's lost memories. After overhearing a conversation where Madeline declares she will be leaving the house at age 18 and never returning, Susan makes a decision that could reunite her with Madeline or drive them further apart.
7	The Terrible Doubt of Appearances	4 April 2015	Professor Hargraves gets himself arrested intentionally to try and prove his innocence. Madeline overhears that her mother is looking to quit Project Madman and decides to ask her to help find the missing days Frank Quincy had. John confronts Scottie and learns that he is a member of the CIA. Frank agrees to get hypnotized to find his missing memories and reveals a shocking spy. Wallace asks Regina if anything happened between his mother and father, and she says he should ask Hershel about it.
8	All Truths Wait in All Things	4 April 2015	Timmy comes up with a plan to reveal the KGB agent without anyone dying. The FBI, CIA, Professor Hargraves, and others are used in the plot. The identity of The Plumber is revealed, and we learn Beth was really murdered. Both Andrews resign from Project Madman. Susan becomes the head of the hospital, and Ronald becomes a substitute teacher for Professor Hargraves. Frank becomes friends with Alice. Hershel and Regina become engaged as do Jean Baptiste and Jenny Jenkins. A Christmas party is held for everyone, but while the partying is going on The Plumber is broken out of prison by the KGB to end the season.

== See also ==
- Project MKUltra Real-life, illegal CIA program conducted on unsuspecting American citizens, including hallucinogenic drug experiments on them without their consent
