= Final Shot: The Hank Gathers Story =

- VHS cover
- Genre: Biography; Drama; Sport
- Written by: Fred Johnson
- Screenplay by: Fred Johnson; Don Enright; Ed Fields
- Story by: Fred Johnson
- Directed by: Charles Braverman
- Starring: Victor Love; Duane Davis; George Kennedy; Nell Carter; Sam Hennings
- Music by: Stanley Clarke
- Country of origin: United States
- Original language: English

Production
- Executive producer: Russell Vreeland
- Producers: Don Enright; Les Alexander; James P. McGillen
- Production locations: Los Angeles; Philadelphia, Pennsylvania; Santa Monica, California
- Cinematography: Stephen Blake
- Running time: 92 minutes
- Production companies: McGillen Entertainment; Alexander, Enright & Associates; Tribune Entertainment
- Budget: $3 million

Original release
- Network: First-run syndication
- Release: March 29, 1992

Final Shot: The Hank Gathers Story is an American 1992 sports drama biography television film about the life of Loyola Marymount basketball player Eric "Hank" Gathers, written for Tribune Entertainment by Fred Johnson, Don Enright and Ed Fields, and directed by Charles Braverman.

== Synopsis ==
This film follows the life of basketball legend Eric "Hank" Gathers, from his growing up in the ghettos of Philadelphia to his freshman year at USC through his brief career playing basketball for Loyola Marymount University, where he collapsed during a game and died of a heart ailment.

== Partial cast ==
- Victor Love as Hank Gathers
- Duane Davis as Bo Kimble
- George Kennedy as Father Dave
- Nell Carter as Lucille Gathers
- Sam Hennings as Coach Spencer
- Reynaldo Rey as Red
- Whitman Mayo as Nick
- Ed Arnold as Himself
- Bart Braverman as Tom Talmadge
- Dick Baker as Referee
- John Mahon as Paul Westhead
- Ken Foree as First USC Coach
- Milt Kogan as Doctor
- Baldwin C. Sykes as Specs
- Michael D. Hall as Heat Gates
- Cory Curtis as Young Heat Gates
- De'Andre Alfred as Noo-Noo Gathers
- Donny B. Lord as Young Hank Gathers
- Michole White as Taffy
- David Netter as Aaron

== Production ==
Casting began in late 1991, with a television debut slated for March 1992. The project was filmed in North Philadelphia, Pennsylvania; as well as in Santa Monica and Los Angeles, California.

== Reception ==
Entertainment Weekly wrote that the film "does a decent job of showing us the person inside the uniform," but felt that the film is overall "too sketchily told to be truly satisfying."

Dallas Morning News felt that the film went beyond disappointing to become "an insult -- not for what it focuses on, but for what it leaves out." The reviewer felt that the film fell "in line with many TV projects based on real-life people by reducing its subject to sterotypes."

The Philadelphia Inquirer wrote that film suffered in its dwelling less on the formative events of Gathers' life to concentrate too much upon his basketball career.

Conversely, San Diego Union-Tribune felt the film was a fitting tribute to Hank Gathers' memory.

Variety wrote that while some of the scenes were awkward, the film "sets a fine example of what a youth under pressure in North Philly can accomplish." They wrote that it is the growing relation of Hank Gathers with his college teammate Bo Kimble as friends and players that holds the viewer's interest, while making note that Gathers' off-court life remains "shadowy and vague".

== See also ==
- List of basketball films
