= Detention of the Dead =

- Theatrical release poster
- Directed by: Alex Craig Mann
- Screenplay by: Rob Rinow; Alex Craig Mann
- Based on: Detention of the Dead by Rob Rinow
- Produced by: Michael Manasseri; Brooke P. Anderson
- Starring: Jacob Zachar; Alexa Nikolas; Christa B. Allen; Jayson Blair; Justin Chon; Max Adler
- Cinematography: Noah Rosenthal
- Music by: Cody Westheimer
- Production company: Gala Films
- Distributed by: Anchor Bay Films
- Release dates: April 27, 2012 (Newport Beach Film Festival); June 28, 2013 (United States; limited)
- Running time: 87 minutes
- Country: United States
- Language: English

Detention of the Dead is a 2012 American zombie comedy film written and directed by Alex Craig Mann, based on the Rob Rinow stage play of the same name. Filming began in spring 2011. It had a small theatrical release in Los Angeles on June 28, 2013, and was released on DVD on July 23, 2013.

== Plot ==
High school student Eddie (Jacob Zachar) reports to after-school detention at Lincoln High School. Upon arrival, Eddie sees a few familiar faces: Janet (Christa B. Allen), a cheerleader whom he has a crush on; Brad (Jayson Blair), a jock and high-school football player who bullies Ed and plans to join the ROTC; Jimmy (Max Adler), another football player/jock who also bullies Eddie and is good friends with Brad; Ash (Justin Chon), a happy-go-lucky stoner; and Eddie's best friend Willow (Alexa Nikolas), a goth who shares with him a love for zombie movies.

Ash attempts to sell drugs to Mark (Joseph Porter), a quiet student in detention. Realizing Mark is unwell, Ash alerts Mrs. Rumblethorp (Michele Messmer). She approaches Mark, who becomes aggressive and bites her despite Eddie's warning not to approach him, forcing the group to evacuate the detention room.

In the school corridors, they discover the school is overrun by a zombie outbreak that killed all other students. They barricade themselves in the school library. Mrs. Rumblethorp eventually dies and reanimates. The group restrain her as Ash decapitates her with a paper cutter. Brad is bitten in the chaos, but keeps it hidden from the group. While searching the library for available information on zombies, Jimmy is bitten by the zombified librarian, whom Brad kills. Eddie and Willow argue that they must kill Jimmy before he becomes a zombie, but Brad remains confident that his friend can survive his bite. However, Jimmy accepts his fate and jumps out a window, getting eaten by a group of zombies.

As the group panic, Ash convinces everyone to smoke weed to calm their nerves. While doing so, the group bond, learning more about each other, challenging their original high-school stereotypes, which they list openly: the nerd (Eddie), the social outcast and goth (Willow), the popular, self-involved cheerleader (Janet), the jock (Brad) and the stoner (Ash). Eddie reveals a gun he kept in his bag, which he was planning on using to commit suicide after not being accepted into Harvard University.

Another attack, which they barely fend off, make them realize the barricades will not hold. While Eddie and Janet stay behind, Brad, Willow and Ash go through the vents. Ash is attacked and eaten by zombified rats. The vent breaks, dumping Willow and Brad in the school halls. Arming themselves with Ash's severed legs, the duo begin to fight their way back to the library. Meanwhile, Janet convinces Eddie to take her virginity, but the pair are interrupted by Willow and Brad.

Inside the library, Willow is hurt when she realizes Eddie's intentions with Janet. The barricades of the door begin to weaken, before Brad eventually succumbs to his infection and attacks Janet, who manages to knock him out of a window nearby. Eddie formulates a plan to escape, building a makeshift cart out of materials in the library.

The survivors fight through the school corridors and make it to the school gym. While climbing a ladder up to the roof, Janet is bitten on the leg. She pleads with Willow to shoot her. However, zombies begin to climb the ladder, forcing Willow to shoot to fend them off. The zombified Brad attacks the group, and Janet sacrifices herself by pushing herself and Brad off.

Eddie and Willow is narrowly saved by military units, who descend on the school and quickly kill the zombies. As Eddie and Willow leave the school, they share their first kiss, only for a zombified Janet to tackle Eddie to the ground before the soldiers save him, allowing him and Willow to return home safe.

== Cast ==
- Jacob Zachar as Eddie
- Alexa Nikolas as Willow
- Christa B. Allen as Janet
- Jayson Blair as Brad
- Justin Chon as Ash
- Max Adler as Jimmy
- Joseph Porter as Mark
- Joey Paul Gowdy as Zombified Student
- Michele Messmer as Mrs. Rumblethorp
- Brian J Schaaf as Zombie Shop Teacher
- Willy Zhang as Stand In

== Critical reception ==
On the review aggregator website Rotten Tomatoes, 50% of eight critics' reviews are positive.

The Hollywood Reporter wrote, "With makeup and gore effects that could be bested by moderately gifted fanboys at a well equipped high school, Detention never manages a single scare — a failing that would be forgivable if only it were making us laugh." Robert Abele of the Los Angeles Times wrote, "Six-year-olds at recess could come up with a wittier script and more charming performances, since they probably wouldn’t be hampered by lame pop culture references, laziness disguised as parody, and gore disguised as slapstick." Alex Craig Mann of Dread Central was more positive, giving it a score of 3/5 and saying it "does entertain and its heart is without question in the right place. It hits way more than it misses, and there are some truly shining moments strewn throughout the flick to keep even the hungriest of gorehounds satisfied."
