= Gerald N. Lund =

American novelist (born 1939)

Second Quorum of the Seventy
- April 6, 2002 – October 4, 2008
- Called by: Gordon B. Hinckley
- End reason: Honorably released

Personal details
- Born: Gerald Niels Lund; September 12, 1939 (age 86); Fountain Green, Utah, U.S.

Gerald Niels Lund (born September 12, 1939) was a general authority of the Church of Jesus Christ of Latter-day Saints (LDS Church) from 2002 to 2008. Lund was released as a general authority and member of the church's Second Quorum of the Seventy on October 4, 2008.

== About ==
Lund is also a popular Latter-day Saint fiction writer, having written The Work and the Glory series as well as the Kingdom and the Crown series, among other books. He has also written several theological non-fiction works for Latter-day Saints, including, Hearing the Voice of the Lord: Principles and Patterns of Personal Revelation (2008) and The Coming of the Lord (reprint 2005). Lund and his wife, Lynn, are the parents of seven children. Lund has also written poems that his wife has set to music.

Before becoming a general authority, he worked in the LDS Church's educational system. He also served in the church as a stake president, bishop and branch president at the Missionary Training Center in Provo, Utah. Among other assignments during his tenure as a general authority, he lived in Solihull, England for 3 years while serving in an area presidency.

== Bibliography ==
All works published by Deseret Book Company.

=== Fiction ===
Title	Date	ISBN	Notes
One in Thine Hand	January 1982	0-87747-894-5	
The Alliance	September 1983	0-87747-982-8	
Leverage Point	November 1985	0-87579-017-8	with Roger Hendrix
The Freedom Factor	September 1987	0-87579-098-4	
Fire of the Covenant	January 1999	1-57008-685-0	

==== The Work and the Glory (1990–1998) ====
The Work and the Glory historical fiction series based on, and inspired by, the life and death of Joseph Smith and the founding of the LDS Church. The novels were adapted as film series by the same name.

No.	Title	Date	ISBN
1	Pillar of Light	September 1990	0-88494-770-X
2	Like a Fire is Burning	October 1991	0-88494-801-3
3	Truth Will Prevail	September 1992	0-88494-853-6
4	Thy Gold to Refine	October 1993	0-88494-893-5
5	A Season of Joy	October 1994	0-88494-960-5
6	Praise to the Man	November 1995	0-88494-999-0
7	No Unhallowed Hand	November 1996	1-57008-277-4
8	So Great a Cause	October 1997	1-57008-358-4
9	All Is Well	October 1998	1-57008-563-3

==== The Kingdom and the Crown (2000–2002) ====
The Kingdom and the Crown historical fiction series based on the ministry of Jesus, as told from a Latter-day Saint perspective.

No.	Title	Date	ISBN
1	Fishers of Men	October 2000	1-57345-820-1
2	Come Unto Me	October 2001	1-57008-714-8
3	Behold the Man	October 2002	1-57008-853-5

==== San Juan Pioneers (2009–2016) ====
San Juan Pioneers historical fiction series based on, and inspired by, the San Juan Expedition.

No.	Title	Date	ISBN
1	The Undaunted	August 17, 2009	978-1-60641-191-9
2	Only the Brave	December 8, 2014	978-1-62972-026-5
3	To Soar with Eagles	May 31, 2016	978-1-62972-201-6

==== The Guardian (2012–13) ====
The Guardian is a two-volume thriller set during World War II.

No.	Title	Date	ISBN
1	The Guardian	November 26, 2012	978-1-60907-246-9
2	To Run with the Swift	November 4, 2013	978-1-60907-796-9

==== Fire and Steel (2014–2019) ====
Fire and Steel historical series based on events before and during World War II. Reports and diaries from LDS Church missionaries were inspiration for the characters and settings.

No.	Title	Date	ISBN
1	A Generation Rising	November 28, 2014	978-1-60907-992-5
2	The Storm Descends	November 2, 2015	978-1-62972-106-4
3	The Shadow Falls	November 7, 2016	978-1-62972-260-3
4	The Proud Shall Stumble	May 15, 2017	978-1-62972-316-7
5	Out of the Smoke	October 29, 2018	978-1-62972-479-9
6	Into the Flames	September 2, 2019	978-1-62972-620-5

=== Non-fiction ===
Incomplete list of non-fiction releases.

Title	Date	ISBN	Notes
Jesus Christ, Key to the Plan of Salvation	January 1998	0-87579-421-1	
The Selected Writings of Gerald N. Lund	August 1999	1-57345-549-0	Gospel Scholar Series, Volume 1
In Tune: The Role of the Spirit in Teaching and Learning	December 30, 2013	978-1-60907-858-4	
Lieutenant Terry's Christmas Fudge	September 25, 2017	978-1-62972-367-9	
Why Isn't God Answering Me?	August 20, 2018	978-1-62972-449-2	

==== Divine Guidance (2007–2012) ====
Individual volumes were bundled into a series in 2013. The series was also marketed as Divine Signatures.

No.	Title	Date	ISBN
1	Divine Signatures	November 17, 2010	978-1-60641-927-4
2	Hearing the Voice of the Lord	November 1, 2007	978-1-59038-893-8
3	Look Up My Soul	February 21, 2012	978-1-62972-260-3

== Filmography ==
Year	Title	Role	Writer	Notes
2004	The Work and the Glory		Yes	Base on novel The Pillar of Light (1990)
2005	The Work and the Glory: American Zion		Yes	Based on novel Like a Fire is Burning (1991)
2006	The Work and the Glory III: A House Divided		Yes	Based on novel Truth Will Prevail (1992)
2016	Hole in the Rock Expedition	Self / Host	No	Video documentary; References The Undaunted (2009) and Only the Brave (2014)
