= Kieren van den Blink =

American actress

- Born: Silver Spring, Maryland
- Education: Barnard College

Kieren van den Blink (born Silver Spring, Maryland) is an American actress, director, writer and producer, best known as the voice for Rogue in the X-Men television series Wolverine and the X-Men.

== Early life and education ==
Van den Blink went to The Peddie School in New Jersey, and later graduated from Barnard College in 1995.

== Filmography ==
- Drown Soda (1997), Alicia – Short movie
- Point Last Seen (1998), Young Rachel – TV movie
- Anywhere but Here (1999), Girl on T.V.
- The Four of Us (2001), Jamie – Short movie
- Without a Trace (2004), Erica Clemens – TV series, episode "Shadows"
- Numb3rs (2005), Nikki – TV series, episode "Vector"
- Fancy (2005), Amanda – Short movie
- Celebrity Deathmatch (2007), Lindsay Lohan (voice) – TV Series, episode "Where's Lohan?"
- Tyranny (2007), Isabelle Lorenz – also writer and associate producer
- Wolverine and the X-Men (2008–2009), Rogue (voice) – TV series, 8 episodes
