= One Wish (film) =

- Directed by: Felix Limardo
- Written by: Ron Willens
- Starring: Bella Thorne; Kevin Kilner; Christa B. Allen; Symba Smith; Kelsey Weber
- Cinematography: Euripides Núñez
- Distributed by: Trillianent
- Release date: November 26, 2010
- Running time: 104 minutes
- Country: United States
- Language: English
- Budget: $2,500,000

One Wish is a 2010 American drama film directed by Felix Limardo and written by Ron Willens. It was filmed in Ventura, California. It stars Bella Thorne, Kevin Kilner, Christa B. Allen, Symba Smith and Kelsey Weber. The film was released on November 26, 2010.

== Synopsis ==
Jake Wylie (Kevin Kilner) is a happily married father of Molly (Christa B. Allen), who is a dance champion preparing for the most important dance tournament of her life. One day, he sees a three-year-old girl about to be hit by an oncoming automobile and does the heroic thing, quickly moving to save her life. Because of his good actions, The Messenger (Bella Thorne), an angel, grants him one wish. Jake has a big decision to make because whatever he wishes for will have a large impact on the lives of his family.

== Cast ==
- Bella Thorne as The Messenger (Angel)
- Kevin Kilner as Jake Wylie
- Christa B. Allen as Molly Wylie
- Symba Smith as Marti Wylie
- Kelsey Weber as Sara Wylie
- Jasmine Lowe as Katrina
- Ali Fussell as Alana
- Colleen Irene Boag as Patricia
- Albert Malafronte as Father Carl Stokes
