= Red Dawn (American Horror Story) =

- American Horror Story episode
- Episode no.: Season 9 Episode 5
- Directed by: Gwyneth Horder-Payton
- Written by: Dan Dworkin
- Production code: 9ATS05
- Original air date: October 16, 2019
- Running time: 39 minutes

Guest appearances
- DeRon Horton as Ray Powell; Lou Taylor Pucci as Jonas Shevoore; Tim Russ as David Chambers; Richard Gunn as Chief Deputy

Episode chronology
← Previous "True Killers"	Next → "Episode 100"
- American Horror Story: 1984

"Red Dawn" is the fifth episode of the ninth season of the anthology television series American Horror Story. It aired on October 16, 2019, on the cable network FX. The episode was written by Dan Dworkin, and directed by Gwyneth Horder-Payton.

== Plot ==
=== 1980 ===
Donna, staking out his apartment complex, sees her father and a woman enter the building. Donna breaks inside and is shocked to find the woman tied up and disembowelled. Donna tries to help the woman but her father enters the bedroom, carrying a knife. He claims that he's always had darkness inside him. Donna promises that she can help him, but he commits suicide by stabbing himself in the neck.

=== 1984 ===
Richard Ramirez explains to a bewildered Donna that Satan resurrected him. Her father's ghost appears and encourages Donna to embrace the darkness inside her.

Xavier lights a stick on fire and threatens to burn the camp to the ground. Margaret knocks him out and the group retreats to a cabin. Margaret suggests that they take a boat to reach campers at the other side of the lake and Montana proposes that Chet accompany her. Alone with Brooke, Montana prepares to kill her, but Brooke leaves when she sees Ray through a window. In the middle of the lake, Margaret strikes Chet with an oar, ties an anchor to his ankle, slices his ear off, and pushes him into the water.

Brooke and Ray run to the mess hall. Brooke tells Ray about her past and the two end up having sex. Donna admits to Montana and Xavier that she released Mr. Jingles. Xavier attacks Donna and chases her out of the cabin. Brooke confides to Ray that he took her virginity. She then finds Ray's head in the refrigerator and runs back to Montana. Montana strikes her in the head and explains that she is avenging her brother's death.

Richter finds Margaret in the archery arena and grabs her by the throat. Xavier appears and shoots several arrows into Richter's chest. Xavier tends to Margaret and she suddenly attacks and kills him. Ramirez appears to a dying Richter and asks if he accepts Satan as his master. Richter accepts.

Brooke and Montana brawl until dawn when the campers pull up in a school bus and witness Brooke stabbing Montana to death. The police are called and Brooke is wrongfully arrested for the murders of the past night. Ramirez and Richter steal a cop car and the two speed away to Los Angeles. After Montana kills a policeman, she, Ray, and the hitchhiker reminisce about their ghosts being trapped on the camp property.

== Reception ==
"Red Dawn" was watched by 1.09 million people during its original broadcast, and gained a 0.5 ratings share among adults aged 18–49.

The episode received largely positive reviews. On the review aggregator Rotten Tomatoes, "Red Dawn" holds an 89% approval rating, based on 18 reviews with an average rating of 8.25/10. The critical consensus reads: "The mystery of Camp Redwood comes to a head in the wicked and gory "Red Dawn."

Ron Hogan of Den of Geek gave the episode a 4/5, saying, "American Horror Story devolves into mostly people running around with weapons, screaming at one another and trying to kill one another, yet at no time does it feel difficult to follow. Camp Redwood has a physical presence, and that helps make the action feel cohesive." He added, "Given the presence of multiple ghosts on the property, and the “next week on” sneak preview, Camp Redwood isn't quite done yet, even if Brooke seems done. Four episodes is a lot of time in which to spin off a second story, particularly with established characters. What they do with that time remains to be seen; whatever it might be, I have no doubt it'll be wildly entertaining and lots of people will die as a result." He also praised Ross and Lourd's performances, commenting that "Angelica Ross again does a wonderful job in her dramatic scenes, both confronting her father and confronting the truth about herself via Richard Ramirez's magical resurrection. Billy Lourd, as per usual, is a real treat as Montana."

Kat Rosenfield of Entertainment Weekly gave the episode a B+ rating. She enjoyed the fight between Brooke and Montana, especially the death scene of Lourd's character. She also appreciated the origin story for Ross' Donna Chambers, commenting that "This certainly explains Donna's fascination with killers". Even though she criticized Ray and his motive, she had a positive opinion about his and Brooke's "intimate moment", and the twist at the end of it. She also praised the new dynamics and relationship between Ramirez and Jingles, comparing their last scene to Thelma and Louise. Overall, Rosenfield really enjoyed the episode as she concluded her review by "With a satisfying cap like that, American Horror Story could've ended its ninth season right here."

Variety's Andrea Reiher gave a positive review, and said "American Horror Story is nothing if not full of twists, and with four episodes left, there are surely a lot more details to come that will turn this story on its head."
