= The Wrong Girl (film) =

- Genre: Thriller
- Written by: Karen Krenis
- Directed by: David Jackson
- Starring: Barbara Mandrell; Jonathan Scarfe; Zoe McLellan
- Music by: Frédéric Talgorn
- Country of origin: United States
- Original language: English

Production
- Executive producer: Bari Carrelli
- Producer: Clara George
- Cinematography: Denis Maloney
- Editor: Adam Wolfe
- Running time: 90 minutes
- Production company: NBC Studios

Original release
- Network: NBC
- Release: January 4, 1999

The Wrong Girl is a 1999 television film directed by David Jackson. It stars Barbara Mandrell, Jonathan Scarfe and Zoe McLellan. The film debuted on NBC on January 4, 1999.

== Premise ==
Steve Fisher (Jonathan Scarfe), a 21-year-old man who dropped out of college after making numerous wrong choices due to excessive partying, brings home his new girlfriend, Kelly Garner (Zoe McLellan). However, Steve's overprotective mother, Angela (Barbara Mandrell), is sure that something isn't right about her, which starts a fight with her son. Soon after, everything takes a deadly turn for the worse.

== Cast ==
- Barbara Mandrell as Angela Fisher
- Jonathan Scarfe as Steve Fisher
- Zoe McLellan as Kelly Garner
- Barry Flatman as Jim Fisher
- Joel Keller as Brian Fisher
- Charlotte Sullivan as Bridget Fisher
- Stacie Mistysyn as Missy
- Philip Akin as Police Detective Jacobs
