= Jenna Mattison =

American actress

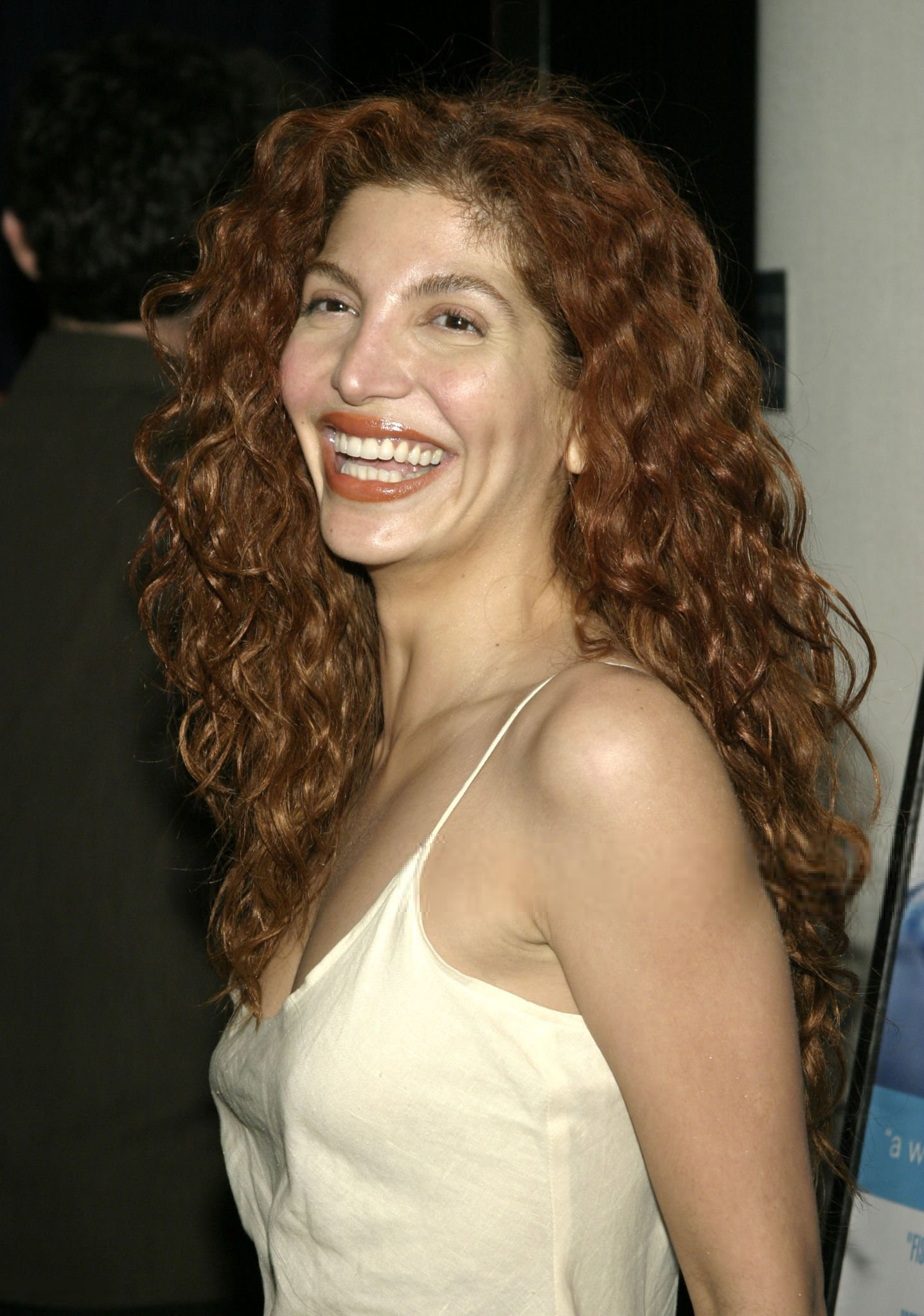
- Born: Jenna Mattison Mirza; India
- Occupations: Actress; screenwriter; producer
- Years active: 1995–present
- Notable work: Fish Without a Bicycle; The Sound
- Spouse: Richard Gunn (m. 2013)

Jenna Mattison, born Jenna Mattison Mirza is an American actress, screenwriter, producer, and director.

== Early life ==
Mattison was born in India, with her family moving to Chicago when she was 7 years old. From an early age, she became self conscious about her ethnicity, growing up in a mostly white neighborhood. She cited her name as one of the reasons she struggled to land acting roles in her early career, and opted to change her stage name to Jenna Mattison.

== Early career ==
Mattison moved to Hollywood in the late 90's, and would her dye her hair while avoiding any sort of natural tan in order to look white-passing. Some of Mattison's early roles included bit parts in Married... with Children, Party of Five and Melrose Place.

While working at The Laugh Factory as a cocktail waitress, Mattison began working on a screenplay, which she viewed catharsis while dealing with an unhappy relationship at the time. After a chance encounter with a Hollywood producer, Mattison's script was greenlit, and the romantic comedy Fish Without a Bicycle was released and published as her first independent film, with Mattison as the lead writer, co-producer, and star of the film. Fish Without a Bicycle premiered at the 2003 Cannes Film Festival. Mattison also wrote and produced the 2012 crime drama For the Love of Money, inspired by the real-life story of an Israeli gangster.

== Career ==
Mattison made her directorial debut with the psychological horror film, The Sound, released by MGM Orion and Samuel Goldwyn in 2017. Critics noted lead Rose McGowan's performance, as well as Mattison's focus on atmospheric direction.

In 2021, Mattison was attached as a screenwriter for a film adaptation of Sophie Kinsella's novel Remember Me?

In 2022, Mattison was hired to adapt a New York Times Bestselling novel by James Patterson. In 2024, she adapted Dying to Be Me, New York Times Bestselling memoir by Anita Moorjani, for the screen. In 2025, she adapted Decorum at the Deathbed, a novella by Bird Box author Josh Malerman.

== Filmography ==
=== Actress ===
Year	Title	Role
1995	Married... with Children	Woman In Red
1997	The Single Guy	Superwoman
2000	Party of Five	Jennifer
2001	The Fighting Fitzgeralds	Winnie (pilot)
2001	Alex in Wonder	Summer
2003	Fish Without a Bicycle	Julianna Mercer
2005	The Third Wish	Maggie Malone
2006	Naked Run	Mrs. Liverton
2007	Death Walks the Streets	Annie
2008	365 Days	Jane

=== Producer ===
Year	Title	Role
2003	Fish Without a Bicycle	Co-Producer
2005	The Third Wish	Producer
2008	365 Days	Executive Producer
2011	For The Love of Money	Producer
2017	The Sound	Producer

=== Writer ===
Year	Title
2003	Fish Without a Bicycle
2005	The Third Wish
2011	For the Love of Money
2017	The Sound

=== Director ===
Year	Title
2017	The Sound

== Personal life ==
Mattison married actor Richard Gunn in 2013. The two currently live in Los Angeles, California.
