= Seasons of the Heart (1993 film) =

- Directed by: T.C. Christensen
- Written by: Deborah Hofstedt
- Produced by: Don A. Judd; Scott Swofford
- Starring: Leigh Lombardi; Sam Hennings; Claude Akins; Logan Hall; Jay Dee Bateman
- Cinematography: T.C. Christensen
- Edited by: Stephen L. Johnson; Lori Peterson
- Music by: Marvin Hamlisch; Kem Kraft
- Distributed by: Feature Films for Families
- Release date: 1993
- Running time: 99 minutes
- Country: United States
- Language: English

Seasons of the Heart is a 1993 American Christian drama film starring Leigh Lombardi and Sam Hennings.

== Plot ==
Martha and Jed Richards are a pioneer couple living in Oregon in the year 1862. They and their two young daughters moved there to make a new life, unfortunately later along the way both of their daughters tragically died after contracting cholera. This has left Martha an emotional wreck, and she is unable to move on with her life and cope with the loss. That is until an orphan little boy named Danny, comes to live with them after he recently lost both of his parents. Jed immediately accepts Danny as his son, but Martha, who continues mourning the death of her daughters is still too upset to be able to love him. As time passes, however, she finds herself more and more able to accept him as part of the family.

== Production ==
Parts of the film were shot in Salt Lake City, Utah.
