= Chasing a Dream =

2009 American TV movie

- Written by: Bryce Zabel; Jackie Zabel
- Directed by: David Burton Morris
- Starring: Andrew Lawrence; Treat Williams
- Theme music composer: Stephen Graziano
- Country of origin: United States
- Original language: English

Production
- Producers: Kevin Bocarde; Brian Gordon; Larry Levinson; Susan McGuire
- Cinematography: Brian Shanley
- Editor: Jennifer Jean Cacavas
- Running time: 120 minutes
- Production company: Larry Levinson Productions

Original release
- Network: Hallmark Channel
- Release: April 25, 2009

Chasing a Dream (working title Miles from Nowhere) is a made-for-television movie. Filmed in the Ventura County area of California, the movie premiered on Hallmark Channel on April 25, 2009, and stars Andrew Lawrence and Treat Williams.

Most of the school scenes were filmed at John F. Kennedy High School in Granada Hills, California. The logos, mascot (Golden Cougars), uniforms, and signage were all the official items for the school.

== Plot ==
Senior high school football star Cameron is traumatized when his best friend is killed in a car accident that he feels responsible for. When Cam learns that his best friend (a track star) was working on breaking the sub-four minute mile, he decides to honor his friend’s memory by accomplishing the goal for him. Cam is met with strong opposition from his football coach and father Gary, who feels he's throwing his sports opportunities away. The father-son disagreement begins to tear the family apart, but Cam continues to pursue his goal, hoping to put his friend’s memory to rest at last.

== Cast ==
- Treat Williams as Gary Stiles
- Joanna Going as Diane Stiles
- Andrew Lawrence as Cam Stiles
- Kevin Kilner as Lou, the track coach
- Jake McLaughlin as John Van Horn

== Filming locations ==
The track sequences and high school scenes were filmed on location at Royal High School in Simi Valley, California. Some of the running scenes where Cam jogs along the street were filmed on the street outside the Larry Levinson studios, also located in Simi Valley, California. The party scene was filmed in the parking lot of the studio.

== Critical reception ==
A reviewer at BlogCritics had mixed feelings about the film.

It is an enjoyable movie that will appeal to a lot of people. The theme of high school sports figures overcoming obstacles is always popular. This movie doesn’t have a lot of surprises, though. While I liked this movie [...] it seemed a bit bland to me. I thought the dialogue at times didn’t feel right. The plot was a bit predictable. In the end, this is what it’s meant to be. It is a nice family drama and a great alternative to network television on a Saturday night.

Star Magazine gave it 3 stars, saying that "Lawrence and Williams capture the father-son tension" well, and that Lawrence's performance is "moving." The magazine concludes: "This straightforward drama packs a strong emotional punch."

Most of the school scenes were filmed at John F. Kennedy High School in Granada Hills, California. The logos, mascot (Golden Cougars), uniforms, and signage were all the official items for the school.

== See also ==
- List of films about the sport of athletics
