= Jonathan Scarfe =

Canadian actor

- Born: Toronto, Ontario, Canada
- Occupation: Actor
- Years active: 1993–present
- Spouse: Suki Kaiser
- Children: 3
- Parent(s): Alan Scarfe; Sara Botsford
- Relatives: Barbara March (stepmother)

Jonathan Scarfe is a Canadian film and television actor, director and producer.

== Early life ==
He was born in Toronto, Ontario, to actors Alan Scarfe and Sara Botsford. He dropped out of high school at age 15, and at the age of 16 he spent a year working at the Stratford Festival, where he learned about acting.

== Career ==
=== Television ===
Scarfe's first major role was on the Canadian teen drama Madison. He appears in a recurring role as Chase Carter, the drug-abusing cousin of John Carter, on the medical-drama series ER. His television guest appearances include the police procedural series NYPD Blue, CSI: Miami, Cold Case; and the drama series The L Word, as well as the supernatural drama series Grimm.

Scarfe portrays Sheldon Kennedy in the biographical drama television film The Sheldon Kennedy Story (1999), which follows the story of Kennedy – a former professional ice-hockey player with the Calgary Flames – who, after years of self-blame, self-guilt and secrecy, spoke out against his former coach and mentor Graham James and the sexual abuse Kennedy endured. His other television films include the biographical drama television film Burn: The Robert Wraight Story (2003), portraying Jesus in the biographical drama television film Judas (2004)., costarring with Jennifer Finnigan in 2015 television film Angel of Christmas and Alison Sweeney in the Hallmark Channel movie "Love On The Air" 2015.

His most notable television roles are Charlie Sagansky in the legal drama series Raising the Bar (2008–2009), Sydney Snow in the western period drama series Hell on Wheels, Matt McLean on the family drama, Ties That Bind and Axel on the Syfy drama Van Helsing.

=== Film ===
He appears as protagonist Nicholas Brady in the science-fiction film Radio Free Albemuth (2009), directed by John Alan Simon and based on the novel of the same name (1985) by Philip K. Dick. Scarfe appears as Mormon prophet Joseph Smith in the historical-fiction drama film The Work and the Glory (2004) and its sequels. Scarfe also appears in 100 Days in the Jungle (2002), and White Lies (1998).

== Personal life ==
He is married to actress Suki Kaiser. At one point Scarfe took a break from acting and spent two and half years sailing around the world with his family.

== Filmography ==
=== Film ===
Year	Title	Role	Notes
1997	Dead Innocent	Jimmy	
1998	Boogie Boy	Leland Bowles	
1998	The Lesser Evil	Young Derek Eastman	
1998	Short for Nothing	Malcolm	
1999	Crosswalk	Dave Hiatt	Short
2002	Liberty Stands Still	Bill Tollman	
2002	Slap Shot 2: Breaking the Ice	Skipper Day	Video
2002	The Bay of Love and Sorrows	Michael Skid	
2004	The Work and the Glory	Joseph Smith	
2005	The Work and the Glory II: American Zion	Joseph Smith	
2006	The Work and the Glory III: A House Divided	Joseph Smith	
2007	The Poet	Oscar Koenig	
2010	Radio Free Albemuth	Nick Brady	
2018	The Equalizer 2	Resnik	

=== Television ===
Year	Title	Role	Notes
1993	Family Passions	Rolf	TV series
1994	Highlander: The Series	Kelly	"Courage"
1994	Hawkeye	Andrew	"The Warrior"
1994–1995	Madison	R.J. Winslow	Main role
1995	Murder, She Wrote	Jamie Carlson	"Game, Set, Murder"
1995	Lonesome Dove: The Series	Toby Finch	"Thicker Than Water"
1996	The Morrison Murders: Based on a True Story	Luke Morrison	TV film
1996	NYPD Blue	Ted Manos	"Ted and Carey's Bogus Adventure"
1996	The Outer Limits	Charlie Walters	"Straight and Narrow"
1997	Breaking the Surface: The Greg Louganis Story	Keith	TV film
1997	Poltergeist: The Legacy	Lucas	"Lives in the Balance"
1997	Daughters	Jimmy Romeo	TV film
1997	Total Security	Ted Hardy	"Who's Poppa?"
1997–2001	ER	Chase Carter	Recurring role
1998	White Lies	Ian McKee	TV film
1999	The Wrong Girl	Steve Fisher	TV film
1999	The Sheldon Kennedy Story	Sheldon Kennedy	TV film
1999	Diagnosis: Murder	Quinn Montgomery	"Murder at Midterm"
2000	Code Name Phoenix	Kenny Baker	TV film
2000	The Outer Limits	Vince	"Gettysburg"
2000	Blood Money	Peter Kafelnikoff	TV film
2000	Level 9	Cypher	"Mob.com"
2001	Gideon's Crossing	Chester / Uncle / Joey	"The Others"
2002	Tom Stone	Wyman	"The Grand Alliance"
2002	Philly	Tommy Cabretti	"There's No Business Like No Business"
2002	The Division	Arnold Milbank	"Full Moon"
2002	100 Days in the Jungle	Grunt	TV film
2003	The Atwood Stories	Fred	"Betty"
2003	Burn: The Robert Wraight Story	Robert Wraight	TV film
2003	Mafia Doctor	Danny	TV film
2003	Peacemakers	Dean Wilder	"A Town Without Pity"
2004	The Clinic (Animal clinic)	Andrew MacDonald	TV film
2004	Judas	Jesus	TV film
2004	The L Word	Matt	"Listen Up", "Liberally"
2004	CSI: Miami	Chase Shaw	"Legal"
2005	Dr. Vegas	Logan	"Babe in the Woods"
2005	Grey's Anatomy	Hank	"Shake Your Groove Thing"
2005	Into the West	General George Armstrong Custer	TV miniseries
2006	Commander in Chief	Richard Laughlin	"State of the Unions"
2006	Proof of Lies	Sam Buckner	TV film
2006	Above and Beyond	Bill Jacobson	TV miniseries
2007	Carolina Moon	Dwight Collier	TV film
2007	Crossing Jordan	Ken Scott	"Hubris"
2007	Cold Case	Will Paige, 1938	"World's End"
2007	Conspiracy	Cole Farris	"Pilot"
2008	Smallville	Robert Queen	"Veritas"
2008	Vipers	Cal Taylor	TV film
2008–2009	Raising the Bar	Charlie Sagansky	Main role
2009	Hidden Crimes	Kurt Warnecke	TV film
2010	The Glades	Mark Ellison	"Booty"
2010	One Angry Juror	Curtis	TV film
2010	Matadors	Mitch Galloway	TV film
2011	Flashpoint	Frank McCormick	"Collateral Damage"
2011	Law & Order: LA	Douglas Cantu	"Benedict Canyon"
2011	Desperate Housewives	Andrew	"And Lots of Security..."
2011	The Closer	Spencer Pittman	"A Family Affair"
2011	Hallelujah	Caleb	TV film
2012	Drew Peterson: Untouchable	Jeff Aberdeen	TV film
2012	Private Practice	Mr. Murphy	"You Break My Heart"
2012	Perception	Roger Probert	Recurring role
2012	Grimm	Reverend Calvin	"The Good Shepherd"
2014	Hell on Wheels	Sydney Snow	Recurring role (season 4)
2015	Love on the Air	Nick Linden	TV film
2015	Ties That Bind	Matt McLean	Main role
2015	Angel of Christmas	Brady Howe	TV film
2016	Dater's Handbook	George	TV film
2016	The Magicians	Joe	"Homecoming"
2016–2021	Van Helsing	Axel Miller	Main role, director, producer
2017	Bosch	Andy Fink	"The Sea King"
2017	Doubt	Officer Dixon	"Finally"
2017	Christmas Solo	Nate	TV film, post-production
2020	FBI: Most Wanted	Quentin Garvey	"Prophet"
2020	The 100	Conductor Doucette	"Welcome to Bardo" "Etherea" "The Stranger"

== See also ==
- List of Canadian actors
- List of people from Toronto
