= American Ride (TV series) =

- Created by: BYUtv
- Directed by: Matthew Hodgson; Scott Murphy; Tyler Weston
- Presented by: Stan Ellsworth
- Composer: Sam Cardon
- Country of origin: United States
- Original language: English
- No. of seasons: 10
- No. of episodes: 117

Production
- Producers: Derek Marquis; Scott Swofford; Jeff T. Miller; Stan Ellsworth
- Running time: 25 minutes

Original release
- Network: BYUtv
- Release: October 3, 2011 – July 4, 2016

American Ride is an American historical documentary series produced by BYUtv and hosted by motorcycle-riding host Stan Ellsworth. From the seat of his Harley Davidson, Ellsworth narrates the series focusing on pivotal events in American history and visits the places where those events unfolded. The show won a regional 2013 Emmy Award for best host.
