= Scott Swofford =

American film producer

- Occupation: Film producer
- Years active: 1988–present

Scott Swofford is an American film producer. He is a Latter-day Saint and produces IMAX films as well as other formats. When he was director of media for the LDS Church missionary department he developed the "I'm a Mormon" campaign. He has also worked as creative director for BYU Broadcasting. As such he was one of the main forces behind Granite Flats and director of Extinct.

== Filmography ==
- Legacy: A Mormon Journey (1990)
- Split Infinity (1992)
- The ButterCream Gang in Secret of Treasure Mountain (1993)
- Seasons of the Heart (1993)
- Rigoletto (1993 film)
- Best Western Film (Seasons of the Heart), Santa Clarita International Film Festival
