= Wyatt Oleff =

American actor (born 2003)

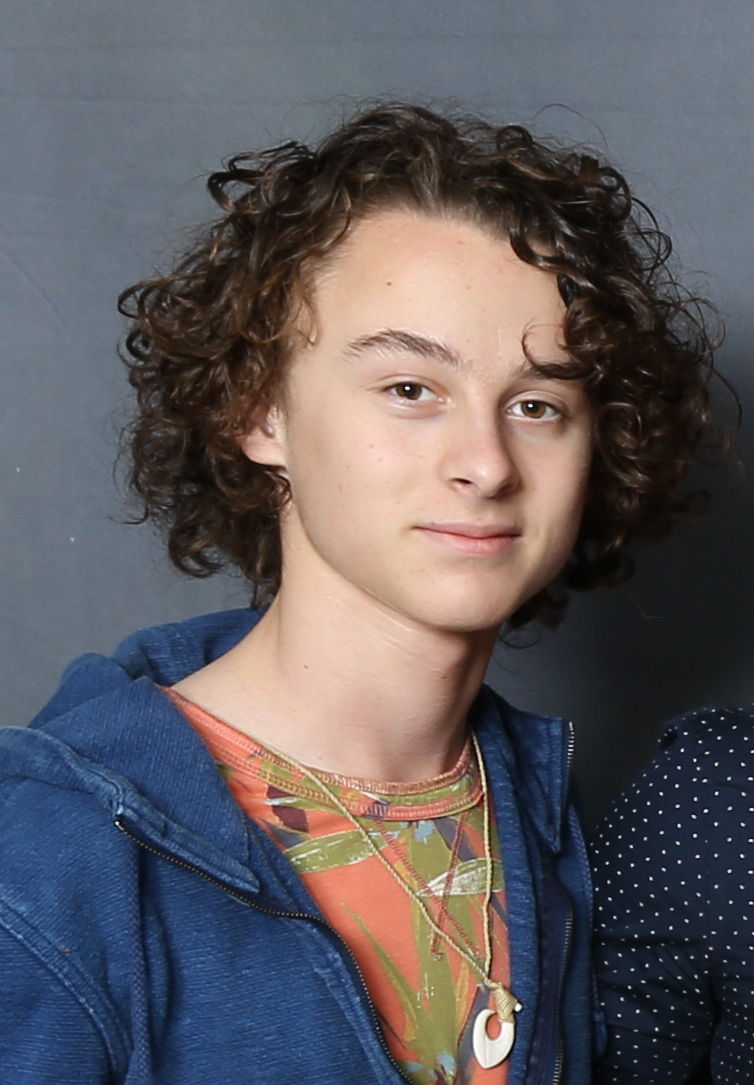
- Oleff in 2018
- Born: Wyatt Jess Oleff; July 13, 2003 (age 23); Chicago, Illinois, U.S.
- Occupation: Actor
- Years active: 2012–present

Wyatt Jess Oleff (born July 13, 2003) is an American actor, known for playing Stanley Uris in It and its 2019 sequel, as well as the role of Stanley Barber in I Am Not Okay with This (2020), and a young Peter Quill in the Marvel Cinematic Universe (MCU) superhero films Guardians of the Galaxy (2014) and Guardians of the Galaxy Vol. 2 (2017) by Marvel Studios.

== Early life ==
Oleff was born in Chicago, Illinois, to Doug and Jennifer Oleff, living there for the first seven years of his life. He then moved to Los Angeles with his parents and began acting. One of his earliest acting roles was in a commercial for Coldwell Banker.

== Filmography ==
Film
Year	Title	Role	Notes
2014	Someone Marry Barry	J.T.	
2014	Guardians of the Galaxy	Young Peter Quill	
2015	Crafty Or (the Unexpected Virtue of the Girl in Charge of Snacks)	Rocco	Short film
2017	Guardians of the Galaxy Vol. 2	Young Peter Quill	
2017	It	Stanley "Stan" Uris	
2019	It Chapter Two	Young Stanley "Stan" Uris	
2020	The Weight of Perfection	Walker	Short film
2020	Oh, Sorry	Sam	Short film
2022	Stay Awake	Ethan	
2022	The Year Between	Neil Miller	
2025	Karate Kid: Legends	Alan	
TBA	Wreckless †	Atlas	Filming

Television
Year	Title	Role	Notes
2012	Animal Practice	Young George	Episode: "Who's afraid of Virginia Coleman?"
2013	Middle Age Rage	Oliver Bobeck	TV movie
2013	Suburgatory	Kevuel	Episode: "T-ball & Sympathy"
2013	Shake it Up!	Byron / Kid	Episode: "Haunt it Up!"
2013	Once Upon a Time	Young Rumplestiltskin	Episode: "Think Lovely Thoughts"
2014	Scorpion	Owen	Episode: "Dominoes"
2015	The History of Us	Young Andrew	TV movie
2020	I Am Not Okay with This	Stanley Barber	Main cast
2020	Acting for a Cause	Lysander	Episode: "A Midsummer Night's Dream"
2023	City on Fire	Charlie	Main cast

Music videos
Year	Title	Artist	Role
2017	"Santa's Coming for Us"	Sia	Son

Podcasts
Year	Title	Role	Notes
2020	Day by Day	Greg	Episode: "Destiny Cinema 2"

== Awards and nominations ==
- Catalina Film Festival
  - 2017 — Crest Award—Acting — Guardians of the Galaxy; It (Won)
- MTV Movie & TV Awards
  - 2018 — MTV Movie Award for Best On-Screen Team (with Finn Wolfhard, Sophia Lillis, Jaeden Martell, Jack Dylan Grazer, Jeremy Ray Taylor, and Chosen Jacobs) — It (Won)
