= Tapped Out (film) =

2014 film by Allan Ungar

- Directed by: Allan Ungar
- Written by: Allan Ungar
- Produced by: Bruno Marino; Geoff Hart; Michael Sousa
- Starring: Michael Biehn; Anderson Silva; Cody Hackman; Martin Kove; Krzysztof Soszynski
- Cinematography: Pasha Patriki
- Edited by: Allan Ungar
- Music by: Ryner Stoetzer
- Distributed by: Lionsgate Home Entertainment
- Release dates: April 23, 2014 (Toronto premiere); May 27, 2014
- Running time: 108 minutes
- Countries: United States; Canada
- Language: English

Tapped Out is a 2014 action drama film directed by Allan Ungar and starring Michael Biehn, Krzysztof Soszynski, Anderson Silva, Lyoto Machida, Cody Hackman and Martin Kove. It was first released theatrically in Canada and Brazil, and then in North America on DVD and Blu-ray on May 27, 2014.

== Plot ==
At age twelve, Michael Shaw (Cody Hackman) is a prodigy in Karate. After receiving his brown belt in Karate, his parents' car is stopped on the way home by two armed car jackers. During the car jacking, one of the men kills both of Michael's parents before driving the car elsewhere, but the men never see Michael who is hiding in the back seat of the car. Michael sees a distinctive tattoo on the back of the neck of the man that killed his parents. When the car jacker arrives at his destination, Michael flees after the man leaves the car.

Seven years later, Michael is now a troubled teenager who is living with his grandfather. After getting in trouble at a party, he is sentenced to community service at a rundown Karate school owned and operated by Reggie Monroe (Michael Biehn), a friend of his father's. Although Michael at first only cares about finishing his community service hours he rediscovers his passion for the discipline he left behind long ago. Eventually Michael meets Reggie's niece Jen Monroe (Jess Brown). The two take an instant liking to one another and Jen invites him to a local Mixed Martial Arts fight.

While Jen is a fan of Mixed Martial Arts she asks Michael not to tell Reggie since her uncle isn't fond of the sport. During the fight, Michael recognizes one of the fighters, Dominic Grey (Krzysztof Soszynski), as the man who brutally murdered his parents seven years ago. Hurt and enraged, Michael takes it upon himself to find a way to exact revenge. At first he tries going to the police but the police are unable to act without any evidence. After being denied entry into the local Mixed Martial Arts circuit by the fight promoter Lou (Daniel Faraldo) Michael then follows Gray home and decides to kill him with a gun but finds himself unable to do so.

Michael again goes to the police and gives them Gray's address but the police still do not act. However one of the detectives that worked on the case involving Michael's parents takes a look into Michael's statements and decides to reopen the case.

Still seeking revenge for his parents, Michael decides to take Reggie up on an earlier offer to help train him in Karate but doesn't tell Reggie that he wishes to kill Gray in the ring. Through his training under Reggie, Michael becomes more proficient and skilled in combat. After hearing about an upcoming tournament where the fighter that defeats all the other fighters will have a chance to fight Dominic Gray for $50,000 Michael decides to take the opportunity in order to get his revenge. Although Lou still refuses to let Michael enter the circuit, he eventually relents when Michael firmly insists on entering and defeats Lou's bodyguard.

Michael wins a qualifying fight that allows him entry into the tournament. Reggie later finds out about Michael entering the upcoming tournament and the two have an argument which results in Michael leaving and training on his own. Jen later tells Reggie the reason why Michael is fighting and so Reggie decides to train him for the tournament. Reggie also enlists the help of his friends (Anderson Silva) and (Lyoto Machida) to help Michael train and learn every skill necessary in order to step into the cage and go toe to toe with the man who took everything from him. During his training Michael and Jen grow closer and begin a relationship.

The night before the fight Reggie gives Michael a black belt which he claims Michael's father told him he was only a few months away from earning. At the tournament, Michael fares well thanks to the training from Reggie and his friends. Michael makes his way up to the final fight by defeating all of his opponents with an impressive style of Karate. Before the final fight, Dominic tells Michael over the microphone that he will defeat him. In response, Michael tells how he witnessed his parents' murder over the microphone and vaguely reveals to Dominic that he knows it was him that committed the murder.

Realizing that Michael can identify him as the murderer of his parents, Dominic plans to kill him during the fight and make it look like an accident, a plan his manager comes up with. In the first round Dominic utilizes his strength and size and insults Michael about his parents but Michael holds his own with his speed and technique. In the second round, Dominic injures his knee against the cage after attempting to hit Michael with a knee strike and Michael starts taking advantage by kicking his knee. Before the third round, Dominic's manager pulls the referee out of the cage and locks the gate, much to everyone's surprise. Reggie confronts the manager and knocks him out with one punch.

During the final round, both Michael and Dominic fight with everything they have. Dominic eventually gets Michael in a chokehold and begins to strangle him to death. While in the chokehold Michael sees both his parents in the crowd. This gives Michael a second wind and he breaks the chokehold. Encouraged by both Reggie and the sight of his parents, Michael fights on.

Utilizing all of his Karate training, Michael overpowers Dominic and viciously continues beating him on the ground. Although Michael is tempted to kill him, he ultimately remembers Reggie's earlier advice about letting him live with what he had done and spares him by breaking his leg instead, thus winning the fight.

Having won the tournament Michael is awarded the $50,000 prize money but gives it to Reggie for his school as a token of gratitude for training him and helping him avenge his parents' death. After losing the fight, Dominic is humiliated and ridiculed by the audience. Sometime later, Reggie's Karate school is now thriving and a newspaper article states that Dominic had confessed to the murder of Michael's parents and was imprisoned. Michael and his grandfather later go to his parents' grave where Michael places his black belt on his parents' grave. His grandfather tells him that his parents would be proud of him.

== Cast ==
- Cody Hackman as Michael Shaw
  - Kyle Peacock as Young Michael Shaw
- Colin Paradine as Phil Shaw
- Kelly-Marie Murtha as Carol Shaw
- James Neely as Morris Shaw
- Michael Biehn as Reggie Munroe
- Krzysztof Soszynski as Dominic Gray
- Martin Kove as Principal Vanhorne
- Jess Brown as Jen Munroe
- Daniel Faraldo as Lou
- Anderson Silva as Anderson
- Lyoto Machida as Lyoto
- Nick Bateman as Matt Cockburn
- Tom Bolton as Detective Len Riley
- Emilio Chino Ramirez as Chino
- Stu Landry as Jimmy D
- Alys Crocker as Kristy
- Jodi Haynes as Britney
- Sam Stout as Sam
- Greg Rombis as Dom's Trainer
- Carlos Pinder as Dom's Posse #1
- Troy Caspi as Dom's Posse #2
- Julie-Anne Barbosa as Dom's Girlfriend

== Production ==
Filming took place over the course of 5 weeks in London, Ontario during September 2012, while scenes with Anderson Silva and Lyoto Machida were shot during November in Toronto, Ontario.
