= Allan Ungar =

Canadian film director, producer, and screenwriter

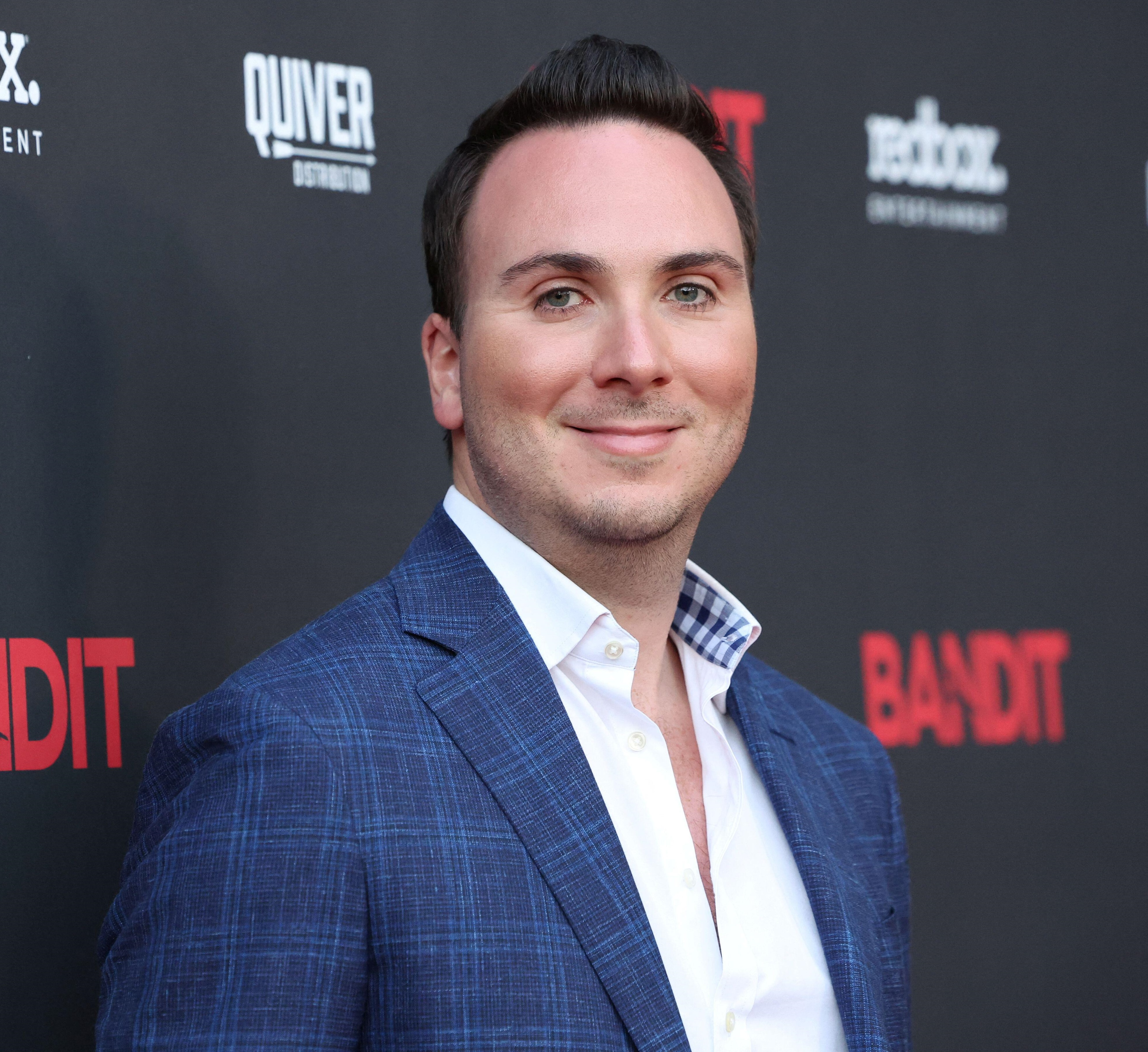
- Ungar at the premiere of Bandit in 2022
- Born: Toronto, Ontario, Canada
- Occupations: film director, producer, screenwriter
- Years active: 2012–present
- Notable work: Uncharted, Bandit

Allan Ungar is a Canadian film director, producer, and screenwriter known for the true crime drama Bandit, Sympathy for the Devil, and the Uncharted Live Action Fan Film.

== Career ==
When Ungar was 23 years old, he was hired to write and direct his first feature film Tapped Out, an MMA drama starring Michael Biehn, Anderson Silva, Krzysztof Soszynski and Martin Kove. Lionsgate Home Entertainment released the film on May 27, 2014. Ungar followed up his debut with the throwback action thriller, Gridlocked, starring Dominic Purcell, Danny Glover, Stephen Lang, Trish Stratus, and Saul Rubinek. The film had its world premiere at Fantastic Fest where it was sold to Netflix after being well received by audiences. Variety praised it as "brutally and divertingly efficient" while other critics called it an authentic tribute to buddy cop films of the 80s and 90s. The film was released by Netflix on June 14, 2016.

On July 16, 2018, Ungar and Nathan Fillion released a live action short film based on the Naughty Dog franchise Uncharted. The short immediately went viral and received critical acclaim for its witty humor, action, and ability to stay true to the source material. Fans and critics began campaigning for Netflix or YouTube to turn it into a series while referring to it as one of the best adaptations of a video game.

Ungar directed and produced the crime drama Bandit, a biopic based on the true story of The Flying Bandit starring Josh Duhamel, Elisha Cuthbert, Nestor Carbonell, and Mel Gibson. It was released theatrically by Quiver Distribution and Redbox Entertainment on September 23, 2022 to positive reviews. Critics declared it Josh Duhamel's career-best performance and gave praise to Ungar's stylish direction. One month after the film was released, Redbox announced that it was the most watched original title of 2022 and their 2nd-best release ever. The film debuted at #1 on multiple streaming platforms including Netflix, Paramount Plus, Amazon Prime, and Apple TV Canada, topping streaming charts around the world.

On December 16, 2022 it was announced that Ungar would be serving as an Executive Producer on the film adaptation of Death Stranding alongside Hideo Kojima and Barbarian producer Alex Lebovici. As a producer, Ungar has also been linked to numerous video game adaptations including Driver from Ubisoft, System Shock, and Colleen Hoover's best selling novel Ugly Love.

After producing the 2023 psychological thriller film Sympathy for the Devil, starring Nicolas Cage and Joel Kinnaman, Ungar reunited with Josh Duhamel for the action comedy film London Calling, which also starred Rick Hoffman, Jeremy Ray Taylor, and Aidan Gillen. It was screened in the Industry Selects program at the 2024 Toronto International Film Festival before being released theatrically by Quiver Distribution on September 19, 2025. The film was a global streaming success, landing at #1 on Netflix, HBO MAX Asia, and Starz, as well as climbing the charts to become the #2 film on Hulu.

== Filmography ==
Year	Film	Notes
2014	Tapped Out	Director/Writer
2015	Gridlocked	Director/Co-Writer
2015	The Sound	Producer
2018	Uncharted Live Action Fan Film	Director/Co-Writer/Producer
2022	Bandit	Director/Producer
2023	Sympathy for the Devil	Producer
2025	London Calling	Director/Producer/Writer
TBA	Death Stranding	Producer
