= Chosen Jacobs =

American actor

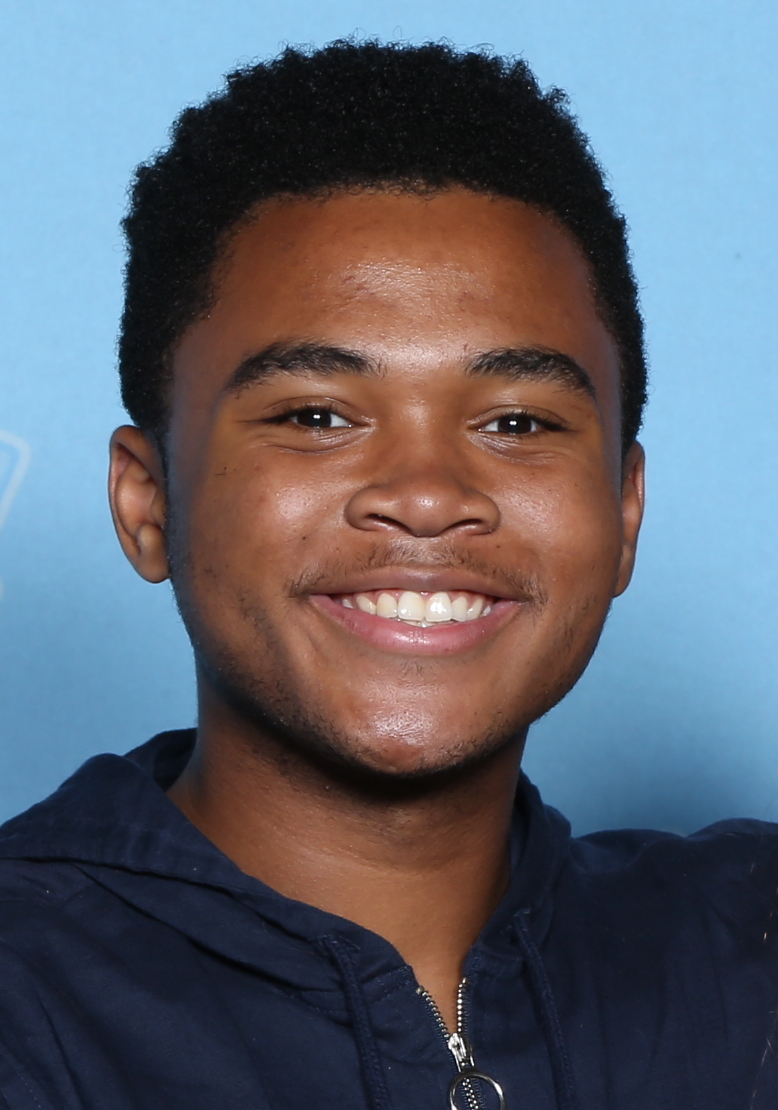
- Jacobs in 2019
- Born: July 1, 2001 (age 25); Springfield, Massachusetts, U.S.
- Occupations: Actor, singer, songwriter, musician, rapper
- Years active: 2016–present

Chosen Jacobs (born July 1, 2001) is an American actor, singer, songwriter, musician, and rapper best known for his recurring role as Will Grover on the CBS television series Hawaii Five-0 and his role as Mike Hanlon in the 2017 film adaptation of the Stephen King novel It, and its follow-up It Chapter Two.

== Life and career ==
Jacobs was born in Springfield, Massachusetts on July 1, 2001, and moved to Atlanta at a young age, where he was raised. He got his name from when his father heard a baby say something that sounded like "chosen." Jacobs started off as a musician, singing and playing the guitar and piano. He started acting when his mother enrolled him in theatre classes. His first acting role was in a commercial for Hot Wheels. In 2015, he moved to Hollywood to further his music and acting career.

== Filmography ==
=== Films ===
Year	Title	Role	Notes
2016	Remnants	George	Short film
2017	It	Michael "Mike" Hanlon	
2017	Cops and Robbers	Young Michael	
2019	It Chapter Two	Young Michael "Mike" Hanlon	
2022	Sneakerella	El	Disney+
2022	Purple Hearts	Frankie	Netflix
2022	Darby and the Dead	Alex	Hulu

=== Television ===
Year	Title	Role	Notes
2016–2018	Hawaii Five-0	Will Grover	7 episodes
2018	American Woman	William	Episode: "The Heat Wave"
2018	Castle Rock	Wendell Deaver	4 episodes
2020	God Friended Me	Zack Waller	5 episodes
2020	When the Streetlights Go On	Charlie Chambers	Main cast
2025	The Hunting Wives	Jamie	Recurring cast

== Awards and nominations ==
- Endless Mountains Film Festival
  - 2016 — Award for Best Supporting Actor in a Movie — Remnants (Won)
  - 2018 — MTV Movie Award for Best On-Screen Team (with Finn Wolfhard, Sophia Lillis, Jaeden Lieberher, Jack Dylan Grazer, Wyatt Oleff and Jeremy Ray Taylor) (Won)
