= It (2017 film) =

2017 supernatural horror film by Andy Muschietti

- Theatrical release poster
- Directed by: Andy Muschietti
- Screenplay by: Chase Palmer; Cary Joji Fukunaga; Gary Dauberman
- Based on: It by Stephen King
- Produced by: Roy Lee; Dan Lin; Seth Grahame-Smith; David Katzenberg; Barbara Muschietti
- Starring: Jaeden Lieberher; Bill Skarsgård
- Cinematography: Chung-hoon Chung
- Edited by: Jason Ballantine
- Music by: Benjamin Wallfisch
- Production companies: New Line Cinema; Lin Pictures; Vertigo Entertainment; KatzSmith Productions
- Distributed by: Warner Bros. Pictures
- Release dates: September 5, 2017 (TCL Chinese Theatre); September 8, 2017 (United States)
- Running time: 135 minutes
- Country: United States
- Language: English
- Budget: $35–40 million
- Box office: $719.8 million

It (titled onscreen as It Chapter One) is a 2017 American supernatural horror film directed by Andy Muschietti and written by Chase Palmer, Cary Joji Fukunaga, and Gary Dauberman. It is the first of a two-part adaptation of the 1986 novel of the same name by Stephen King, as well as the second adaptation following Tommy Lee Wallace's 1990 miniseries. Starring Jaeden Lieberher and Bill Skarsgård, the film was produced by New Line Cinema, KatzSmith Productions, Lin Pictures, and Vertigo Entertainment. Set in the fictional town of Derry, Maine, the film tells the story of The Losers' Club, a group of seven outcast children who are terrorized by the eponymous being which emerges from the sewer in the form of Pennywise the Dancing Clown (Skarsgård), and face their own personal demons as the monster torments them.

Development began in March 2009 by Warner Bros., with David Kajganich planned to direct, before being replaced by Fukunaga in June 2012. Fukunaga dropped out in May 2015 and was replaced by Muschietti in June. He drew inspiration from 1980s films including The Howling (1981), The Thing (1982), The Goonies (1985), Stand by Me (1986) and Near Dark (1987), and cited the influence of Steven Spielberg. The film was moved to New Line Cinema division in May 2014. Principal photography began in Toronto on June 27, 2016, and ended on September 21, 2016. It was filmed on locations in the Greater Toronto Area, including Port Hope, Oshawa, and Riverdale. Benjamin Wallfisch was hired in March 2017 to compose the musical score.

It premiered at the TCL Chinese Theatre, Los Angeles, on September 5, 2017, and was released in the United States on September 8, in 2D and IMAX formats. A critical and commercial success, the film set box office records and grossed over $704 million worldwide, becoming the third-highest-grossing R-rated film at the time of its release, and grossed over $719 million through subsequent re-releases. Unadjusted for inflation, it became the highest-grossing horror film of all time. The film received generally positive reviews, with critics praising the performances, direction, cinematography and musical score, and was called one of the best Stephen King adaptations. It received numerous awards and nominations, including a nomination for the Critics' Choice Movie Award for Best Sci-Fi/Horror Movie. It appeared on several critics' end-of-year lists. The second film, It Chapter Two, was released in 2019, covering the remainder of the book. A prequel television series, It: Welcome to Derry, premiered on HBO in 2025, with Skarsgård returning as Pennywise.

== Plot ==
In October 1988, twelve-year-old Bill Denbrough makes a paper sailboat for his seven-year-old brother Georgie. Georgie sails the boat along rainy streets, only to have it fall down a storm drain. Attempting to retrieve it, Georgie sees a clown in the drain, who introduces himself as "Pennywise the Dancing Clown". Pennywise bites off Georgie's arm and drags him into the sewer.

The following summer, Bill and his friends Richie Tozier, Eddie Kaspbrak, and Stanley Uris run afoul of older bullies Henry Bowers, Belch Huggins, Patrick Hockstetter, and Victor Criss. Bill calculates that his brother's body may have washed up in the marshy wasteland "The Barrens". He investigates with his friends, believing Georgie may still be alive. New in town, Bill's classmate Ben Hanscom learns that unexplained tragedies and child disappearances have plagued Derry for centuries. Fleeing Bowers' posse, Ben meets Bill's group in the Barrens. They find the sneaker of missing girl Betty Ripsom. Patrick is killed by drowned children while searching the sewers.

Bill and Ben develop feelings for bullied girl Beverly Marsh. The group befriends orphan Mike Hanlon, having rescued him from Bowers. Each member of the group has encountered terrifying manifestations of Pennywise: Ben is chased by a headless undead boy, Beverly is attacked by a sink spewing blood, Eddie is chased by a rotting leper, Stan witnesses a painting of a woman coming alive, Mike relives his parents burning alive, and a phantom of Georgie haunts Bill. No adults see what they witness. Dubbing themselves "The Losers Club", they realize they are all being stalked by the same entity, which they dub "It". They deduce that It appears as their individual worst fears, awakening from hibernation every 27 years to feed on the children of Derry, traveling via the sewer lines. In his garage, Bill shows the Losers blueprints of Derry's sewer lines, which lead to an old well under an abandoned house on Neibolt Street. After Pennywise attacks them in the garage, the group attempts to confront It in the Neibolt house, only to be separated and terrorized by their fears. It charges at them, but Beverly stabs It in the head with a metal spike. Pennywise retreats after injuring Ben. The group flees; traumatized by their experience, they separate.

Weeks later, after Beverly confronts and incapacitates her sexually abusive father, Pennywise abducts her. The Losers return to the abandoned house to rescue her. Bowers, who has murdered his abusive father after being driven insane by Pennywise, attacks the group; Mike pushes Bowers down the well. The Losers descend into the sewers and find Pennywise's lair, which contains decayed circus props and children's belongings, above which the bodies of It's child victims float in mid-air. Beverly, catatonic after being exposed to Deadlights (Note: A magical plot device that appear in some of Stephen King's writings.) inside It's gaping mouth, is restored to consciousness when Ben kisses her. Bill encounters Georgie, but realizes he is Pennywise in disguise. Pennywise takes Bill hostage, offering to spare the others and hibernate if they abandon Bill. The Losers reject this, battling Pennywise while overcoming their various fears. The Losers beat Pennywise before Beverly stabs It in the face with a broken pipe. It retreats, falling down a well. Bill finds Georgie's bloodstained raincoat, and the group comfort him as he cries.

As summer ends, Beverly informs the group of a vision she had while catatonic, of them fighting Pennywise again as adults. The Losers swear a blood oath that they will return if Pennywise ever returns. After the others make their goodbyes and disperse, Beverly and Bill discuss her moving away to live with her aunt. Bill reveals his feelings and they kiss.

== Cast ==
- Jaeden Lieberher as Bill Denbrough:
  The leader of the group of kids known as the Losers Club, who vows to get revenge on the monster with the help of his friends. Bill losing his brother makes the battle against it a more personal crusade for him than any of the others. That and his stutter is what binds him to the group and transforms him into Big Bill, the leader. On the character of Bill, Muschietti stated: "Bill is like a ghost in his own home: nobody sees him because his parents can't get over Georgie's death." Ty Simpkins was considered for the role in Cary Joji Fukunaga's production. On the description of his character, Lieberher remarked of Bill that: "He's very strong and never backs down. He does what he thinks is right and would do anything for the people that he loves." Lieberher spoke of influences such as YouTube and Colin Firth's performance in The King's Speech (2010) in assisting him to develop Bill's stutter, while researching and getting used to stuttering on certain words, certain syllables, certain letters and sounds.
- Bill Skarsgård as It / Pennywise The Dancing Clown: (Note: The name Bob Gray is used by Bill Skarsgård at a Q&A session with Dread Central, and additionally by Barbara Muschietti on July 27, 2017.)
  An ancient, trans-dimensional evil that awakens every twenty-seven years. Will Poulter was previously cast in the role but was forced to drop out due to scheduling conflicts, with Poulter stating, "I was [attached] when Mr. Fukunaga was directing, but the circumstances at New Line are such that a new director's attached now." Poulter continued, "I think, with all due respect to him of course, I was selected by Cary and subscribed to Cary's vision for the movie, and so I haven't had a chance to connect with that [new] director." Mark Rylance, Ben Mendelsohn, Kirk Acevedo, Hugo Weaving, Jenny Slate, and Tilda Swinton were considered for the role, with Mendelsohn passing on the project, as New Line wanted him to take a sizable pay cut. On June 3, 2016, The Independent officially reported, after final negotiations took place, that Muschietti had chosen Skarsgård to portray the character. On portraying Pennywise, Skarsgård stated, "It's such an extreme character. Inhumane, It's beyond even a sociopath, because he's not even human. He's not even a clown. I'm playing just one of the beings It creates." Skarsgård described the character further, saying, "It truly enjoys the shape of the clown Pennywise, and enjoys the game and the hunt." He also commented, "What's funny to this evil entity might not be funny to everyone else. But he thinks it's funny." On Pennywise's design, Skarsgård stated, "It's important that we do something fresh and original for this one. It's purposely not going toward that weird, greasy look." He also commented on being compared to Tim Curry, stating that, "Curry's performance was truly great, but it's important for me to do something different because of that. I'll never be able to make a Tim Curry performance as good as Tim Curry." Skarsgård also elaborated on his age, stating, "There's a childishness to the character, because he's so closely linked to the kids. The clown is the manifestation of children's imaginations, so there's something child-like about that." Producer Dan Lin spoke of Skarsgård's physical attributes: "His build is really interesting. He's really tall and lanky, and feels a little clown like in his movement. When he came in — we had a lot of different actors read, and when he came in he had a different spin on the character that got us really excited." Lin concluded by comparing the character with that of Heath Ledger's Joker, "You've had [Ledger] doing almost a clown joker, you've seen obviously Tim Curry as a clown. We wanted someone who created a Pennywise character that would stand on its own and Bill came in and created this character that frankly freaked us out." Muschietti spoke of Skarsgård's Pennywise as one not to lurk in the shadows, to which he remarked, "Pennywise shows up, he's front and center, and he does his show. He has an act. So it's weird all the time, and every little thing implies a further threat." Muschietti also spoke of wanting to make the sense of dread that grows in Derry part of the dread of Pennywise, to which he stated, "He's not just a character that can shape-shift, his influence is all around. The anticipation of him is almost scarier than the actual Pennywise scares." On selecting Skarsgård to portray Pennywise, Muschietti wanted to stay true to the essence of the character, and Skarsgård caught his attention, "The character has a childish and sweet demeanor, but there's something very off about him. Skarsgård has that balance in him. He can be sweet and cute, but he can be pretty disturbing." Producer Barbara Muschietti referred to Skarsgård's Pennywise as "the ancestral clown", shunning 21st century modern clown characteristics and instead hearkening back to 18th century aesthetics with 'upgrades'."
- Jeremy Ray Taylor as Ben Hanscom:
  A shy, overweight boy with a crush on Beverly, who relays the incidents of Derry's past to his friends. On the character of Ben, Muschietti spoke of him knowing a situation of despair, on top of the terror of It and the fear of heights, and added, "Ben is bullied at school."
- Sophia Lillis as Beverly Marsh:
  A flame-haired tomboy who fends off an abusive father at home, while forming a strong bond with Ben. Beverly's Losership wasn't defined by the fact she was abused but by her poverty. On the character of Marsh, Muschietti stated, "Beverly's case is of course the worst, because it's about sexual abuse on a minor." In an interview with Rolling Stone, Lillis spoke of Muschietti not wanting herself and her co-stars to spend too much time with Skarsgård: "We actually weren't allowed to see him until our scenes, because we wanted the horror to be real." On the character of Beverly, Lillis described her as: "Kind of a tough person. She hides herself. She tries to hide her emotions and hide her feelings. She distances herself from everyone but once she has this friend group she doesn't want to let it go because this is the only friend group that she has and so she's a very strong character." Working with Muschietti, Lillis and he developed Beverly as rebelling against her father, with Lillis having independence with the character, while also stating, "We definitely talked about her mother, who was never there — she wasn't even in the movie, but we talked about background for the character." Lillis spoke of how Beverly is someone she aspires to be, relating to her strength, her way of facing her fears: "When I read about her, I kind of got the sense that she was someone I could definitely look up to. I would be happy if I had any similarity to her." On her connection with her fellow co-stars she noted that the closeness of the friendships formed allowed Lillis connect with her own character: "I relate to Beverly – the way she deals with her emotions, and the way she was around the Losers. I felt that way around the actual actors."
- Finn Wolfhard as Richie Tozier:
  The bespectacled best friend of Bill, whose loud mouth and foul language often get him into trouble. Wolfhard shared the first image of the Losers Club on his Instagram account, with the photo captioned as "The Losers Club take Toronto", showing the cast of actors who will be playing the protagonists of the piece. He auditioned for the part of Richie for Fukunaga's It in 2015, before Fukunaga left, with Wolfhard being the only actor cast in both Muschietti and Fukanaga's version. On the character of Richie, Muschietti stated, "We don't know much about Richie's personality, because he's the big mouth of the group. But we suppose he's also neglected at home, and he's the clown of the band because he needs attention." Of his character's changes from the novel to the film, Wolfhard stated, "Richie's always been the same. There's some similarities to the book and there's other stuff they added because some of the stuff that we said in this movie you can't say in the '50s." Wolfhard felt that there wasn't much research required in approaching Richie: " You just have to read the character breakdown and it helps a lot to see the difference between the characters in the book, and the miniseries, as well to get a raw take on it." In an interview with GQ, Wolfhard spoke of how all of The Losers bonded on set, and that the friendship has carried over: "That friendship is for real, for sure. Every time I'm in L.A., I stay with Wyatt, who plays Stanley. We hang out all the time in L.A. and wherever they are."
- Chosen Jacobs as Mike Hanlon:
  A sweet, softly-spoken black boy living on the outskirts of Derry on his Grandfather's farm. When describing Mike, Jacobs stated that although Mike is more independent in characterization, he is still an eighties character, while elaborating by stating: "I mean he doesn't have any friends growing up, isolated, black, in the eighties, in a primarily Caucasian environment, so I think he's just got a sweetness about him." On the characterization of Mike, Jacobs said: "Finding friends that accept him for who he is means a lot to him. So he would never betray that friendship, and I feel like I'm kind of that way or at least I try to be." Jacobs also mentioned: "I always say this because it's so true, Mike is the best friend anyone could ask for, just because he's been so isolated and he really appreciates friendships." while stating that he was excited to portray Mike as: "I loved the depth of Mike, because he's just kind of a sweet, backbone type of guy. He's the guy you bring back to moms. I appreciated being able to play that character." Jacobs felt that portraying Mike wasn't difficult as he just had to channel the best aspects of himself, while suggesting they have many similarities and some differences. He brought up the element of Mike being one of the only African-Americans in Derry, while stating that he and the other Losers all have similar isolationism: "He grew up the outsider because of racial tension, which separated him that makes him really appreciate when someone says, 'Hey, I like you for who you are.'" Jacobs highlighted the bond Mike shares with his Losers' Club friends while also stating: "Pennywise is just a symbol for all the hard things that happen in life that bring people together. Of course we changed. We became more mature. Some people break out of their shells, some people retract into themselves because it's scary. This horror film is more than just horror. It's a coming-of-age movie. On the experience of shooting Muschietti's film, Jacobs spoke of it as "my favorite summer of my 16 long years on earth"
- Jack Dylan Grazer as Eddie Kaspbrak:
  A sickly boy who only feels truly well when he is with his friends. The off-screen friendships began to influence the onscreen friendships, with Grazer recalling a scene where they were able to draw on their genuine feelings for one another for a particularly emotional scene: We're lifelong friends now in reality and in the movie. We're shooting a scene now where Stanley or Wyatt is breaking down and we're all huddling around him crying and it's an amazing powerful scene. Because of the friendships, it's real." He highlighted his enjoyment of the intense scenes he had with Skarsgård, stating: "I remember one scene after he was done choking me and stuff, he goes, Jack, are you okay? And I was like, 'Yeah! That was so much fun! I love what you're doing with the character, like let's do that again." On his experiences with Muschietti, Grazer mentioned his usage of storyboards for scenes while also stating But to break us into character – I actually felt like I was pretty close to Eddie – we'd stick to our guns about a lot of things, we really didn't back down on our opinions." Grazer spoke of his appreciation of films such as Lethal Weapon 2 (1989) and Batman (1989) that gave him "insight on how he could improvise or reuse those things as references to the time period."
- Wyatt Oleff as Stanley Uris:
  The pragmatic son of a rabbi, whose bar mitzvah studies are haunted by a ghoulish woman from a painting. Muschietti made Stanley the son of a rabbi, which is a change from the novel, to add a bit of that sense of responsibility, while to show oppression from his father, with the theme of oppression being a recurring force in the story of the adults of Derry. Oleff recalled his first scene shot being a speech at his bar mitzvah: "I had a ton of lines to memorize and they even added a whole new paragraph while we were filming. I was like, Oh boy. After a while it got a lot easier to say over and over gain [sic] it was, like, 10 hours filming that scene." On the character of Stanley, Oleff spoke by stating: "Stanley, in the group is the last one to believe that It is actually real because he just doesn't want to. It doesn't fit within his reality until something happens. He relates to everyone, but he's the one who tries to organize everything, but he can't. It's falling apart for him and his friends come to support him." While Oleff stated Stanley as having OCD remarked: "He tries to lay everything out in his own mind pattern kinda thing. And Pennywise comes along and just shatters everything. He's definitely the most scared." Stanley suffers from an injury sustained at the end of Muschietti's It, to which Oleff remarks "He's been scarred, I guess you can say but Stanley is scarred mentally and physically by these marks. They're permanent, so every time he would look in the mirror he'd see it and be reminded about what happened." Oleff spoke of his research into the 1980s in which his parents helped him as "They told me a lot about the '80s and what music. I've been listening to a lot of '80s music recently. That's helped me get into character. I made a playlist of what I think Stanley would listen to in the '80s." Oleff also spoke of the fellowship between his co-stars and himself, where he states "I think that translates on screen. You could see the friendship we have on and off-screen. We've been together for so long that you can see our connection, in our characters, but also it's us connecting as humans and friends." Relating to sensitivity in emotions, Oleff compared himself to Stanley when stating: "Stanley tries to hide his emotions and sometimes I accidentally do that as well. So I can definitely relate to him in that way. One way to describe Stanley is like the voice of reason that no one listens to and that's also me in real life."
- Nicholas Hamilton as Henry Bowers:
  A young sociopath who leads the Bowers Gang, and terrorizes the Losers' Club. On the character of Bowers, Hamilton stated: "You see a lot of characters in movies who are just bullies and just there to be the antagonist and mess with the main character. With Bowers, he has so many different layers to him, with his father being the way he is and him having to live up to that." Hamilton prepared for the role by studying Jarred Blancard's portrayal of the character in It (1990), and in Hamilton's words: "watched all the bits of my original character" for research. Blancard spoke to Hamilton, with Blancard giving him advice on how to handle some of the "psychopathic-ness" and general meanness of Bowers. Hamilton added, through the character of Bowers, that "There's stuff that I have to do that is really creepy and the opportunity to help share my psychotic side has been really fun." Additionally Hamilton spoke of a scene shared with Ray Taylor, wherein he had to "terrorize the hell out of him and get right in his face." Hamilton highlighted the generic portrayal bullying and the bully in "in any movie", to which he stated: "Bowers and his gang are just so much different. There's a story, there's layers, he's vulnerable at times, he's not just the dick, so I really like that. There's definitely stuff to play around with."
- Jackson Robert Scott as Georgie Denbrough: The innocent, energetic 7-year-old brother of Bill Denbrough, whose disappearance at the hands of Pennywise results in the next summer's events.
- Owen Teague as Patrick Hockstetter, a psychopath who keeps a refrigerator full of animals that he has killed;
- Logan Thompson as Victor "Vic" Criss, the inseparable friend of Henry Bowers;
- Jake Sim as Reginald "Belch" Huggins, the biggest, strongest and clumsiest member of the Bowers Gang;
- Javier Botet as The Leper, a rotting homeless man that encounters Eddie Kaspbrak under the porch of the house on 29 Neibolt Street;
- Tatum Lee as Judith, one of It's horrifying creations;
- Steven Williams as Leroy Hanlon, the grandfather of Mike Hanlon who runs a nearby abattoir;
- Stephen Bogaert as Alvin Marsh, the abusive father of Beverly Marsh;
- Geoffrey Pounsett as Zack Denbrough, the father of Bill and George Denbrough;
- Pip Dwyer as Sharon Denbrough, the caring and loving mother of Bill and George Denbrough;
- Ari Cohen as Rabbi Uris, Stanley Uris's father and mentor in the Jewish religion;
- Stuart Hughes as Oscar "Butch" Bowers, a racist and abusive officer of the Derry Police Department who is the father of Henry Bowers. Butch has a strong dislike towards the Hanlon family, especially Leroy;
- Megan Charpentier as Greta Bowie, a snobby and stuck-up student in Mrs. Douglas's class and a classmate of the Losers Club at Derry Middle School, who lives in the richer parts of Derry.

== Production ==
The project was in ongoing development since 2009. The proposed film adaptation has gone through two major phases of planning: initially with Cary Joji Fukunaga from 2009 to 2015, with the early contributions of screenwriter David Kajganich, and with Andy Muschietti, with Fukunaga remaining in some capacity due to prior screenplay contributions.

=== David Kajganich (2009–2010) ===
"The thing about Stephen King's writing is that he draws his characters so well, it's hard not to imagine they're real people. So it honestly didn't occur to me to try to think of actors in those roles. Pennywise is a bit of a different story, though. His manner is so crucial to what's frightening about him, and it's too much fun to imagine all of the nuances different actors could give him. I think there are a hundred actors who could each pull off a fascinating, horrifying Pennywise, and I tried not to get too attached to any one actor in my head. I think the Pennywise in this adaptation is a less self-conscious of his own irony and surreality than was Tim Curry's Pennywise. I think it will be harder to laugh at his antics since, under the permissiveness of an R rating, I was able to give him back a lot of his more upsetting moments from the novel, ones that could never be aired on network television."

— David Kajganich, on the construction of Pennywise.

On March 12, 2009, Variety reported that Warner Bros. Pictures would be bringing Stephen King's novel to the big screen, with David Kajganich to adapt King's novel, while Dan Lin, Roy Lee and Doug Davison would be producing the piece. When Kajganich learned of Warner Bros. plans to adapt King's novel, he went after the job. Knowing that Warner Bros. was committed to adapting It as a single feature film, Kajganich began to attempt to try to find a structure that would accommodate such a large number of characters in two different time periods, around 120 pages, which was one of Warner Bros. stipulations. Kajganich worked with Lin, Lee, and Davison on The Invasion (2007), and he knew they would champion good storytelling, and allow him the time to work out a solid first draft of the screenplay. Kajganich spoke of the remake being set in the, "mid-1980s and in the present mirroring the twenty-odd-year gap King uses in the book and with a great deal of care and attention paid to the backstories of all the characters."

Kajganich also mentioned that Warner Bros wished for the adaptation to be rated R which he furthered by saying, "we can really honor the book and engage with the traumas that these characters endure.", while Kajganich spoke of Warner Bros. wanting the adaptation as a single film. On June 29, 2010, the screenplay was being re-written by Kajganich. He said that his dream choice for Pennywise would be Buster Keaton if he were still alive, and the Pennywise that Kajganich scripted was "less self-conscious of his own irony and surreality."

=== Cary Joji Fukunaga (2012–2015) ===
"I am in the midst of rewriting the first script now. We're not working on the second part yet. The first script is just about the kids. It's more like The Goonies (1985) meets a horror film. We're definitely honoring the spirit of Stephen King, but the horror has to be modernized to make it relevant. That's my job, right now, on this pass. I'm working on making the horror more about suspense than visualization of any creatures. I just don't think that's scary. What could be there, and the sounds and how it interacts with things, is scarier than actual monsters."

— Cary Fukunaga, on the development of It.

On June 7, 2012, The Hollywood Reporter had revealed that Cary Joji Fukunaga was boarding the project as director and will co-write the script with Chase Palmer, while Roy Lee and Dan Lin are producing, as with Seth Grahame-Smith and David Katzenberg of KatzSmith Productions. On May 21, 2014, Warner Bros. was announced to have moved the film to its New Line Cinema division, with overseer duties conducted by New Line's Walter Hamada and Dave Neustadter, along with Vice President of Production at Warner Bros., Niija Kuykendall. On December 5, 2014, in an interview with Vulture, Dan Lin announced that the first film will be a coming-of-age story about the children tormented by It and the second will skip ahead in time as those same characters band together to continue the fight as adults. Lin also stated that Fukunaga was only committed to directing the first film, though was currently closing a deal to co-write the second. Lin concluded by mentioning King, to which he remarked, "The most important thing is that [King] gave us his blessing. We didn't want to make this unless he felt it was the right way to go, and when we sent him the script, the response that Cary got back was, 'Go with God, please! This is the version the studio should make.' So that was really gratifying." Lin confirmed that Fukunaga would begin principal photography in Summer 2016.

On February 3, 2015, Fukunaga was interviewed by Slate wherein he spoke about It, while mentioning he has someone in mind for the role of Pennywise. On March 3, 2015, Fukunaga spoke of the film, particularly noting his goal to find the "perfect guy to play Pennywise". Fukunaga also revealed that he, Kajganich and Palmer had changed the names and dates in the script, adding, the spirit is similar to what he'd like to see in cinemas." On May 4, 2015, it was officially announced that Will Poulter had been cast to play Pennywise, after Fukunaga was "blown away" by his audition. Ty Simpkins was considered to play one of The Losers' Club members.

On May 25, 2015, it was reported that Fukunaga had dropped out as the director of It. According to TheWrap, Fukunaga clashed with the studio and didn't want to compromise his artistic vision in the wake of budget cuts by New Line, which greenlit the first film at $30 million. However, Fukunaga maintained that wasn't the case, with him stating he had bigger disagreements with New Line over the direction of the story: "I was trying to make an unconventional horror film. It didn't fit into the algorithm of what they knew they could spend and make money back on based on not offending their standard genre audience." He made mention that the budget was perfectly fine, as well as his desire to make Pennywise more than just the clown. Fukunaga concluded by stating, "We invested years and so much anecdotal storytelling in it. Chase and I both put our childhood in that story. So our biggest fear was they were going to take our script and bastardize it so I'm actually thankful that they are going to rewrite the script. I wouldn't want them stealing our childhood memories and using that. I was honoring King's spirit of it, but I needed to update it. King saw an earlier draft and liked it." On Fukunaga's departure, King wrote, "The remake of IT may be dead or undead but we'll always have Tim Curry. He's still floating down in the sewers of Derry."

=== Andy Muschietti (2015–2017) ===
"...the way Cary intended to execute the script is something that only he can talk about. I can say my version of It highly emphasizes Pennywise's most terrifying virtue, which is its ability to materialize into your worse fear; I want to take people in a journey into Pennywise's world through a disturbing, surrealistic and intoxicating experience that will leave nobody at ease."

— Andy Muschietti, on his version of It.

On July 16, 2015, it was announced that Andy Muschietti was in negotiations to direct It, with New Line beginning a search for a new writer to tailor a script to Muschietti's vision, with the announcement also confirming the possible participation of Muschietti's sister, Barbara Muschietti, as a producer, and Richard Brener joining Hamada, Neustadter and Kuykendall to oversee the project. On April 22, 2016, it was indicated that Will Poulter, who was originally tapped to portray Pennywise in Fukunaga's version, had dropped out of the film due to a scheduling conflict and that executives were meeting with actors to portray the antagonist. On April 22, 2016, New Line Cinema set the film for a release of September 8, 2017.

On October 30, 2015, Muschietti was interviewed by Variety wherein he spoke about his vision of It, while mentioning Poulter was still in the mix for the role of Pennywise: "Poulter would be a great option. For me he is at the top of my list." He confirmed that next summer is the time for them to start shooting. It was decided to shoot It during the summer months to give them the time to work with the children who have the main roles in the first part of the film. Muschietti went on to say that "King described 50s' terror iconography," adding that he feels there is a whole world now to "rediscover, to update." He said there won't be any mummies or werewolves and that the "terrors are going to be a lot more surprising." On February 19, 2016, at the D.I.C.E. Summit 2016 producer Roy Lee confirmed that Fukunaga and Chase Palmer's original script had been rewritten, with Lee remarking, "It will hopefully be shooting later this year. We just got the California tax credit Dauberman wrote the most recent draft working with Muscetti, so it's being envisioned as two movies."

On May 5, 2016, in an interview with Collider, David Kajganich expressed uncertainty as to whether drafts of his original screenplay would be used by Dauberman and Muschietti, with the writer stating, "We know there's a new director, I don't know myself whether he's going back to any of the previous drafts or writing from scratch. I may not know until the film comes out. I don't know how it works! If you find out let me know."

On June 2, 2016, Jaeden Lieberher was confirmed to be portraying lead protagonist, Bill Denbrough. On June 2, 2016, The Hollywood Reporter reported that Bill Skarsgård was in final negotiations to star as Pennywise, whose cast will also include Finn Wolfhard, Jack Dylan Grazer, Wyatt Oleff, Chosen Jacobs and Jeremy Ray Taylor. On June 2, 2016, there was a call for 100 background performers, with the background actor call going from 3 p.m. to 7 p.m. and by 4 p.m. more than 300 people had gone through; the casting call also asked for a marching band and period cars between 1970 and 1989. On February 18, 2016, The Hollywood Reporter reported that Owen Teague was set to portray Patrick Hocksetter. On June 21, 2016, it was officially announced that Nicholas Hamilton had been cast to play Henry Bowers. On June 21, 2016, Bloody Disgusting reported that Javier Botet was added to the cast shortly before filming commenced. On June 22, 2016, Deadline Hollywood reported that Muschietti had chosen actress Sophia Lillis to portray Beverly Marsh. On June 24, 2016, Moviepilot reported that Stephen Bogaert was added to the cast shortly before filming commenced, with Bogaert portraying Al Marsh, the abusive father of Beverly Marsh.

On July 22, 2016, Barbara Muschietti was interviewed by Northumberland News' Karen Longwell, wherein she spoke about the filming locations on It, while mentioning the beauty of Port Hope being one of the reasons as to why it was chosen, while Muschietti added, "We were looking for an idyllic town, one that would be a strong contrast to the story. Port Hope is the kind of place we all wish we had grown up in: long summers riding bicycles, walks by the lake, a lovely main street, charming homes with green lawns, warm people." Muschietti also mentioned that 360 extras from the area, from adults to tiny kids, had been involved.

On August 11, 2016, at The CW TCA presentation for the upcoming series Frequency, producer Dan Lin spoke of the piece's comparison to Netflix's Stranger Things, with Lee describing It being a "homage to 80s movies", while remarking: "I think a great analogy is actually Stranger Things, and we're seeing it on Netflix right now. It's very much an homage to '80s movies, whether it's classic Stephen King or even Spielberg. Think about Stand by Me (1986) as far as the bonding amongst the kids. But there is a really scary element in Pennywise." Lin continued, speaking of how well the young cast has bonded in these first weeks of shooting. Lin stated, "We clearly had a great dynamic amongst the kids. Really great chemistry is always a challenging thing with a movie like It because you're casting kids who don't have a ton of experience, but it ended up being really natural. Each kid, like a The Goonies (1985) or Stand by Me (1986), has a very specific personality and they're forming the loser's club obviously. We've spent a few months getting the kids to bond and now they're going to fight this evil, scary clown."

On February 9, 2017, at the press day for The Lego Batman Movie (2017), Lin confirmed that It is going to be rated R by the MPAA, to which he stated to Collider.com's Steve Weintraub, "If you're going to make a "Rated-R movie", you have to fully embrace what it is, and you have to embrace the source material. It is a scary clown that's trying to kill kids. They do have a scary clown that's taken over the town of Derry, so it's going to be rated R." On March 11, 2017, Muschietti, at the SXSW festival, spoke of an element of the pre-production phase in his attempt to keep Skarsgård separated from the film's child actors, wherein the actor wasn't introduced to the young cast until Pennywise's first encounter with the children: "It was something that we agreed on, and that's how it happened. The day that he showed up on the stage, they fucking freaked out. Bill is like, seven-foot high, and I can't describe how scary he looks in person. He's a wiry man, crouching, making sounds, snotting, drooling, speaking in Swedish sometimes. Terrifying." Muschietti stated that the story had been moved forward, with the scenes with the young Losers Club shifting from the 1950s to the 1980s, while also describing their plot as "getting much wider," with new material not in the novel or the 1990 miniseries. However, Muschietti said he hoped it would still strike the same emotional resonance that the book did for him when he first read it: "It's all about trying to hit the core and the heart."

On July 12, 2017, Muschietti, in an interview with French magazine Mad Movies, spoke of when developing the R rated film, in which allowed him to go into very adult themes, which was championed from the people at New Line Cinema. He also stated that, "if you aimed for a PG-13 movie, you had nothing at the end. So we were very lucky that the producers didn't try to stop us. In fact it's more our own moral compass that sometimes showed us that some things lead us in places where we didn't want to go." In the same interview, on July 12, 2017, producer Barbara Muschietti added that there was only one scene that was deemed to be too horrific to feature in the new adaptation, in which she stated, "you won't find the scene where a kid has his back broken and is thrown in the toilets. We thought that the visual translation of that scene had something that was really too much." Muschietti concluded by emphasizing that nothing was removed from the original vision, nor was the violence of any event watered down.

On July 19, 2017, in an interview with Variety's Brent Lang, director Muschietti commented of the monstrous forms that It shall be taking, as well as noting the fact that they'll be very different from the incarnations present in King's story, in which he stated, "The story is the same, but there are changes in the things the kids are scared of. In the book they're children in the 50s, so the incarnations of the monsters are mainly from movies, so it's Wolf Man, the Mummy, Frankenstein, and Dracula. I had a different approach. I wanted to bring out deeper fears, based not only on movie monsters but on childhood traumas." While on the topic of what being the key to a successful horror film, Muschietti concluded by remarking that "Stay true to what scares you. If you don't respect that, you can't scare anyone." Muschietti explained how Skarsgård caught his attention to embody Pennywise, while pointing out that he didn't want the young cast to spend too much time with the actor when not shooting, and encouraged the cast to "maintain distance" between them, wherein Muschietti detailed: We wanted to carry the impact of the encounters to when the cameras were rolling. The first scene where Bill interacted with the children, it was fun to see how the plan worked. The kids were really, really creeped out by Bill. He's pretty intimidating because he's six-four and has all this makeup."

=== Filming ===
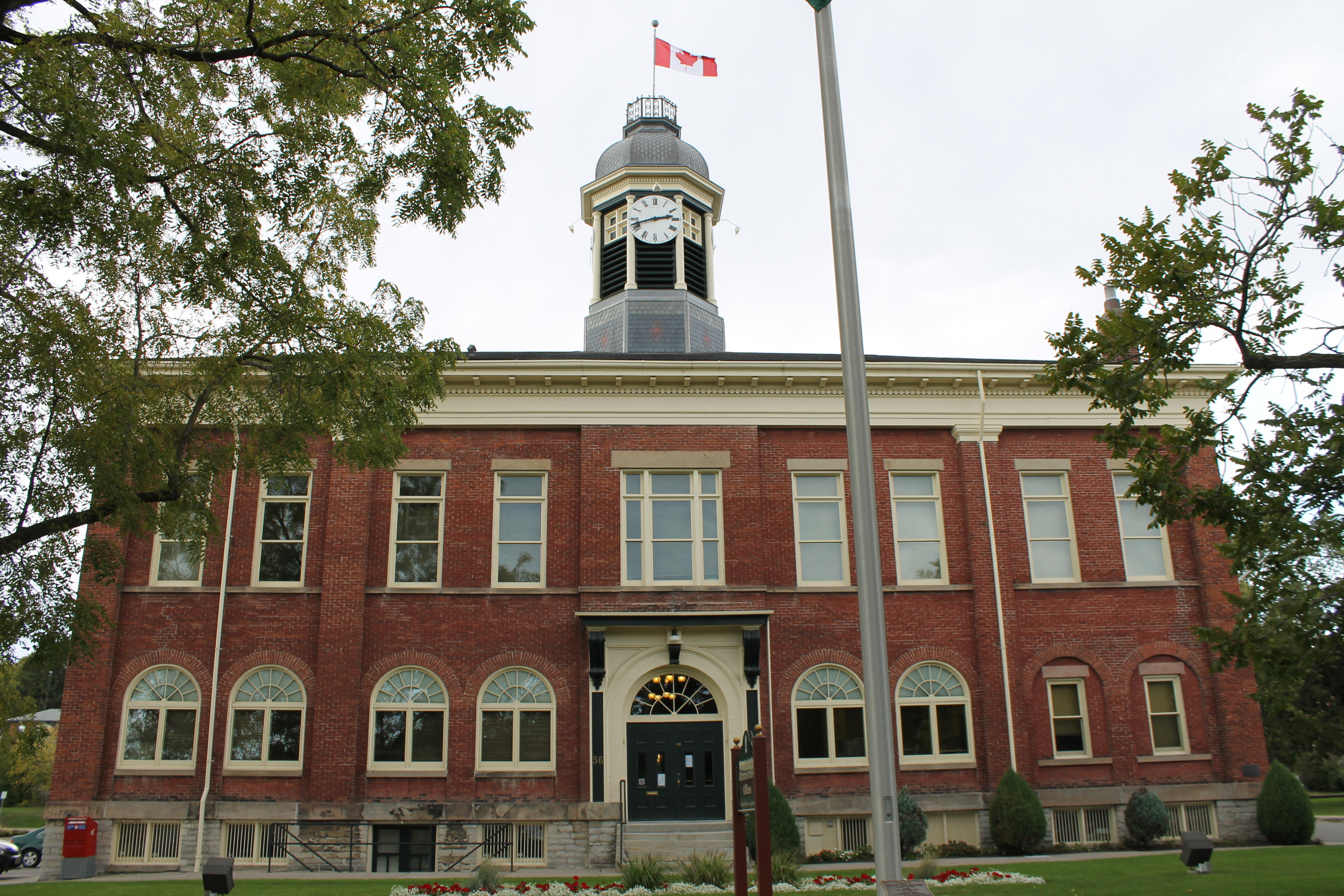
Port Hope had undergone a number of changes to transform it into the town of Derry.

Production designer Mara LePere-Schloop went to Bangor, Maine, to scope out locations including the Thomas Hill Standpipe, the land running alongside the Kenduskeag Stream that in It is called The Barrens, it was confirmed on March 31, 2015, and the Waterworks on the Penobscot River. LePere-Schloop said during her tour that they were hoping to shoot some scenes in the city and possibly get some aerial shots, although currently the leading locations for the majority of filming for the movie are in Yonkers, New York, and in Upstate New York. On May 31, 2016, Third Act Productions was confirmed to have applied to film interior and exterior scenes for It in the municipality of Port Hope, Ontario, with filming slated for various locations around the municipality from July 11, 2016, up until July 18, 2016. Principal photography was confirmed to have begun in Toronto, with an original shooting schedule occurring from June 27 to September 6, 2016.

On July 8, 2016, Port Hope had undergone a number of changes to transform it into Derry; Port Hope Municipal hall is now Derry Public Library, The Port Hope Tourism Centre is now a City of Derry office, Ganaraska Financial is now Montgomery Financial, Gould's Shoes store front on Walton Street changed to a butcher shop, The Avanti Hair Design store front changed to Tony's Barber Shop, an empty storefront at 36 Walton Street changed to Reliance Cleaners, Queen Street Tattoo store front changed to Derry Scoop, a statue of Paul Bunyan was erected in Memorial Park, US flags now hang in place of Canadian flags downtown, and Port Hope Capitol Theatre had appeared to be showing Batman (1989) and Lethal Weapon 2 (1989), thus confirming the film's setting of 1989.

On July 11, 2016, preliminary shooting took place in Port Hope Town Hall, Memorial Park cenotaph, Queen Street between Walton and Robertson streets and the Capitol Theatre. On July 12, 2016, filming occurred between the intersection of Mill and Walton street, Walton Street bridge, and in front and behind 16–22 Walton Street and Port Hope Town Hall. Other shooting locations included Queen Street between Walton and Roberston street, and Memorial Park, on July 13. It was also reported, on July 14, that filming had been set up on the alley between Gould's Shoe's and Avanti Hair Design, and John and Hayward streets. On July 15, 2016, Cavan Street between Highland Drive and Ravine Drive, and Victoria Street South between Trafalgar Street and Sullivan Street. Filming moved to Cavan Street between Highland Drive and Ravine Drive, and Victoria Street South between Trafalgar Street and Sullivan Street on July 15. Filming in Port Hope ended on July 18, at Watson's Guardian Drugs.

Oshawa had been chosen by producers of It as the next filming location, and on July 20, 2016, filming notices were sent out to homes in the area of Eulalie Avenue and James Street, near downtown Oshawa, advising residents that filming of a new adaptation will commence shooting in the area from August 5 up until August 8, 2016. On July 29, 2016, it was announced the crew had been busy on the formerly vacant lot at the dead end of James Street constructing the set, in the form of a dilapidated old house. It was also remarked that the structure is a facade built around scaffolding that will be used for exterior shots. The set is composed of pre-fabricated modules that are being trucked in and put into place by IATSE carpenters.

On July 18, 2016, production crews had arrived in Riverdale, Toronto, with filming beginning at 450 Pape Ave, which is home to a circa 1902 heritage-designated building called Cranfield House, up until August 19, 2016. It was reported, on September 4, that filming had wrapped its shooting in Oshawa, which included the haunted house location, as well as on Court and Fisher streets. Principal photography was confirmed to have ended in Toronto on September 21, 2016, with an altered shooting schedule occurring from June 27 to September 21, 2016, and ultimately with post-production initially beginning on September 14, 2016.

=== Cinematography ===
"One of my main quests is highlighting the eyes of the actors, indeed. I believe that what is captured in the eye goes beyond what can be seen in facial expressions alone. So I always look for a specific way to highlight the eyes of each actor. We did several tests on Pennywise's eyes during camera tests and in the end, I used a flashlight. We tested a lot of different lamps and I chose a particularly powerful one, which gave a very hard light. When Pennywise looks at the kids, I wanted his eyes to look more than his desire to eat them. I liked the idea that, in his eyes, we can see that he knows the fear he inflicts. A bit like when a mother looks hard at her children to scold them. More than just scary eyes, I thought that was what the character needed. So something had to be done to emphasize his look."

— Chung Chung-hoon, on the visual power of lighting eyes in It.

It was photographed with Arri Alexa XT Plus and Alexa Mini in a distributed aspect ratio of 2.39:1 by Chung Chung-hoon. For photographic lens, Chung used Panavision G Series Anamorphic Prime, Angenieux Optimo, and Primo Prime in which Chung stated is used "when Muschietti wants to use a wider lens or needs more frame space for visual effects. The look of the lenses is nearly the same. I mix them a lot and it works well." Cinematographer Chung and director Muschietti's discussions on the lighting of It were of temperature, with Muschietti wanting a hot summer with everyone sweating all the time, while admiring characters with shine on their faces. Both also discussed the balance of making something realistic, but with an element of intrigue that something is not right. Chung mulled over the notion of a period look for It, but ultimately felt the 1980s feel was conveyed through Claude Paré's sets and the work of Janie Bryant, in which Chung stated: "Trying to make a movie set in the 1980s look like the 1980s can be dangerous." Initially he had thought of photographing with 1980s lighting rules and gear, though later feeling it to be superfluous as Muschietti and he were trying to capture a natural look.

Muschietti himself found mainstream 1980s lighting too artificial thus preferred to through windows and bounce off the floor, allowing him to convey a feeling of intimacy with the characters, while admiring the approach of unsettling backlights and soft lights. Chung spoke of his experience on Stoker (2013), which taught him how to light quickly using one source: "I feel lucky because some directors will always say, Can you make more light? But this movie is very naturalistic. My responsibility is to the audience and to tell the story, and if you want this movie to scare people, a natural look is best."

=== Editing ===
"The final is two hours and nine minutes from memory, the first editor's assembly was three hours and forty minutes and then after the director's cut, we were hovering just under the three-hour mark. Then we went through studio notes and audience screenings to further work the cut. Not only are there film rhythms, but there are also filmmaker rhythms. Cutting a film is a marathon, not a sprint. You have to emotionally and physically pace yourself."

— Jason Ballantine, on the final theatrical cut in It.

Film editor Jason Ballantine spoke of the difference in pacing and rhythm that comes with horror in It, in which a story like this was broken up into individual encounters with Pennywise for each of the characters, thus requiring a particular approach. Each segment had to have the appropriate rhythm and setup for the inevitable jump scare, to which he explained: "We were definitely conscious of trying to mix the rhythms up. Each encounter became somewhat more elaborate for the jump-scare in terms of what was shot. The first assembly was massively long. So it did mean that screen time had to be dropped, either through the tightening of existing sequences or even scene deletions." Ballantine also spoke of the key factors when cutting It, which included King's novel, and Tommy Lee Wallace's 1990 miniseries.

In approaching a scene for It, Ballantine mapped out his day-to-day workflow from getting his dailies to sitting down with Muschietti looking through what he's pieced together. Upon receiving the dailies, Ballantine looked through the footage to see if he needs any pickups or reshoots to report back to set, resulting in Pearce Roemer, Elliott Traeger, Ferran Banchs and Daniel Miller to ensure all the footage had been copied over before returning the footage for formatting. From there, Ballantine asks his assistants to arrange the selects in script-order so that he can have a better understanding of the structure, as well as work at a faster pace without worrying about getting lost in the footage. Once Ballantine has a good chunk of the selects in the order he wants, the finished product from that batch will be about a third of the original length.

=== Design ===
==== Pennywise's costume design ====
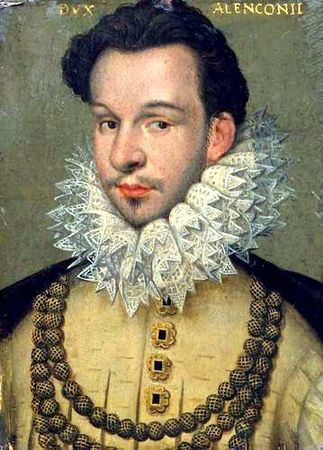
Pennywise's gray costume was partly inspired by the clothing style of the Renaissance.

On August 16, 2016, in an interview with Entertainment Weekly, costume designer Janie Bryant spoke of crafting Pennywise's form-fitting suit and the inspirations to which it drew upon involving a number of bygone times among them the Medieval, Renaissance, Elizabethan, and Victorian eras. Bryant explained that the costume incorporates all these otherworldly past lives, while highlighting the point that Pennywise is a clown from a different time. In designing Pennywise's costume, Bryant included a Fortuny pleating, which gives the costume an almost a crepe-like effect, to which Bryant remarked, "It's a different technique than what the Elizabethans would do. It's more organic, it's more sheer. It has a whimsical, floppy quality to it. It's not a direct translation of a ruff or a whisk, which were two of the collars popular during the Elizabethan period."

Bryant played with multiple eras as a way of reflecting Pennywise's immortality and added a "doll-like quality to the costume." She furthered this by stating "The pants being short, the high waistline of the jacket, and the fit of the costume is a very important element. It gives the character a child-like quality." Bryant spoke of the two puffs off the shoulder, sleeves and again on the bloomers, with her desire to create an "organic, gourd or pumpkin kind of effect", which includes the peplum at the waist, the flared, skirt-like fabric blossoming from below his doublet. She explains, "It helps exaggerate certain parts of the body. The costume is very nipped in the waist and with the peplum and bloomers it has an expansive silhouette." The main color of his costume is a dusky gray, but with a few splashes of color. She concludes the interview by stating, "The pompoms are orange, and then with the trim around the cuffs and the ankles, it's basically a ball fringe that's a combination of orange, red, and cinnamon. It's almost like Pennywise fades into his environment. But there are accents to pull out the definition of the gray silk."

Bryant explained that she wished for Pennywise to have an organic element about himself, with herself paying attention to King's description of Pennywise as being in a silvery gray. For Pennywise, Bryant's manufacturer built 17 different clown costumes to accommodate the action in the film. Muschietti spoke of the fact that the entity of Pennywise has been around for thousands of years, thus from an esthetic standpoint wished to depart from the 20th century clown framework, in which he stated "I think it looks cheap, and it's too related to social events and stuff and circus and stuff. Circus is fine, but I'm more aesthetically attracted to the old time, like the 19th century clown. And given that this guy has been around for centuries, I wondered myself why, why not, having an upgrade that was 1800s?"

==== Production design ====
"One of the main sets that we worked on one of them was an evil house. The evil house had three specific moments there's the exterior, there's the interior, and then the basement, where the well is where Pennywise accesses the sewers and the cisterns where his lair is I also wanted to have this spooky tree looming at the house so we decided to build it until a crew member found this tree, driving to the office here one morning. So we bought the tree from the owner after negotiating."

— Claude Paré, on the construction of 29 Neibolt Street on It.

Production designer Claude Paré commented that apart from 29 Neibolt Street, that the other main component of Muschietti's It were both the sewers and the cistern, to which Muschietti and himself worked every morning for roughly three months observing, looking at the plans and attempting to figure out what was the best pattern for themselves on stages they had access to a rather precise stage, though having to make profit as much as they could, of what they had. Paré discussed about knowing that Muschietti and himself had to have a culvert entrance in The Barrens, somewhere in or around Toronto.

The construction of 29 Neibolt Street was one of the great challenges of the production, with Paré later explaining he wanted the haunted house of the film to be visually strong and in line with the decor of the great films of the horror genre such as the Bates house from Psycho (1960), or the Overlook Hotel of The Shining (1980). Paré worked extensively with Muschietti to imagine a haunted house that unleashes a presence that is discovered to be a character in its own right. The exterior of 29 Neibolt Street was built in Oshawa, Ontario, with the interior scenes being filmed in a former hospice.

Six months after principal photography, Paré built the clown room on a sound-stage at Pinewood Toronto Studios as Muschietti felt the Neibolt Street sequence required more scares to which Paré stated Muschietti had the concept of wanting to have clowns from different eras, in which Paré said: "There were real clowns and fake clowns. There was lots of work put into dressing mannequins and putting some heads on them with masks and wigs and so on. Some of them were real people, so they start moving as you see in the movie." Conceptually, Muschietti himself spoke of how he wished to keep the cistern more grounded and real, instead of going into a world of fantasy: "I decided to do a compelling and surrealistic but still grounded physical place." Paré originally had wished that the sewers were composed of bricks, due to it being of more period-accuracy, however, the cost was deemed too great thus his team and himself decided to go with formed concrete which was constructed with a mixture of planks and plywood sheets. Paré spoke of the special attention paid to the water drainage for the sewer, as well as the water marks that he said echoed those of New Orleans after Hurricane Katrina.

Paré later explained that his team looked at the location, with them later having kids climb up and down to which later resulted in the construction of the well on the stage, which connects Pennywise's tunnel, giving access to the tunnels, which in turn gives access to the cistern: "which is the giant set that we're shooting now, and in which Pennywise has his wagon and on top of which there's a pile of all the clothes and toys of the dead kids over the many centuries." The vortex of dead children was also a creation of Muschietti and Paré, with floating being a "metaphor for dying," according to Muschietti. Paré had to get down to logistics with conversations taking place about how many bodies would be floating, as well as the speed at which the children were spinning around, with Paré remarking: "We didn't want to go over a year worth of kids, because all the kids that would have been dead would have been eaten in the 27 years that Pennywise was away So the kids of that era are basically a reserve for the next 27 years."

==== Sound design ====
Chris Jenkins and Michael Keller were sound engineers for the film, tasked with sound mixing, while sound editor Victor Ray Ennis supervised the process. Director Muschietti was clear unto the sound engineers about every aspect of the soundscape, especially when it came to dynamics. During the final mix there were moments when Muschietti conducted the peaks and valleys of the sound design and score, to which sound designer Paul Hackner stated, "It was in these moments when perceived silence, created by small transients such as water drips, foot creaks, or actual silence, were revealed, resulting in a dynamic mix."

=== Visual effects ===
"Basically what they did was bring in all the stunt performers into a gym, and they learned the choreography and they motion-captured this. We built really quick CG assets for all the characters, including Pennywise, and we planned out all his transformations and the action. In the end, you could have the shape of both characters, but both of them could have the textures of one or the other. With some simulated effects we'd be able to balance all of that out and really time it to what [Muschietti] was looking for.

— Arnaud Brisebois, on the showdown with Pennywise in It."

Nicholas Brooks was the overall visual effects supervisor and the visual effects company Rodeo FX worked on most of the visual effects on It, completing 95 shots for the film. Rodeo FX was tasked with creating a number of CG assets to either enhance or even completely replace Bill Skarsgård's Pennywise, amongst others being the giant abandoned cistern within the heart of Pennywise's lair. Both from a technical and creative standpoint, the various shapes created for Pennywise presented a large challenge for Rodeo FX's modeling, rigging and creature FX teams. The visual effects company Atomic Arts were initially brought in to create the paper boat sequence for It, which covers much of the first trailers, to which all of the shots were used in the final film and the company were awarded many more shots in Muschietti's piece. Atomic Arts highlighted the challenges in creating the paper boat sequence, as Muschietti and Chung shot it in bright sunshine. Amalgamated Dynamics worked on the special makeup effects on It.

Producer Barbara Muschietti stated that It would use computer-generated imagery as a support tool in every circumstance; never as an element standing on its own in regard to its relationship with practical effects, to which she stated, "In every film, in this day and age, there is some CG, but we will use it as little as possible." Andy Muschietti spoke of It containing a small amount of CGI, with much of Pennywise being Skarsgård and his face: "The rest it's a shape-shifting monster, and I wanted to bring that to the screen, when he's basically trying to throw everything he has at them.", while signifying the importance of design and execution in the eternal discussion of practical versus CG.

Company 3's Stephen Nakamura collaborated with Muschietti to color grade It, completing the film's digital intermediate in Blackmagic DaVinci Resolve at EFILM, spoke of the concepts about the look of Muschietti's film that evolved during production, and while continuing it in the DI, the idea that a lot of the film takes place in fairly high-key situations, not the kind of dark, shadowy world some horror films exist in. Nakamura said, "It's a period piece. It's set in a small town that sort of looks like this pleasant place to be, but all this wild stuff is happening!" On the work connected on Pennywise during the digital intermediate, Nakamura spoke of having alpha channel mattes cut around Pennywise's eyes for every shot he's in, while using the color corrector to make changes to his eyes:" Other moments Nakamura mentioned was the battle between the kids and Pennywise underground, wherein the setting shifts the story into darkness, with such an effect working powerfully in the 14-footlambert standard digital cinema version and even more so in the 31-footlambert HDR pass which was completed for the film's Dolby Cinema version, in contrast to Nakamura's work on Tomorrowland (2015), with him explaining: "In the Dolby Cinema version, the scene can feel significantly darker but also contain more detail. You're pushing more light through the images overall and the contrast ratio is massive so dark scenes can be even darker but we can hold onto every scary detail. It's a very effective tool to have for this kind of movie."

== Themes ==
It is a loss of innocence story with fear, mortality and survivalist themes. Muschietti remarked of the film's elements of coming of age and issues of mortality, wherein he states such themes are prevalent in King's book, though that in reality these occur in a more progressive way, "There's a passage in It that reads, 'Being a kid is learning how to live and being an adult is learning how to die.' There's a bit of a metaphor of that and it just happens in a very brutal way, of course."

He also mentioned the characterization of Pennywise's survivalist attitude, and a passage in the novel which inspired Muschietti, was when Bill wonders if Pennywise is eating children simply because that's what we're told monsters do, in stating, "It's a tiny bit of information, but that sticks with you so much. Maybe it is real as long as children believe in it. And in a way, Pennywise's character is motivated by survival. In order to be alive in the imagination of children, he has to keep killing." While Muschietti acknowledges it to be a horror film, he, too, felt that it's not simply just that: "It's a story of love and friendship and a lot of other beautiful emotions."

== Influences ==
"We were fans of horror at very early age; we were exposed to horror movies very early in life so there was this addiction we carried very early, and then came Stephen King. We're very big fans of his. He's my literary hero. It all started with Pet Sematary but then It came along and for me, it was a mind-blowing experience. My first reaction, when offered the opportunity to direct this movie, was basically to go back to my emotional experience reading the book when I was a child, and translating that into a movie that would blow my mind as an adult. Those were the big ideas when approaching the making of this movie."

— Andy Muschietti on King's influence in his approach to It.

Director Andy Muschietti said influences on It included the "visceral" authority of horror cinema: The Howling (1981), The Thing (1982), and Near Dark (1987). He also spoke of the influential contributions of Clive Barker and John Carpenter. He cited the influence of Steven Spielberg in "the way of understanding story and filmmaking, because he has such a strong emotional element to all his stories.", while crediting Stephen King, alongside directors such as [Carpenter] and Joe Dante. He also sought to emulate the whimsical and nostalgic perspective on childhood, while providing a balance with a much harsher viewpoint. He stated: "The movie, the tone of the movie regarding what childhood is and experiences of childhood is pretty wide. There's the Spielberg moments and there's the Larry Clark moments."

Muschietti spoke of bringing certain cultural experience within the genre to It, in which he highlights his devotion to horror coming from international horror films and literature, to which he stated, "there's other sides to my storytelling influences that comes from of course Jorge Luis Borges and Adolfo Bioy Casares and writers like Horacio Quiroga But you know, my love for horror comes from movies that were mainly English language." Muschietti based his portrayal of bullying in It as an homage to personal experience in the '80s with bullies, through the pure cruelty of Henry Bowers, where he speaks of them being very mean and very expressionist in their art of bullying, which is an aspect he wanted to explore. The sequence with Judith, the woman in the portrait whose form It assumes to terrify Stan, was based on Muschietti's experience with the paintings of Amedeo Modigliani, one of which hung in Muschietti's childhood home, and which he found frightening, interpreting Modigliani's stylisation as monstrous.

Skarsgård spoke of Heath Ledger as being an inspiration, while contrasting between Ledger's Joker and his Pennywise, in which he stated: "I think the biggest difference between Pennywise and the Joker character or at least Heath Ledger's interpretation is that he's far more based in reality." He also sought to not attempt to emulate the performance in The Dark Knight (2008), he remarked: "I deliberately tried to make mine different because it's such a clear, iconic performance so I wanted to stray away from it as far as possible." Skarsgård studied animal programs to assist him in developing Pennywise's physical behavior, in which he zeroed in on the energy of hyenas and the lower-lip scowl of bears as touchstones. While speaking of the inexplicable nature of Pennywise, Skarsgård stated: "Ledger's Joker is rooted in the real; you can break down the psychology. But Pennywise is not a real person." Skarsgård explained that Pennywise's succinct shuffles, whilst attacking and lunging toward his targets, were inspired by his little brother, Ossian, to which he stated: "I don't know if you've seen kids run like this, but they move their arms way too fast, and it looks really, really funny. And I just loved the way my brother ran as a kid. It was just out of sync. So I incorporated that into the character, and you get this really explosive effect. It's really unsettling when it happens."

In approaching the story, Barbara Muschietti referred to Stephen King's It (1986) as "our bible", while thinking it to be interesting to respect the proper chronology, with the Muschietti siblings going into the casting process with the book in mind. Muschietti spoke of using Fukunaga and Palmer's original screenplay as a basis, however, "skewed it in a different direction", to which her brother stated: "It was a good script, in terms of characters and the depth of characters and such, but it didn't really tap into one of the most attractive traits of the character, which was the shape-shifting qualities." Screenwriter Gary Dauberman said influences on It included Stand by Me (1986), while stating: "that's one of my favorite stories so that's an element I wanted to preserve because it's there in the source material. Andy wanted to preserve it and really make that a part of It because I think those moments of levity provide a great contrast to those darker moments, or makes the darker moments feel all that much darker." Dauberman also spoke of the inspiration Muschietti had upon him, as well as director James Wan, while stating that: "a lot of 80s horror movies and such helped to bring that sort of aesthetic and sensibility."

== Music ==
On March 23, 2017, Benjamin Wallfisch was announced as the composer of It's score. Wallfisch stated that Jerry Goldsmith, John Williams, Alan Silvestri, as well as Dave Grusin's composition for The Goonies (1985) were largely influential in the score of It, as he felt so passionate about those "big thematic style of scoring", albeit at the same time wishing to go beyond the idea that it would be a purely orchestral and adventurous score. According to Wallfisch, he had to develop a theme for Pennywise which included finding and creating music that could infect all the other melodies as there are several themes in the film but the Pennywise score is a very quiet and whispered childlike tune using very high strings. Wallfisch spoke of Pennywise's second theme, inspired by Skarsgård's portrayal, in which he used the old children's song "Oranges and Lemons", which had always disturbed him as a child: "We knew we wanted some kind of children's song to signify Pennywise's strange and demented inner monologue. I also very subtly use certain melodic fragments from it in other themes, for example the piano music that opens and closes the movie."

== Release ==
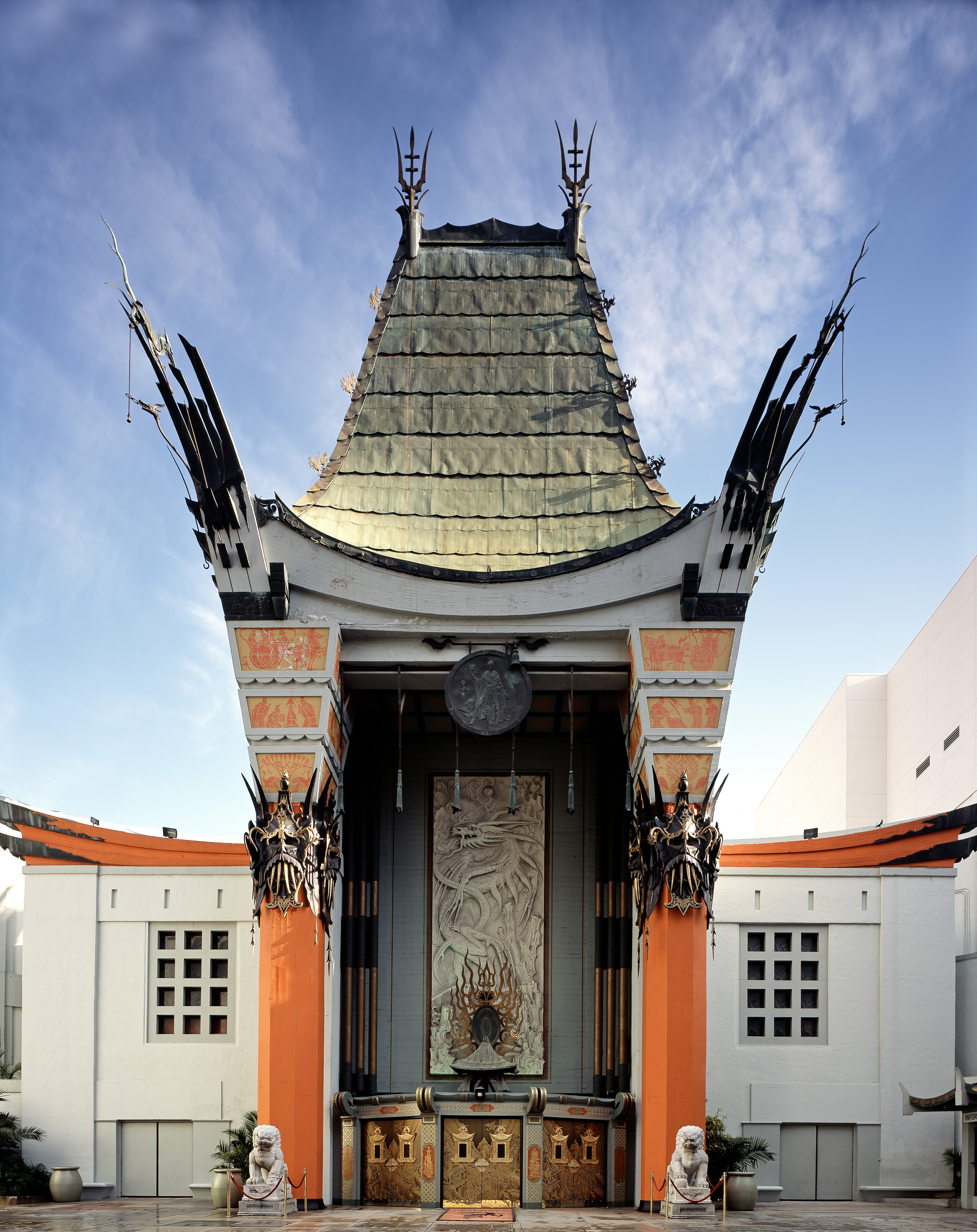
Grauman's Chinese Theatre in Hollywood, California, hosted the world premiere showing of It.

It premiered at Grauman's Chinese Theatre, on September 5, 2017, in Hollywood, California, after screening as a preview at BFI Southbank in London, England on September 4, 2017, while being selected to screen as the opening-film of the Fantasy Filmfest in Munich, Germany on September 6. It was released in 28 countries, including European nations (such as Russia and Netherlands), Middle Eastern nations (such as Israel and UAE), Latin America/Caribbean nations (such as Brazil and Panama), Australia, and New Zealand on September 7; 15 countries including the United Kingdom, and additional European, and Asian countries, including North America on September 8. On September 9, the film screened at the Deauville American Film Festival in Deauville, France, where it opened in the official sidebar section, The Premiers. It was selected to screen at Down Town Taito International Comedy Film Festival in Tokyo, Japan on September 17. The film was selected as the opening-film of the Slash Film Festival in Vienna, Austria on September 21, ahead of its final bow in Italy on October 19, and in Japan on November 3, 2017. On March 7, 2017, the title of the film was announced by Stephen King as Part 1 – The Losers' Club. On September 8, It opened in a total of 615 IMAX openings globally, of which 389 were in North America.

A few days before its release, Variety reported the film broke Fandango's pre-sales record to become the top horror pre-seller of all-time, eclipsing Paranormal Activity 3 (2011), as well as setting the record as the site's top pre-seller among September releases, beating Sully (2016). Variety also reported that MovieTickets.com stated that It accounted for 54.4% of all tickets sold through September 6, with It selling 8x as many tickets as Annabelle: Creation (2017) did through two days prior to opening, 6x The Conjuring 2's (2016) totals with two days to opening, and 15x that of The Purge: Election Year (2016) at the same point in the sales cycle. TheWrap reported the film broke Fandango's sales record to become the top horror second-week-seller of all-time, eclipsing Get Out (2017) by 2x as much.

=== Marketing ===
The official website for It debuted on August 31, 2016, introducing a marketing campaign and interactive layout to promote the film. The website streamed the third trailer as well as containing a gallery, videos, and the 8-bit game "It: Enter the Sewer". On January 31, 2016, Muschietti, on his Instagram, posted a sketch that is thought to be the precursor to Pennywise's final look, to celebrate the pre-production getting underway. Beginning from July 11, 2016, Muschietti posted a variety of missing person posters of children within the Derry area, including Betty Ripsom, Richie Tozier, Paul Greenberg, Jonathan Chan, and Tania McGowan.

Muschietti shared a photo of a missing person poster featuring Richie Tozier. The poster lists all of the character's information, as part of It's marketing campaign.

The first official image for It debuted on July 13, 2016 to promote It, introducing the first look at Skarsgård's Pennywise The Dancing Clown, as well as an interview with Skarsgård, conducted by Anthony Breznican. Thomas Freeman of Maxim wrote that "Skarsgard in full, terrifying costume, he's clearly got what it takes to fill King's most macabre, nightmare-inducing creation." Chris Eggertsen of HitFix responded positively stating the image to be "an appropriately macabre look that doesn't deviate too radically from the aesthetic of Curry's Pennywise dare I say, a more creepily seductive look to Skarsgard's version that was absent from Curry's interpretation."

On August 16, 2016, Entertainment Weekly released the full costume image of Skarsgård's Pennywise to promote It, including an interview with costume designer Janie Bryant. JoBlo.com's Damion Damaske was fond of the new design, though was understanding others being dismissive of it. Damaske also stated, "One of the chief complaints is that it looked too automatically scary, and that one of the reasons Pennywise chooses his guise is to trick and lure children." Dave Trumbore of Collider noted that "This one's going to divide some folks. It's nowhere near as baggy or colorful as the one Tim Curry donned but the new version certainly seems to have a lot more thought and intent behind its creation." Jonathan Barkan of Bloody Disgusting called the image one of "drawing attention and curiosity". Barkan then stated "I don't know if it's morbid curiosity or hopeful wishes but the overall response to his face and makeup seemed to be quite positive!"

On March 9, 2017, Neha Aziz of SXSW announced that Muschietti is set to appear at a screening event titled, Face Your Fears, to share footage from It, while discussing his inspirations and influences. On March 11, 2017, New Line Cinema showcased its promotion of It, by releasing a teaser trailer and a scene at the South by Southwest festival. Trace Thurman of Bloody Disgusting heralded the trailer: "It was maybe 90 seconds of footage, but it was a damn impressive 90 seconds of footage. As far as teasers go, it's one of the best that I've ever seen." Dread Central's Jonathan Barkan praised the scene, and stated, "The kids are clearly very adept at working off one another. There was a chemistry between the four that was wonderful to see and it's obvious that Muschietti worked very hard to ensure they were believable." Eric Vespe of Ain't It Cool News remarked that "this one scene shows us the key traits of the bulk of the members of the Losers Club within one sequence. I loved it for that reason."

On March 28, 2017, New Line released a 139-second teaser trailer to promote It, following a 19-second trailer and the official theatrical release poster the prior day, and for exhibitors at CinemaCon. Tom Philip of GQ heralded the trailer and its tonality by stating: "Dark corners everywhere and a pervading sense of absolute doom, even in the scenes where the creature isn't looming. That projector scene! Christ!" Michael Gold of The New York Times praised the trailer, and stated: "There's always tension in the sustained string chords of the soundtrack, and it imbues everything with suspense and darkness." Wired's Brian Raftery spoke most highly of the trailer, to which he stated, "The teaser's scariest moment features no gore or gotcha-ness; instead, it involves a misfiring slide-projector and a barely discernible clown-grin. Nothing in the It trailer feels like a cheap thrill, which is all the more thrilling." IndieWire's William Earl reacted positively to the "top-notch" production design of Derry, Maine within the trailer. The trailer reached 197 million views in its first 24 hours, setting a new record as the trailer with the most views in one day. In addition to dethroning The Fate of the Furious (2017), the trailer numbers surpassed previous records held by Beauty and the Beast (2017), Fifty Shades Darker (2017), and Star Wars: The Force Awakens (2015).

On May 7, 2017, a second teaser trailer, this one lasting 137 seconds, was shown at the MTV Movie & TV Awards in Los Angeles, California, to promote It, with the new preview showcasing a snippet of the film where the "Losers' Club" search for Pennywise's many victims. Daniel Kreps of Rolling Stone felt snippet of the film "was initially similar to Stand By Me (1986), with the Losers' Club playfully bantering about "gray water" A series of scary images soon follow before the trailer ends on Pennywise doing unimaginable balloon tricks to lure a victim." Matt Goldberg of Collider.com praised the trailer, and stated: "This new trailer really plays up the kids' role and their fears. It's a smart move, because if a sequel does come along, it's going to be looking at the kids as adults, so that aspect will be lost." Digital Spy's Jack Tomlin spoke of the clarity in that director Muschietti's film will carry on down the "creepy as hell" vibe he gave the first trailer. On July 13, 2017, Entertainment Weekly released a collection of new images and concept art such as Pennywise's lair to promote It, including commentary from director Andy Muschietti. On July 19, 2017, New Line Cinema showcased its promotion of It, by releasing three reels of footage at San Diego Comic-Con, before an advanced screening of Annabelle: Creation (2017). On July 20, 2017, as part of Warner Bros.'s marketing campaign, an It-inspired virtual reality installation was brought to San Diego Comic-Con entitled FLOAT: A Cinematic VR Experience, which was located at the Interactive Zone across from Petco Park until July 23.

On July 27, 2017, Warner Bros. unveiled a third trailer to promote It. Kaitlyn Tiffany of The Verge wrote that "the final 20 seconds of this trailer is a montage of nightmares, including a toilet full of blood" Mike Miller of People of the trailer felt that "One of the more disturbing new scenes revealed in the trailer introduces a room full of menacing clowns of all shapes and sizes." Ryan Parker of The Hollywood Reporter wrote "This trailer is wonderful in that I felt totally creeped out afterward, which is a nice change of pace This trailer, however, makes my skin crawl, which is what King is the master of doing in his books." On August 11, 2017, a four-minute extended footage reel of It was attached to prints of Annabelle: Creation (2017), as part of It's marketing campaign, which included an introduction by Stephen King, one month before release. John Squires of Bloody Disgusting described Skarsgard as "commanding the screen as Pennywise, turning in a performance that's likely going to remind many of the next level believably of Heath Ledger as the Joker in The Dark Knight (2008)." Kofi Outlaw of PopCulture wrote that "Skarsgård excels at portraying Pennywise as thing not of this world, that is only pretending to take the shape of something comprehensible to the mind All in all, it seems like we'll get a very good performance from Skarsgård." On August 14, through to September 10, Warner Bros. and New Line Cinema announced a haunted house experience called The IT Experience: Neibolt House, located at Hollywood Blvd. and Vine Street, which featured immersive film-inspired scenes complete with authentic set props, to promote It.

== Reception ==
=== Box office ===
It grossed $327.5 million in the United States and Canada, and $375.3 million in other territories, for a worldwide total of $702.8 million, against a production budget of $35–40 million. The $123.4 million earned worldwide in its opening weekend was the 29th-largest of all time in the United States and Canada. Deadline Hollywood calculated the net profit of the film to be $293.7 million, accounting for production budgets, P&A, talent participation and other costs, against box office grosses and ancillary revenues from home media, placing it fifth on their list of 2017's "Most Valuable Blockbusters".

==== Theatrical run ====
With It playing in 4,103 theaters, it set the record for most venues for an R-rated film, surpassing Logan's (2017) 4,071 theaters, as well as the record for the largest opening for an R-rated horror movie, improving on Alien: Covenant's (2017) 3,761 theaters. The film made $13.5 million from Thursday night previews, setting the record for highest amount for an R-rated film, (besting Deadpool's (2016) $12.6 million), an R-rated horror film (besting Paranormal Activity 3's $8 million), a September release, as well as the biggest Thursday preview for any of King's adaptations. The film opened to $51 million on its first day, breaking previous records for the highest-opening R-rated, non-sequel horror film (besting The Conjuring's (2013) $41 million), and the highest-opening Stephen King movie (besting 1408's (2007) $20 million). The $51 million also gave It the biggest single-day opening for an R-rated movie of all time, dethroning Deadpool's $46 million, while nearly eclipsing Paranormal Activity 3's entire weekend gross of $52.6 million, which was the highest opening weekend gross for an R-rated horror film. Muschietti's It went on to open to $124 million, setting the records for largest opening weekend for both a September and a fall release (besting Hotel Transylvania 2's (2015) $48.4 million) and (besting Gravity's (2013) $55 million), while eclipsing the biggest adjusted September opening (besting Rush Hour's (1998) $62 million) and the biggest adjusted October opening (besting Scary Movie 3's (2003) $71 million).

Other records set by the film include the largest opening weekend for an R-rated horror film (besting Paranormal Activity 3's (2011) $52.6 million), the biggest theatrical debut in horror movie history (besting Hannibal's (2001) $58 million), the biggest non-holiday/long weekend R-rated debut of all time (besting Logan's $88 million), the cheapest movie ever to top $100 million in its debut weekend (besting The Twilight Saga: New Moon's (2009) $50m budget), becoming the second-biggest debut for an R-rated film behind Deadpool's ($132.4 million), the biggest opening for an R-rated movie based upon a book (besting Fifty Shades of Grey's (2015) $85 million), and the third-highest opening of 2017 (behind Beauty and the Beast and Guardians of the Galaxy Vol. 2), while joining The Passion of the Christ (2004) as the only film under $40 million to enter the biggest openers list. Variety noted that the film's opening weekend could have been even greater if not for Hurricane Irma shutting down nearly 50% of Florida's theaters, a state that typically accounts for 5% of the country's box office grosses. The film broke the record for the highest Monday that the month of September has ever seen with $8.8 million (besting The Sixth Sense's (1999) $6.37 million), the biggest Monday ever for an R-rated horror and/or scary movie, while breaking the record for the highest Tuesday that the month of September has ever seen with $11.4 million (besting Sully's $4.8 million), the highest Tuesday for a horror film (besting The Conjuring's $5.6 million), and the second-biggest single Tuesday for an R-rated horror film (behind The Omen's (2006) $12.6 million). The film went on to bring in $7.9 million to attain the biggest Wednesday in September history and the biggest Wednesday for an R-rated horror movie, while becoming the record holder for any horror film on a Thursday in September with $7.2 million.

The film became the highest-grossing Stephen King horror film ever in North America and worldwide, even adjusted for inflation (besting The Shining's (1980) $145 million). It went on to open to $60 million, setting the records for the largest second opening weekend for a September release, while also pushing the domestic total to $218.7 million to become the highest-grossing September film of all time (besting Crocodile Dundee's (1984) $174.8 million). The film went on to become the highest-grossing film ever between the Labor Day-to-November frame. Muschietti's It went on to earn $236.3 million domestically, setting the records for highest-grossing horror film of all time in unadjusted domestic gross (besting The Exorcist's (1973) $232.9 million), the highest-grossing horror in unadjusted worldwide gross (besting The Exorcist's $441 million), while becoming the biggest Stephen King adaptation ever in North America for adjusted gross (besting The Green Mile's (1999) $233 million). In its third weekend, It was dethroned by newcomer Kingsman: The Golden Circle, finishing second at the box office with $30 million. On September 28, it passed the $500 million mark becoming the 176th film to do so, while becoming second-biggest movie ever starring a clown behind The Dark Knight (2008). In its fourth week, the film initially made a projected gross of $17.3 million, apparently retaking its top spot at the box office ahead of Kingsman: The Golden Circle ($17 million). However, the actual results had the film finishing in second by a gross of $16.90 million to Kingsman's $16.93 million, while beating out newcomer American Made (2017) ($16.8 million). The film continued to hold well in the following weeks, making $10 million and $6.1 million in its fifth and sixth weeks, finishing a respective third and fourth at the box office.

==== International run ====
Internationally, the film was released on approximately 10,560 screens. By September 10, It opened in 46 markets, breaking opening first day records in various key countries. It grabbed $16.1 million on its opening day, bringing its cumulative gross to $25.7 million, debuting at first place in virtually all the markets. It broke opening day records for a horror film in the United Kingdom ($4.6 million), Brazil ($1.9 million), Russia ($1.3 million), Australia ($1.1 million), Spain ($1 million), Holland ($270,000) and in 5 other countries across Eastern Europe. Other markets which generated large opening days were South Korea ($554,000), and the United Arab Emirates ($360,000). IMAX generated $10 million globally which makes it Warner Bros.' best ever worldwide September play, while also becoming IMAX's best opening in any September in history.

After the nine days, It had a total gross of $152.6 million from 10,560 screens in 56 markets, while dominating Mexico ($13.85 million) on 4,300 screens, while breaking various records in the market. As of September 24, the largest markets outside of the United States and Canada were the UK ($34.5 million), Mexico ($21.1 million), Russia ($16.6 million), Australia ($14.9 million) and Brazil ($14.5 million), with new record breaking opening in France ($6.3 million) and Argentina ($4.1 million). The film opened in Germany ($11.6 million) and Greece ($756,000), breaking records for Wednesday night previews, the biggest opening for a horror film, and the top Warner Bros. film thus far in their respective markets. The film's largest markets were the United Kingdom ($42.5 million), Germany ($35.4 million), Mexico ($27.6 million), France ($20.2 million) and Japan ($19.2 million).

==== Commercial analysis ====
In North America, It was released alongside Home Again, 9/11, The Good Catholic, and Gun Shy, and Deadline Hollywood reported a projected gross of around $50 million in its opening weekend. However, many analysts considered that the movie would overperform ever since the release of the trailer post-CinemaCon.

Shawn Robbins and Alex Edghill of BoxOffice, on July 14, originally projected Muschietti's It to earn $40 million on a domestic total of $100 million, to which on August 11, a fifteen-percent increased the projection to $46 million on a domestic total of $115 million. On August 25, Robbins and Edghill suggested that It will earn $60 million on a domestic total of $150 million, whilst increasing their previous predication by seventeen-percent on September 1, to a $70 opening weekend on a domestic total of $175 million within 4,000 locations stating that "It continues to trend in unprecedented territory for a horror release". A few days before It's release, Shawn Robbins and Alex Edghill increased the estimated projection from $70 million to $81 million on in its opening weekend, with a statement later suggesting the forecast of $81 million to potentially be low.

Reports in August 2017 from Forbes's Scott Mendelson predicted the film may enter the record books for the horror movie genre, with a realistic prediction of It opening over or under of The Conjuring (2013) and The Conjuring 2's (2016) $40 million opening weekend, though Mendelson stated that Fifty Shades Darker's (2017) $46.6 million opening, and $114.4 million domestic finish may just be at the lower end of expectations. Mendelson later stated that while It will break the record for biggest opening weekend for a non-sequel R-rated horror movie, held by The Conjuring (2013) at $41.8 million, it may snag one of the biggest gaps between first newbie and second place newbie ever, a record is held by the opening weekends of Star Wars: The Force Awakens (2015) and Alice in Wonderland (2010), with him concluding "It's not beyond the mountains of madness that It could snag $77m all by itself." Brent Lang of Variety stated that initial tracking suggested that Muschietti's It is on pace to open to more than $50 million. Jeremy Fuster of TheWrap reported that It could attain as much as $60 million in its opening weekend, a figure that would give It the biggest theatrical debut in horror movie history, surpassing Hannibal's (2001) $58 million, as well as the biggest opening for any film released in September, surpassing Hotel Transylvania 2's (2015) $48.4 million. Brandon Katz of Observer stated that if It lives up to its $60 million prediction, it could be looking at a worldwide total somewhere around $450 million. In August, co-editor-in-chief of Deadline.com Michael Fleming suggested that the film could exceed a $70 million opening weekend, and even hit $80 million at the box office. C.S. Strowbridge of The Numbers estimated that the film would be a box office success, suggesting Muschietti's film to be the biggest hit of the month and dominating the box office in its respective weekend of release. Strowbridge stated that if the buzz of reception increases then a $60 million opening weekend and $160 million total becomes more likely, with Strowbridge remarking that It may even become the all-time highest-grossing film released in September, a record currently held by Crocodile Dundee (1986). Strowbridge remarked that Annabelle: Creation may lose over 1,000 theaters the day It comes out. By the week of its release, estimates were raised to $60–70 million in domestic ticket sales.

Box office analyst Gitesh Pandya spoke of It's firepower in which it had earned very good reviews from film critics, as well as the taking-into-account of the historical lucrativeness for horror movies during the October period, with Pandya suggesting a $62 million opening weekend. On September 5, Brad Brevet of Box Office Mojo stated that It film had arrived at the right time, whilst arriving on the heels of the two worst weekends of the year thus far. He also stated that he's forecasting an $85 million opening for It, with anything higher not being a surprise." The Hollywood Reporter reported that Warner Bros.' insiders are being more cautious by stating the figure $60-$65 million, noting the sluggish marketplace, the fact that September has never been known for huge openings, as well as It's R rating. Anita Busch and Anthony D'Alessandro of Deadline.com reported that Muschietti's It could run past $90 million, with some trackers looking at $100 million in the film's opening weekend.

=== Critical response ===
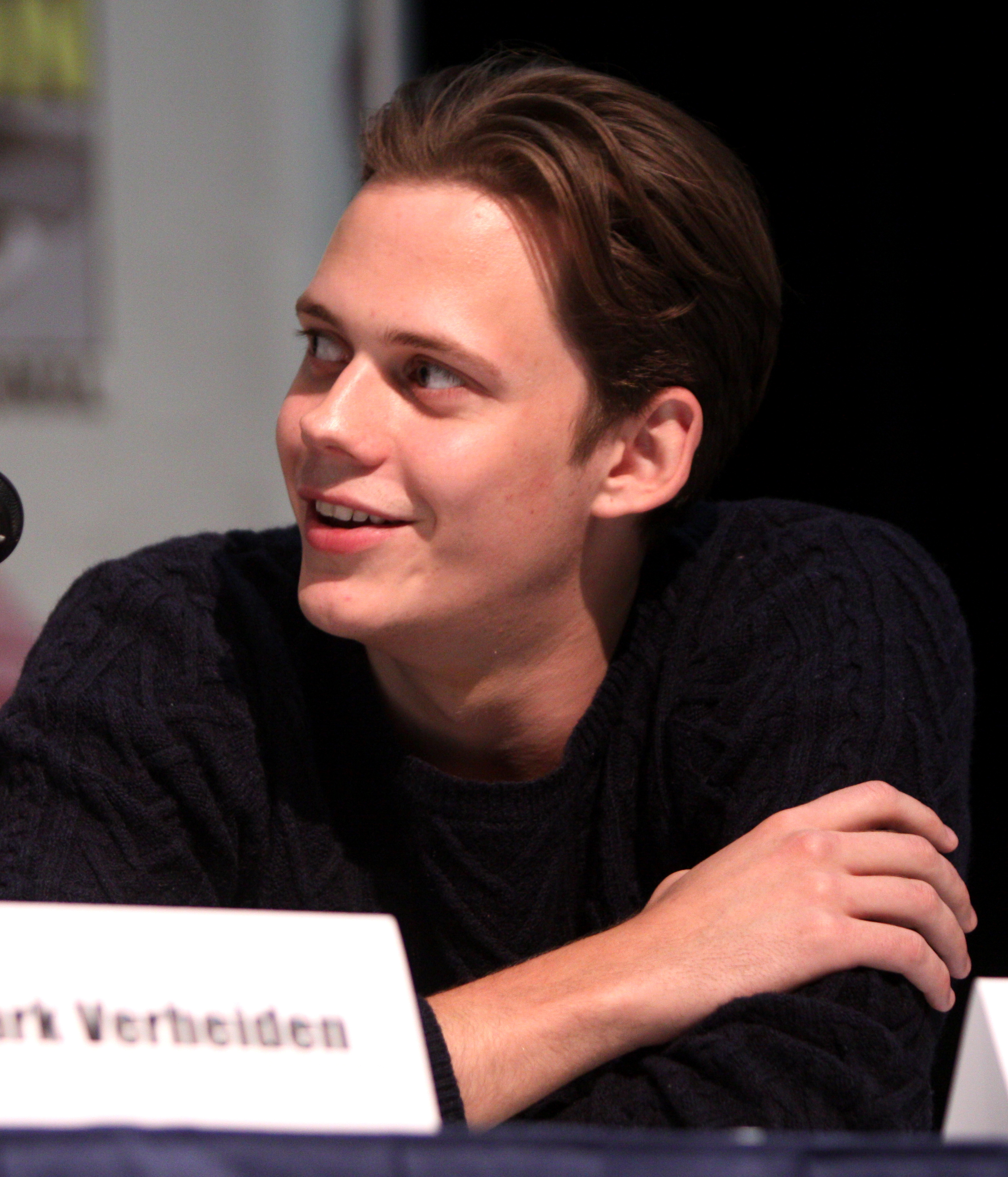
Critics particularly praised Bill Skarsgård's portrayal of Pennywise.

It received praise for its performances, direction, screenplay, cinematography, and musical score. On review aggregator Rotten Tomatoes, the film holds an approval rating of 85% based on 387 reviews, with an average rating of 7.30/10. The site's critical consensus reads, "Well-acted and fiendishly frightening with an emotionally affecting story at its core, It amplifies the horror in Stephen King's classic story without losing touch with its heart." Metacritic, another review aggregator, assigned the film a weighted average score of 69 out of 100, based on 49 critics, indicating "generally favorable" reviews. Audiences polled by CinemaScore gave the film an average grade of "B+" on an A+ to F scale, while those at PostTrak gave it an overall positive score of 85% and a 64% "definite recommend".

Vanity Fair, Salon, and IndieWire, among others, pegged it as an Oscar contender. Sinead Brennan of RTÉ, awarding four out of five stars, described It as a "film that is just beautiful to look at, while you sit on the edge of your seat waiting for the next scare." She praised the performances, cinematography, and production value, whilst speaking of Skarsgård as "chilling perfection", whose "manic energy and presence which brings a level of unease and intensity to proceedings that is just incredible.", with Brennan feeling Skarsgård's performance was "career defining", and deserving to be considered for awards season.

Ben Child of The Guardian described Skarsgård as a "revelation", while stating: "There may be something of Heath Ledger's Joker, and a Depression-era New Yoik gangsterism to Skarsgård's vowels, but his ability to go from quiet, leering menace to nightmarish attack mode in a split second is a big part of the appeal." Richard Roeper of The Chicago Sun-Times spoke most highly of Skarsgård's performance, with him writing "Skarsgård's Pennywise shows up only sparingly, and that's a wise choice. To be sure, it's a strong performance, and the clown is a worthy successor to all the great scary clowns in movie history" Peter Travers of Rolling Stone wrote: "That evil clown Pennywise, a spectacularly scary Bill Skarsgård, is the stuff of nightmares." San Francisco Chronicle's Peter Hartlaub granted the film a maximum score of four stars, stating that "Muschietti understands the Spielberg-ian rule, that creating a recognizable and convincing backdrop makes the supernatural thing in the foreground feel tangible and believable", while praising Skarsgård and the young cast's performances. Ryan Porter of The Toronto Star felt Wolfhard to be "charming in what could have been just another nerd role, proving his breakout performance on Stranger Things was more than beginner's luck." In his review for The St. Louis Post-Dispatch, Calvin Wilson wrote, "Muschietti conjures an atmosphere of dread that allows for the occasional burst of humor." He continued by praising the performances of Muschietti's young cast, citing Lillis whose "spunky charisma brings to mind Scarlett Johansson and Emma Stone".

Maria Sciullo of The Pittsburgh Post-Gazette wrote: "Dylan Grazer and Lillis are standouts among a pretty good bunch of child actors." Tasha Robinson of The Verge praised all seven of the central children, saying each are "well-cast and give strong performances" in the film. She also said Ray Taylor's portrayal of Ben Hanscom is "surprisingly tender and nuanced", Skarsgård seemed "like a real threat" as Pennywise, and that Lillis is close to "heartbreaking" as Beverly Marsh. Christy Lemire of RogerEbert.com wrote that "Despite the many terrifying moments they endure in their quest scenes that will leave you trembling and giggling at once It is even more powerful in the warm, easy camaraderie between its young stars." Lemire praised the "well-chosen" cast, saying the "that combination of tones" from the performances make the film work. She spoke of Skarsgård as "working well," as he doesn't appear to be laboring so hard to frighten, and that Lillis displays a "star-making" performance". Marc Savlov of The Austin Chronicle heralded the film, its director, and screenwriters, by stating: "Muschietti and screenwriters Palmer, Fukunaga, and Dauberman have managed the translation to the big screen nearly as well as Rob Reiner did with Stand by Me (1986). Entertainment Weekly journalist Chris Nashawaty summarized "It is essentially two movies. The better by far is the one that feels like a darker Stand by Me (1986) a nostalgic coming-of-age story about seven likable outcasts riding around on their bikes and facing their fears together." Tim Grierson of Screen International spoke highly of Claude Paré and Chung Chung-hoon's ability to "drape the horror scenes in a clammy atmosphere", without seeming too far removed from "the otherwise realistic portrayal of racism, sexual humiliation and bullying" of Muschetti's piece. Katie Rife, writing for The A.V. Club, commended Chung's cinematography as succeeding at "giving the film a richness and texture that's far beyond that of most Hollywood films, let alone horror films."

The film, however, was not without criticism, as some critics were disappointed with the film's implementation of jump scares. Michael Phillips of The Chicago Tribune noted the film's "diminishing returns of one jump scare after another", writing that "nearly every scene begins and ends the same way, with a slow build leading up to a KAAA-WHUMMMMMM!!!! sound effect". Stephanie Zacharek of Time spoke highly of Muschietti's direction but nonetheless stated: "Muschietti relies too much on your garden-variety jump scares and now-standard special effects. As always, the horrors you get a close look at are much less terrifying than those that remain unseen." Erik Henriksen of The Stranger praised the "phenomenal" young cast, but regretted that the film felt disappointingly bloodless. Lindsey Bahr of The Associated Press criticized the story being an "unforgivable mess", with Bahr remarking: "Instead of building tension and suspense, 'It' just jumps from scene to scares with no connection or coherence to thread them together other than the mere fact that they've been placed on top of one-another, like toys mixed up from different sets."

=== Accolades ===
List of awards and nominations
Award	Date of ceremony	Category	Recipient(s) and nominee(s)	Result	Ref.
Bogey Awards	October 8, 2017	Bogey Award	It	Won	
Bogey Awards	October 8, 2017	Bronze	It	Won	
Bogey Awards	October 8, 2017	Silver	It	Won	
Bram Stoker Awards	March 4, 2018	Best Screenplay	Chase Palmer, Cary Joji Fukunaga, and Gary Dauberman	Nominated	
Clio Entertainment Awards	November 2, 2017	Theatrical: Teaser	Buddha Jones	Won	
Critics' Choice Movie Awards	January 11, 2018	Best Sci-Fi/Horror Movie	It	Nominated	
Empire Awards	March 18, 2018	Best Horror	It	Nominated	
Golden Schmoes	March 4, 2018	Best Horror Movie	It	Won	
Golden Schmoes	March 4, 2018	Biggest Surprise	It	Won	
Golden Schmoes	March 4, 2018	Breakthrough Artist	Bill Skarsgård	Nominated	
Golden Schmoes	March 4, 2018	Coolest Character	Pennywise	Nominated	
Golden Schmoes	March 4, 2018	Best Trailer of the Year	It	Nominated	
Goldene Leinwand	September 27, 2017	Golden Screen	It	Won	
Golden Tomato Awards	January 2, 2018	Best Horror Movie	It	Runner-up	
Golden Trailer Awards	June 6, 2017	Best Horror	New Line Cinema, Buddha Jones	Won	
Houston Film Critics Society	January 6, 2018	Best Poster	It	Nominated	
IGN Awards	December 19, 2017	Movie of the Year	It	Nominated	
IGN Awards	December 19, 2017	Best Horror Movie	It	Won	
IGN Awards	December 19, 2017	Best Supporting Actor	Bill Skarsgård	Nominated	
International Film Music Critics Association	February 22, 2018	Composer of the Year	Benjamin Wallfisch (for It, Annabelle: Creation, Bitter Harvest, A Cure for Wellness, Mully, Blade Runner 2049, and Dunkirk)	Nominated	
Jupiter Award	April 18, 2018	Best International Film	Andy Muschietti	Nominated	
Jupiter Award	April 18, 2018	Best International Actor	Bill Skarsgård	Nominated	
MTV Movie & TV Awards	June 18, 2018	Best Movie	It	Nominated	
MTV Movie & TV Awards	June 18, 2018	Best Villain	Bill Skarsgård	Nominated	
MTV Movie & TV Awards	June 18, 2018	Most Frightened Performance	Sophia Lillis	Nominated	
MTV Movie & TV Awards	June 18, 2018	Best On-Screen Team	Finn Wolfhard, Sophia Lillis, Jaeden Lieberher, Jack Dylan Grazer, Wyatt Oleff, Jeremy Ray Taylor and Chosen Jacobs	Won	
San Diego Film Critics Society	December 11, 2017	Breakthrough Artist	Sophia Lillis	Nominated	
Saturn Awards	June 27, 2018	Best Horror Film	It	Nominated	
Saturn Awards	June 27, 2018	Best Supporting Actor	Bill Skarsgård	Nominated	
Saturn Awards	June 27, 2018	Best Performance by a Younger Actor	Sophia Lillis	Nominated	
Saturn Awards	June 27, 2018	Best Make-up	Alec Gillis, Sean Sansom, Tom Woodruff, Jr. and Shane Zander	Nominated	
Seattle Film Critics Society	December 18, 2017	Best Youth Performance	Sophia Lillis	Nominated	
Seattle Film Critics Society	December 18, 2017	Villain of the Year	Bill Skarsgård	Nominated	
St. Louis Film Critics Association	December 17, 2017	Best Adapted Screenplay	Chase Palmer, Cary Joji Fukunaga, and Gary Dauberman	Nominated	
Teen Choice Awards	August 12, 2018	Movie Villain	Bill Skarsgård	Nominated	
Teen Choice Awards	August 12, 2018	Breakout Movie Star	Sophia Lillis	Nominated	
Teen Choice Awards	August 12, 2018	Movie Ship	Sophia Lillis, and Jeremy Ray Taylor	Nominated	
Washington D.C. Area Film Critics Association	December 8, 2017	Best Youth Performance	Sophia Lillis	Nominated	
Washington D.C. Area Film Critics Association	December 8, 2017	Best Acting Ensemble	It	Nominated	

== Sequel and prequel ==
Producer Roy Lee mentioned a second planned film in an interview with Collider on February 16, 2016, before principal photography had begun on the first film, saying, "Dauberman wrote the most recent draft working with Muschietti, so it's being envisioned as two movies." On July 19, 2017, Muschietti revealed that the plan is to get production underway for the sequel to It during the following spring, adding, "We'll probably have a script for the second part in January 2018. Ideally, we would start prep in March. Part one is only about the kids. Part two is about these characters 30 years later as adults, with flashbacks to 1989 when they were kids." On July 21, 2017, Muschietti spoke of looking forward to having a dialogue in the second film that does not exist within the first, stating, it seems like we're going to do it. It's the second half, it's not a sequel. It's the second half and it's very connected to the first one." Muschietti confirmed that two cut scenes from the film will hopefully be included in the second, one of which being the fire at the Black Spot from the book.

On September 25, 2017, New Line Cinema announced that the sequel would be released on September 6, 2019, with Gary Dauberman writing the script. Later in December 2017, Agent Cody Banks writer Jeffrey Jurgensen was also listed as a screenwriter. As of February 2018, Jessica Chastain was in negotiations to star as the adult Beverly Marsh. In April 2018, James McAvoy and Bill Hader entered negotiations to play the adult Bill Denbrough and Richie Tozier. In May 2018, James Ransone revealed on Twitter that he would play the adult Eddie Kaspbrak. Shortly afterwards, Andy Bean and Jay Ryan had joined the cast to play the adult Stanley Uris and Ben Hanscom respectively. In June 2018, Isaiah Mustafa signed on to play the adult Mike Hanlon. Filming had officially begun on June 19, 2018, and concluded in November 2018. Shooting took a total of 86 days. The film was released on September 6, 2019, and was a box office success although it garnered a mixed critical reception.

A prequel series titled It: Welcome to Derry premiered on October 26, 2025 on HBO, with subsequent episodes airing weekly. It was previously slated to stream on HBO Max.

== See also ==
- List of highest-grossing R-rated films
