= London Calling (film) =

2025 film by Allan Ungar

- Theatrical release poster
- Directed by: Allan Ungar
- Written by: Levin Menekse; Quinn Wolfe; Allan Ungar
- Produced by: Julia Sandberg Hansson; Delon Bakker; Kyle Ambrose; Ryan Winterstern; Apur Parikh; Nathan Klingher
- Starring: Josh Duhamel; Jeremy Ray Taylor; Rick Hoffman; Aidan Gillen
- Cinematography: Alexander Chinnici
- Edited by: Richard Starkey
- Music by: Trevor Morris
- Production companies: Barreling Wave; Short Porch Pictures; Mannequin Films
- Distributed by: Quiver Distribution
- Release date: September 19, 2025 (United States)
- Running time: 114 minutes
- Country: United States
- Language: English

London Calling is a 2025 American action comedy film directed by Allan Ungar and written by Omer Levin Menekse, Quinn Wolfe and Ungar. It stars Josh Duhamel, Jeremy Ray Taylor, Rick Hoffman, and Aidan Gillen.

== Plot ==
After mistakenly killing the relative of London’s biggest crime lord, hitman and ex-pat Tommy Ward is forced to go on the run and take refuge in Los Angeles. In order to get back to his son, Tommy makes a deal with his new employer Benson: teach his socially awkward son Julian how to become a man in exchange for safe passage back to the UK. Tommy is forced to drag Julian along on his latest contract killing of a renowned assassin. What starts off as a simple ride-along soon descends into mayhem as Tommy and Julian must find a way to survive the night so that Tommy can get back to his son and Julian can win the approval of his father.

== Cast ==
- Josh Duhamel as Tommy Ward
- Aidan Gillen as Freddy Darby
- Jeremy Ray Taylor as Julian
- Rick Hoffman as Benson
- Arnold Vosloo as Harry

== Production ==
=== Casting ===
In December 2023, it was announced that Duhamel was reuniting with Ungar after the success of Bandit, and that he would be joined by a cast that included Gillen, Taylor, and Hoffman. Arnold Vosloo and Neil Sandilands joined the ensemble shortly after.

=== Filming ===
Filming took place in Cape Town, between December 2023 and January 2024. Due to the 2023 SAG-AFTRA strike, filming was delayed and had to take place over the Christmas holiday.

While speaking with Extra, Josh Duhamel revealed that he almost missed the birth of his son due to the schedule, but was able to get back just in time.

== Release ==
London Calling was screened in the Industry Selects program at the 2024 Toronto International Film Festival on September 7, 2024. It was released theatrically by Quiver Distribution on September 19, 2025.

The film topped multiple streaming charts around the world. It was the #1 film on HBO MAX in Asia in its first weekend and remained in the top 10 for three weeks, it premiered at #1 on Netflix in Germany and Austria where it remained for its first week, and it debuted as the #1 film across the Middle East on Starz.

In the United States, the film premiered on Hulu where it climbed the charts to become #2. The film was also released on Paramount Plus in Canada where it reached the top 3 of all films and remained in the top 10 for its first two weeks. In the UK, it was the #3 film on Amazon Prime Video for its first week.

== Reception ==
Critical reception for the film has been mixed. Many critics praised the chemistry between Josh Duhamel and Jeremy Ray Taylor, and highlighted the film's emotional depth and heart, while others criticized its use of tropes. Courtney Small from Exclaim! stated: "Ungar and his star prove once again to be a dynamic director-and-actor paring. Duhamel is delightful as the curmudgeon hitman with a heart of gold". Critic Sean Tajipour gave the film four out of five stars, calling it "Fast-paced, funny, and surprisingly full of emotion. Duhamel gives one of his most charismatic performances in years and Ungar continues to prove he knows how to deliver movies that are both stylish and highly entertaining".The Action Elite also gave the film four out of five stars and hailed it as "one of the best action comedies of the year", while Movie Scene wrote that "Josh Duhamel and Jeremy Ray Taylor shine from start to finish. London Calling not only delivers a wildly entertaining film on all fronts, but an emotionally resonant experience".

Peyton Robinson from RogerEbert.com was less enthusiastic and gave the film a negative review, but stated that while "the film stumbles, the intent is clear: to have fun". In a review from The Guardian, Phil Hoad lauded the film as a "Tarantino-esque caper" which has good moments, but would have fared better with stronger writing.

On the review aggregator website Rotten Tomatoes, 47% of 30 critics' reviews are positive, with an average rating of 4.8/10. The website's consensus reads: "London Calling struggles to execute its promising premise, delivering a second-tier crime comedy where cheap laughs and tired tropes overshadow flashes of fun and character chemistry."

== See also ==
- Tarantinoesque film
