= Sympathy for the Devil (2023 film) =

American film by Yuval Adler

- Theatrical release poster
- Directed by: Yuval Adler
- Written by: Luke Paradise
- Produced by: Allan Ungar; Alex Lebovici; Stuart Manashil; Nicolas Cage
- Starring: Nicolas Cage; Joel Kinnaman
- Cinematography: Steven Holleran
- Edited by: Alan Canant
- Music by: Ishai Adar
- Production companies: Capstone Global; Hammerstone Studios; Signature Films
- Distributed by: RLJE Films
- Release dates: July 22, 2023 (Fantasia International Film Festival); July 28, 2023 (United States)
- Running time: 90 minutes
- Country: United States
- Language: English
- Box office: $178,267

Sympathy for the Devil is a 2023 American psychological thriller film directed by Yuval Adler and written by Luke Paradise. It stars Nicolas Cage as The Passenger and Joel Kinnaman as The Driver.

The film had its world premiere at the Fantasia International Film Festival on July 22, 2023, before its theatrical release on July 28, by RLJE Films.

== Plot ==
David Chamberlain, an expectant father, drives to the hospital where his wife is in labor. On the way there, a stranger gets into the back of his car, simply known as “The Passenger” and tells him to pick a card while holding a gun to his head. David randomly chooses the Ace of Spades which the passenger reveals was in his pocket. He then tells David to drive and, fearing for his life, he does so.

The passenger reveals very little about himself at first, instead mocking David’s attempt to garner sympathy by talking about his family.

Over the course of their road trip, David tries and fails multiple times to get away. First by mouthing “help” to a lady at a gas station who does not get the hint and drives away. Then by speeding so a cop pulls them over but the passenger starts a fight with the cop before asking for Satan to “get behind him”. After that, he shoots the cop several times in the head, threatens David once more, and the trip continues.

The passenger teases David by alluding that he knows him but keeping the truth of where they’re going to himself.

In another escape attempt, David jumps out of the moving car and the passenger struggles to stop before crashing. When David thinks about running away, the passenger answers his phone and discovers the location of David’s wife in the hospital. Knowing she’ll die if he runs, David emerges from hiding, gets back into the car, and they keep going.

They soon stop at a diner to eat where the passenger begins to reveal the true purpose of the kidnapping. He tells David a story about a bookkeeper in Brooklyn who worked for an Irish Mob boss named Jacob Sullivan based in Boston. The bookkeeper fell in love, got married, and had a baby girl. Unfortunately, an associate of Sullivan started stealing money from him and Sullivan told the bookkeeper to invite him over for dinner. He was killed that night and the passenger tells David the same thing will happen to him when they reach their destination.

The passenger gets more and more unhinged the longer they talk. He seems to know David, thinking he’s someone else, and knows he’s lying about his personal life. He demands to know the truth, but David doesn’t know what he’s talking about. After more denial, the passenger snaps, shoots up the diner, and sets it on fire while David calls the cops then runs outside.

In the parking lot, the passenger continues his story. He reveals that he was the bookkeeper and his wife walked in on the murder committed by Jacob Sullivan. David and the passenger then fight, with the passenger again gaining the upper hand. They return to the car to continue the journey.

The passenger tells David that a man named James Levine called him. Levine was a man who “fixes things” and told him that his wife, being a witness, was a liability. While the passenger was away from home, Levine burned his house down, killing his wife and daughter. The passenger believes that David is, in fact, James, and demands he “say the words out loud”. Dead-eyed, David reveals the truth: “Sullivan ordered the hit.”

David then veers off the road, crashing the car, and fatally wounding the passenger. Cops arrive at the scene as the passenger crawls out but David shoots and kills both of them.

With the passenger dying, David, really James Levine, finally reveals the whole truth about himself: he was responsible for the death of the passenger's wife and daughter. However, the daughter was collateral damage and he feels God punished him for that by “taking” his first born. The passenger listens to the confession, unable to speak as he coughs up blood and weeps, and James presses his forearm to his throat, strangling him to death.

Afterwards, James wipes his fingerprints from the gun and puts it in the passenger's hand to frame him for the cops’ murder. As more cops arrive, James finds the Ace of Spades cards amongst the wreckage and pockets it. Listening to a voicemail, he learns his wife gave birth to a daughter that has his eyes. He smiles, stands, and walks to the cops feigning innocence.

== Cast ==
- Nicolas Cage as The Passenger
- Joel Kinnaman as The Driver / David Chamberlain / James Levine
- Alexis Zollicoffer as the Waitress
- Cameron Lee Price as the Cop
- Oliver McCallum as the Boy
- Burns Burns as the Owner
- Rich Hopkins as the Trucker
- Nancy Good as Grandma
- Kaiwi Lyman as Colleague

== Production ==
Principal photography began in Las Vegas in July 2022. Approximately half the film was shot at a Las Vegas-based virtual studio owned by Vū Technologies. Sympathy for the Devil was the first feature film in Nevada history to be shot on an LED sound stage.

== Release ==
In September 2022, the film was presented to buyers at TIFF. In March 2023, RLJE Films acquired the North America, United Kingdom, Ireland, Australia and New Zealand distribution rights. The film had its world premiere at the Fantasia International Film Festival on July 22, 2023 and was released in theaters on July 28, 2023. It will be released by Signature Entertainment in the United Kingdom and Ireland.

The film was released on Blu-ray and DVD on September 26, 2023, followed by a 4K UHD release on November 14, 2023.

== Reception ==
On the review aggregator website Rotten Tomatoes, 60% of 79 critics' reviews are positive, with an average rating of 5.6/10. The website's consensus reads: "Sympathy for the Devil makes the most of Nicolas Cage's propensity for playing unhinged characters – and for some viewers, that'll be more than enough to make it worth a watch." Metacritic, which uses a weighted average, assigned the film a score of 54 out of 100, based on 18 critics, indicating "mixed or average" reviews.

Bobby LePire from Film Threat wrote, "Cage and Kinnaman work well together, with the former being gloriously over-the-top and the latter keeping things grounded in a form of reality. All in all, this thriller works from beginning to end". The San Francisco Chronicle's Mick LaSalle gave a positive review saying, "It takes a while for it all to come into focus, but one thing is clear: This very well-made thriller doesn't have only one mystery man in it. It has two".

Greg Archer of MovieWeb praised Cage's performance saying, "It's a tour du force performance for the books." Jordan Mintzer of The Hollywood Reporter noted as "[Nicolas] Cage chews up every scene he's in and seems to be having a blast — he's always over-the-top and never boring to watch, in a film that delivers the goods for those who like him best when he's just about lost his mind".
