= The History of Us =

2013 novel by Leah Stewart

- First edition
- Author: Leah Stewart
- Language: English
- Publisher: Touchstone Books
- Publication date: January 8, 2013
- Publication place: United States
- Media type: Print (Hardcover)
- Pages: 384 pages
- ISBN: 1451672624

The History of Us is a 2013 novel by Leah Stewart. The book released on January 8, 2013, through Touchstone Books and concerns three siblings who must review both their past and their relationship with each other after their aunt plans to sell their childhood home. Stewart began writing the book due to an interest in the "dynamic between coming to see what’s good about the place where you are living and continuing to feel like you’ve been displaced from where you should be".

== Synopsis ==
In the book Harvard professor Eloise Hempel must take on the responsibility of caring for her sister's three children (Theodora, Josh, and Claire) after her sudden death. In order to more easily take care of them, Eloise moves into her mother's ancient home and begins the task of raising the three children as well as maintaining the house. Almost twenty years later, Eloise and her nieces and nephew still live in the house, which Eloise wants to sell so she can work on living her own life. However, when her mother begins to make the children compete against each other to see who will keep the house, secrets begin coming to the surface that forces everyone to either take a deeper look at their interpersonal relationships with each other or run the risk of having their relationships shatter.

== Reception ==
Early reviews for the book have been mostly positive, with Kirkus Reviews giving the book a starred review. Booklist praised the novel while Publishers Weekly called it "forgettable", criticizing the "combination of a melodramatic story line and a focus on minutiae".
