= Jeremy Ray Taylor =

American actor (born 2003)

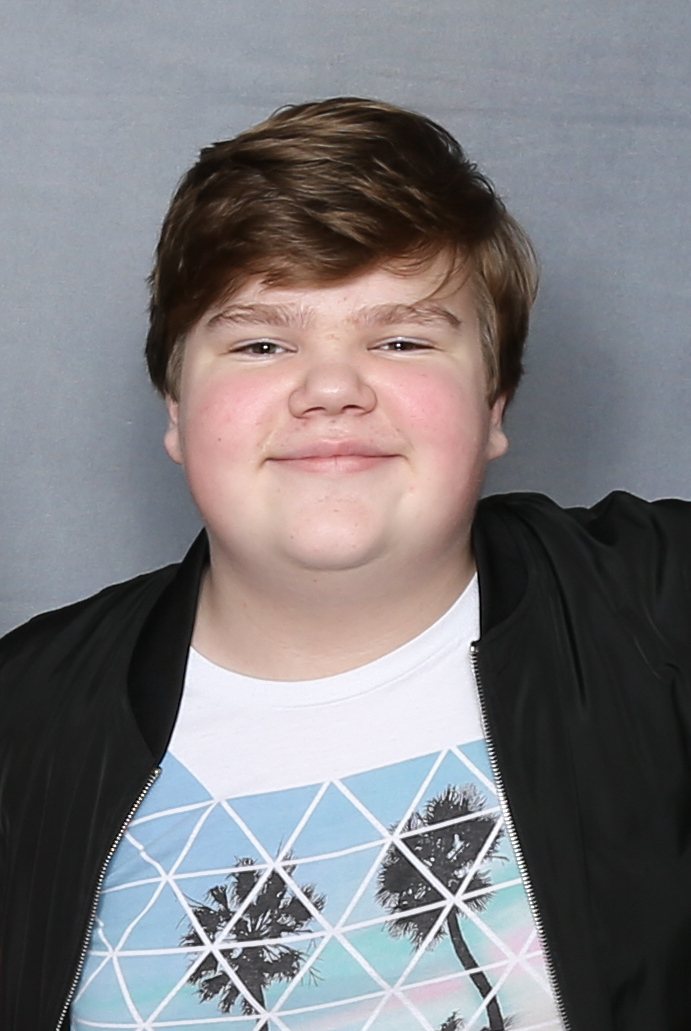
- Taylor in 2018
- Born: Jeremy Raymond Taylor; June 2, 2003 (age 22); Bluff City, Tennessee, U.S.
- Occupation: Actor
- Years active: 2011–present
- Spouse: Kaylie Taylor (m. 2024)

Jeremy Raymond Taylor (born June 2, 2003) is an American actor. He is known for his role as Ben Hanscom in the 2017 adaptation of Stephen King's novel It and its 2019 sequel, as well as the role of Sonny Quinn in Goosebumps 2: Haunted Halloween (2018).

== Early life ==
Taylor was raised in Bluff City, Tennessee, the youngest of four boys of Tracy, a band manager, and Michael Taylor. He traveled with his mother and developed a stage persona that intrigued his family. At the age of 8, he was signed to a talent manager and began his acting career.

== Personal life ==
On September 28, 2023, Taylor announced his engagement to his girlfriend of six years, Kaylie. They were married on February 4, 2024.

== Filmography ==
=== Film ===
| Year | Title | Role | Notes |
|---|---|---|---|
| 2013 | 42 | Boy | |
| 2015 | Ant-Man | Bully | Uncredited |
| 2015 | Alvin and the Chipmunks: The Road Chip | Kid | |
| 2015 | The History of Us | Young Chris | TV movie |
| 2017 | It | Benjamin "Ben" Hanscom | |
| 2017 | Geostorm | Emmett | Uncredited |
| 2018 | Goosebumps 2: Haunted Halloween | Sonny Quinn | |
| 2019 | It Chapter Two | Young Benjamin "Ben" Hanscom | |
| 2022 | Senior Year | Neil Chudd | |
| 2024 | This Too Shall Pass | | |
| 2025 | London Calling | Julian | |

=== Television ===
| Year | Title | Role | Notes |
|---|---|---|---|
| 2011 | Reed Between the Lines | Albert | Episode: "The 'C' Is Silent" |
| 2016 | Good Behavior | Another Kid | Episode: "We Pretend We're Stuck" |
| 2018 | James Corden's Next James Corden | Himself | 5 episodes |
| 2019 | Schooled | Reed | Episode:"Tamagotchi and Bells" |
| 2019 | Are You Afraid of the Dark? | Graham Raimi | 3 episodes |
| 2021 | Big Sky | Bridger | 11 episodes |
