= Mixed martial arts rules =

Mixed martial arts competitions rules

Most rule sets for mixed martial arts (MMA) competitions have evolved since the early days of Vale Tudo. As a result of health, legal, and moral concerns, many different rulesets were created, which give different countries and promotions very different tactics and strategies. Similarly, shoot wrestling organizations, such as Shooto, expanded their rulesets to integrate elements of Vale Tudo into their sport. However, for the most part, fighters accustomed to one rule set can easily acclimate to the others.

The Unified Rules of Mixed Martial Arts are the most widely used ruleset in North America and are used by many MMA promotions worldwide adopted by virtually all U.S. state athletic commissions that regulate MMA and is used most notably in the Ultimate Fighting Championship. The Unified Rules are the de facto rules for MMA in the United States, and have been adopted by other promotions and jurisdictions worldwide. Shooto was one of the earliest organizations to require open-fingered padded gloves, and Pride rules, after PRIDE Fighting Championships, which were also adopted by UFC; and most recently the Global MMA Ruleset, developed by the Global Martial Arts Commission (GMAC), is used by ONE Championship and incorporates elements from multiple existing rulesets, including the Unified Rules and PRIDE-style rules.

== Evolution ==
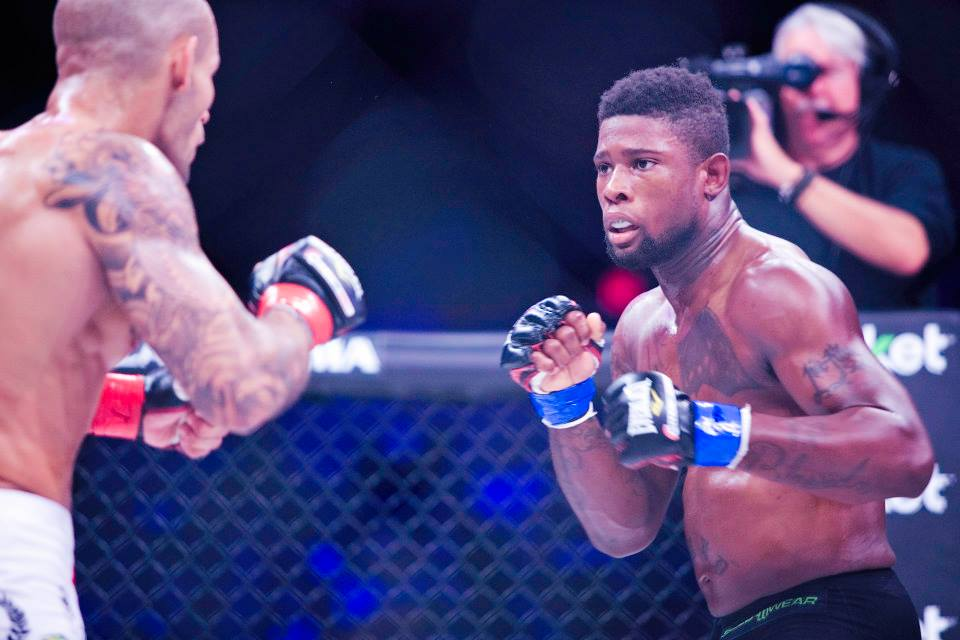
MMA rule-sets require the use of small open finger gloves (4-6 oz). This allows the fighters to use their fingers to grab and grapple the opponent.

Some main motivations for these rule changes included:

- Protection of the health of the fighters: This goal was partially motivated to clear the stigma of "barbaric, no rules, fighting-to-the-death" matches that MMA obtained because of its Vale Tudo and no holds barred roots. It also helps athletes avoid injuries which would otherwise hamper the training regimens that improve skill and ability and lead to better fights in the future.
- Providing spectacle for spectators.

Weight classes emerged when knowledge about submission holds spread. When more fighters became well-versed in submission techniques and avoiding submissions, differences in weight became a substantial factor.

Headbutts were prohibited because it was a technique that required little effort and could quickly turn the match into a bloody mess. Headbutting was common among wrestlers because their skill in takedowns allowed them to quickly transfer bouts to the ground where they could assault opponents with headbutts while not being required to alter their position. There has been some criticism that techniques banned from MMA, including headbutts, are actually very effective fighting techniques.

Small, open-finger gloves were introduced to protect fists in punches while still allowing for effective grappling. Gloves were first mandatory in Japan's Shooto league, but are now mandatory in matches for nearly every promotion. Although some fighters may have well conditioned fists, others may not. The small bones in an unprotected and unconditioned fist are prone to break when it hits a torso or forehead with power. Gloves also reduce the occurrence of cuts (and stoppages due to cuts) and encourage fighters to use their hands for striking, both of which enable more captivating matches.

Time limits were established to avoid long fights on the ground with little perceivable action. No time limit matches also complicated the airing of live events. Similar motivations produced the "stand up" rule, where the referee can stand fighters up if it is perceived both are resting on the ground or are not advancing toward a dominant position.

== Early American rules ==
An early ruleset for mixed-style fighting competition in the United States was developed in 1979 by martial artist Bill Viola, co-founder of CV Productions, Inc. Viola and fellow promoter Frank Caliguri developed rules and regulations to govern their mixed-style competitions, bringing competitors from different combat sports together under a common ruleset.

The rules were implemented in the promotion's Tough Guy Contest events beginning in March 1980 in New Kensington, Pennsylvania. Contemporary coverage described competitions permitting a combination of striking and grappling techniques while restricting certain attacks, with weight divisions, protective equipment and medical supervision.

The rules and safety measures used in the early competitions were later documented in the 2017 feature-length documentary Tough Guys, which premiered on Showtime. The film incorporates archival footage from the competitions and documents rules prohibiting techniques such as eye-gouging, biting and fish-hooking, as well as the use of protective equipment including open-hand gloves designed to permit grappling. Showtime described the competitions depicted in the film as a precursor to the modern mixed martial arts phenomenon.

The mixed-style format did not fall within the existing jurisdiction of the Pennsylvania State Athletic Commission, which regulated boxing and wrestling, leading to a regulatory dispute over the competitions. Pennsylvania subsequently enacted Pennsylvania Senate Bill 632 in 1983, commonly known as the Tough Guy Law, prohibiting "Tough Guy contests" and "Battle of the Brawlers contests." The law defined the prohibited competitions as physical-contact bouts employing boxing, wrestling or martial-arts tactics, or combinations of those techniques, including punches, kicks and choking. The legislation effectively ended the early mixed-style competitions promoted by CV Productions in Pennsylvania.

== Unified Rules of Mixed Martial Arts ==
In April 2000, the California State Athletic Commission (CSAC) voted unanimously in favor of regulations that later became the foundation for the Unified Rules of Mixed Martial Arts. However, when the legislation was sent to California's capital for review, it was determined that the sport fell outside the jurisdiction of the CSAC, rendering the vote superfluous.

In September 2000, the New Jersey State Athletic Control Board (NJSACB) began to allow MMA promoters to conduct events in New Jersey. The intent was to allow the NJSACB to observe actual events and gather information to establish a comprehensive set of rules to effectively regulate the sport.

On April 3, 2001, the NJSACB held a meeting to discuss the regulation of MMA events. This meeting attempted to unify the myriad of rules and regulations which had been utilized by the different MMA organizations. At this meeting, the proposed uniform rules were agreed upon by the NJSACB, several other regulatory bodies, numerous promoters of MMA events and other interested parties in attendance. At the conclusion of the meeting, all parties in attendance were able to agree upon a uniform set of rules to govern the sport of MMA.

The rules adopted by the NJSACB have become the de facto standard set of rules for professional MMA across North America. All state, provincial, & municipal athletic commissions that regulate MMA have assimilated these rules into their existing unarmed combat competition rules and statutes. For a promotion to hold MMA events in a sanctioned venue, the promotion must abide by the commission's body of rules.

On July 30, 2009, a motion was made at the annual meeting of the Association of Boxing Commissions to adopt these rules as the "Unified Rules of Mixed Martial Arts". The motion passed unanimously.

=== Rounds ===
Every round is five minutes in duration with a one-minute rest period in-between rounds. Non-title matches must not normally exceed three rounds, but the governing commission can grant dispensation for non-title five round bouts, as is usually done for the Main Event in the UFC. Title matches can be sanctioned for five rounds.

=== Attire ===
All competitors must fight in approved shorts, without shoes or any other sort of foot padding. Shirts (except in women categories), gis or long pants (including gi pants) are not allowed. Fighters must use approved light gloves (4–6 ounces) that allow fingers to grab. A mouthguard and groin guard are also required and are checked by a State Athletic Committee official before being allowed to enter the cage/ring. Furthermore, approved leg and chest (in the case of women) protectors must be provided by the contestant.

=== Judging criteria ===
The ten-point must system is used for all fights. Three judges score each round with ten points to the winner and nine points or fewer to the other fighter. In New Jersey, the fewest points a fighter can receive is 7. If the round is even, both fighters receive ten points. Penalty points (usually one point for each offence, occasionally two points) decided by the referee are deducted from each judge's score for that round for the offending fighter.

The Association of Boxing Commissions has published a guideline of what judges in the US should consider most when scoring a round. "Effective striking/grappling" (defined as legal strikes that inflict more damage on one fighter in that round, as well as successful takedowns, reversals, and submission attempts) is seen as the primary criterion, with judges also asked to take each round on its own merits rather than consider cumulative impact of strikes. "Effective aggression" (where judges consider who made more of an effort to finish the fight in that round) is a secondary criterion, followed by cage generalship and dictating the pace of the fight. The ABC also encourages its judges to score rounds 10-8 if a judge feels that one fighter has landed a substantial amount of "impactful" strikes or spent large amounts of time in dominant grappling positions, as "it is absolutely essential to the evolution of the sport and to demonstrate fairness to fighters" that rounds where a fighter controls much of the action are properly scored to reward that fighter.

At the end of the fight, each judge submits their total score for all rounds for each fighter, to determine the result by the following criteria:

- Unanimous decision win: All three judges have the same fighter as the winner.
- Majority decision win: Two judges have one fighter winning the fight and the third judge scores it a draw.
- Split decision win: Two judges have one fighter winning the fight and the third judge has the other fighter winning it.
- Unanimous draw: All three judges score it a draw.
- Majority draw: Two judges score it a draw, and the third judge has a winner.
- Split draw: One judge scores it a draw, and the other two judges have different winners.

=== Fouls ===
As set out by the Association of Boxing Commissions:

- Grabbing the fence
- Holding opponent's shorts or gloves
- Head-butting
- Biting or spitting at an opponent
- Hair pulling
- Fish-hooking
- Intentionally placing a finger into any orifice, or into any cut or laceration of an opponent
- Eye gouging of any kind
- Groin attacks
- Small joint manipulation
- Strikes to the spine or back of the head or anything behind the ears (see Rabbit punch)
- Throat strikes of any kind, including, without limitation, grabbing the trachea
- Fingers outstretched towards opponent's face/eyes
- Clawing, pinching, twisting the flesh
- Kicking and knee-striking the head of a grounded opponent (see Soccer kick, note that a fighter is "grounded" when any part of their body other than their hands or feet are in contact with the canvas)
- Stomping an opponent on the ground
- Spiking an opponent to the canvas on their head or neck (see Piledriver)
- Swearing or offensive language in the cage
- Throwing opponent out of the ring/fighting area
- Any unsportsmanlike conduct that causes an injury to opponent
- Attacking an opponent during a break
- Attacking an opponent who is under the care of the referee
- Timidity (excessively avoiding contact, consistent dropping of mouthpiece, or faking an injury)
- Interference from a mixed martial artist's cornerman
- Flagrant disregard of the referee's instructions
- Attacking an opponent after the bell has sounded the end of the round

When a foul is charged, the referee in their discretion may deduct one or more points as a penalty. If a foul incapacitates a fighter, then the match may end in a disqualification if the foul was intentional, or a "no contest" if unintentional. If a foul causes a fighter to be unable to continue later in the bout, it ends with a technical decision win to the injured fighter if the injured fighter is ahead on points, otherwise it is a technical draw.

=== Medical requirements ===
- Contestants shall complete all pre-licensure medical examinations and tests required by the jurisdiction licensing the contest.
- The jurisdiction licensing the contest shall conduct or supervise all pre-contest weigh-ins and may hold or supervise a rules meeting for all contestants and their cornermen.
- Post-contest medical examination.
  - Immediately following a contest, each contestant shall be given a medical examination by a physician appointed by the commission. The medical examination may include any examinations or tests the commission deems necessary to determine the post-contest physical fitness of a contestant.
  - Any contestant who refuses to submit to a post-contest medical examination shall be immediately suspended for an indefinite period.

=== Prohibited substances ===
- Use of prohibited substances: The use of any illegal drug, narcotic, stimulant, depressant, or analgesic of any description, or alcohol substance, by a contestant either before or during a match, shall result in the immediate disqualification of the contestant from the match and disciplinary action in accordance with the commission licensing the contest.
- Detection of prohibited substances: In order to detect the presence of any prohibited substance, a contestant shall submit to any pre-contest or post-contest urinalysis or other laboratory procedure that is ordered by the physician appointed by the commission. Refusal to submit to such testing shall result in the immediate disqualification of the contestant from the match and an indefinite suspension from the sport of MMA.
- Urinalysis:
  - All contestants may be ordered to complete a pre-contest urinalysis exam to detect the presence of any drug.
  - In addition to a pre-contest analysis, the local commission may, at its discretion, decide to test for the presence of performance-enhancing drugs and thereby require additional urine specimens to be produced at any time after the completion of the contest.
  - Collection of specimens for urinalysis testing shall be conducted or supervised by a commission official. Refusal to submit to such testing shall result in the immediate disqualification of the contestant from the match and an indefinite suspension from the sport of MMA.

== PRIDE Fighting Championships (defunct) ==
Historically, PRIDE's rules events and Bushido events. However, it was announced on November 29, 2006, that Bushido events would be discontinued. When holding events in the US, PRIDE abided by the Unified Rules, but added the prohibition against elbows to the head.

=== Rounds ===
The first round is ten minutes in duration and the second and third rounds are five minutes in duration. There is a two-minute rest period between each round.

=== Attire ===
PRIDE allowed fighters some latitude in their choice of attire, most notably the allowance of a gi or amateur wrestling shoes, but open finger gloves, a mouthguard, and a protective cup were mandatory.

=== Judging criteria ===
If the match reaches its time limit then the outcome of the bout is determined by the three judges. The fight is scored in its entirety and not round-by-round. After the conclusion of the bout, each judge must decide a winner. Matches cannot end in a draw. A decision is made according to the following criteria in this order of priority:

1. the effort made to finish the fight via KO or submission,
2. damage given to the opponent,
3. standing combinations and ground control,
4. takedowns and takedown defense,
5. aggressiveness, and
6. weight (in the case that the weight difference is 10 kg (22 lb) or more).

If a fight is stopped on advice of the ring doctor after an accidental but illegal action, e.g., a clash of heads, and the contest is in its second or third round, the match will be decided by the judges using the same criteria.

=== Legal techniques ===
PRIDE allowed the following techniques that the Unified Rules disallowed:

- Stomps to the head of a grounded opponent.
- Soccer kicks to the head of a grounded opponent.
- Knees to the head of a grounded opponent.

=== Fouls ===
In addition to the common fouls, PRIDE Fighting Championships considers elbow strikes to the head and face to be fouls.

In the event that a fighter is injured by illegal actions, then at the discretion of the referee and ring doctor, the round is resumed after enough time has been given for the fighter to recover. If the match cannot be continued due to the severity of the injury then the fighter who perpetrated the action will be disqualified.

=== General conduct ===
- If both fighters are on the verge of falling out of the ring or become entangled in the ropes, the referee will stop the action. The fighters must immediately stop their movements and will then be repositioned in the center of the ring in the same position. Once they are comfortably repositioned, they resume at the referee's instruction.
- If fighters commit the following actions, they shall be given a yellow card by officials: Stalling or failure to initiate any offensive attack, making no attempt to finalize the match or damage the opponent, and holding the opponent's body with the arms and legs to produce a stalemate. A yellow card results in a 10% deduction/fine of the fighter's fight purse.

=== Bushido rules ===
PRIDE Bushido events instituted distinct variations to the full PRIDE rules:

- Bushido bouts consist of two rounds; the first lasting ten minutes and the second lasting five. Intermissions between each round remain two minutes in length.
- In full PRIDE rules, a total of three yellow cards results in a red card (disqualification). In Bushido, yellow cards can be given out in an unlimited number without disqualification.

PRIDE discontinued Bushido events in late-2006 and their rules were last used for lightweight and welterweight fights at PRIDE Shockwave 2006. As the lightweight and welterweight divisions will now be on the main PRIDE shows, the rules for the lighter classes are also changing to reflect standard PRIDE rules.

== ONE Championship ==
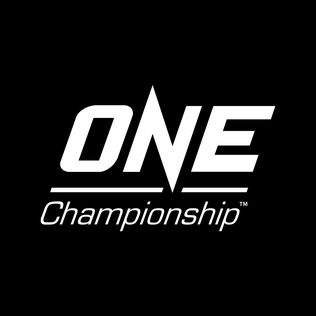
ONE Championship logo.

ONE Championship MMA rule set uses the Global MMA Rule Set which blends a combination of Best Practices from Asian and Non-Asian Rules. ONE also has Competitions for Muay Thai, Kickboxing and Grappling rulesets.

=== Weight Classes ===
ONE has a number of weight classes for its fighters to compete in, with a World Champion and top five competitors being ranked ONE Championship Rankings in each Weight Class.

The weight classes for ONE are:

Weight Class	Upper Limit (lb)	Upper Limit (kg)	Gender
Atomweight	115 lb	52.2 kg	Female
Strawweight	125 lb	56.7 kg	Male / Female
Flyweight	135 lb	61.2 kg	Male / Female
Bantamweight	145 lb	65.8 kg	Male / Female
Featherweight	155 lb	70.3 kg	Male
Lightweight	170 lb	77.1 kg	Male
Welterweight	185 lb	83.9 kg	Male
Middleweight	205 lb	93 kg	Male
Light-Heavyweight	225 lb	102.1 kg	Male
Heavyweight	265 lb	120.2 kg	Male

=== Weigh-in and hydration ===
Unlike the UFC, ONE does not allow weight cutting, ONE will assign an athlete their weight class based on their "walking weight" (based on the daily training weight). An athlete's "walking weight" is monitored regularly throughout the time an athlete is with contracted to ONE. Fights are strictly only offered to an athlete based on their "walking weight".

Upon arrival at the start of event week athletes' weights will be checked. Every athlete must be within the restrictions of the contracted weight class or catchweight limit.

During event week, all athletes participate in a combined weigh-in and hydration test. Every athlete must submit a urine sample for a hydration check. If the athlete passes this test, he or she can weigh-in. The athlete's must weigh-in within the restrictions of the contracted weight class or catchweight limit.

On event day, those athletes who made weight and passed the hydration test on the previous day do not have to weigh-in. However, athletes who miss weight or fail a hydration test, must pass the hydration test and make weight on event day.

If an athlete fails the hydration test on event day, he or she is not permitted to compete. Should an athlete pass the hydration test but weigh-in above the restrictions of the contracted weight class, then the bout may take place at a catchweight if the athlete is within 5 percent of their opponent's official weight, and if the opponent agrees to competing at this catchweight. Additionally, a percentage of the athlete's purse will be given to the opponent due to failure to make the contracted weight.

Post-bout weight may not exceed 5 percent over the weight class or catchweight limit. If an athlete were to commit this offense, he or she will be held to the rules below:

- First offense – athlete receives an official warning.
- Second offense – athlete will be penalized 25 percent of their total fight purse.
- Third offense – athlete will be penalized 50 percent of their purse. The athlete will also be permanently disqualified from competing in the weight class and must move up to the next higher weight class.

=== Rounds ===
Similar to the Unified Rules, each bout is three rounds of five minutes per round, with a one-minute break between rounds, except for World Championship bouts will be five rounds of five minutes per round, with a one-minute break between rounds.

=== Attire ===
Under the Global MMA Rule Set attire is limited to:

- MMA Trunks
- Spandex/Lycra shorts (that may not extend beyond the knee in length)
- Board Shorts (Shorts are not to have any exposed pockets or ties)

=== Fouls and Legal Techniques ===
Unlike the Unified Rules, in ONE the following techniques are legal and will not result in a foul:

- 12-6 elbows of the head of a grounded opponent
- Knees to the head of a grounded opponent
- Stomps of a grounded opponent (except for head stomps)

Soccer kicks were also previously legal in ONE, but have been banned since 2016 as part of the company's worldwide expansion plans.

Other than those listed above, fouls for the Unified Rules and ONE are the same.

=== Penalizing Fouls/Illegal Issues ===
In ONE and under the Global Rule Set, fouls are dealt with by the referee, and uses a yellow/red card system that will affect the fighters purse and potentially be factored in by the judges.

The referee may choose to issue Cautions, Warnings, Yellow Cards or Disqualifications based on the nature, severity, and repetition of the fouling behavior. In doing so, the referee must have thoroughly considered whether the athlete has, through their violation, damaged their opponent's chances of victory, and if the violation was deliberately committed.

==== Stalling ====
When the action slows in the standing position, the referee will give the command "action". When the action slows on the ground, the referee will give the commands "improve your position" or "work to finish". If the action has not increased, the referee may stand the athletes or penalize with a yellow card. If a yellow card is displayed, the bout will resume from the standing position. Cageside judges may display a red or blue marker as a signal to the referee and cornermen that the athlete from the corner displayed is stalling. Cornermen should take this display into account and encourage their athlete to compete more actively and aggressively.

==== Caution ====
A caution is given in the event of a minor violation. It may occur without stopping the action of the bout.

==== Official Warning ====
In the event of repeated or a more significant violation, the referee will issue an official warning to the fighter. The referee will stop the action and make it clear and obvious that the athlete has been warned for their infraction.

==== Yellow Cards ====
Any flagrant disregard for the rules or stalling, may result in a yellow card. A yellow card will result in a 10% deduction in the athlete's prize money (purse) and may factor in the judges' decision. Each yellow card is a successive 10% deduction from the athlete's earnings. If an athlete is penalized with a yellow card, the fouled opponent will be given the choice to resume the bout from the same position as when the foul occurred or from a standing position.

==== Disqualification / Red Card ====
At the referee's discretion an athlete may be disqualified based on repetitive or severe fouling. If an athlete is disqualified the company may deduct a minimum of 30% to a maximum of 100% of the athletes pay.

=== Judging and Scoring ===
In the event that a bout lasts the rounds, the decision for winner will go to the judges score. The scoring in ONE is significantly different to that of the Unified Rules in that matches are scored in their entirety, and not round-by-round. This difference means fighters who perform extremely well in the final round even after a slow start, and score well in the judging criteria are still able to win the bout (compared to UFC where if a fighter loses the first two rounds, but comes back in the last, they will lose the whole bout.)

==== Criteria ====
The judging criteria that ONE Judges use for scoring a bout are listed below in descending order of importance:

1. Near-knockout/near-submission
2. Damage (internal, accumulated, superficial)
3. Striking Superiority / Ground Control (ground control and superior positioning)
4. Earned takedowns or takedown defense
5. Aggression

== RIZIN Fighting Federation ==
RIZIN Fighting Federation uses a ruleset largely similar to that of PRIDE's, which is appropriate given the involvement of longtime Japanese MMA promoter Nobuyuki Sakakibara in both promotions. Men's fights in RIZIN are either two rounds with Round 1 lasting 10 minutes and Round 2 lasting 5 minutes, or 3x5 minute rounds. Championship fights in RIZIN are 3x5 minute rounds, as are all women's MMA matches, and all matches are held in a ring in order to allow for both MMA and kickboxing fights to be held on the same card. Judging is done based on the entirety of a fight and the criteria goes damage/effective aggression, effort to finish the fight, and ring generalship, in that order. Soccer kicks and knees to the head of a grounded opponent are both legal. Elbows (including 12-6 elbows) to the head of a grounded opponent are allowed if both fighters agree to permit them.

== Other mixed martial arts promotions ==
=== Shooto ===
- Uses A, B, and C levels. The C level is considered for amateurs only.
- Every level has its own rules and restrictions.
- The C level rules require headgear to be worn and prohibit striking on the ground.
- In case of a knockdown (when any part of a competitor's body touches the mat solely as the result of a strike) the referee will perform a 10-count. The competitor has until the count of 10 to return to a standing position. Three knock downs in a single round will end the bout. There is also a mandatory standing 8 count.

=== ZST ===
- Uses two 5-minute rounds.
- Does not use judges. The fight is declared a draw if there is no KO, TKO, Submission.
- Allows elbow and knee strikes only if they are covered by padding.
- Does not allow attacking head with strikes when one fighter is in downed position.

=== K-1 Hero's (defunct) ===
- Uses two 5-minute rounds, with an extra round option should the judges be unable to determine a clear winner of the fight.
- Prohibits elbow strikes to the head, kicking by a fighter in the standing position to the face and head of a fighter in the ground position (When both fighters are in the ground position, kicking to the face and head of the opponent fighter is allowed). Knee kicking to the face and head of a fighter in the state of any ground position including 4-point position etc. is also illegal.
- Has moved to a tournament format similar to that seen in K-1, with an eight-man tournament. However, the final matches are not decided on the same evening, but at later events.

== Cage or ring ==
Mixed martial arts is often referred to as "cage fighting" in the US as it is associated with the UFC's octagonal caged fighting area. Most major MMA promotions in the US, Canada and Britain use the "cage" as a result of directly evolving from the first UFC events. There are variations on the cage such as replacing the metal fencing with a net, or using a different shape for the area other than an octagon, as the term "The Octagon" is trademarked by the UFC (though the 8-sided shape itself is not trademarked). In Japan, Brazil and some European countries such as the Netherlands an area similar to a standard boxing ring is used, but with tighter ropes and sometimes a barrier underneath the lowest rope to keep grappling athletes from rolling out of the ring. The usage of the ring in these countries is derived from the history of Vale Tudo, Japanese pro-wrestling and other MMA related sports such as kickboxing.

The choice of cage or ring is more than aesthetic, however, as it impacts the type of strategies that a fighter can implement. For example, a popular and effective strategy in a cage is to pin an opponent into the area where the fence meets the mat, and then pummel him with strikes. Randy Couture is well known for this tactic. Defensively, the cage is often used as support to fend off take-down attempts, or as a support to get from underneath an opponent (known as "walking up the cage"). These positions are not possible in a roped ring. On the other hand, the roped ring can result in entangled limbs and fighters falling through the ropes, requiring the referee to sometimes stop the fight and reposition the fighters in the center, as well as carrying the possibility for either fighter to sustain an injury. In either a cage or ring, a fighter is not allowed to grab the fence or ropes. Some critics feel that the appearance of fighting in a cage contributes to a negative image of MMA in popular media.

The following table shows what each MMA organization uses:

Organization	Cage or Ring	Primary Event Location
BAMMA	8-sided cage	(United Kingdom) UK
Bellator FC	Circular cage	(United States) USA
Cage Rage	9-sided cage	(United Kingdom) UK
Cage Warriors	8-sided cage	(United Kingdom) UK
DEEP	Ring (8-sided cage for Cage Impact series)	Japan
Extreme Fighting Championship	6-sided cage	South Africa
Invicta Fighting Championships	8-sided cage	(United States) USA
Jungle Fight	8-sided cage (Has used ring)	Brazil
King of the Cage	8-sided cage	(United States) USA
KSW	Cage	Poland
LUX Fight League	8-sided cage	Mexico
M-1 Global	Ring	Russia
MFC	Ring (Has used circular cage)	Canada
ONE	Circular cage (also uses a ring when there are kickboxing and/or Muay Thai bouts in the card)	Singapore
Pancrase	10-sided cage (Has used ring)	Japan
Pacific Xtreme Combat	Circular cage	Philippines
RESPECT.FC	Ring	Germany
Rizin Fighting Federation	Ring	Japan
Road FC	8-sided cage	South Korea
Full Contact Championship	6-sided cage	India India
GMC	8-sided cage	Germany
RINGS	Ring	Japan
Super Fighting League	8-sided cage (Has used 6-sided cage)	India
UFC	8-sided cage	(United States) USA
URCC	Ring	Philippines
XFC	8-sided cage	(United States) USA
World Series of Fighting	10-sided cage	(United States) USA
ZST	Ring	Japan
Superior Challenge	8-sided cage	Sweden
One Pride MMA_{(id)}	8-sided cage	Indonesia
Ultimate Warrior Challenge Mexico	6-sided cage	Mexico

Defunct organizations:

Organization	Cage or Ring	Primary Event Location
Affliction Entertainment	Ring	(United States) USA
Art of War FC	Ring	China
Dream	Ring (Had used 6-sided cage)	Japan
EliteXC	8-sided cage (Had used circular cage)	(United States) USA
K-1 Hero's	Ring	Japan
IFL	Ring (Had intended to use 6-sided ring)	(United States) USA
Legend FC (Hong Kong)	Ring	Hong Kong
Pride FC	Ring	Japan
Strikeforce	6-sided cage	(United States) USA
WEC	8-sided cage (Had used 5-sided cage)	(United States) USA
World Victory Road	Ring	Japan

== Amateur MMA rules ==
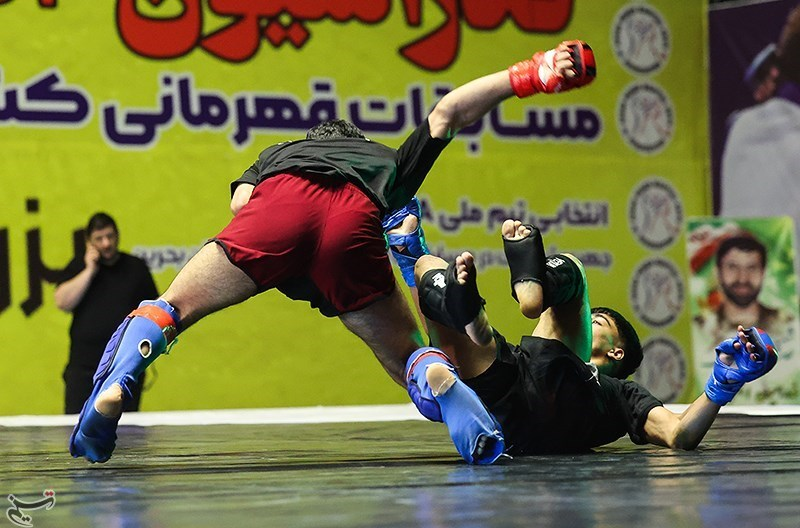
Amateur MMA on open mat

The International Mixed Martial Arts Federation (IMMAF) was founded on February 29, 2012, as the worldwide organization for amateur mixed martial arts. Just like in pro MMA, all fights happen in a cage.

UWW and Asian Mixed Martial Arts Association promote amateur MMA with their own set of rules, featuring matches on open mats.Global Association of Mixed Martial Arts uses both cage and open mat (tatami).

=== Protection gear ===
Competitors shall wear UWW approved head guards, gloves, knee pads and shin-instep guards of their assigned red or blue colour. They shall also wear personal groin and mouth guards.

Female competitors may wear a chest protector. Protection gear may not contain any metal part whatsoever.

The protection gear shall be in a generally clean and serviceable condition and the padding shall not be displaced, broken or imperfect in any way.

== See also ==
- Combat sport
