= Kumite Classic Entertainment =

American sports production company

- Type: Private
- Industry: Sports, fitness, martial arts
- Founded: 1999
- Founder: Bill Viola Jr
- Headquarters: Pittsburgh, PA
- Subsidiaries: Allegheny Shotokan Karate
- Website: kumiteclassic.com

Kumite Classic Entertainment (KCE) is a Pittsburgh, Pennsylvania based sports production company. It was established in 1999 by Bill Viola Jr. KCE specializes in fitness, martial arts, and multi-sport competitions.

== The Kumite Classic ==
“Kumite” is a Japanese term meaning “fighting.” The company's flagship event, the “Kumite Classic,” is an annual series of combat sports tournaments, widely recognized as a hub for martial arts in the Pittsburgh area.

The Kumite Classic includes diverse competitions such as strongman, powerlifting, bodybuilding, fitness, figure, and model contests. It also features traditional and open tournaments in karate, tae kwon do, tang soo do, kung fu, Brazilian Jiu-Jitsu, and Grappling.

Prominent figures from martial arts and sports, including Royce Gracie, Franco Harris, Antonio Brown, Lynn Swann, Ice-T, and Kurt Angle, have graced the Kumite Classic. Angle’s “Ultimate Teen Challenge,” a strength competition, debuted at the 2005 Kumite Classic and later expanded to the Arnold Sports Festival.

In 2016, Kumite Classic Entertainment acquired ownership of Allegheny Shotokan Karate.

== Pittsburgh Fitness Expo ==
Kumite Classic hosts the annual Pittsburgh Fitness Expo, a full scale consumer convention that promotes health and wellness in the Western Pennsylvania region. The expo is held at the Monroeville Convention Center over Memorial Day Weekend.

== Publishing ==
In 2013, the company established Kumite Classic Press and released Godfathers of MMA, a mixed martial arts non-fiction book inspired by the life of Bill Viola Sr. and the rise and fall of CV Productions and the Tough Guy Contest. The book is the subject of the documentary film Tough Guys (2017) produced by MinusL Inc.

Kumite Classic published a commemorative edition of Godfather's of MMA retitled Tough Guys (2017) which peaked at #1 on the Amazon best sellers list in the individual sports category. The launch was synchronized with the network television debut of Tough Guys on Showtime.

== Published works ==
- Viola Jr., Bill (2014). Godfathers of MMA: The Birth of an American Sport. Kumite Classic Entertainment.ISBN 978-0-9961633-0-9
- Viola Jr., Bill (2016). Go Ask Your Dad: Questions, Answers, and Stories about Fathers, Fatherhood, and Being a Parent (Volume 1). Kumite Classic Entertainment. ISBN 978-0996163316
- Viola Jr., Bill (2017). Tough Guys. Kumite Classic Entertainment. ISBN 978-0-9961633-3-0
- Viola Jr., Bill (2020). CommonSensei: Sensei Says. Kumite Classic Entertainment. ISBN 978-0-9961633-4-7
- Viola Jr., Bill (2020). CommonSensei: Goal Pagoda. Kumite Classic Entertainment. ISBN 978-0-9961633-5-4
