= Tough Guys (2017 film) =

Mixed martial arts documentary

- Directed by: Henry Roosevelt, W.B. Zullo
- Produced by: Craig DiBiase
- Starring: Bill Viola, Frank Caliguri
- Production company: MinusL
- Release date: June 15, 2017 (AFI Film Festival)
- Running time: 77 minutes
- Country: United States
- Language: English

Tough Guys is a 2017 documentary film that explores the development of mixed martial arts as a mainstream sporting event in the United States from 1979-1983. The principal characters are Bill Viola and Frank Caliguri, who founded CV Productions together. The film made its debut at the AFI Film Festival of 2017. Its first network television showing premiered on Showtime, September 15, 2017. Filming took place at 18 locations throughout Pennsylvania, New York, and Florida including Allegheny Shotokan Karate and Denny's restaurant.

== Synopsis ==
In 1979, more than a decade before the Ultimate Fighting Championship (UFC), CV Productions created a new sport that involved an anything-goes fight league that recruited street fighters, wrestlers, martial artists, boxers and brawlers. The film chronicles the Tough Guys' first bouts and the cast of fighters who stepped into the ring. The film documents the Tough Guy vs Toughman controversy.

In the documentary, CV Productions becomes subject to political scrutiny that sparked a chain of events ending in the passage of the Tough Guy Law, Senate Bill 632, the first mixed martial arts ban in the nation. The sport then remained dormant until the UFC resurrected the concept in 1993.

== Background ==
Tough Guys was inspired by the book Godfathers of MMA published by Kumite Classic Entertainment and written by Bill Viola Jr and Dr. Fred Adams. The book was featured in The Tough Guys exhibit at the Heinz History Center, which recognized Viola and Califuri as the co-creators of MMA, and caught the attention of Pittsburgh Post-Gazette reporter Robert Zullo. After Zullo read the book, he connected Bill Viola with MinusL productions to produce a film about the history of MMA. Viola Jr. also re-released an updated version of his book re-titled and re-branded as “Tough Guys” to coincide with the film's release.
