= Tough Guys (disambiguation) =

Tough Guys is a 1986 American action comedy film.

Tough Guys may also refer to:

- Tough Guys (1960 film), an Italian comedy film
- Three Tough Guys, also known as Tough Guys, a 1974 crime-action film
- "Tough Guys," a song on REO Speedwagon's 1980 album, Hi Infidelity
- Tough Guys (2017 film), a documentary film
- Tough Guys (book), a non-fiction mixed martial arts book
