= Allegheny Shotokan Karate =

Karate school in Pittsburgh

- Also known as: Viola Karate
- Date founded: 1969
- Country of origin: United States
- Founder: Bill Viola Sr.
- Current head: Bill Viola Jr.
- Arts taught: Shotokan • Mixed martial arts • Kickboxing • Kobudo • Jujutsu
- Official website: www.alleghenyshotokan.com

Allegheny Shotokan Karate is a Western Pennsylvania-based martial arts school established in 1969 in Pittsburgh, Pennsylvania. The dojo was founded by Bill Viola Sr., who the Heinz History Center references as a co-creator of the modern sport of mixed martial arts. The school is currently located in Irwin, Pennsylvania, North Huntingdon Township and operates under the name "Viola Karate."

== History ==
The name "Allegheny" represents the school’s first location in Allegheny County (East Allegheny School District), located in the Greater Pittsburgh area. Shotokan is the base style of Japanese Karate taught with an emphasis on mixed martial arts and kickboxing. The dojo was founded on the traditional principles of the Japan Karate Association (JKA) and later became affiliated with Robert Trias and George Anderson under the United States Karate Association.

== Competition ==
USA Karate team members Jack Bodell, Richard Sowash, and Doug Selchan began their training at the school. Selchan went on the win a Gold Medal the 1999 Pan-American Games for the United States. Bodell later became a member of the United States Secret Service responsible for the protection of President Jimmy Carter.

In 1998, the school was honored by Arnold Schwarzenegger as the top Martial Arts team in the United States at the Arnold Sports Festival. Positive Athlete Pittsburgh has also honored Allegheny Shotokan karate members with the Hines Ward Positive Athlete Award for martial arts.

The school is home to Team “Kumite,” an all-star competition team coached by Bill Viola Jr.

== Mixed martial arts ==
In the 1970s, Allegheny Shotokan established open “fight nights” at its Pennsylvania Turtle Creek dojo. Students from various styles of martial arts were invited to train together and share knowledge in what was called “combined fighting” and the workouts attracted local judo, jujutsu, wrestling, kung fu, boxing, kickboxing and karate instructors.

The collaboration inspired modern day mixed martial arts at the Tough Guy Contest, founded by the school's parent company, CV Productions, Inc. Viola enlisted his students Jack Bodell and PKA Heavyweight kickboxing champion Jacquet Bazemore as referees for the Tough Guy Contest. A series of mock mixed martial arts bouts took place at the Allegheny Shotokan dojo to practice the rules and regulations of the new sport. On March 20, 1980, Allegheny Shotokan Karate member Dave Jones of Irwin, Pennsylvania represented the school in the first Tough Guy Contest by recording a TKO victory over Mike Murray of Vandergrift in the 3rd round. The sport was banned in 1983 with the passage of the Tough Guy Law.

The Heinz History Center Western Pennsylvania Sports Museum, in conjunction with the Smithsonian Institution, unveiled an exhibit on June 23, 2011, documenting the first mixed martial arts league in the United States. The display included recognition of Allegheny Shotokan Karate.

Bill Viola Sr., Jack Bodell, Jacquet Bazemore and Dave Jones' influence on mixed martial arts is recognized in the book, Godfathers of MMA. The book is the inspiration of the documentary film, Tough Guys (2017).

== See also ==
- USA National Karate-do Federation
- World Association of Kickboxing Organizations
