= Mixed martial arts in the United States =

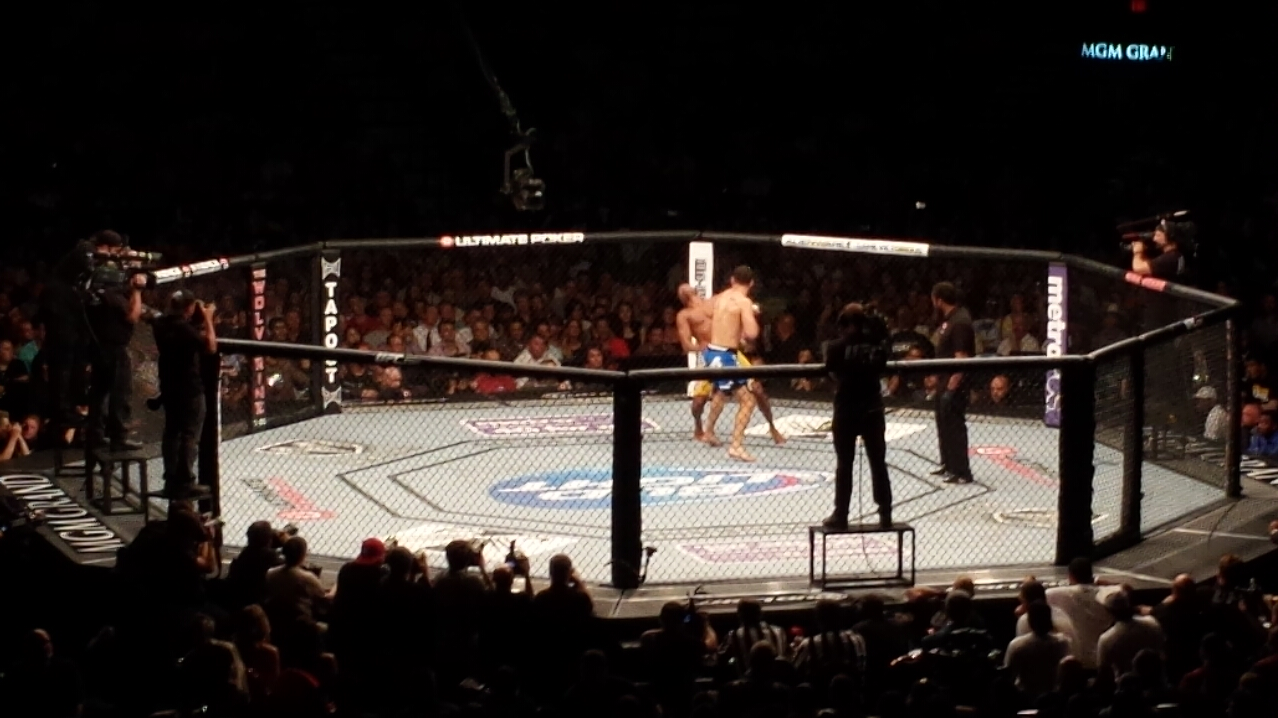
- Country: United States
- Governing body: USA Mixed Martial Arts Federation
- National team: United States

Audience records
- Single match: 20,427 (UFC 205)

Mixed martial arts (MMA) is the fastest growing spectator sport, in terms of finances, in the United States. The modern form of MMA largely developed in the 1990s, and evolved into a sport that enjoys worldwide recognition in the early 21st century. Many companies promote MMA cards, with the American-based Ultimate Fighting Championship (UFC) the most dominant.

== History ==
=== Precursors of modern MMA ===
During the late 1960s to early 1970s, the concept of combining the elements of multiple martial arts was popularized in the West by Chinese-American martial artist Bruce Lee via his system of Jeet Kune Do. Lee believed that "the best fighter is not a Boxer, Karate or Judo man. The best fighter is someone who can adapt to any style, to be formless, to adopt an individual's own style and not following the system of styles." In 2004, UFC President Dana White would call Lee the "father of mixed martial arts" stating: "If you look at the way Bruce Lee trained, the way he fought, and many of the things he wrote, he said the perfect style was no style. You take a little something from everything. You take the good things from every different discipline, use what works, and you throw the rest away".

Gene Lebell v. Milo Savage, a judoka and a boxer respectively, was thought to be one of the earliest examples of style vs style fight in the United States.

Regulated inter-stylistic competitions were introduced in the United States by CV Productions, Inc. Its first competition, called Tough Guy Contest was held on March 20, 1980, New Kensington, Pennsylvania, Holiday Inn. During that year the company renamed the brand to Super Fighters and sanctioned ten regulated tournaments in Pennsylvania. In 1983, Pennsylvania State Senate passed a bill that specifically called for: "Prohibiting Tough Guy contests or Battle of the Brawlers contests" and ended the sport.

=== Modern MMA ===
Muhammad Ali vs. Antonio Inoki took place in Japan between American boxer Muhammad Ali and Japanese wrestler Antonio Inoki in 1976. The classic match-up between professional boxer and professional wrestler turned sour as each fighter refused to engage in the other's style, and after a 15-round stalemate it was declared a draw. In the United States, the fight sold at least 2 million or more pay-per-view buys on closed-circuit theater TV, but received mixed reactions from audiences. The fight played an important role in the history of mixed martial arts. The earliest example of a modern MMA contest held in America was introduced in Pittsburgh, Penn. in 1979.

In 1993, the Gracie family introduced their form of Brazilian jiu-jitsu to the US. This led to the creation of the Ultimate Fighting Championship (UFC) and begun with the UFC 1 event, held in Denver in November 1993. The sport was initially criticized for being too violent and brutal.

The sport of mixed martial arts was banned in 1997 in New York. At one time the sport was banned in most parts of the United States, which was spearheaded by John McCain who called MMA human cockfighting.

In September 2000, the New Jersey State Athletic Control Board began to allow mixed martial arts in New Jersey. This would be the basis of Unified Rules of Mixed Martial Arts.

West Virginia became the 44th state to regulate mixed martial arts on March 24, 2011. On March 8, 2012, Wyoming became the 45th state to regulate MMA. On May 4, 2012, it was announced that Vermont had become the 46th state to regulate MMA. Legislation allowing MMA in Connecticut came into effect on October 1, 2013, making it the 47th state to regulate the sport.

On March 22, 2016, the New York State Assembly voted to lift the State's 1997 ban on MMA and on April 14, 2016, Governor Andrew Cuomo signed the bill legalizing and regulating the sport into law. New York was the last state to legalize the sport in the United States.

The two most prominent promotions are UFC and Bellator (Up until the PFL bought Bellator in 2023.). Other promotions include: Professional Fighters League in Washington, D.C., Cage Fury Fighting Championships in New Jersey, King of the Cage in Southern California, Resurrection Fighting Alliance in Kearney, Nebraska, Legacy Fighting Championships based out of Houston, Texas, Titan Fighting Championship based out of Kansas City, Kansas.

== Women's MMA ==
The first recorded American female competition was at an IFC 4 on March 28, 1997. This was soon followed by an IFC four women tournament sanctioned by the Louisiana Boxing and Wrestling Commission on September 5, 1997, in Baton Rouge.

All female Mixed Martial Arts Organization Invicta FC is based out of Enka, North Carolina.

== Television ==
The UFC is the most popular MMA organization in the United States and is broadcast on ESPN. Its major rival for viewers is PFL which is broadcast on ESPN.

== Literature ==
- No Holds Barred: The Complete History of MMA in America by Clyde Gentry (ISBN 9781600785450)

== See also ==
- Mixed martial arts in New York
