= Ring name =

Stage name used by a professional wrestler, mixed martial artist or boxer

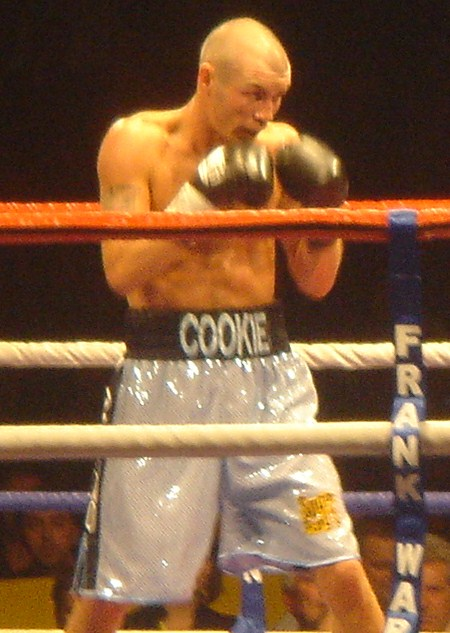
English boxer Nicky Cook with his ring name "Cookie" on the trunks.

A ring name is a type of stage name or nickname used by an athlete such as a professional wrestler, mixed martial artist, or boxer whose real name is considered unattractive, dull, difficult to pronounce or spell, amusing for the wrong reasons, or projecting the wrong image. Since the advent of the Internet, it has been relatively easy to discover a fighter's real name.

== Professional wrestling ==
Ring names are much more common in professional wrestling than any other sport; famous examples include Terry Bollea becoming Hulk Hogan, Shawn Hickenbottom becoming Shawn Michaels, Christopher Irvine becoming Chris Jericho, and Phillip Brooks becoming CM Punk. A number of wrestlers adopted their real name or a variation of it, sometimes modifying the spelling to better fit their gimmick, such as Dave Bautista becoming Batista (later reverting to his real name for his Hollywood acting career), Patricia Stratigeas becoming Trish Stratus, Bryan Danielson becoming Daniel Bryan (when he wrestled in WWE), and Richard Fliehr becoming Ric Flair. Others simply use part of their name, such as Bill Goldberg using Goldberg, Mike Mizanin using The Miz, and Michael Wardlow using Wardlow. While not as common now, female wrestlers have been known to go by just a first name for their ring name. An example of that would be Maria Kanellis being simply known as Maria during her first stint in WWE. It is also common for wrestlers of all genders to use a nickname in addition to their real name for marketability and other reasons. Ricky Steamboat is an atypical instance of a wrestler adopting a ring name to sound less intimidating, as his legal name of Richard Blood was considered unfitting for his babyface persona.

Some (mostly independent) wrestlers still go to great lengths to ensure that their real names are not publicly known. It is a highly respected tradition in Mexican lucha libre for performers to hide their true identities, usually wrestling under masks, and revealing a luchador's identity without their permission is considered a serious offence with real-life consequences. Professional wrestlers are often referred to by their contemporaries by their ring name. In interviews, Bret Hart regularly referred to Mark Calaway, Curt Hennig, and Kevin Nash by their ring names (The Undertaker, Mr. Perfect, and Diesel). Ring names are often trademarked by the promotion that creates a character or gimmick for a performer. It is common to see one performer use a variety of ring names throughout their career, even if their overall persona remains similar.

This is especially true in WWE, which has largely forced most wrestlers that have debuted since 2006 to use a WWE-owned ring name instead of a ring name that they used on the independent circuit or, such as with Daniel Bryan and a few others, their real name. One notable exception was made for David Otunga because of his real marriage to singer Jennifer Hudson at the time, which gave WWE some mainstream exposure.

Low Ki used the alias "Senshi" during his second TNA stint to reserve his primary ring name for other use. A similar example is the team known as The Dudley Boyz in ECW and WWE and Team 3D elsewhere. WWE trademarked the "Dudley Boyz" name, leading them to have to change their name when they went to TNA. The members' individual names were also trademarked by WWE, forcing them to have to change their names. WWE partially repealed the policy in 2015, allowing wrestlers who were well known in other promotions such as Samoa Joe, A.J. Styles, Shinsuke Nakamura, Austin Aries, Bobby Roode, and Eric Young to use their long-standing ring names (or, in Nakamura's and Roode's cases, their real names) as well as wrestlers who sign "Tier 2" NXT brand contracts such as Johnny Gargano and Tommaso Ciampa, who wrestle both on NXT and the independent circuit to keep their ring names (or, in Gargano's case, his real name). Gargano and Ciampa have since signed exclusive WWE contracts. "In-house" WWE wrestlers still use WWE-owned ring names.

In rare cases, the rights to a wrestler's ring name may be owned by a company with little or no connection to professional wrestling, such as Marvel Comics' ownership of the name Hulk Hogan until early 2003, which was due to Hogan being advertised as "The Incredible Hulk Hogan" early in his career, while Marvel owned the trademark for their comic book character. Sometimes, a wrestler will buy the rights to their own ring name; for example, Steve Borden owns the rights to the name Sting and licenses it to the musician of the same name. The wrestler formerly known as Test took this one step further and legally changed his name to "Andrew Test Martin". Jim Hellwig, known as The Ultimate Warrior, had his name legally changed to simply "Warrior".

In many cases, ring names evolve over time as the wrestler's gimmick changes, either subtly or dramatically. After debuting in WWE as the "Connecticut Blueblood" Hunter Hearst Helmsley, Paul Levesque's character later morphed into Triple H. A more drastic change sometimes occurs when a wrestler turns heroic or villainous, such as when Hulk Hogan joined the villainous nWo (New World Order) and became "Hollywood" Hulk Hogan. His new attitude was enhanced by changing his costume color scheme from his famous red and yellow to nWo's black and white. Steve Williams adopted the ring name Steve Austin to avoid confusion with the then-more established performer "Dr. Death" Steve Williams. Austin would wrestle under that name for several years before signing with the WWF and being given the name "the Ringmaster". This gimmick failed to catch on, and Austin reverted to his established name, reaching his greatest level of success with the prefix "Stone Cold" Steve Austin.

== Boxing ==
Numerous boxers have used ring names or nicknames as their mode of identification during their professional boxing careers, particularly during the late 19th century and the early 20th century. The ring name "Kid" was particularly popular, indicating the boxer's comparative youth. Since the mid 20th century, ring names for boxers have typically been less common, although nicknames have become more popular in recent years. Famous examples of boxers who used ring names include:

- Kid Azteca
- Kid Chocolate
- Kid Diamond
- Kid Gavilan
- Kid Meza
- Kid Paret
- Jack Kid Berg
- Ted Kid Lewis
- Jersey Joe Walcott
- Joey Giardello
- Rocky Marciano
- Rocky Graziano
- Takaloo
- Steve Hearon

== Global use ==
- In Japan, sumo wrestlers use a ring name called shikona (Japanese: 四股名 or 醜名). Other martial artists use 'martial names' or 'warrior names' called Bugō.
- In Mexico, Puerto Rico, and other parts of Hispanic America, professional wrestlers use ring names and conceal their identities with masks.
- In Latin America, boxers often use nicknames alongside their real names, and both may be used each time they are introduced. Examples include Wilfred "El Radar" Benítez, Wilfredo "Bazooka" Gómez, and Alexis "El Flaco Explosivo" Argüello.
- In Thailand, both professional boxers and Muay Thai kickboxers tend to use their stable or gym name as the last part of their ring name, for example Khaosai Galaxy, Khaokor Galaxy, Sot Chitalada, Samart Payakaroon, Kongtoranee Payakaroon, Namphon Nongkee Pahuyuth, Namkabuan Nongkee Pahuyuth, Ratanapol Sor Vorapin, Ratanachai Sor Vorapin, Saen Sor Ploenchit, Chatchai Singwangcha, Saman Sorjaturong, Veeraphol Nakornlouang Promotion, Nawaphon Nakornloung Promotion. Also the names of commercial brands have been introduced as fighters' last name, as part of sponsorship deals. These names are liable to change if the brand sponsoring the fighter changes. Examples of fighters who have taken the name of their commercial sponsor are Samson Dutch Boy Gym, Yodsanan 3-K Battery, Poonsawat Kratingdaenggym, Teerachai Kratingdaenggym, Knockout CP Freshmart.

== See also ==
- Stage name
- Code name
- Aviator call sign
- Nickname
- Pseudonym
- Shikona
