= Bill Viola Jr =

American martial artist

Bill Viola Jr.
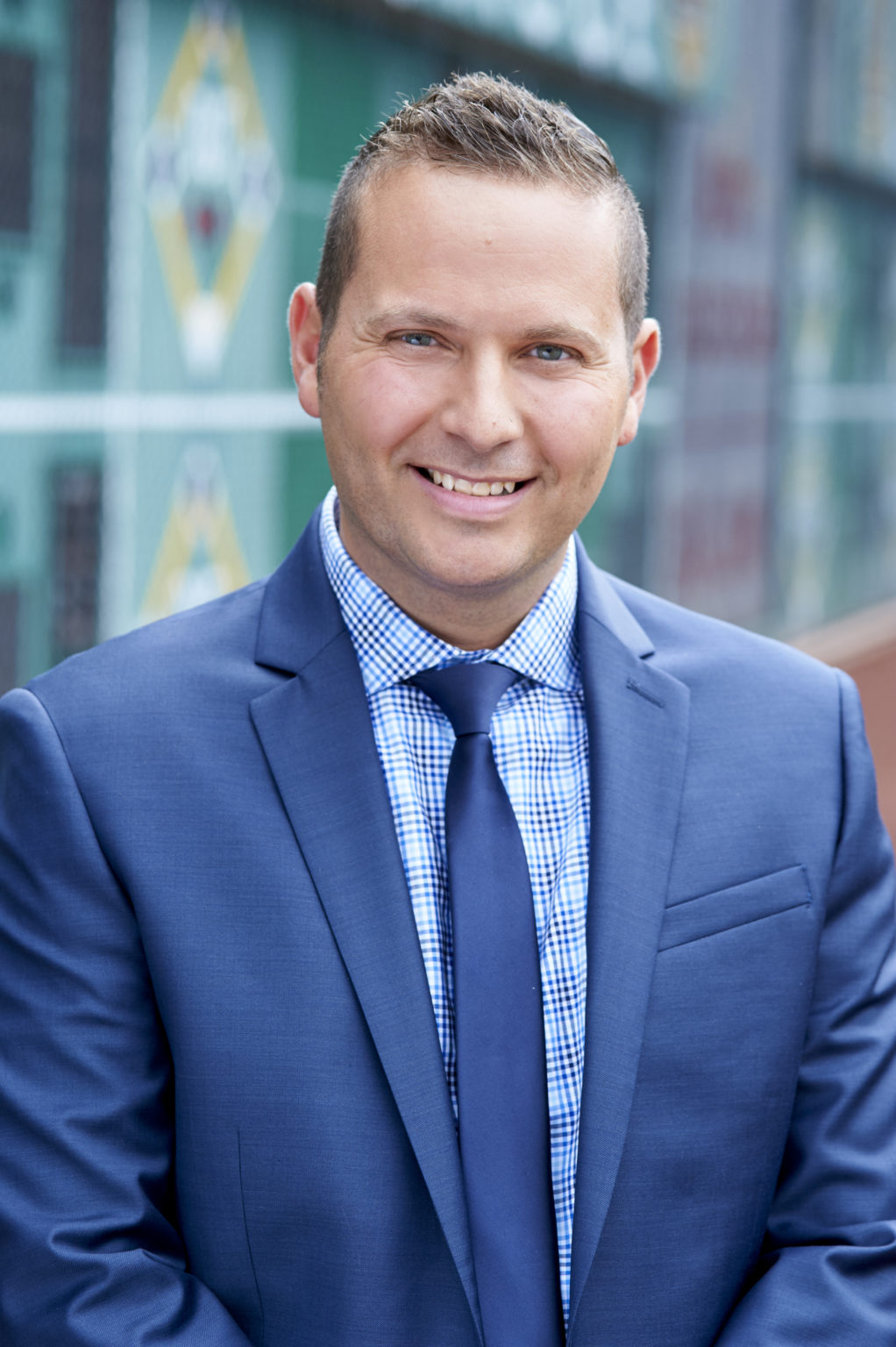
- Born: William Viola III; April 9, 1977 (age 49); Irwin, PA
- Education: University of Pittsburgh
- Occupations: Martial artist, author
- Organization(s): President: Kumite Classic Entertainment, Owner: Allegheny Shotokan Karate
- Notable work: Tough Guys, Showtime film Tough Guys
- Children: Gabriella "Gabby" Viola
- Parent: Bill Viola Sr.

William Viola Jr. (born April 9, 1977) is an international martial arts champion, promoter and author. He is the producer and founder of the Pittsburgh, Pennsylvania based Kumite Classic.

== Personal life ==
Bill Viola Jr. was born in North Huntingdon, Pennsylvania. He was introduced to the art of Shotokan Karate by his father Bill Viola Sr. who is the founder of Allegheny Shotokan Karate and co-creator of the modern sport of MMA. Viola Jr. followed in his father's footsteps beginning martial arts lessons at the age of 3.

Viola's daughter, Gabriella "Gabby" Viola, is a third-generation martial artist and world champion who competes internationally in karate and kickboxing, with Viola serving as her coach and sensei. She has represented WAKO Team USA in international competition, including the WAKO Junior World Championships, and has also represented the U.S. Army Fight Team. In 2025, she won the 12–14 Black Belt Open Weight Grand Championship at the WAKO USA National Championships and earned nine gold medals at the ICO World Championships. Her competitive career and continuation of the Viola family's three-generation martial arts tradition have also been profiled by the Pittsburgh Post-Gazette and Tribune-Review.

== Career ==
In 2019, the city of Pittsburgh named September 23 as "Sensei Viola Day" recognizing the Viola Family for their 50-year dojo anniversary. The date was symbolic as it was Viola Jr.’s son's William Viola IV's birthday.

In 2023, Bill Viola Jr. was appointed chairman of Tatami Sports for WAKO USA (USA Kickboxing). Viola later brokered a partnership between WAKO USA, the Kumite Classic and the Arnold Sports Festival to stage the WAKO USA National Championships in Columbus, Ohio. The championships were held as part of the 2025 Arnold Sports Festival, alongside the 25th-anniversary edition of the Kumite Classic. Viola's connection to the Arnold Sports Festival began during his competitive career. While attending the University of Pittsburgh, he won gold at an Arnold event and subsequently met Arnold Schwarzenegger, an experience that helped inspire his later development of the Kumite Classic.

=== Competition retirement ===
In the summer of 1999, Viola was involved in an automobile accident on US Route 30 in North Huntingdon, Pennsylvania. He sustained a serious cervical neck fracture injury that effectively ended his competitive karate career (1981–1999).

=== Coaching ===
Viola has remained active in martial arts serving as head coach of "Team Kumite," an all-star karate team based in Pittsburgh, Pennsylvania. The team is noted as the most successful sport karate competition team in the Pittsburgh region, winning 12 National Black Belt League (NBL) World titles in 2013.

=== Kumite Classic Entertainment ===
Viola graduated summa cum laude from the University of Pittsburgh in 1999 and moved to Hollywood, California, to work in the entertainment industry. He earned acceptance into the Screen Actors Guild (SAG) and American Federation of Television and Radio (AFTRA). After working with top industry professionals he established his own production company, Kumite Classic Entertainment in 1999. The company's signature event is the annual self-titled Kumite Classic, a multi-sport and fitness expo in Pittsburgh, Pennsylvania.

Viola has worked as a consultant for a number of major motion pictures, including Warrior (2011). He is credited as an associate producer for the mixed martial arts-inspired film Tapped Out (2014).

=== Author ===
Viola is the co-author of the mixed martial arts-inspired Tough Guys. The book chronicles CV Productions, Inc., the first mixed martial arts league in America and the introduction of the Tough Guy Contest.

Godfathers of MMA is the subject of the documentary film Tough Guys (2016) produced by MinusL Inc.

He established Kumite Quarterly Magazine in 2003. It was published until 2007. As a freelance journalist, he was contracted by Sport Karate Magazine to cover The National Black Belt League World Games on location in Canada, Mexico and across the United States.

The commemorative release of Tough Guys (2017) peaked at No. 1 on Amazon sports category coinciding with the Showtime film Tough Guys debut.

In 2016, Viola created the Sensei Says educational curriculum and was awarded a Federal Trademark for the courses.

=== Producer ===
Viola Jr. was an associate producer of the documentary film Tough Guys. It was broadcast on Showtime in 2017. Viola made a cameo in Tough Guys playing his father.

He has co-produced and worked as a consultant on several films: Warrior (2011), Tapped Out (2014), Gridlocked (2015), and The Sound (2017).

== Filmography ==
Year	Film	Notes
2011	Warrior	Consultant
2014	Tapped Out	Associate Producer
2015	Gridlocked	Associate Producer
2015	The Sound	Producer
2017	Tough Guys	Associate Producer

== Bibliography ==
- Viola Jr., Bill (2014). Godfathers of MMA: The Birth of an American Sport. Kumite Classic Entertainment.ISBN 978-0-9961633-0-9
- Viola Jr., Bill (2016). Go Ask Your Dad: Questions, Answers, and Stories about Fathers, Fatherhood, and Being a Parent (Volume 1). Kumite Classic Entertainment. ISBN 978-0996163316
- Viola Jr., Bill (2017). Tough Guys. Kumite Classic Entertainment. ISBN 978-0-9961633-3-0
- Viola Jr., Bill (2020). CommonSensei: Sensei Says. Kumite Classic Entertainment. ISBN 978-0-9961633-4-7
- Viola Jr., Bill (2020). CommonSensei: Goal Pagoda. Kumite Classic Entertainment. ISBN 978-0-9961633-5-4
