= Toughman Contest (video game) =

1995 video game

- Developers: Visual Concepts; High Score Productions
- Publisher: EA Sports
- Composer: Brian Schimdt
- Platforms: Sega Genesis, 32X
- Release: Genesis: NA/EU: March 1995; 32X: NA: May 1995; EU: 1995
- Genre: Sports
- Modes: Single-player, multiplayer

Toughman Contest is a boxing video game for the Sega Genesis and 32X. It is based on the Toughman Contest, and features Eric "Butterbean" Esch on the cover and as the game's final boss. The game was released in 1995. It received mixed reviews, generally criticizing the sluggishness of the gameplay while praising the selection of special moves.

== Gameplay ==
The game is based on the Toughman Contest, an amateur boxing competition on American television. It features Eric "Butterbean" Esch as the cover character as well as the game's final boss. Players have to win boxing matches against their opponents. Each match is composed of three one-minute rounds, and there are 24 different characters in the game from which to choose. Each player can throw various punches, such as jabs, uppercuts, and hooks. The player's character also has three "special punches": the Super Uppercut, Windmill Wind-up, and Popeye Punch. If the player is losing, they also have the option to throw in the towel.

== Reception ==
Reception

Review scores
Publication	Score
Consoles +	90% (GEN)
Computer and Video Games	69/100 (GEN)
Electronic Gaming Monthly	8/10 (GEN); 7.75/10 (32X)
Hyper	80/100 (32X)
Mean Machines Sega	64/100 (32X)
Next Generation	3/5 (GEN)
Player One	85% (GEN)
VideoGames & Computer Entertainment	7/10 (32X); 9/10 (GEN)
Games World	82% (32X)

GamePro gave the Genesis version a rave review, commenting that the game has clean and well-animated graphics, bizarre and humorous background animations, a surprising selection of special moves, and an enjoyable two-player mode. The two sports reviewers of Electronic Gaming Monthly both gave it an 8 out of 10. They praised the special moves, combos, tough enemy AI, and high level of strategy required to win the game. They also ran a side-by-side comparison with the similar Super Punch-Out!!. They declared Toughman Contest the better of the two games, citing its better replay value, stronger AI, and the fact that opponents do not signal their moves ahead of time. Next Generation stated that "the minimal length of the fights and the one dimensional, fuzzy graphics leave this title a few pounds short of the heavyweight title."

Electronic Gaming Monthly reviewed the 32X version with similar praise, though one of the reviewers complained that the only changes made from the Genesis version are improved graphics and sounds, and lowered his score half a point to a 7.5 out of 10. GamePro similarly commented that "Toughman is the same great game on the 32X that it is on the Genesis. Only a few noticeable enhancements separate them." They further criticized it for removing the humorous background animations of the Genesis version, but nonetheless concluded that 32X owners who don't already have the Genesis version should get the 32X version instead. Two reviewers for Mean Machines Sega scored the game 64 out of 100 points, with the reviewers criticizing the lack of responsiveness to the controls and sluggish gameplay. Computer and Video Games said the sluggishness of the game makes the game more frustrating and difficult.

== See also ==
- Foreman For Real
