= Andrew E. Masich =

Andrew Edward Masich (born February 7, 1955) is the president and CEO of the Senator John Heinz History Center, an affiliate museum of the Smithsonian Institution. Masich was previously Chairman of the Pennsylvania Historical and Museum Commission (2011–2016).

== Early life and career ==
Born February 7, 1955, in Yonkers, New York, Masich's family moved to Tucson, Arizona in 1971. He graduated from Canyon del Oro High School in 1973 and went on to earn a BA as a double major in History and Anthropology in 1977 and an MA in history from the University of Arizona in 1984. He served as director of the Arizona Historical Society's Rio Colorado Division in Yuma from 1978 to 1985, then as the director of the Central Arizona Division in Phoenix from 1985 to 1990. From 1990 to 1998 he served as vice president of the Colorado Historical Society (now History Colorado), the state's official history agency. Masich also holds a PhD in history from Carnegie Mellon University.

== Academic and museum career ==
Masich is an adjunct history faculty member at Carnegie Mellon University teaching American History and Public History courses.

Masich oversees the operation of the 350,000-square-foot Senator John Heinz History Center, located in the 1898 Chautauqua Lake Ice Company warehouse in downtown Pittsburgh. In 1999, he forged a strategic partnership with the Smithsonian Institution. During Masich's tenure, the Heinz History Center has formed long-term partnerships to manage other regional museums and historical organizations, including the Fort Pitt Museum, Meadowcroft Rockshelter and Historic Village, The Westinghouse Museum, and the Pittsburgh Police Historical Association. Through its Affiliates Program, the History Center partners with and offers assistance to 125 additional museums and historical societies in Western Pennsylvania.

Masich serves on the steering committee of History Made By Us, a national coalition of museums that inspires young Americans to learn more about civics and history in advance of America's 250th birthday in 2026.

He has appeared on the History Channel, Travel Channel, and other national networks as an expert on Pittsburgh history.

Masich records a podcast called "KDKA Radio Time Capsule" for KDKA-AM radio in Pittsburgh.

== Books by Andrew E. Masich ==
- Cheyenne Dog Soldiers: A Ledgerbook History of Coups and Combat, with David F. Halaas, et al., University Press of Colorado (1997).
- Halfbreed: The Remarkable True Story of George Bent: Caught Between the Worlds of the Indian and the White Man, with David F. Halaas, DaCapo Press (2004).
- The Civil War in Arizona: The Story of the California Volunteers, 1861–1865, 2nd ed., Norman: University of Oklahoma Press, 2008. ISBN 978-0806139005. OCLC 181603435.
- Dan Rooney: My 75 Years with the Pittsburgh Steelers and the NFL, with David F. Halaas and Dan Rooney, DaCapo Press (2007).
- Civil War in the Southwest Borderlands, 1861–1867, University of Oklahoma Press (2017).
