= Tough Guys (book) =

2017 book

- Author: Bill Viola Jr, Dr. Fred Adams
- Language: English
- Genre: Mixed Martial Arts
- Published: 2017
- Publisher: Kumite Classic Entertainment
- Publication place: United States
- Media type: Print, Kindle
- Pages: 447
- ISBN: 978-0-9961633-0-9

Tough Guys is non-fiction mixed martial arts book inspired by CV Productions Inc., and the Tough Guy Contest. The book was written by Bill Viola Jr., and Dr. Fred Adams and published by Kumite Classic Entertainment in 2017. It was the basis for the 2017 film Tough Guys which made its network television debut on Showtime.

== Background ==
Tough Guys was originally published under the title Godfathers of MMA (2014). The Heinz History Center, an affiliate of the Smithsonian Institution, discovered the book and subsequently established a permanent exhibit to recognize Pittsburgh as the birthplace of modern sport of MMA in the Western Pennsylvania Sports Museum.

New York based MinusL Productions secured the rights to produce a documentary film about the history of MMA and used the book as the basis for the film named Tough Guys co-starring Bill Viola Sr., the author's father. Tough Guys made its world premiere June 15, 2017 at the AFI Docs Film Festival in Washington, D.C.

The book was updated and rebranded as Tough Guys (2017) and published the same day as the network television debut of Tough Guys on Showtime. The re-released commemorative edition peaked at No. 1 on the Amazon individual sports charts September, 2017.

== Summary ==
The book is a noted MMA resource and historical reference for early competition. Tough Guys documents mixed martial arts in the late 1970s-1980s. In 1979, Bill Viola Sr. and Frank Caliguri established CV Productions Inc. and created a new sport that combined martial arts, boxing, wrestling, jujutsu and various forms of combat sports. The “anything goes” Tough Guy Contest introduced regulated mixed martial arts competition to America and launched the first MMA league, later rebranded as “Super Fighters.”

Tough Guys chronicles mixed martial arts a decade before the term became popular or the Ultimate Fighting Championship (UFC) was created. It details the Toughman (boxing) vs Tough Guy (MMA) controversy, the death of Ronald Miller and the Tough Guy Law which outlawed mixed martial arts in 1983. Tough Guys documents the sports early history and legal issues with the Pennsylvania State Legislature and Pennsylvania State Athletic Commission. It concludes with the Commonwealth of Pennsylvania outlawing mixed martial arts.
