= Stephen Kinsey =

American politician (born 1958)

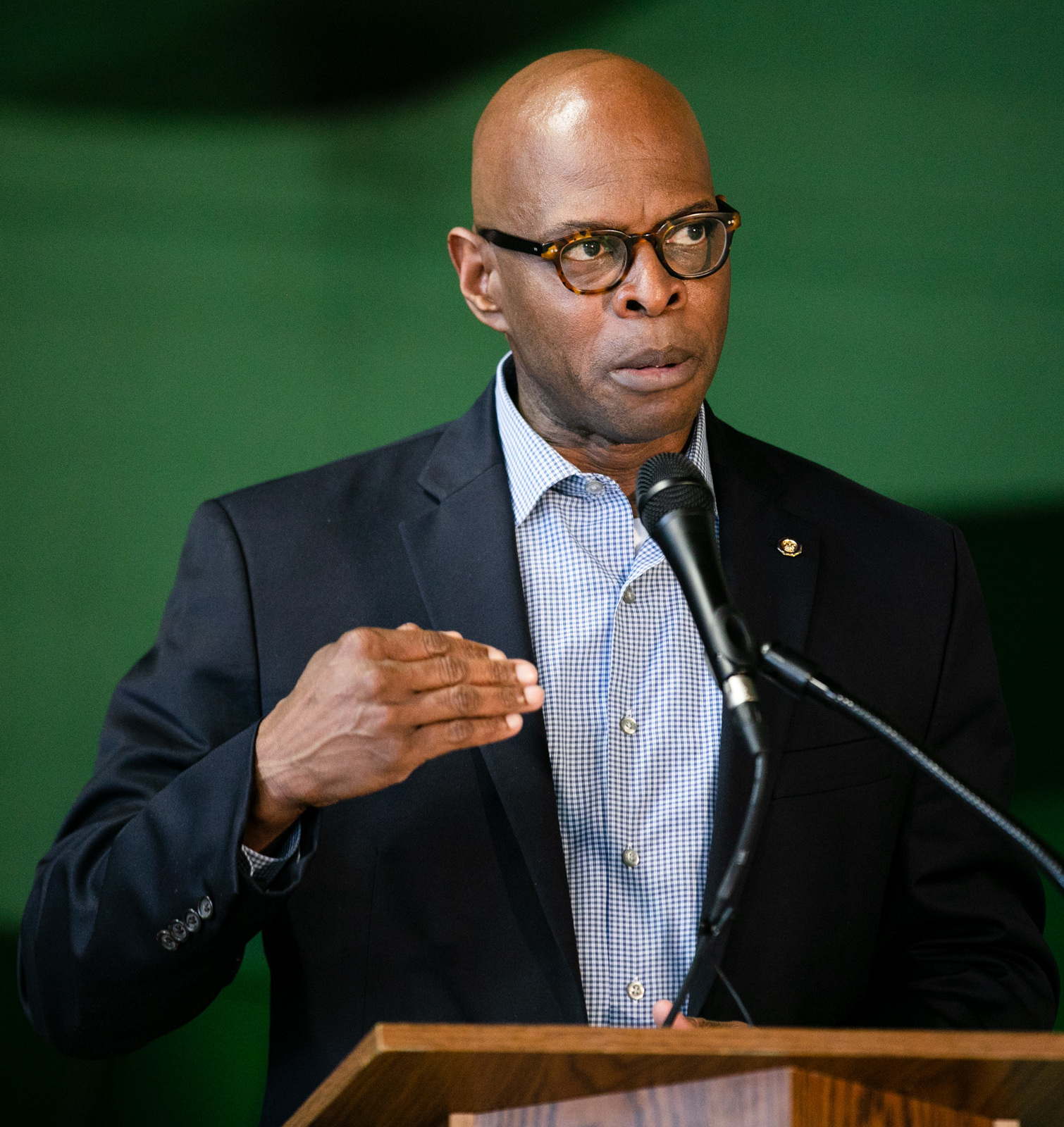

Member of the Pennsylvania House of Representatives from the 201st district
- In office January 1, 2013 – July 16, 2024
- Preceded by: John L. Myers
- Succeeded by: Andre Carroll

Personal details
- Born: December 15, 1958 (age 67) Philadelphia, Pennsylvania
- Party: Democratic
- Education: West Chester University (B.S.); Eastern University (MBA)
- Website: Campaign Website

Stephen Kinsey (born December 15, 1958) is an American politician and former Democratic Party member of the Pennsylvania House of Representatives, serving from 2013 to 2024. Kinsey had served as chief of staff to state Representative John Myers, who preceded Kinsey in office. Kinsey served as the chair of the Pennsylvania Legislative Black Caucus during the 2019-2020 legislative session.

Kinsey grew up in Philadelphia, graduating from Germantown High School in 1976. He received his Bachelor of Science in Education from West Chester University in 1981 and his Master of Business Administration from Eastern University in 2002.

Kinsey represented the 201st House District, which is located within Philadelphia and includes parts of the Germantown, Mt. Airy, West Oak Lane, and Ogontz neighborhoods. During his tenure in the House, he has served on the Appropriations, Health, Human Services, and Transportation committees.

Kinsey resigned from the Pennsylvania House in July 2024.
