= John L. Myers =

American politician

John Myers

Member of the Pennsylvania House of Representatives from the 201st district
- In office November 21, 1995 – 2013
- Preceded by: David P. Richardson
- Succeeded by: Stephen Kinsey

Personal details
- Born: October 17, 1947 Philadelphia, Pennsylvania
- Died: December 6, 2015 (aged 68) Pennsylvania, United States
- Party: Democratic
- Spouse: Joyce Myers
- Education: Lincoln University

John L. Myers (October 17, 1947 – December 6, 2015) was a Democratic member of the Pennsylvania House of Representatives, representing the 201st District. He served from 1995 through 2013.
