= Francis Rush =

American politician

Francis J. Rush

Member of the Pennsylvania House of Representatives from the 201st district
- In office 1969–1972
- Preceded by: District created
- Succeeded by: David P. Richardson

Member of the Pennsylvania House of Representatives from the Philadelphia County district
- In office 1967–1968

Personal details
- Born: May 25, 1921 Philadelphia, Pennsylvania
- Died: June 15, 1985 (aged 64) Orlando, Florida
- Party: Democratic

Francis J. Rush (May 25, 1921 – June 15, 1985) was a Democratic member of the Pennsylvania House of Representatives.
