= Andre Carroll =

American politician (born 1991)

Andre D. Carroll

Member of the Pennsylvania House of Representatives from the 201st district
- Incumbent
- Assumed office September 30, 2024
- Preceded by: Stephen Kinsey

Personal details
- Born: Andre D. Carroll; 1991 (age 34–35) Philadelphia, Pennsylvania, U.S.
- Party: Democratic
- Education: Peirce College

Andre D. Carroll (born 1991) is an American politician. He has served as the representative for the 201st district in the Pennsylvania House of Representatives since September 2024, after winning unopposed in a special election following the resignation of Stephen Kinsey.

== Early life and education ==
Carroll was born in Philadelphia. He was raised in Germantown, Philadelphia, by his grandmother due to his mother's struggle with drug addiction and his father's incarceration. Carroll came out as gay to his grandmother in his senior year at Germantown High School, where he later graduated. He received an associate degree in business administration from Peirce College.

== Political career ==
In the 2022 Pennsylvania House of Representatives election, Carroll ran in the 201st district against incumbent Stephen Kinsey in the Democratic primary. He was endorsed by city council members Isaiah Thomas and Kendra Brooks, as well as state senator Nikil Saval. He lost by a margin of 15% in the primary election.

After Kinsey announced he was retiring from the legislature, Carroll ran again for the 201st district of the Pennsylvania House of Representatives, and was ultimately unopposed in the Democratic primary. In July 2024, Kinsey resigned from the House, prompting a special election for the 201st district. Carroll ran for the special election and won unopposed; he was sworn in on September 30. He became the second gay Black man sworn into the legislature.

Carroll has criticized Philadelphia's cash bail system for allowing those with money a way out of jail. His comments came after a prospective intern was abducted and murdered by a man out on bail. Carrol has also sponsored legislation that would let incarcerated individuals make phone calls without charge.
