= Pennsylvania House of Representatives, District 201 =

American legislative district

Pennsylvania's 201st State House of Representatives district
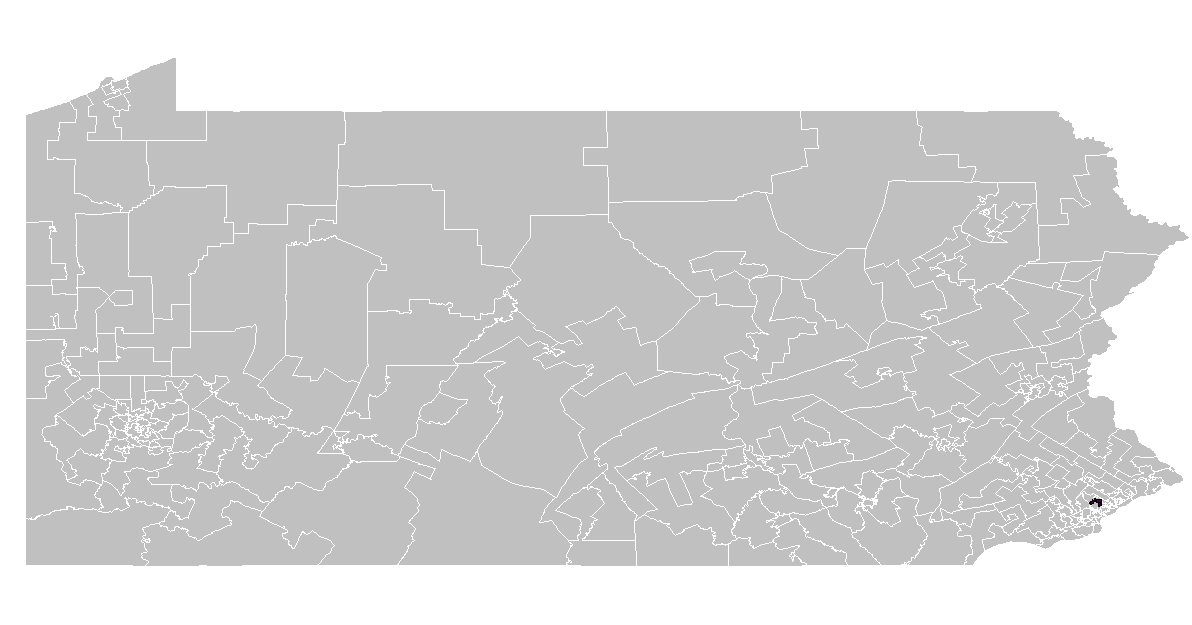
Representative
Andre Carroll; D–Philadelphia

The 201st Pennsylvania House of Representatives District is located in Philadelphia County and includes the following areas:

- Ward 17 [PART, Divisions 01, 02, 03, 04, 05, 06, 07, 08, 09, 10, 11, 12, 13, 14, 15, 17, 18, 19, 20, 26, 27 and 28]
- Ward 49 [PART, Divisions 02, 03, 04, 05, 06, 07, 08, 09, 10, 11, 12, 13, 14, 15, 16, 17, 18, 19, 20, 21 and 22]
- Ward 59

== Representatives ==
Representative	Party	Years	District home	Note
Prior to 1969, seats were apportioned by county.
Francis J. Rush	Democrat	1969 – 1972		
David P. Richardson	Democrat	1973 – 1995		Died 18 August 1995.
John L. Myers	Democrat	1995 – 2013		Elected November 7, 1995 to fill vacancy. Sworn in 21 November 1995.
Stephen Kinsey	Democrat	2013 – 2024		Resigned in 2024.
Andre Carroll	Democrat	2024 – present		Incumbent

== Recent election results ==
PA House election, 2022: Pennsylvania House of Representatives, District 201
Party	Candidate	Votes	%
Democratic	Stephen Kinsey	Unopposed	
Total votes		20,235	100.00
Democratic hold			

PA 201st legislative district special election, 2024: Pennsylvania House of Representatives, District 201
Party	Candidate	Votes	%
Democratic	Andre Carroll	Unopposed	
Total votes		3,205	100.00
Democratic hold			
