= Pennsylvania Senate Bill 632 =

Pennsylvania Senate Bill 632, often referred to as the Tough Guy Law, became a legislative act (Act 1983-62) that outlawed the sport of mixed martial arts. The Tough Guy Law was the first legal precedent for MMA in the United States, approved November 3, 1983.

== The Act ==
An Act amending the act of August 31, 1955 (P. L. 531, No. 131), entitled "Pennsylvania Athletic Code," regulating kick boxing; further regulating amateur boxing; establishing a State boxing register; providing for medical training seminars; requiring certain emergency medical equipment to be at situs of certain events; further providing for suspension; further defining referee's role in boxing contest; prohibiting tough guy contests or battle of the brawlers contests; and providing a penalty.

=== Actions ===
Referred to STATE GOVERNMENT, April 13, 1983 Reported as amended, May 25, 1983 First consideration, May 25, 1983 First consideration, May 25, 1983 Second consideration, with amendments, June 14, 1983 Third consideration and final passage, June 15, 1983 (47–0) In the House Referred to STATE GOVERNMENT, June 21, 1983 Reported as amended, Sept. 19, 1983 First consideration, Sept. 19, 1983 Laid on the table, Sept. 19, 1983 Removed from table, Sept. 27, 1983 Re-referred to APPROPRIATIONS, Sept. 28, 1983 Re-reported as committed, Oct. 12, 1983 Second consideration, Oct. 17, 1983 Third consideration, with amendments, Oct. 19, 1983 Final passage, Oct. 19, 1983 (196–0) (Remarks see House Journal Page 1606), Oct. 19, 1983 In the Senate Senate concurred in House amendments, Oct. 26, 1983 (50–0) Signed in Senate, Oct. 26, 1983 Signed in House, Oct. 26, 1983 In hands of the Governor, Oct. 27, 1983 Last day for action, Nov. 6, 1983 Approved by the Governor, Nov. 3, 1983 Act No. 62

== Background ==
In 1979, Pittsburgh based CV Productions Inc. (Frank Caliguri & Bill Viola), created the rules for a new sport that mixed various martial arts and combat sports. The combined fighting competitions [36](now known as mixed martial arts) were coined,"Battle of the Tough Guys" or "Tough Guy Contest." The competition format was unprecedented at the time and fell outside the jurisdiction of the Pennsylvania State Athletic Commission (PSAC) who regulated boxing and wrestling. Control of the new sport became a point of contention between CV Productions and the PSAC. CV Productions promoted events across the state of Pennsylvania until the Attorney General enacted a temporary ban the company in January 1981.

During the interim ban of CV Productions, Michigan based boxing promoter Art Doreheld the 1st Annual Central Pennsylvania Toughman Contest in Johnstown, Pennsylvania on March 20, 1981.[29] The Toughman contest was an amateur boxing show that was permitted by the Commonwealth. Toughman contestant, 23-year old, Ronald Miller (169 lbs.) was knocked down several times by an opponent who weighed 250 lbs. Miller subsequently died from head injuries. The incident prompted public outrage of the Toughman contest.

Miller's family organized protests of Art Dore's Toughman boxing contests and Pennsylvania politicians drafted legislation to outlaw Toughman. June 23, 1981 Senate Bill (SB) 742 was introduced by Senator Mark Singel and passed the Pennsylvania Senate 44–4 in July 1981.

== Controversy ==
=== Tough Guy vs Toughman Controversy ===
CV Productions hosted one of their Tough Guy mixed martial arts style event May 3, 1980 at the Cambria County War Memorial billed as, "Battle of the Brawlers." Ronald Miller's death occurred after injuries sustained at Art Dore's Toughman boxing event held at the same venue less than one year later. The promotional names "Tough Guy" and "Toughman" along with the proximity of the independent promotions caused widespread confusion. SB 742 was introduced in direct response to death of Ronald Miller, but Toughman boxing which incited the legislation was absent from the bill and Tough Guy mixed martial arts was prosecuted. CV Productions expressed conspiracy allegations and alleged that the PSAC had misrepresented the facts in a plot to protect the sport of boxing from box office competition.

=== Abortion Controversy ===
In 1981, abortion legislation was proposed in the Pennsylvania House of Representatives as an amendment to pending SB 742 drafted to outlaw "tough-guy competitions." The suggested amendment by Senator Stephen Freind, aimed at limiting abortions, was patterned after a model statute developed by a Chicago-based, nonprofit anti-abortion organization. The amendment sparked a heated political debate.

Pennsylvania Representative David Richardson was quoted in the December 9, 1981 Legislative Journal referencing the bill stating:

"I would hope that each and every individual would recognize the injustices that were done in this bill. Not only is it not germane, it is unconstitutional and the committee process has been violated by invoking this into SB 742, which was a 'Tough Guy' bill and not an abortion bill."

The bill underwent further change in the legislative process but, when passed, was vetoed by the Governor Richard Thornburgh. The abortion legislation was reformulated and passed by the Governor under the "Abortion Control Act" in 1982. Opposition mounted and the case was ultimately heard in front of the United States Supreme Court [Thornburgh v. American College of Obstetricians and Gynecologists], 476 U.S. 747.

== Legal Precedent ==
Commonwealth of Pennsylvania defined what is now known as mixed martial arts:

(c) As used in this section the phrase "tough guy contest" or "battle of the brawlers" means any competition which involves any physical contact bout between two or more individuals, who attempt to knock out their opponent by employing boxing, wrestling, martial arts tactics or any combination thereof and by using techniques including, but not limited to, punches, kicks and choking. Pennsylvania became the first state to outlaw the sport.

== Pennsylvania State Athletic Commission vs Damon Feldman ==
In 2010, a highly publicized court case hinged on the interpretation of the "Tough Guy Law." The Pennsylvania State Athletic Commission (PSAC) sought an injunction against "Celebrity Boxing" promoter Damon Feldman, of Delaware County, Pennsylvania. The criminal complaint stated that Feldman's events featured "'tough guy' techniques that combine boxing with martial arts, wrestling, kicking and choking" which were banned in Pennsylvania. Feldman disputed that his events were only boxing and of entertainment nature. The judge in the case ruled that in order for a bout to be categorized as a "tough guy competition," the participants must employ multiple combat techniques, not just boxing. The ruling upheld the definition of mixed martial arts.

== Tough Guy Law ==
After the veto of SB 742, Senators Mellow, Singel, O'Connell, Fumo, Musto, and Fisher introduced SB 632 without the abortion amendment,"PROHIBITING TOUGH GUY CONTESTS OR BATTLE OF THE BRAWLERS CONTESTS." The new version of the "Tough Guy Bill" was passed and approved by the Governor, Nov. 3, 1983 effectively banning mixed martial arts.

== Reaction ==
CV Productions claimed the PSAC used the publicity of Ronald Miller's death in a boxing match to encourage the Senate to outlaw the wrong sport. The law specifically named CV Productions service marks, "Tough Guy Contest" and "Battle of the Brawlers,"while Toughman was absent. CV Productions asserted that the ruling was unconstitutional and sought legal counsel to sue the Commonwealth of Pennsylvania for violating the 14th Amendment. Financial restrictions ended the potential lawsuit.

== In popular culture ==
- Literature: The Tough Guy Law was an inspiration of the book Godfathers of MMA.
- Film: The Tough Guy Law is a subject of the documentary film Tough Guys (2016).
