= Bill Viola (martial artist) =

Martial artist

William Viola II
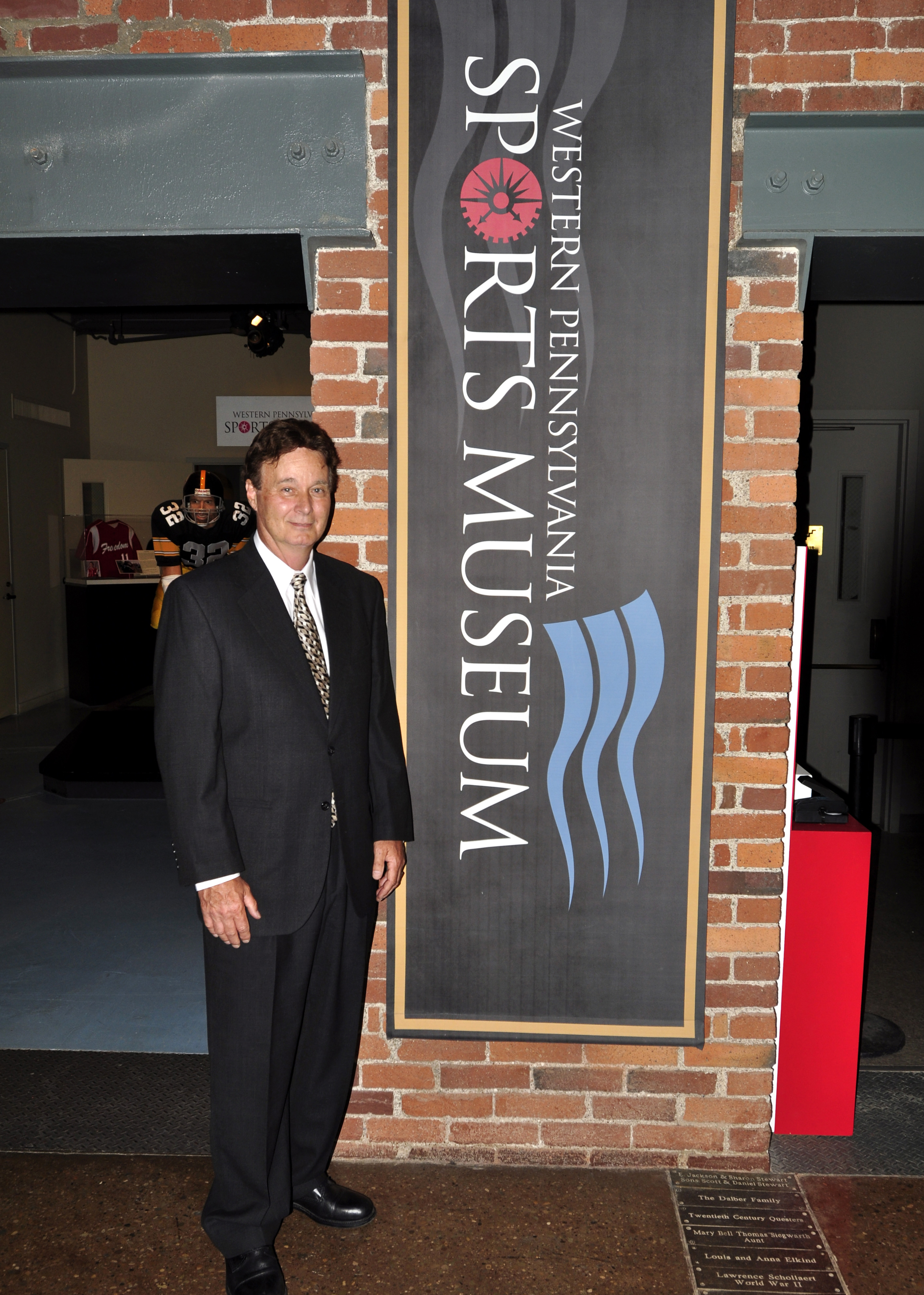
- Born: November 5, 1947 (age 78)
- Occupations: President, CV Productions, Inc. President, Allegheny Shotokan Karate Inc.
- Known for: Pioneering mixed martial arts in the United States, Showtime Film Tough Guys
- Children: Bill Viola Jr

William Viola II (born November 5, 1947) is an entrepreneur, martial arts instructor, and mixed martial arts pioneer credited by some as the co-creator of the sport of MMA. In 1979, he co-founded CV Productions, Inc., the first mixed martial arts company in America and the Tough Guy Contest. His life is the subject of the book Godfathers of MMA and the film Tough Guys.

== Early life ==
Viola was born in Brownsville, Pennsylvania and studied martial arts in the early 1960s while in high school. He continued to study Shotokan karate while attending California University of Pennsylvania, where he graduated in 1969 and was subsequently hired as a science teacher in the East Allegheny School District. Viola established his first karate school, Allegheny Shotokan Karate, in 1969 at East Allegheny. He trained and achieved rank from Robert Trias (United States Karate Association), and George Anderson (USA Karate Federation).

== Mixed martial arts career ==
In 1979 Viola co-founded CV Productions, Inc. with his partner Frank Caliguri. In 1980, the company introduced a new sport, the first regulated mixed martial arts competitions in the United States. Viola helped write the first codified set of mixed martial arts rules for mainstream competition and in 1980 created and promoted organized mixed martial arts competition over a decade before the Ultimate Fighting Championship.

Viola’s MMA promotions were outlawed by the Pennsylvania State Legislature in 1983 with the passage of Senate Bill 632, setting the first legal precedent for MMA in the United States.

== Honors ==
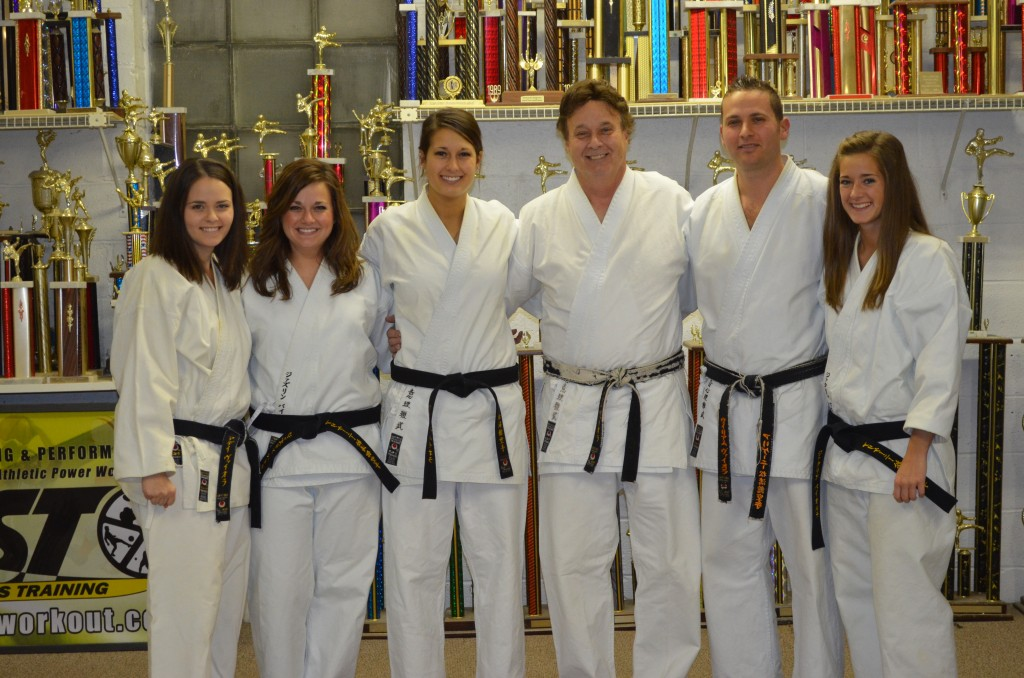
Viola Family

In 2003, the USA Karate Federation inducted Viola into the Hall of Fame, honoring him with a lifetime achievement award and naming him Man of the Year.

CV Productions Inc.’s mixed martial arts league was honored by the Heinz History Center, an affiliate of the Smithsonian Institution. The Western Pennsylvania Sports Museum unveiled an exhibit in 2011 to document Viola's mixed martial arts roots. As a result of Viola and Caliguri's developments, Pittsburgh is considered the birthplace of modern mixed martial arts as a sport in the United States.

He was the star/subject of the Showtime documentary Tough Guys.

The City of Pittsburgh, Pennsylvania named September 23rd 2019 as "Sensei Viola Day" in region to celebrate the 50-year anniversary of Allegheny Shotokan Karate.

Bill Viola Sr. was recognized with the Illustrious Californian Award (2020) by California University of Pennsylvania Alumni Association.

== Personal life ==
Viola has instructed all five of his children to the rank of black belt: Bill Viola Jr., Addie Viola, Jacque Viola, Ali Viola, and Joce Viola. In 1999, his son, Bill Viola, Jr., established the Kumite Classic.
