= Tough Guy Contest =

MMA promoter based in Pittsburgh, Pennsylvania

- Type: Private
- Industry: Mixed martial arts promotion
- Founded: 1979
- Defunct: 1983
- Fate: Outlawed 1983
- Headquarters: Pittsburgh, Pennsylvania, United States
- Owner: Bill Viola, Frank Caliguri

The Tough Guy Contest, founded in 1979 in Pittsburgh, Pennsylvania by CV Productions, Inc., introduced regulated mixed martial arts competition in the United States and established the first MMA league.

The Tough Guy contest was also promoted as "Battle of the Tough Guys" and "Battle of the Brawlers" before rebranding to "Super Fighters."

== Format ==
The Tough Guy Contest was an elimination style mixed martial arts tournament billed as “Anything Goes” and “Organized, Legalized, Streetfighting.” The inaugural field of 64 fighters was broken into light and heavyweight divisions.

Bill Viola wrote the first codified set of mixed martial arts rules in 1979. Fighters were required to use open fingered padded gloves and permitted to use any combination of martial arts skills, including but not limited to boxing, wrestling, grappling, karate, judo, and jiu-jitsu techniques. Bouts were 3 two minute rounds judged using a 10-point-must system. Fighters could win by knockout, technical knockout, submission or decision. Fighters were broken into weight classes, required to wear Olympic style headgear, and subject to a doctor’s approval to fight.

== History ==
The Tough Guy concept was created by Pittsburgh, Pennsylvania martial artists Bill Viola and Frank Caliguri in 1979. They founded CV (Caliguri and Viola) Productions to promote and package mixed martial arts as a legitimate sport. The combination of multiple martial arts disciplines as a sport was unprecedented at the time and the Pennsylvania State Athletic Commission had no jurisdiction over martial arts competitions until 1983.

The first series of Tough Guy competitions were held March 20 to 22, 1980 at the New Kensington, Pennsylvania Holiday Inn ballroom. The finals were held April 18, 1980 at the Stanley Theater. Return fighters in subsequent shows solidified the league. The national finals were scheduled for Las Vegas with a proposed $100,000 prize.

The league regulated over 130 mixed martial arts bouts across Pennsylvania including notable locations in New Kensington, Pittsburgh, Johnstown, Philadelphia, and Greensburg before the Pennsylvania Attorney General's office ordered CV Productions to cease and desist in January 1981.

== Controversy ==
In January 1981, Tough Guy Contests were subject to persecution by the Pennsylvania State Athletic Commission and arbitrarily banned. In the interim, Bay City, Michigan Promoter Art Dore was permitted to host the First Annual Central Pennsylvania Toughman Contest. Toughman was strictly an amateur boxing, a sport that fell under state jurisdiction, regulations, and taxes.

On March 20, 1981, Ronald Miller, 23, was killed as a result of injuries sustained during the Adore Ltd.-sanctioned Toughman boxing competition in Johnstown, Pennsylvania at the Cambria County War Memorial. Weight classes were not implemented and headgear was not permitted. Miller, 169 pounds, was matched with a 250 pound opponent.

The year prior, May 20, 1980, CV Productions promoted the Tough Guy Contest, billed "Battle of the Brawlers" at the same venue. The same location and similar name of competing companies caused confusion among the media and politicians, although the promotions had no association with each other. Tough Guy competitors were required Olympic-style headgear and adhere to mandatory weight classes. No serious or life-threatening injuries were reported.

Miller’s death sparked legislative efforts to ban Toughman (boxing); however The Pennsylvania State Athletic Commission advised the Senate to outlaw Tough Guy (mixed martial arts). Mixed martial arts were suspended before the incident. Boxing, which caused the tragedy, was not prosecuted.

The Pennsylvania State Athletic Commission has been criticized by some for protecting the boxing industry and unjustly banning mixed martial arts in 1983. Mixed martial arts would resurface in 1993 under the banner of the UFC and was re-legalized in Pennsylvania in 2009.

== Tough Guy Law ==
Pennsylvania became the first state in history to outlaw the sport of mixed martial arts in 1983 with the passage of Senate Bill 632, also known as the "Tough Guy Law". The law set the first legal precedence for the sport.

Legislative action began in 1981 with the introduction of Senate Bill 742. The bill specifically targeted CV Productions' mixed martial arts format. The specific language named their service marks and defined mixed martial arts competition as:

AS USED IN THIS SECTION THE PHRASE "TOUGH GUY CONTEST" OR "BATTLE OF THE BRAWLERS" MEANS ANY COMPETITION WHICH INVOLVES ANY PHYSICAL CONTACT BOUT BETWEEN TWO OR MORE INDIVIDUALS, WHO ATTEMPT TO KNOCK OUT THEIR OPPONENT BY EMPLOYING BOXING, WRESTLING, MARTIAL ARTS TACTICS OR ANY COMBINATION THEREOF AND BY USING TECHNIQUES INCLUDING, BUT NOT LIMITED TO, PUNCHES, KICKS AND CHOKING.

In 1981, Representative David Richardson referred to SB 742 as a "Tough Guy Bill", calling it unconstitutional because it contained anti-abortion legislation. The "Tough Guy Bill" passed the Pennsylvania House and the Senate but was vetoed by Governor Dick Thornburgh on December 23, 1981.

The Tough Guy Bill was amended, reintroduced, and signed into law by Thornburgh on November 3, 1983 (Act 1983-62), becoming the "Tough Guy Law".

== Legacy ==
The Heinz History Center, in conjunction with the Smithsonian Institution, unveiled an exhibit on June 23, 2011 documenting the Tough Guy Contest and recognizing Pittsburgh as the birthplace of modern mixed martial arts competition.

The Tough Guy Contest was the inspiration for the book Godfathers of MMA by Bill Viola Jr and Dr. Fred Adams, and the subject of the documentary film Tough Guys.

== See also ==
- Toughman Contest
