= David P. Richardson (Pennsylvania politician) =

American politician

David P. Richardson Jr.

Member of the Pennsylvania House of Representatives from the 201st district
- In office 1973–1995
- Preceded by: Francis Rush
- Succeeded by: John L. Myers

Personal details
- Born: April 23, 1948 Philadelphia, Pennsylvania
- Died: August 18, 1995 (aged 47) Philadelphia, Pennsylvania
- Party: Democratic

David P. Richardson Jr. (April 23, 1948 – August 18, 1995) is a former Democratic member of the Pennsylvania House of Representatives.

== Formative years ==
Born in Philadelphia, Pennsylvania on April 23, 1948, Richardson apprenticed at the Clarence Farmer Printing Service in 1960 before graduating from Germantown High School in 1965.

Employed as an anesthesiologist's aide at Mercy Douglas Hospital from 1965 to 1966, he then worked as an insurance agent for the Provident Home Insurance Company from 1966 to 1968 before becoming a recreation specialist with The Philadelphia Department of Parks and Recreation, a position he held from 1968 to 1969.

He then became an increasingly visible public figure in his capacity as executive director of the Greater Germantown Youth Corporation from 1968 to 1972.

== Political career ==
A member of the Democratic Executive Committee's 12th Ward, 2nd Division from 1977 to 1990, Richardson became leader of the Democratic Committee's 59th Ward in 1991, and remained in that position until 1995. A Democrat, he was elected to the Pennsylvania House of Representatives for its 1973 term, and served a total of twelve consecutive terms. During his tenure, he was appointed to the Pennsylvania Council on the Arts in 1981, and continued to serve in that capacity until 1995. Among those mentored by Richardson during his time in the house was Donna Reed Miller.

In addition, Richardson served as the honorable lieutenant colonel aide-de-camp to Alabama Governor George C. Wallace in 1984.

== Death and interment ==
Richardson suffered a heart attack in 1995, and died in Philadelphia on August 18, 1995, while still a serving member of the Pennsylvania House. He was interred at the Marion Memorial Park in Bala Cynwyd, Pennsylvania.
