= CV Productions, Inc. =

US mixed martial arts promoter

- Type: Private
- Industry: Mixed martial arts
- Founded: 1979
- Headquarters: Pittsburgh, PA, United States
- Key people: Bill Viola (founder & president); Frank Caliguri (founder)
- Subsidiaries: Tough Guy Contest
- Website: cvproductionsinc.com

CV Productions, Inc., is a Pittsburgh, Pennsylvania-based mixed martial arts company, founded in 1979. It is considered the first MMA based company in the United States and responsible for creating the blueprint for modern mixed martial arts competition. The company promoted the first regulated league of mixed martial arts style competitions beginning in 1980 with the intention of creating a new mainstream sport. The league events pitted combatants from all fighting disciplines including boxers, kick boxers, martial artists, wrestlers, grapplers, and all around "tough guys". Competitors could win by opponent's submission, knockout or judges' decision (based on the 10-point "must" system). The competitions were promoted as "Anything Goes - striking, throwing, grappling, punching, kicking, ground fighting, and more". The shows were immediately dubbed by the media as "Organized, Legalized, Street Fighting", a phrase coined by KDKA TV's Dave Durian.

== History ==
CV is an abbreviation for its co-founders' last names, Pittsburgh martial arts pioneers Bill Viola of Irwin, Pennsylvania and Frank Caliguri of Arnold, Pennsylvania. The promoters set out to address the hypothetical question: "Who would win between Muhammad Ali (boxer), Bruce Lee (martial artist) or Bruno Sammartino (wrestler)?" Viola and Caliguri spent much of 1979 developing the foundation for a series of mixed martial arts style competitions. They concentrated on an untapped market by providing a true platform to settle the dispute of which style of fighting was superior. The events were advertised as "Anything Goes", and "legalized striking, throwing, grappling, punching, kicking, ground fighting, submissions and more". Fighters from all disciplines were eager to compete and earn bragging rights. The first Tough Guy championship would take place March 20, 1980, in New Kensington, PA. The company organized a league of events and promoted more than 10 competitions across Pennsylvania under the banner of "Battle of the Brawlers", "Battle of the Tough Guys", "Tough Guy Contests" and finally rebranded "Super Fighters" (Super Fighters League - SFL) throughout 1980. Notable locations included the Stanley Theater, now the Benedum Center in Pittsburgh., Cambria County War Memorial Arena in Johnstown, Pennsylvania, and the Philadelphia Convention Hall and Civic Center.

== Mainstream sport ==
CV Productions, Inc. was the first grass roots movement to develop mixed martial arts into a modern American sport in 1980 (although the term MMA was not used at the time). Popular promotions such as the Ultimate Fighting Championship (UFC) were not held until 1993 and did not reach the Pittsburgh area until 2011. CV Productions, Inc. developed a fight format to appeal to mainstream audiences, and partnered with concert promotion specialists Di cesare-Engler Productions of Pittsburgh. After major successes in the Pennsylvania region, the company laid the ground work to expand.

CV Productions, Inc. promoted mixed martial arts as a mainstream professional sport, understanding that the concept had unlimited potential for growth. Viola and Caliguri devoted meticulous attention to fight details, rules, regulations, and competitor safety in order to gain widespread acceptance. The first codified set of mixed martial arts rules were written by Bill Viola in 1979, an eleven-page rule book that parallels modern mma rules of today. The competitions legalized mixed fighting techniques but also implemented safety precautions that forbid certain attacks such as eye gouging and groin strikes. The fight league was decades ahead of its successors by instituting weight classes, open figured safety equipment, headgear, ring side doctors, back stage physicians, professional referees and fighter contracts. In 1980 CV Productions, Inc. retained Attorney James Irwin to begin negotiating national television rights.

== "Tough man" vs. "Tough guy" controversy ==
In 1979 Viola and Caliguri pitched the idea of "anything goes fighting", looking for the toughest fighters in America to enter The Tough Man competition scheduled for March 1980 Unknown to them, Michigan businessman Art Dore was attempting a boxing tournament called "Toughman Contest". CV Productions, Inc. immediately changed their initial promotion to the "Tough Guy" contest to distinguish themselves. Tough Guy events were MMA-style fights that utilized open-fingered gloves and permitted ground fighting, and all styles of martial arts. Toughman contests were purely boxing and used 16-ounce gloves. The companies had no affiliation with each other.

== Banning mixed martial arts ==
On November 6, 1980, CV Productions, Inc. was ordered by The Pennsylvania State Athletic Commission to cancel their upcoming show in Greensburg, PA. CV was given an ultimatum; if they proceeded, the Pennsylvania State Police would intervene and shut the event down. CV Productions, Inc. ignored the warning citing that the Athletic Commission had no proven jurisdiction or legal right to stop combined fighting competitions. Under the Pennsylvania Athletic Code Act of August 31, 1955 (P.L.531, No.131), the state oversaw boxing and professional wrestling, but mixed martial arts was a new sport. On November 6 and 7, 1980 the Greensburg show went on, only to open the door for further scrutiny by the government. In a bizarre turn of events, Ronald Miller, 23 died after entering a Dore-sponsored Toughman boxing competition in Johnstown, PA.

This tragedy had no association whatsoever with CV Productions, Inc. As a result, the Pennsylvania Legislature launched an investigation of all fighting events in the state and ultimately outlawed mixed martial arts. Pressure from the State Athletic Commission prompted a congressional hearing ultimately leading to the passage of SENATE BILL No. 632 Session of 1983 aka The Tough Guy Law, effectively banning all MMA-style events in Pennsylvania, specifically naming CV Production's Battle of the Brawlers and Tough Guy contests.

The groundbreaking law defines modern mixed martial arts with its language prohibiting: "ANY COMPETITION WHICH INVOLVES ANY PHYSICAL CONTACT BOUT BETWEEN TWO OR MORE INDIVIDUALS, WHO ATTEMPT TO KNOCK OUT THEIR OPPONENT BY EMPLOYING BOXING, WRESTLING, MARTIAL ARTS TACTICS OR ANY COMBINATION THEREOF AND BY USING TECHNIQUES INCLUDING, BUT NOT LIMITED TO, PUNCHES, KICKS AND CHOKING." Pennsylvania set the first legal precedent for mixed martial arts in United States history

After careful legal consideration Viola and Caliguri were advised to stop promoting events in 1981. Effective February 27, 2009, Pennsylvania legalized mixed martial arts. This marked the end of a thirty-year struggle between mixed martial arts and the Pennsylvania State Athletic Commission.

== CV Productions referees ==
Jacquet Bazmore, Former World Heavyweight Kickboxing Champion and nephew of boxing great Archie Moore, trained at Viola and Caliguri's martial arts schools. Noted as one of the most prolific kickboxers of his era, he also was a sparring partner for boxing legend Muhammad Ali.

Jack Bodell, former martial arts student of Bill Viola at Allegheny Shotokan Karate, was at the time of the competition an agent of the United States Secret Service charged with protecting President Jimmy Carter.

== Pittsburgh MMA Hall of Fame ==
Induction of original Tough Guy Contestants into the MMA Hall of Fame, May 30, 2010

Pittsburgh MMA instituted the MMA Hall of Fame in 2010 and inducted fighters from the original Tough Guy Competition held March 20, 1980. The ceremony took place at the Kumite Classic Martial Arts Expo held in Monroeville, Pennsylvania on May 30, 2010. In conjunction with the ceremony, CV Productions, Inc. promoted "Caged Kumite", a pro-am mixed martial arts show. The event commemorated the thirty-year anniversary of mixed martial arts in Pittsburgh. Bill Viola collaborated with his son, Bill Viola III, himself an internationally ranked martial artist, on the event.

== Heinz History Museum ==
CV Productions founders Bill Viola (left) and Frank Caliguri (right) at Mixed Martial Arts Exhibit in the Pennsylvania Sports Museum of the Heinz History Center, Pittsburgh, PA, installed June 23, 2011

The Western Pennsylvania Sports Museum of the Heinz History Center of Pittsburgh, Pennsylvania in conjunction with the Smithsonian Institution unveiled an exhibit on June 23, 2011, to document the first mixed martial arts league in the United States. The exhibit features memorabilia from the mixed martial arts based competitions including rare posters, fight gear, press materials, and photos that depict the event. The exhibit began as a display in the front of the museum, and will ultimately find its home as a permanent addition to the boxing and wrestling sections of the Sports Museum. The Senator John Heinz History Center is an affiliate of the Smithsonian Institution and the largest history museum in Pennsylvania.

"The Sports Museum has brought to light the central role that Pittsburgh has played in the sports of boxing and wrestling, focusing on such greats as Bruno Sammartino and Kurt Angle," said Anne Madarasz, co-director of the Western Pennsylvania Sports Museum. "This exhibit adds a new chapter as we trace the roots of mixed martial arts in the United States back to the Pittsburgh region."

== The Godfathers of MMA ==
Shortly after the success of the UFC, Viola and Caliguri attended a Golden Gloves boxing show at Monzo's Palace Inn, Monroeville, Pennsylvania. Famed Pittsburgh boxing promoter Jimmy Cvetic affectionately recognized them in the audience and introduced them as the Godfathers of MMA. The nickname has stuck and is commonly used to acknowledged them as the original creators of the sport of mixed martial arts in America.

== Pittsburgh MMA Inc. ==
In August 2012 CV Productions, Inc. amended its corporate structure to be renamed "Pittsburgh MMA Inc." officially recognizing Western Pennsylvania as the birthplace of the sport of MMA in America. Bill Viola currently serves as President.

== Pop culture ==
CV Productions was the subject of the books Godfathers of MMA (2014) and Tough Guys (2017) written by Bill Viola Jr. Viola and Caliguri also starred in the Showtime documentary film Tough Guys (2017) which chronicled the first mixed martial arts league in America.
