= Toughman Contest =

Fighting contest founded in 1979

The Toughman Contest, founded in 1979 in Bay City, Michigan, by late boxing promoter Art Dore (1936–2022), is a chance for the novice amateur boxers (those with no more than five sanctioned wins in the past five years) to test themselves in the ring.

== Format ==
Toughman Contest formats vary from state to state and are configured to each particular state’s rules and regulations. The most common format prescribes the use of standard amateur boxing rules, 16 ounces for each glove, protective headgear, and bouts made of 3 rounds of boxing. Each round is 2 minutes with a 60-second rest period or interval for men and 1 minute rounds with 1 minute or 45-second intervals for women.

The Original Toughman Contest plays across the US in between 75 and 100 cities each year and culminates with the World Championship. Toughman Contest tournaments feature the local residents of a particular city (generally, participants must live within 100–150 mile radius of where the event is to be held). Contestants must be at least 18 years of age, pass a standard boxing physical, and meet any other requirements of the state's boxing commission's regulations, and also sign a waiver freeing the parent company from liability. Some states, like Florida and Missouri, do not sanction the Toughman Contest and other amateur boxing contests unless it is under the rules and regulations of the USAAB.

== History ==
The Toughman Contest was started in 1979 by Art Dore and Dean Oswald in Bay City, Michigan. Dore and Oswald wanted to prove how tough they were and opened it up to their friends determine who was the toughest. The Toughman Contest spread quickly. In its heyday, Toughman Contests were held at Las Vegas Casinos and broadcast live on multiple networks. Fox and FX aired weekly Toughman Contest shows from 2000 to 2004 featuring Matt Vasgersian and Lawrence Taylor as commentators. At its peak, 135 Toughman shows were conducted around the US in 2001.

After 2001 Toughman was revived in West Virginia by Jerry Thomas.

Toughman Contest is the most widely attended boxing series in the United States in the last three decades. Dozens of Toughman contests continue be held as annual events in West Virginia, Ohio, and Oklahoma.

== In culture ==
The 1983 film Tough Enough, starring Dennis Quaid, features a Toughman Contest. Dore served as a technical advisor and inspired the character played by Warren Oates.

In 1995, Toughman licensed a video game for the Sega Genesis called Toughman Contest.

== Deaths and controversy ==
In 2003, Toughman faced public scrutiny following the death of Stacy Young in a "Toughwoman" bout staged as part of a Toughman competition in Sarasota, Florida. Young was a last-minute entry and faced Sara Kobie in the ring. Kobie's hits on Young led to Young's death from brain injuries. Young's family sued the Toughman company. The following year, Florida enacted the Stacy Young Act into law, requiring such competitions be sanctioned by the Florida State Boxing Commission. A 2007 review of boxing deaths documented six fatalities in "Original Toughman" competitions since 1979, and another ten in "Toughman-style" bouts.

== Notable competitors ==
- Eric "Butterbean" Esch
- Matt Mitrione
