= Hammerstone Studios =

American film production company

- Industry: Film industry
- Founder: Alex Lebovici
- Headquarters: Los Angeles, California, U.S.
- Website: www.hammerstonestudios.com

Hammerstone Studios is an American independent film financing and production company founded in 2018 by Canadian film producer Alex Lebovici. The company develops and produces independent films across multiple genres.

== Overview ==
Hammerstone Studios was founded in 2018 by Alex Lebovici following his work on films including Roman J. Israel, Esq. and The Red Sea Diving Resort. The company launched with the drama The Public, directed by Emilio Estevez, which premiered as a gala presentation at the Toronto International Film Festival.

The company later produced films including Bill & Ted Face the Music, the third installment of the Bill & Ted franchise starring Keanu Reeves and Alex Winter, and the horror film Barbarian, directed by Zach Cregger, which grossed approximately $45 million worldwide against a production budget of $4.5 million.

Hammerstone typically develops projects without an attached domestic distributor and finances them through a combination of foreign pre-sales, tax incentives, and private investment.

In December 2022, it was announced Hammerstone Studios partnered with Kojima Productions to develop a film adaptation of the video game Death Stranding. The project was set to be produced by Lebovici and Hideo Kojima, with Hammerstone financing the film.

In March 2026, Hammerstone Studios appointed Karina Manashil as senior vice president of creative and brand development. In this role, Manashil was tasked with expanding the company's activities into areas such as publishing, merchandising, gaming and live events in addition to film production. Her production company, Kaijo, was folded into Hammerstone as part of the appointment.

== Filmography ==
Year	Title	Notes
2018	Uncharted: Live Action Fan Film	
2018	The Public	distributed by Greenwich Entertainment
2020	Bill & Ted Face the Music	distributed by Orion Pictures
2020	Come Away	distributed by Relativity Media
2021	Zeros and Ones	distributed by Lionsgate
2022	Barbarian	distributed by 20th Century Studios
2023	Boy Kills World	distributed by Lionsgate and Roadside Attractions
2023	Sympathy for the Devil	distributed by RLJE Films
2024	Don't Move	distributed by Netflix
2025	Flight Risk	distributed by Lionsgate
2026	Black Box	distributed by Aura Entertainment
2026	By Any Means	distributed by Paramount Pictures
2026	A Statement	distributed by Sony Pictures Classics
2026	At the Sea	
2026	Iconoclast	
TBA	Slime	
