= Francisco Lufinha =

Portuguese kitesurfer

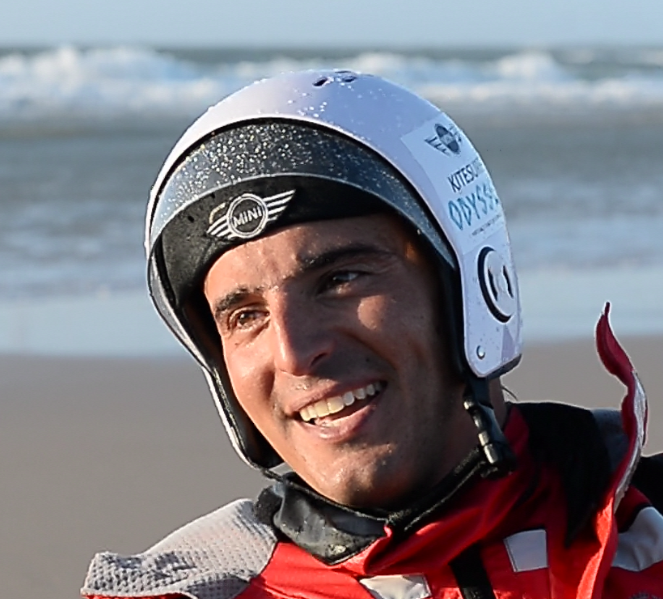
- Francisco Lufinha in Peniche after a 3 hour kitesurf ride around Berlengas

Personal information
- Born: 9 August 1983 (age 42) Lisbon, Portugal
- Years active: 1993–present
- Website: www.lufinha.pt

Surfing career
- Sport: Surfing
- Sponsors: MINI, EDP
- Major achievements: World record for longest non-stop kitesurfing journey, among other achievements.

Francisco Lufinha (born 9 August 1983, in Lisbon, Portugal), achieved several world records, namely the Fastest Atlantic Kiteboat Crossing (solo) in 2021 and the Longest Journey Kitesurfing (without stops) in 2015. He is a completely passioned by nautical sportsman. Taken aboard a boat by his parents only 15 days after he was born, he was never able nor wanted to let go of the sea again.

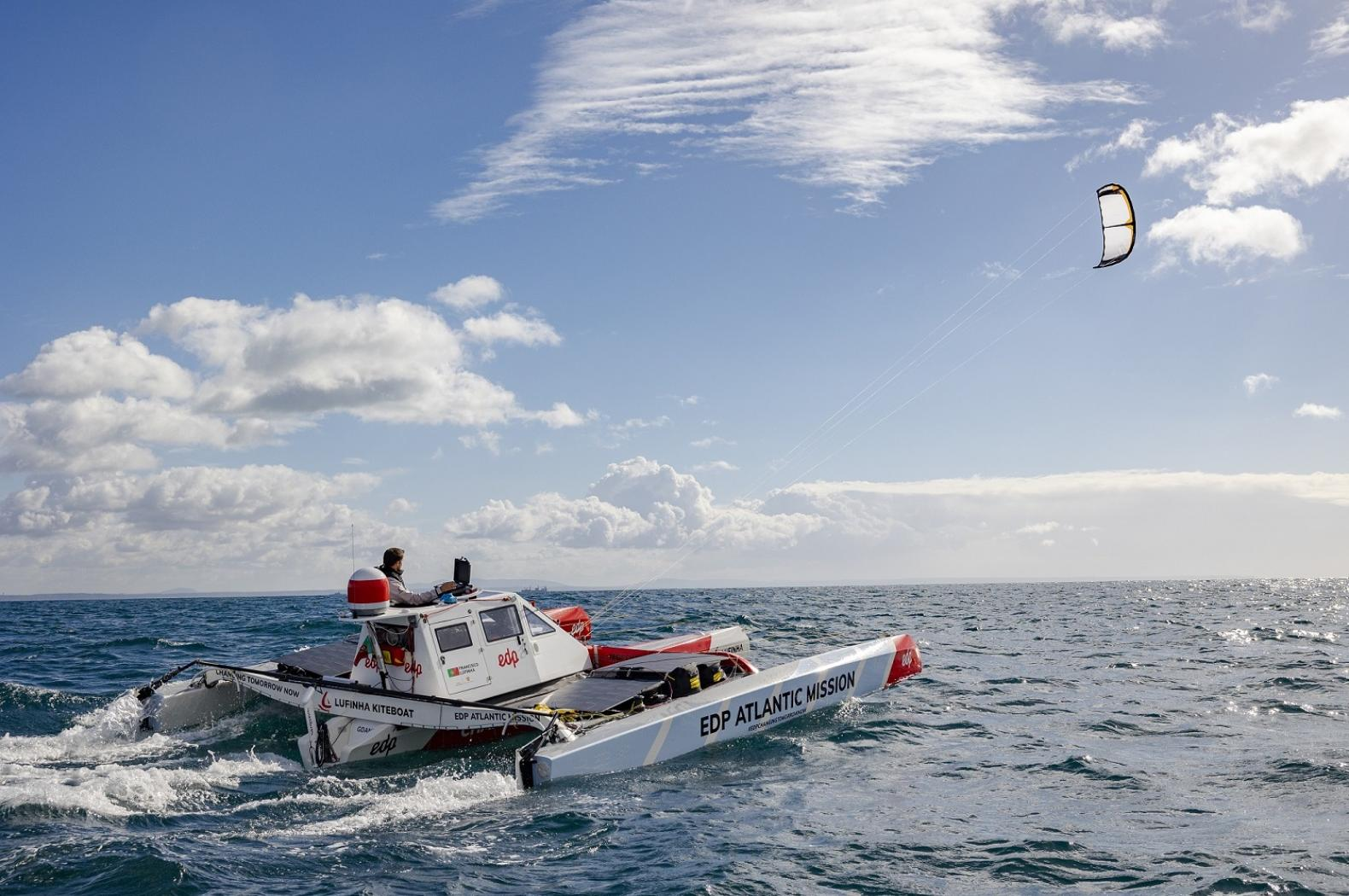
Francisco Lufinha starting the EDP Atlantic Mission at Cascais, Portugal heading to the Caribbean on his kiteboat.

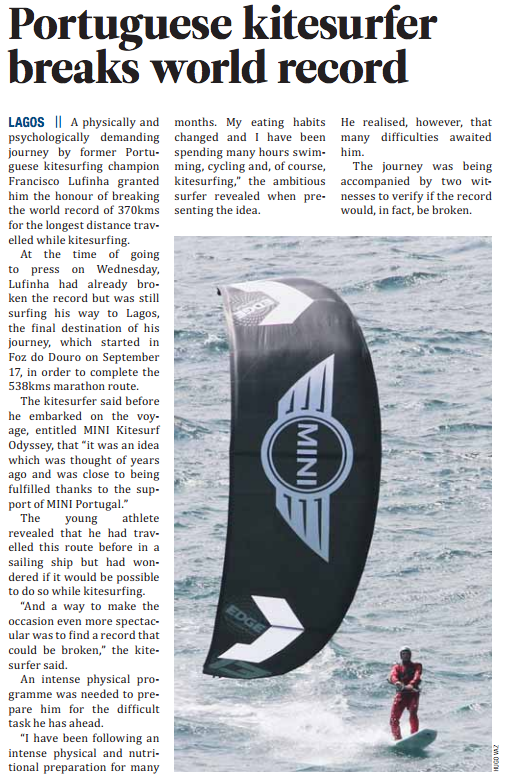
Piece of news

At age eleven, he started to compete in the Optimist dinghy class, where he won several regional and national races and ended representing his country at the ’98 Europeans in Split, Croatia. At age 15 he upgraded to the 420 (dinghy) (boats of two persons) where he raced until he was eighteen and won the national overall ranking.

While developing his sailing skills, he was always looking for the most recent extreme sport to try to learn how to do it. Water skiing and wakeboarding were his first choices, then windsurfing and the latest, in 2002, was kitesurfing.

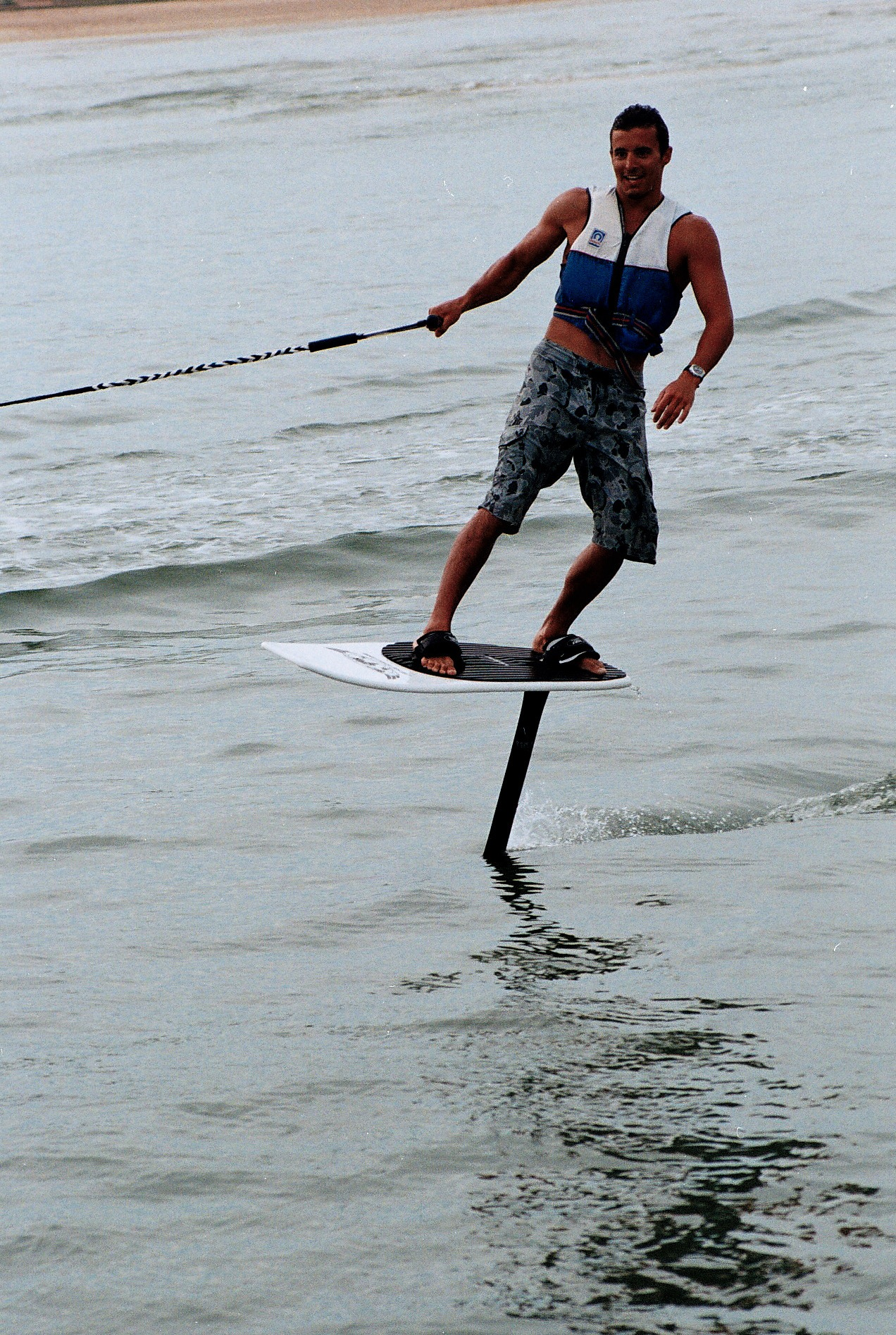
Hydrofoil wakeboarding

Francisco was fond of kitesurfing the most because it is a mix of his favorite sports. In 2005 he was national champion and in 2006 vice-champion.

== Studies and career ==
In parallel with his sportive life, Francisco graduated from a master's degree in engineering and industrial management at Instituto Superior Técnico in 2007, which lead to jobs as auditing at Deloitte, strategy marketing analyst at BES bank, co-manager of the Portuguese offshore sailor Francisco Lobato’s project, CTO at ConsultaClick.com (co-founder), general manager at Dakhla Attitude resort in Morocco, private yacht skipper and manager and in 2014 was co-founder of +Mar (Portuguese association for promoting the nautical tourism and sports) in which he is president, nautical events organizer and speaker at conferences and company private events.

== Extreme challenges ==
=== Transat 650 ===
From 2009 to 2011, Francisco was co-manager of the solo sailor Francisco Lobato's campaign, in which they have won the extreme Transat 6.50 race from France to Brazil in 2009 and several other races in the Figaro solo sailing class.

=== Kitesurf Odyssey, 4 extreme challenges between 2013 and 2017 ===
The challenge involved kitesurfing non-stop along the Portuguese coast from Porto to Lagos, a distance of over 500 km. Francisco Lufinha (assuming the surname based on the context of this famous feat) had conceptualized the expedition after several years of sailing the route. In 2013, he determined the crossing was feasible without stops provided there was a consistent wind forecast. The preparation for the event included physical and mental training to manage the endurance requirements of the distance.

He made it till the end and kitesurfed 564 km in 28 hours and 53 minutes, always on the board, setting a new world record for longest distance kiteboarding without stops.

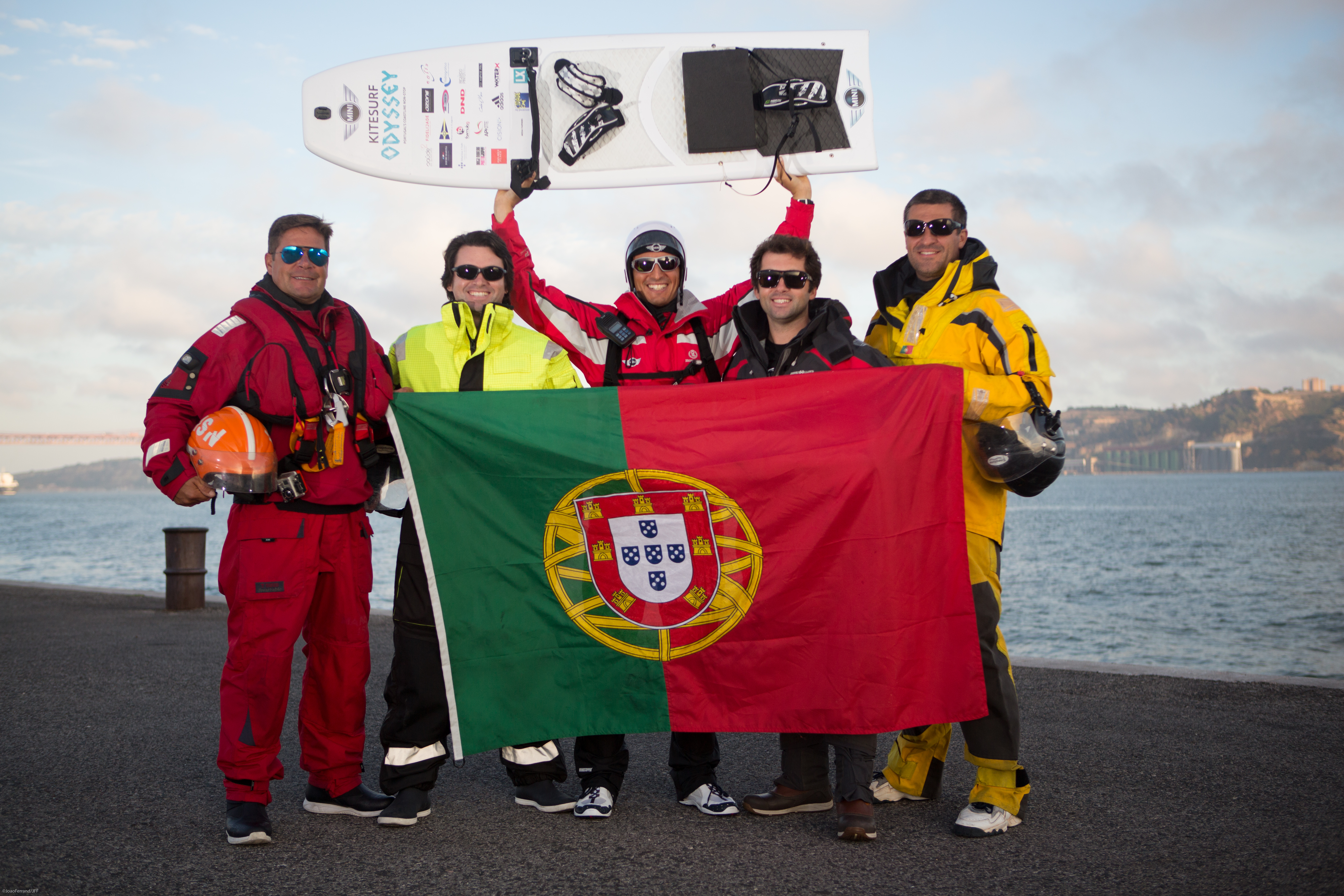
Francisco Lufinha's Team on the MINI Kitesurf Odyssey

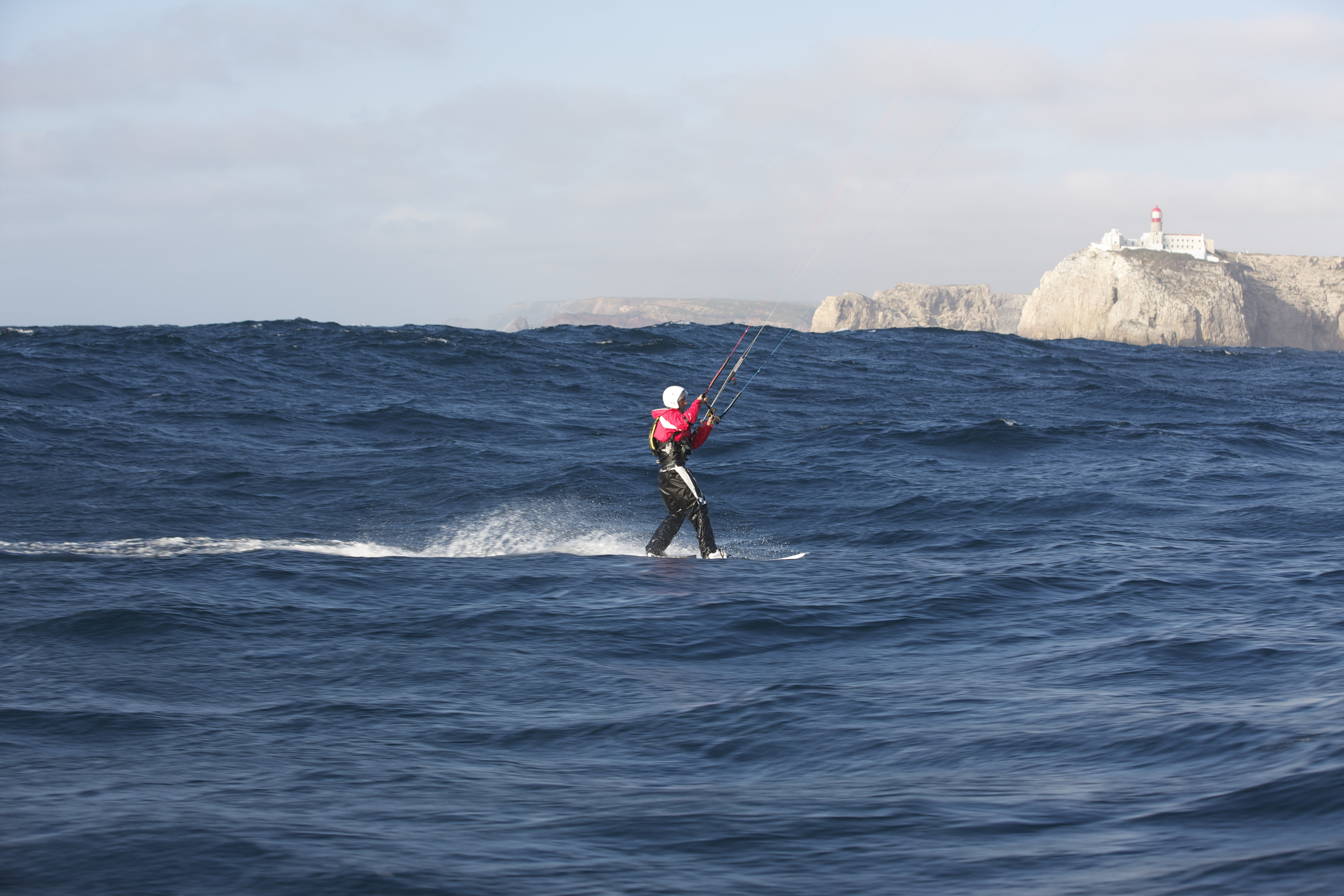
Francisco passing by the St. Vincent Cape

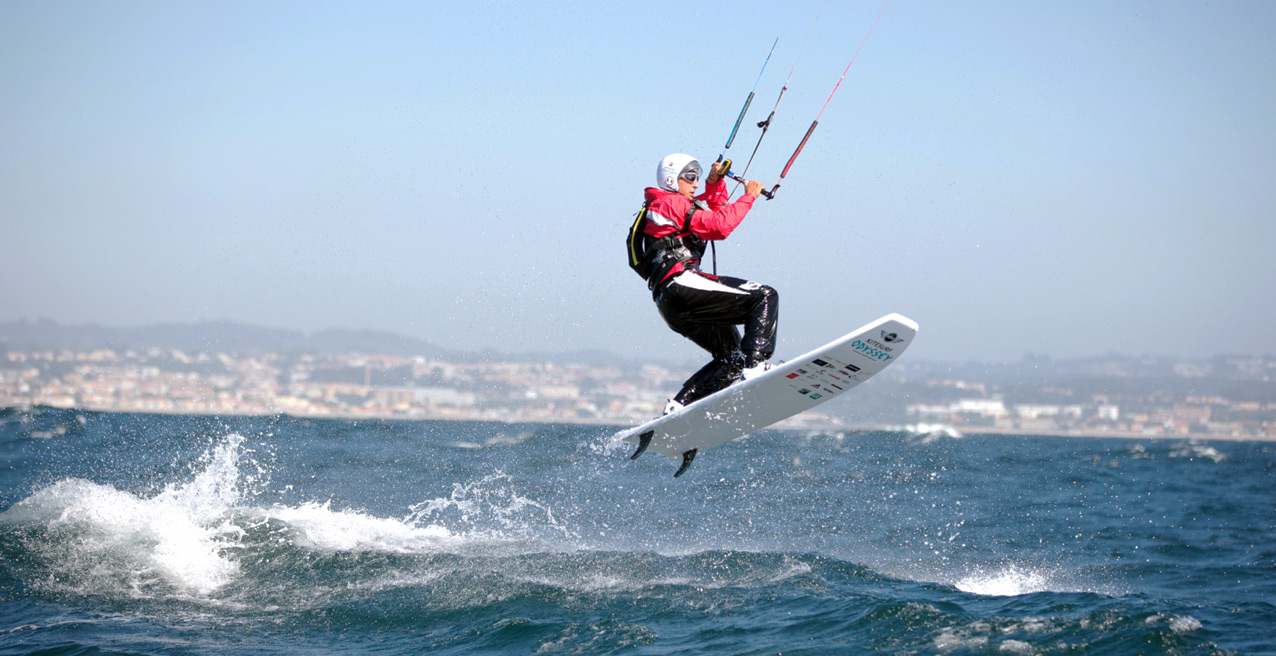
Francisco jumping at the beginning of the MINI Kitesurf Odyssey

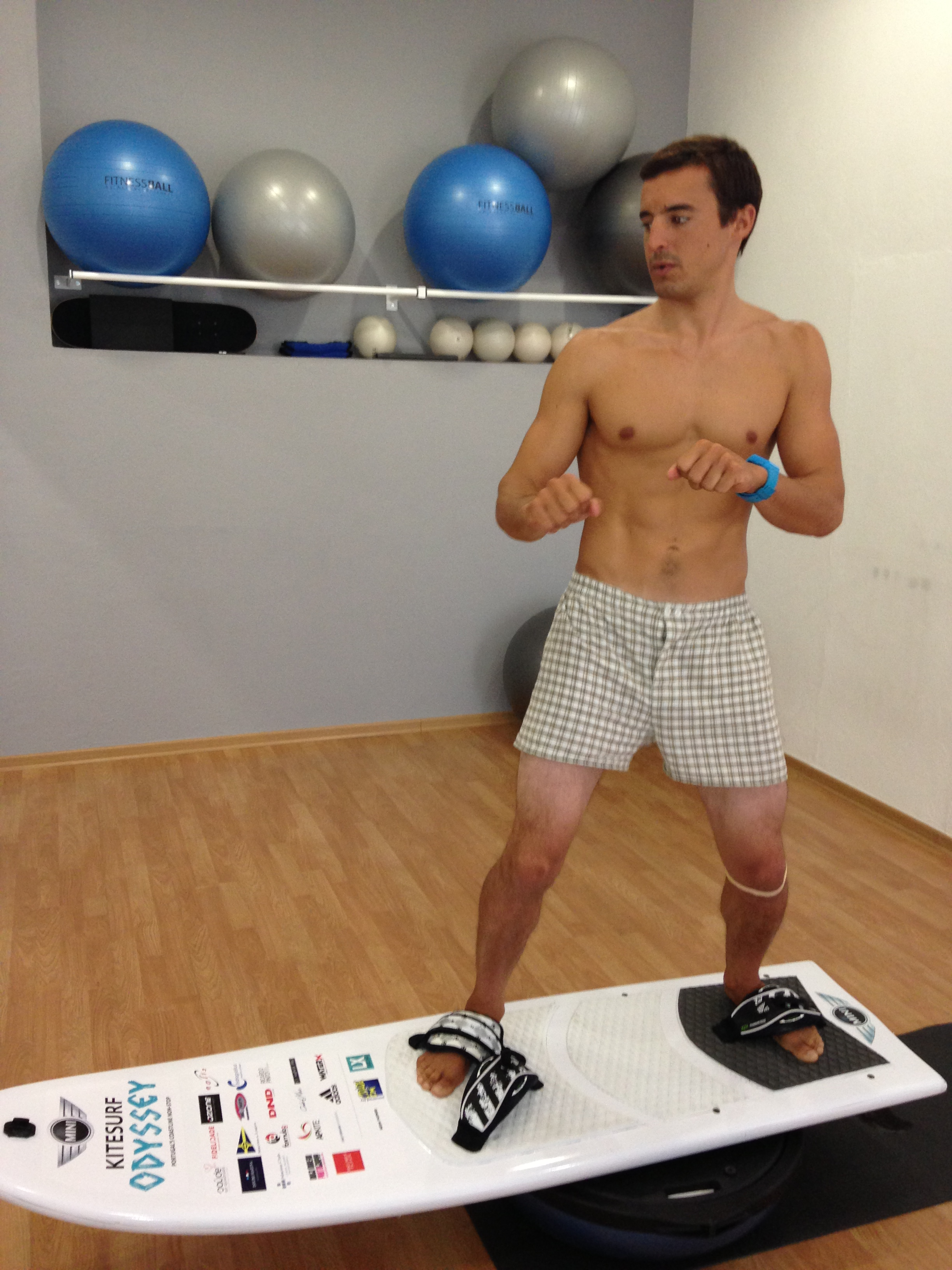
Physical Training

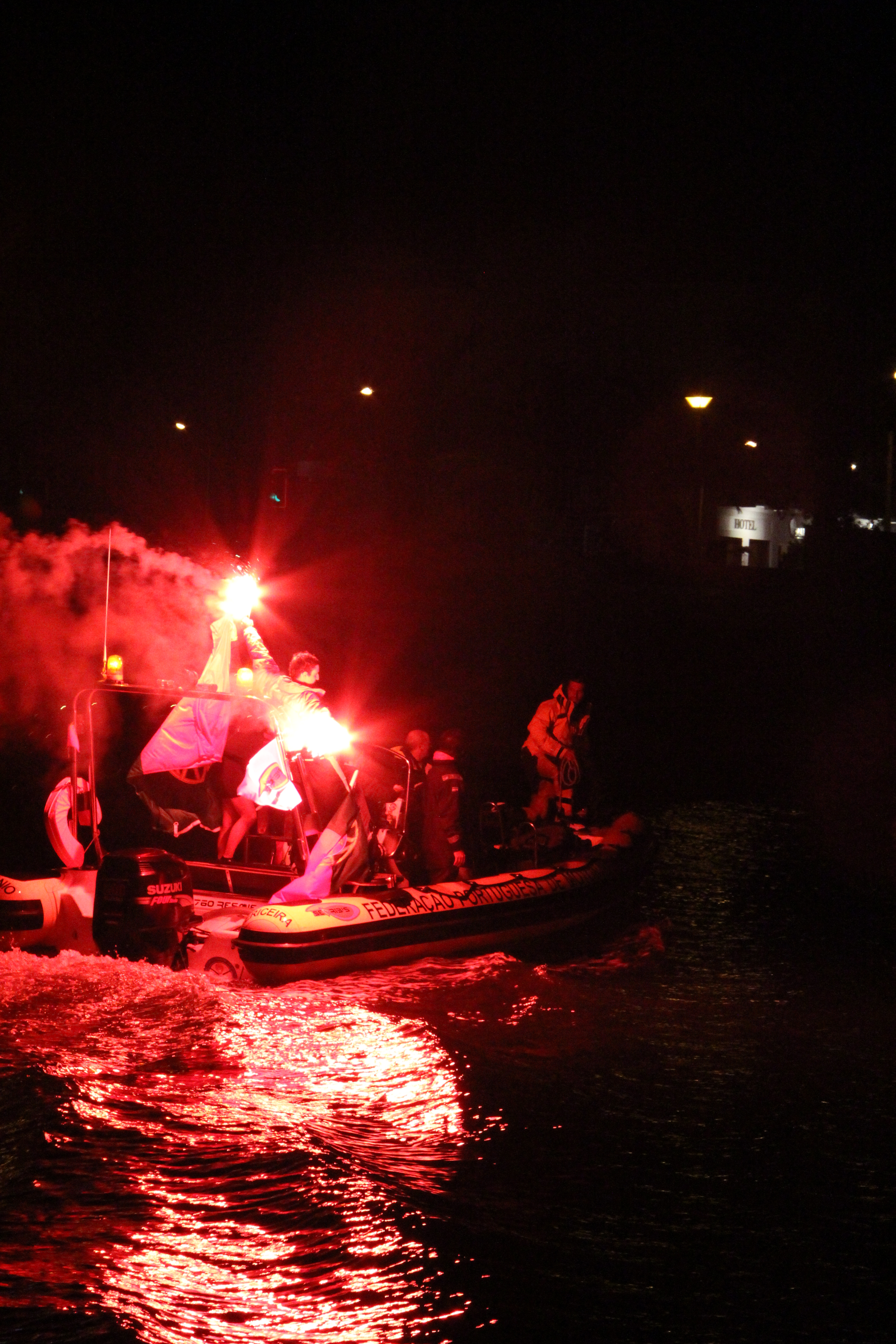
MINI Kitesurf Odyssey arrival at Lagos

=== EDP Atlantic Mission - Kiteboat world record ===
In November 2021, Lufinha started his boldest challenge aboard a kiteboat developed by himself, to cross the Atlantic Ocean from Lisbon to Martinica, solo, without any support boat. He reused a fast sailing trimaran with 7,25m by 5,6m wide, removed the sailing rig, built a cabin to live in and adapted kite control technology to be able to go as fast as possible to the other side. He had to stop in La Palma / Canary islands to repair Kites and wait for good wind conditions. He set sail from La Palma on 30 November 2021 and arrived to Martinica / Caribbean on 20 December 2021, setting a new world record of 20 days for the fastest atlantic kiteboat crossing solo.

== Results ==
=== Sailing ===
==== Optimist Class ====
1994

Sailing Schools Regional Champion (solo + team)
Sailing Schools National Champion (solo)

1995

Nr 1 National Ranking class B

1996

13th national championship, Cascais
4th "Trofeu Martin Barrero" – Vigo, Spain

1998

7th overall national Championship
36th European Camp. – Split, Croatia
(Achieved High Level Competition athlete status)

==== 420 Class ====
1999

3rd Júnior national Championship – Azores Islands

2000

7th Júnior overall national Championship
24th Júnior European Championship - Germany

2001

1st overall national Championship/Ranking
2nd Old Spice Regatta
11th European Championship – Geneva, Switzerland)

==== Mistral Class ====
2000

3rd Portuguese júnior Championship – Azores Islands
5th Vilamoura Sailing Week - Portugal

=== Kitesurfing ===
2002

Started kitesurfing

2003

11th Overall Ranking National Kiteboard Tour

2004

13th KPWT event at Matosinhos/Portugal
1st Corona European Champion at Caparica/Portugal
3rd Corona European Champion at Alacati/Turkey

2005

Portuguese National Kiteboard Tour Champion

2006

Portuguese National Kiteboard Tour Vice-Champion
7th KPWT event at Paros/Greece

2007

6th at PKRA Racing, in Portugal

== Events ==
=== III Feira Náutica do Tejo ===
Head of the organization of the 3rd edition of the "Feira Náutica do Tejo", the biggest nautical show in Portugal in 2014. Head of the organization of "WaterKings", the ultimate watersports challenge in Lagos/Portugal, mixing kitesurf+windsurf+SUP+sailing in the same course.

== Movies ==
Francisco directed the first Portuguese kitesurf movie "KitePróTuga", in 2006.
Francisco directed the documentary "Ocean Adventures", about the Transat 650 sailing race and Francisco Lobato's journey in 2009.
Francisco directed the 3 documentaries of the several "Kitesurf Odyssey" challenges around the Portuguese Sea.
