= Iconoclast (2026 film) =

2026 American psychological thriller film

- Directed by: Gabriel Basso
- Written by: Gabriel Basso
- Produced by: Gabriel Basso; Alex Lebovici; Noah Centineo; Enzo Marc; Paul Bernard
- Starring: Gabriel Basso; Courtney Eaton; Noah Centineo; Rain Spencer
- Cinematography: Lula Carvalho
- Edited by: Blu Murray
- Music by: Mick Gordon
- Production companies: Hammerstone Studios; Script 2 Screen; Arkhum Productions; McGuffin Entertainment
- Release date: June 9, 2026 (Tribeca Festival)
- Running time: 120 minutes
- Country: United States
- Language: English

Iconoclast is a 2026 American psychological thriller film written and directed by Gabriel Basso. It stars Basso, Noah Centineo, Rain Spencer, and Courtney Eaton.

== Premise ==
Follows a reclusive young man whose dangerous obsession with a live-streaming influencer increasingly erodes his grip on reality.

== Cast ==
- Gabriel Basso as Connor
- Courtney Eaton as Nika, a live-streaming influencer
- Noah Centineo
- Rain Spencer as Morgan, Connor's colleague
- Kiernan Shipka

== Production ==
On November 12, 2025, Deadline Hollywood reported that the Iconoclast film was in development with Gabriel Basso making his directorial debut, and starring Basso, Noah Centineo, Rain Spencer, Courtney Eaton and Dasha Nekrasova. Two days later, on November 14, 2025, it was announced that Nekrasova was fired from the film after a podcast interview with far-right political commentator Nick Fuentes.

Principal photography took place in Utah.

== Release ==
The film had its worldwide premiere at Tribeca Festival on June 9, 2026.
