= Isaiah Mustafa =

American actor and football player (born 1974)

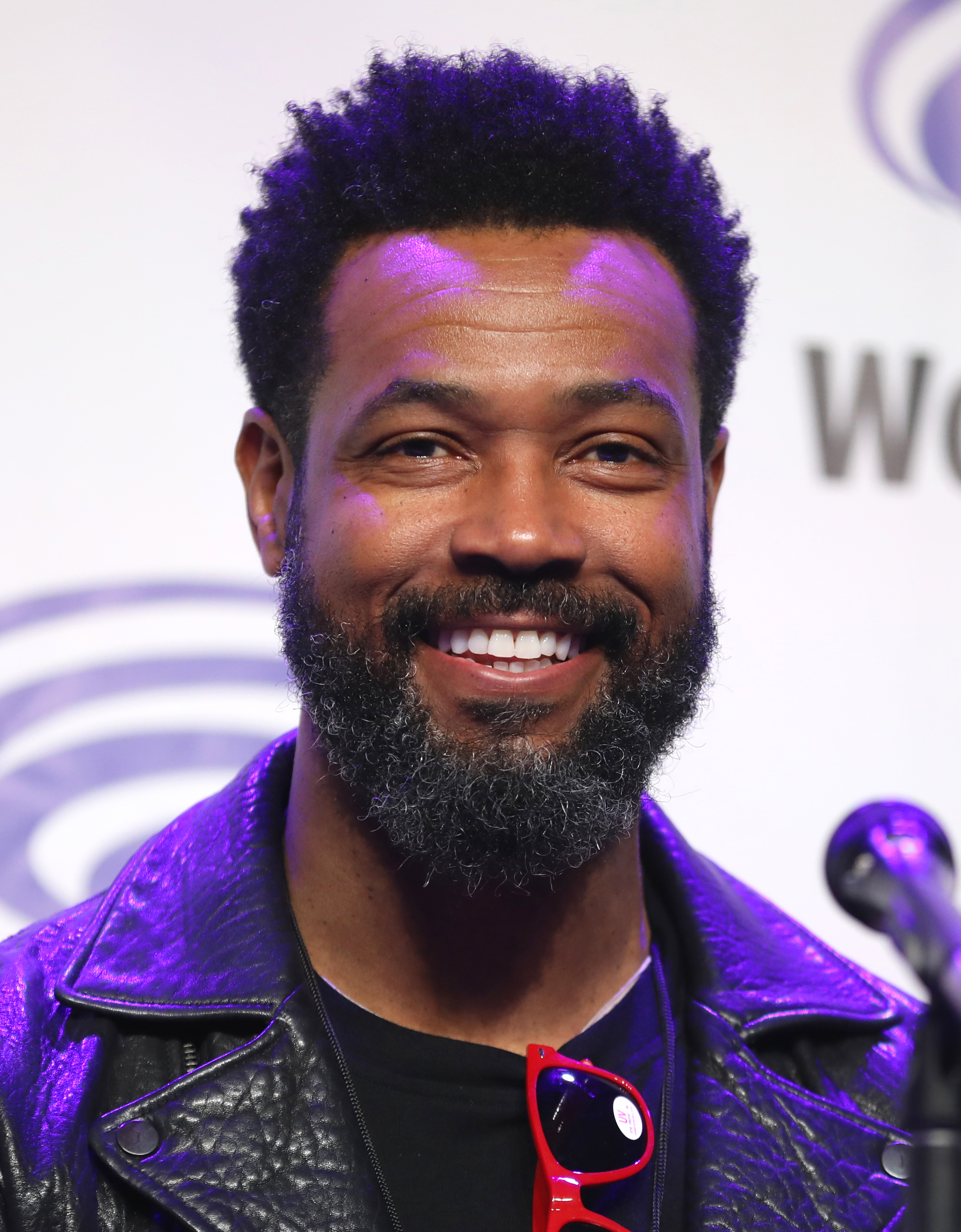
- Mustafa at the 2024 WonderCon
- Born: February 11, 1974 (age 52); Portland, Oregon, U.S.
- Education: Arizona State University
- Occupations: Actor; football player
- Years active: 1997–present
- Spouse: Lisa Mitchell (m. 2018)
- Children: 2
- Football career

No. 18
- Position: Wide receiver

Personal information
- Listed height: 6 ft 4 in (1.93 m)

Career information
- High school: Oxnard (CA) Santa Clara
- College: Arizona State
- NFL draft: 1997: undrafted

Career history
- Tennessee Oilers (1997)*; Barcelona Dragons (1998); Tennessee Oilers (1998)*; Oakland Raiders (1999)*; Cleveland Browns (1999)*; Seattle Seahawks (2000)*
- * Offseason or practice squad member only

Isaiah Amir Mustafa (born February 11, 1974) is an American actor and former American football wide receiver. Mustafa is widely known as the main character in a series of Old Spice television commercials, "The Man Your Man Could Smell Like". He is also known for portraying Luke Garroway on Freeform's fantasy series Shadowhunters, adult Mike Hanlon in It Chapter Two, and Detective John Sampson in the Prime Video crime thriller Cross.

== Childhood ==
Mustafa was born in Portland, Oregon to Shahidah Mustafa-Davis and John Wali Mustafa, the youngest of seven children in a Muslim family. When Mustafa was 5 years old, the family relocated from Portland to Mission Viejo, California, and his father opened a limousine service in Laguna Hills. Several years after the family relocated to California, Mustafa's father was killed in a car accident.

He was educated at Santa Clara High School, and later attended Santa Monica College, before transferring to Moorpark College. Mustafa then studied history at Arizona State University, from which he graduated in 1995.

== Career ==
=== Football ===
Mustafa played basketball and ran track at Santa Clara High School in Oxnard, California. He did not play high school football, but he tried out for Moorpark College's football team hoping for an athletic scholarship; he became a free safety, and later became a wide receiver.

After transferring to Arizona State University in 1995, Mustafa was a starting wide receiver for the Arizona State Sun Devils but had an unspecified "confrontation" with a coach and was benched his senior year. He played during the 1997 Rose Bowl between the then-undefeated Sun Devils (led by Mustafa's friend Jake Plummer) and the Ohio State Buckeyes.

Although Mustafa expected to become a high school teacher after graduation, a sports agent suggested that he try out for NFL teams. The Tennessee Oilers signed him to the practice squad, then sent him to NFL Europe's Barcelona Dragons in 1998. After a season on the Oakland Raiders and Cleveland Browns' practice squads in 1999, Mustafa attended the Seattle Seahawks' training camp in 2000.

=== Acting ===
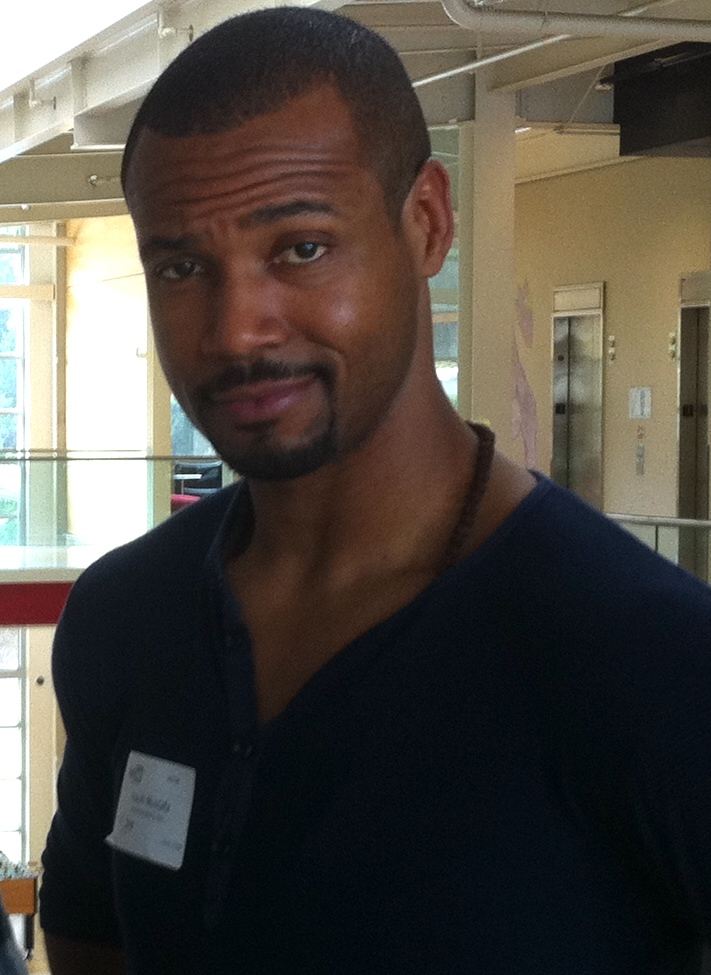
Mustafa in August 2010

After the Seahawks, Mustafa pursued an acting career, playing small roles on various television series, including Ugly Betty and Days of Our Lives.

In 2010, he signed a talent deal with NBC and appeared as a supporting role in the comedy film Horrible Bosses. Mustafa hosted the TBS special Funniest Commercials of the Year in both 2010 and 2011. In 2011, Mustafa guest-starred in two episodes of ABC's action drama series Charlie's Angels, portraying Detective Ray Goodson, an ex-boyfriend of one of the Angels. The following year, he guest-starred in two episodes of The CW's spy drama series Nikita, playing the role of Cyrus, a former agent for Division and a member of the "Dirty Thirty".

In April 2013, Mustafa appeared in a commercial for the Israeli beer Maccabee. The following year, he starred in the pilot episode of the USA Network comedy series Sirens as a police officer named Danny. In May 2015, it was announced that Mustafa would portray the werewolf Luke Garroway on the Freeform fantasy series Shadowhunters, based on The Mortal Instruments series of novels by Cassandra Clare.

In 2019, Mustafa played the adult Mike Hanlon (Chosen Jacobs in his younger version) in It Chapter Two, the sequel to the 2017 horror film It.

In 2022, Mustafa played an educated Civil War veteran traveling through the mining town of Yellowstone City, Montana who is unjustly accused of murder after a local miner who just struck gold is found dead, in Murder at Yellowstone City.

==== Old Spice ====
In February 2010, he gained sudden fame for his main role in the popular "The Man Your Man Could Smell Like" advertising campaign for Old Spice, which featured his monologues. Mustafa's first commercial in the series was directed by Tom Kuntz. Subsequently, a three-day session created a series of humorous, personalized YouTube videos, with Mustafa reprising the character from the original Old Spice commercial. These were directed at members of the public and celebrities who had asked him questions on websites such as Reddit, Facebook and Twitter.

On July 26, 2011, Old Spice launched a new campaign on YouTube featuring a challenge between Mustafa and Fabio entitled Mano a Mano in el Baño. Mustafa said he wasn't worried, even though Fabio has been "the epitome of the sex symbol as a pitchman". Mustafa ultimately emerged as the winner. He resumed his work for Old Spice with a series of advertisements released in January 2014. The campaign featured several webpages selling false products directed at men, which were interrupted with Mustafa suggesting that men buy Old Spice instead. In August 2015, Mustafa once again appeared in Old Spice commercials, this time alongside Terry Crews.

== Personal life ==
Mustafa has one daughter with his former wife. He previously dated professional wrestler and actress Catherine Joy Perry, better known by her ring name Lana. He married his girlfriend of two years, Lisa Mitchell, on May 26, 2018; they have one son together.

He owned a restaurant, Jo Jo's Barbecue, on Melrose Avenue in Los Angeles in 2000; it has since closed.

Mustafa is a comic book fan; his knowledge of Doctor Doom's first name helped him win $47,000 on The Weakest Link, for a question on the first name of Doctor Frankenstein. The money helped him pursue his post-restaurateur goal of becoming an actor. Mustafa had expressed interest in playing comic book superhero Luke Cage, and appeared as Cage in a Marvel Comics web short, styled after his Old Spice commercials.

== Filmography ==
=== Film ===
Year	Title	Role	Notes
2005	The Island	Injured Football Player	
2006	The Last Supper	Moses	Short film
2006	Even Money	Basketball Player	
2011	Madea's Big Happy Family	Calvin	
2011	Horrible Bosses	Officer Wilkens	
2012	The Three Stooges	Moe's Hip Executive	
2013	Crush	Coach Evans	
2014	Back in the Day	T	
2016	Girl Flu.	Gabriel	
2016	After the Reality	Garreth	
2019	It Chapter Two	Mike Hanlon	Shared role with Chosen Jacobs
2022	Home Team	Porcupine Coach	
2022	Murder at Yellowstone City	Cicero	
2023	Boy Kills World	Benny	
2025	I Know What You Did Last Summer	Andrew	Uncredited

=== Television ===
Year	Title	Role	Notes
2007	Football Wives	Football Player	Television film
2008	Ugly Betty	Bailiff	Episode: "Odor in the Court"
2009	Days of Our Lives	Cleveland Cop	2 episodes
2009	NCIS: Los Angeles	Brent Duffy	Episode: "Search and Destroy"
2009	Eli Stone	Newlywed Husband	Episode: "Tailspin"
2009	NCIS	Oliver Newcomb	Episode: "Caged"
2010	Castle	Team Leader	Episode: "Boom!"
2010–2011	Chuck	Richard "Rick" Noble	2 episodes
2011	Hot in Cleveland	Coach Kevin	Episode: "LeBron is Le Gone"
2011	Love Bites	Captain Craig	Episode: "Sky High"
2011	Femme Fatales	Raven	Episode: "Speed Date"
2011	Charlie's Angels	Detective Ray Goodson	2 episodes
2012	Rags	Reginald Worth	Television film
2012	Nikita	Cyrus	2 episodes
2014	Anger Management	Paul	Episode: "Charlie Screws a Prisoner's Girlfriend"
2014	Sirens	Danny	Episode: "Pilot"
2014	Selfie	Mitchell McMoney	Episode: "Nugget of Wisdom"
2014	Kroll Show	Hammer	Episode: "Mother Daughter Sister Wife"
2015	Baby Daddy	Captain Hudson	Episode: "An Officer and a Gentle Ben"
2016–2019	Shadowhunters	Lucian "Luke" Garroway	Main role
2017	Total Divas	Himself	Episode: "What Happens in Vegas..."
2018–2021	Robot Chicken	Various voices	2 episodes
2021	Grey's Anatomy	Brian Williams	Episode: "Today Was a Fairytale"
2022	Black-ish	Himself	Episode: "And the Winner Is..."
2024–present	Cross	John Sampson	Main role

=== Video games ===
Year	Title	Role
2011	Gears of War 3	COG Gear (voice)
