= Murder at Yellowstone City =

2022 American film by Richard Gray

- Theatrical release poster
- Directed by: Richard Gray
- Written by: Eric Belgau
- Produced by: Richard Gray; Rob Menzies; Lisa Wolofsky; Kelly Frazier; Anjul Nigam; Julie Stagner; Colin Floom; Brian David Cange
- Starring: Gabriel Byrne; Thomas Jane; Isaiah Mustafa; Anna Camp; Nat Wolff; Richard Dreyfuss
- Cinematography: John Garrett
- Edited by: Joe Mitacek
- Music by: Mel Elias; Armando Ortega
- Production companies: Yellowstone Film Ranch; Renegade Entertainment
- Distributed by: RLJ Entertainment
- Release date: June 24, 2022
- Running time: 127 minutes
- Country: United States
- Language: English

Murder at Yellowstone City (formerly titled Murder at Emigrant Gulch) is a 2022 American Western film directed by Richard Gray from a screenplay by Eric Belgau.

== Premise ==
In a gold-rush boomtown that has gone bust, a prospector strikes gold and is murdered. Sheriff Jim Ambrose (Gabriel Byrne) assumes that the killer is a newcomer, a former slave who calls himself Cicero (Isaiah Mustafa), because "he's the only man who doesn't know what [Ambrose will] do to him." But as it becomes clear that Cicero is innocent and as the mystery of the prospector's death deepens and puts the whole town in jeopardy, the town's new minister, Thaddeus Murphy (Thomas Jane), and his straight-shooting wife, Alice (Anna Camp), must stand up to Sheriff Ambrose and bring the true culprit to justice.

== Cast ==
- Isaiah Mustafa as Cicero
- Gabriel Byrne as Sheriff Jim Ambrose
- Thomas Jane as Thaddeus Murphy
- Richard Dreyfuss as Edgar Blake
- Nat Wolff as Jimmy Ambrose Jr.
- Anna Camp as Alice Murphy
- Aimee Garcia as Isabel Santos
- Zach McGowan as Robert Dunnigan
- Scottie Thompson as Emma Dunnigan
- Emma Kenney as Rebecca Davies
- Tanaya Beatty as Violet Running Horse
- John Ales as Mickey O'Hare
- Lew Temple as David Harding
- Lia Marie Johnson as Eugenia Martin
- Isabella Ruby as Josephine Wright
- Danny Bohnen as Marcus O'Sullivan

== Production ==
Principal photography began in May 2021 in Montana. At the Cannes Film Market in June 2021, additional casting was revealed, and it was announced that production had wrapped.

== Release ==
In April 2022, it was announced that RLJE Films acquired North American distribution rights to the film, which would be released in theaters and on VOD on June 24, 2022.

== Reception ==
The film has a 25% rating on Rotten Tomatoes based on 20 reviews.
