= Alex Lebovici =

Canadian film producer

- Education: New York Film Academy
- Occupation: Film producer

Alex Lebovici is a Canadian film producer and founder of the production and financing company Hammerstone Studios. He is known for producing genre and independent films including Barbarian and Boy Kills World.

== Early life and education ==
Lebovici began making short films at the age of 13. He later moved from Canada to the United States to study directing at the New York Film Academy in Los Angeles, where he completed twelve short films during his studies. He graduated in 2006 and subsequently interned at Original Film. Alex is a Zionist.

== Career ==
Before pursuing film production full-time, Lebovici ran a window-cleaning business in Toronto. Over several years, the business expanded to employ around 150 seasonal workers. After selling his share of the business, Lebovici moved back to Los Angeles to pursue film production. One of his early producing credits was the comedy The Clapper, starring Ed Helms and Amanda Seyfried, which premiered at the Tribeca Film Festival.

In 2018, Lebovici founded the film financing and production company Hammerstone Studios. The company was launched following his work on films including Roman J. Israel, Esq. and The Red Sea Diving Resort.

In the same year, it was reported that Bill & Ted Face the Music, the third installment in the Bill & Ted franchise, was moving forward with Lebovici and Hammerstone Studios as one of the producers. The film was released through a simultaneous video-on-demand and limited theatrical rollout during the COVID-19 pandemic.

In December 2022, it was announced that Lebovici and Hammerstone Studios partnered with Kojima Productions to produce a film adaptation of the video game Death Stranding, with Allan Ungar attached as an executive producer. In the same month, Lebovici was announced as a producer of the horror thriller Don't Move, produced by Hammerstone Studios in collaboration with Raimi Productions and Capstone Studios. The film was directed by Adam Schindler and Brian Netto and produced alongside Sam Raimi and Zainab Azizi. Don't Move later debuted at number one on Netflix's Global Top 10 Movies chart for the week of October 21–27, 2024.

Lebovici previously executive produced the horror film Barbarian, which grossed more than $45 million worldwide. He also produced Boy Kills World, an action thriller directed by Moritz Mohr and starring Bill Skarsgård and Famke Janssen.

In 2024, Lebovici was reported to be producing several projects including At the Sea, directed by Kornél Mundruczó and starring Amy Adams; the thriller Flight Risk, directed by Mel Gibson and starring Mark Wahlberg; and the animated creature feature Slime, starring Kid Cudi, Willow Smith, Teyana Taylor, Anna Sawai, John Cho and John Boyega. Other projects mentioned at the time included Kung Fury, directed by David Sandberg and starring Sandberg, Arnold Schwarzenegger and Michael Fassbender. The film, based on the 2015 short Kung Fury, has faced delays due to a legal dispute with a financier.

In 2025, Lebovici was also reported to be producing Elegance Bratton's crime thriller By Any Means starring Mark Wahlberg and Yahya Abdul-Mateen II. In November of the same year, he was also reported as a producer and financier of the psychological thriller Iconoclast, the directorial debut of Gabriel Basso.

In February 2026, Lebovici was announced as an executive producer on an untitled drama directed by Tom McCarthy, based on Nathaniel Rich's book Losing Earth. The film, co-financed by Sony Pictures Classics, features an ensemble cast including Paul Rudd, Evan Peters, Amy Ryan, Paul Giamatti, John Turturro, Tatiana Maslany, and Jason Clarke. Lebovici executive produced the project through Hammerstone Studios alongside a group of producers that included Matt Damon and Ben Affleck's Artists Equity, Anonymous Content, Jigsaw Productions, Concordia, and Andrew Lauren Productions.

In April 2026, it was announced that Lebovici would executive produce Little One, a dark comedy directed by Alex Kavutskiy in his feature directorial debut. The project is financed and produced by Hammerstone Studios and is produced alongside Zach Cregger, Roy Lee, Chris McEwen, Amanda Phillips, and Melina Torres. Production was scheduled to begin in Los Angeles in June 2026.

== Filmography ==
Year	Title	Role	Notes
2008	Broken Tulips	Associate producer	Short film
2014	Tapped Out	Producer	
2015	Fugitives	Co-executive producer	
2016	Daylight's End	Co-producer	
2017	West of Time	Executive producer	Short film
2017	Roman J. Israel, Esq.	Executive producer	
2017	Mom and Dad	Co-executive producer	
2017	Who We Are Now	Executive producer	
2017	The Clapper	Producer	
2017	Altitude	Executive producer	
2018	Uncharted: Live Action Fan Film	Executive producer	Short film
2018	The Public	Producer	
2019	The Red Sea Diving Resort	Executive producer	
2020	Bill & Ted Face the Music	Producer	
2020	Come Away	Executive producer	
2021	Zeros and Ones	Executive producer	
2022	Padre Pio	Executive producer	
2022	Barbarian	Executive producer	
2023	Boy Kills World	Producer	
2023	Sympathy for the Devil	Producer	
2024	Don't Move	Producer	
2025	Flight Risk	Executive producer	
2026	At the Sea	Producer	
2026	By Any Means	Producer	
TBD	Kung Fury 2	Producer	
TBD	Slime	Producer	
TBD	Iconoclast	Producer	
