= By Any Means (2026 film) =

Film by Elegance Bratton

- Theatrical release poster
- Directed by: Elegance Bratton
- Written by: Sascha Penn
- Produced by: Alex Lebovici; Chester Algernal Gordon; Elegance Bratton; Basil Iwanyk; Erica Lee; Mark Wahlberg; Stephen Levinson
- Starring: Yahya Abdul-Mateen II; Mark Wahlberg; Nicole Beharie; Josh Lucas; David Strathairn; Giancarlo Esposito
- Cinematography: Ante Cheng
- Edited by: Kristan Sprague
- Music by: Terence Blanchard
- Production companies: Hammerstone Studios; Thunder Road Films; Municipal Pictures; Freedom Principle Productions
- Distributed by: Paramount Pictures (United States)
- Release dates: September 1, 2026 (Los Angeles); September 4, 2026 (United States)
- Running time: 107 minutes
- Country: United States
- Language: English
- Budget: $29 million
- Box office: $17 million

By Any Means is a 2026 American historical crime thriller film directed by Elegance Bratton and written by Sascha Penn. The film stars Yahya Abdul-Mateen II, Mark Wahlberg, Nicole Beharie, Josh Lucas, David Strathairn, and Giancarlo Esposito. A young Black FBI agent teams up with notorious New York City mafia hitman, Greg Scarpa, to investigate the murders of civil rights leaders in Mississippi in 1966.

By Any Means premiered on September 1, 2026, at the Paramount Pictures Studios in Los Angeles, and theatrically released in the United States by Paramount Pictures on September 4, 2026. The film received mixed reviews from critics.

== Plot ==
In 1964, three Mississippi civil rights activists disappear without a trace during the summer. Federal bureau supervisor Roy K. Moore demands swift answers from regional agents. Moore sends ruthless Brooklyn mob enforcer Greg Scarpa south to assist. Scarpa uses physical coercion upon a local Ku Klux Klansman inside a warehouse. The mobster strikes the suspect repeatedly until he talks openly, giving coordinates where victims lie buried under thick red soil.

In Hattiesburg in 1966, civil activist Vernon Dahmer helps local Black citizens register to vote safely. Klansmen ride past his home at midnight and throw burning gasoline cans while opening fire. Dahmer helps his family escape safely through a rear window, but he dies from burns and smoke inhalation the next morning. As his grieving wife Hattie mourns beside neighbor Rebecca Brewer outdoors, a young Black FBI agent, Wayne Strider, arrives to investigate.

Strider moves south with his supportive wife Allison. Moore and Agent Everett Rhodes assign Strider to direct efforts. The local residents refuse federal interviews due to fear of local deputies. Moore assigns Scarpa to partner with Strider.

Strider believes strict legal bounds bring true justice through proper courtrooms, while Scarpa mocks rules and uses coercion to obtain total compliance. Scarpa recites quotes from Malcolm X to justify ruthless choices. Together, they traverse small rural towns searching for active Klan operatives. Scarpa grabs suspects off streets and drags them into blinding spots, where he threatens them at gunpoint to extract names.

Strider watches in dismay as Scarpa breaks federal laws without hesitation, but terrified witnesses begin leaking critical names about the night bombing. The evidence points directly toward Sam Bowers and his local gang. Scarpa corners Bowers alone and forces a confession using physical force. The federal agents raid hidden hideouts across county lines near midnight, while the sheriff deputies facing evidence can no longer protect the Klan killers.

Bowers and multiple Klan members are arrested for Dahmer's death. Strider achieves justice but feels greatly unsettled by federal hypocrisy, pondering his future career path. He realizes systemic prejudice runs through federal law enforcement agencies. Scarpa collects his cash payout from federal agents before leaving town and returning to New York. The Mississippi community honors Vernon Dahmer, with Hattie vowing to continue registration efforts for local voters daily. Strider accepts that law enforcement demands tough compromises every day, and justice arrives only when people push beyond ordinary legal bounds.

== Cast ==
- Mark Wahlberg as Gregory Scarpa, mafia hitman turned FBI informant
- Yahya Abdul-Mateen II as Special FBI Agent Wayne Strider, loosely based on real life FBI agent Lindley DeVecchio
- Nicole Beharie as Allison Strider
- Giancarlo Esposito as Vernon Dahmer
- Josh Lucas as Special Agent Everett Rhodes
- David Strathairn as Special Agent Roy K. Moore
- Ethan Embry as Sam Bowers
- LisaGay Hamilton as Ms. Rebecca Brewer
- LaChanze as Hattie Dahmer

== Production ==
The film is directed by Elegance Bratton and produced by Hammerstone Studios, Thunder Road Films, Freedom Principle, and North.Five.Six. It is based on the 2018 Black List script CI-34, from Sascha Penn and Theodore Witcher. Alex Lebovici is producing for Hammerstone Studios, alongside Basil Iwanyk and Erica Lee for Thunder Road Films, Chester Algernal Gordon for Freedom Principle, Stephen Levinson, and Mark Wahlberg for the Closest to the Hole Production banner. Wahlberg also co-leads the cast, initially alongside Sterling K. Brown. In February 2025, Yahya Abdul-Mateen II joined the cast, replacing Brown, due to scheduling conflicts.

Principal photography began on April 15, 2025, in Atlanta, Georgia, with Ante Cheng serving as the cinematographer. In April, Nicole Beharie, Giancarlo Esposito, Josh Lucas, David Strathairn, Ethan Embry, LisaGay Hamilton, and LaChanze joined the cast. In May, Bright White Light boarded the film. Filming wrapped on June 17, 2025.

Sascha Penn received sole writing credit for the film, with additional literary material (not on-screen) credited to Arash Amel, Elegance Bratton, Andrew Ferguson, and Theodore Witcher.

== Release ==
In April 2026, Paramount Pictures acquired the U.S. distribution rights. By Any Means premiered on September 1, 2026, at the Paramount Pictures Studios in Los Angeles, and theatrically released in the United States by Paramount Pictures on September 4, 2026. Paramount+ will begin streaming the film on December 3.

== Reception ==
=== Critical response ===
On the review aggregator website Rotten Tomatoes, 49% of 78 critics' reviews are positive, with an average rating of 5.5/10. The website's consensus reads: "By Any Means turns a compelling true story of racial injustice into an uneasy mix of exploitation thrills and prestige drama, with Yahya Abdul-Mateen II's nuanced performance too often overwhelmed by Mark Wahlberg's hammy antics." Metacritic, which uses a weighted average, assigned the film a score of 50 out of 100, based on 20 critics, indicating "mixed or average" reviews. Audiences surveyed by CinemaScore gave the film an average grade of "B+" on an A+ to F scale.

== Soundtrack ==
By Any Means: The Album was released by Anzie Blue Records on September 25, 2026.

In addition to the title track written by Diane Warren, the album comprises reimagined versions of hit 1960s songs. Pynk Beard served as the musical director. Much of the album was recorded at FAME Studios in Muscle Shoals, Alabama. Net proceeds of the album benefit Black Music Action Coalition. Apple Music filmed an episode of Color Me Country Radio With Rissi Palmer featuring By Any Means: The Album artists Pynk Beard, Steve Ray Ladson, and Denitia, where they discuss the making of the album "and the deep connections between Southern Black culture, Soul, and Country music, and the importance of reclaiming this history and celebrating the artists and traditions that continue to shape American music."

A music video for the title track — featuring The Isley Brothers, David Kushner, and a cameo by Diane Warren — was released September 4, 2026. The "By Any Means" title track music video, directed by Fran Strine, won Best Music Video — presented by Jimmy Jam — at the 17th Hollywood Music in Media Awards. The HMMA ceremony opened with The Isley Brothers and David Kushner performing "By Any Means" with the backing of soundtrack artists Pynk Beard, Elsie, Steve Ray Ladson, and Diane Warren; which segued into "Shout," the Isleys' premiere single, to underscore their 67 years of releasing original music and progress of the Civil rights movement since their 1959 debut. A music video for "We Shall Overcome" premiered on the album release day. People (magazine) premiered a music video for "Bring It On Home to Me" by Keb' Mo' and Pynk Beard, set in an Ole Smoky Distillery, on November 5.

A tour supporting By Any Means: The Album will commence in The Isley Brothers' home city of St. Louis on November 6. Album artists Pynk Beard, Steve Ray Ladson, Elsie, and Stella Prince will perform on every tour stop, with special guests like Tone Stith, Tatiana Marie Clark, 2'Live Bre, and The BoykinZ appearing in select markets. Rissi Palmer of Apple Music's Color Me Country Radio selected a local opening act for each show. The tour follows Pynk Beard, Steve Ray Ladson, and The BoykinZ performing on the State Fair of Texas Main Stage on the day after By Any Means: The Album's release.

On the Sunday before the 2026 United States elections, By Any Means: The Album artists Pynk Beard, Elsie, 2'Live Bre, and Reyna Roberts performed at a voter activation rally at Vernon Dahmer Park — named after the slain voting rights activist in the By Any Means film — in Dahmer's hometown of Hattiesburg, Mississippi. On the day that the 2026 United States Senate election in Mississippi was called for Scott Colom — becoming the first Black person to hold statewide office in Mississippi since the Reconstruction era — arts and culture correspondent Ian Saint spoke to CBS affiliate WWL-TV in New Orleans (where By Any Means star Yahya Abdul-Mateen II and score composer Terence Blanchard hail from) about the symbolic significance of the By Any Means soundtrack tour playing across the Deep South during the election season, and the Academy Awards implications for Diane Warren's "By Any Means" theme song.

By Any Means: The Album
No.	Performers	Title	Popularized by	Length
1	The Isley Brothers & David Kushner	By Any Means (Film Version)	Original song by Diane Warren	3:56
2	Pynk Beard	We Shall Overcome	Gospel song	2:37
3	Kashus Culpepper	What a Diff'rence a Day Makes	Dinah Washington	2:26
4	Brandy & Pynk Beard	Hit the Road Jack	Ray Charles	2:20
5	Tone Stith	Papa's Got a Brand New Bag	James Brown	2:31
6	Saekyi & nanawho	These Arms of Mine	Otis Redding	3:00
7	Ariel J.	Please Mr. Postman	The Marvelettes	2:18
8	Parson James & ASHBY	Talking About My Baby	The Impressions	2:33
9	Elsie	I Love Your Lovin' Ways	Nina Simone	2:28
10	Stella Prince & Alex Devin	Mrs. Robinson (interlude)	Simon & Garfunkel	1:16
11	Elsie	Stand by Me	Ben E. King	2:53
12	Tatiana Marie Clark & Denitia	Be My Baby	The Ronettes	2:42
13	Keb' Mo' & Pynk Beard	Bring It on Home to Me	Sam Cooke	4:27
14	Reyna Roberts	When a Man Loves a Woman	Percy Sledge	2:54
15	2'Live Bre & The BoykinZ	Georgia on My Mind	Ray Charles	3:20
16	Steve Ray Ladson	A Change Is Gonna Come	Sam Cooke	3:08
17	David Kushner & The Isley Brothers	By Any Means (Single Version)	Original song by Diane Warren	3:13
Total length				48:10
