= Rain Spencer =

American actress

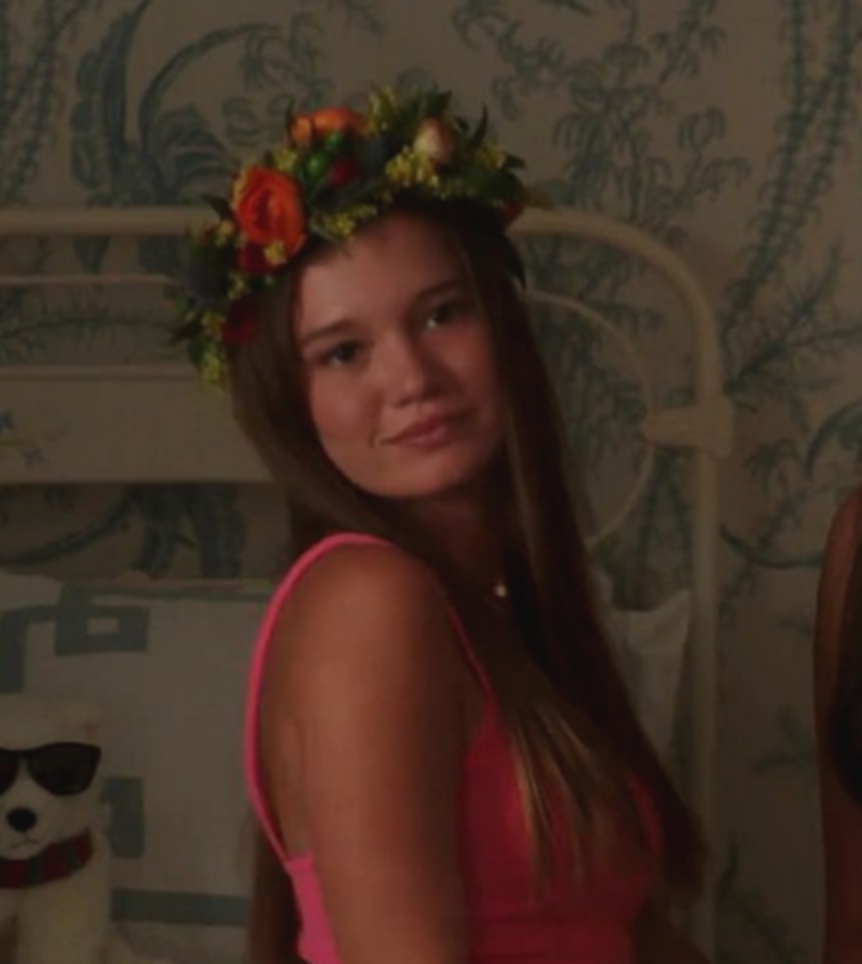
- Spencer in 2021, filming season 1 of The Summer I Turned Pretty
- Born: 1999 or 2000 (age 26–27); Germany
- Occupation: Actress
- Years active: 2010–present

Rain Spencer (born 1999 or 2000) is an American actress. She portrayed Taylor Jewel in the Amazon Prime Video series The Summer I Turned Pretty. For her work in the film Good Girl Jane (2022), Spencer won the award for Best Performance in a U.S. Narrative Feature at the Tribeca Film Festival.

== Early life ==
Spencer was born in Germany and lived there as a military brat while her father served in the United States Army.

== Career ==
As a child, Spencer played the lead character in The Garden (2010), a 4D short movie shown at the USA Pavilion in Shanghai Expo 2010, in which she, as a young girl, has a dream to create a beautiful garden from a disused urban corner plot.

Spencer made her debut playing Taylor Jewel in the Amazon Prime Video's series The Summer I Turned Pretty (2022–2025). She also played Jane in the film Good Girl Jane (2022), for which she won the award for Best Performance in a U.S. Narrative Feature at the Tribeca Film Festival.

On October 9, 2025 Spencer was cast in the starring role in Amazon Prime Video's new series Genuine Fraud.

On November 12, 2025 she was cast in the film Iconoclast.

== Filmography ==
Key
†	Denotes films that have not yet been released

=== Film ===
Year	Title	Role	Notes
2022	Good Girl Jane	Jane	
2024	Test Screening	Mia	
2026	Big Girls Don't Cry	Freya	
2026	Iconoclast	Morgan	
TBA	ANSWR †	Cassandra	
TBA	Little Five †	TBA	

=== Television ===
Year	Title	Role	Notes
2017	The Super Man	Young Girl	2 episodes
2022–2025	The Summer I Turned Pretty	Taylor Jewel	Recurring role (season 1), main cast (seasons 2–3)
TBA	Genuine Fraud †	Jule	Main role, also executive producer

=== Music videos ===
Year	Title	Artist	Notes
2022	"Lost In The Night"	Dead Man's Bones	

=== Audio series ===
Year	Title	Role(s)	Notes
2024	A Better Paradise: Volume 1: An Aftermath	Daisy Tyburn	Fiction podcast

=== Stage ===
Year	Title	Role	Ref.
2026	Dad's Leg	Connie	

== Awards ==
Year	Award	Category	Work	Result	Ref.
2022	Tribeca Film Festival	Best Actress in a U.S. Narrative Feature Film	Good Girl Jane	Won	
