= Good Girl Jane =

- Directed by: Sarah Elizabeth Mintz
- Screenplay by: Sarah Elizabeth Mintz
- Based on: Good Girl Jane by Sarah Elizabeth Mintz
- Produced by: Dominique Telson; Fred Bernstein; Lauren Pratt; Simone Williams
- Starring: Rain Spencer; Andie MacDowell
- Cinematography: Jake Saner
- Edited by: Harrison Atkins
- Music by: Kent Sparling
- Production company: Astute Films
- Distributed by: Tribeca Films
- Release date: June 11, 2022 (Tribeca)
- Running time: 118 minutes
- Country: United States
- Language: English

Good Girl Jane is a 2022 American drama film written and directed by Sarah Elizabeth Mintz and starring Rain Spencer and Andie MacDowell. It is based on Mintz's semi-autobiographical 2017 short film of the same name. It won the 2022 US Narrative Competition at the Tribeca Festival, with Spencer winning Best Performance.

== Cast ==
- Rain Spencer as Jane
- Andie MacDowell as Ruth Rosen
- Patrick Gibson as Jamie
- Nina Bloomgarden as Emma
- Odessa A'zion as Bailey
- Jules Lorenzo as Kaya
- Yeek as Xander
- Olan Prenatt as Abel
- Diego Chiat as Benji
- Eloisa Huggins as Izzie
- Gale Harold as Elliott Rosen

== Production ==
Filming began in Los Angeles in March 2020, before production was suspended due to the COVID-19 pandemic. The film later resumed and completed one year later in March 2021.

== Release ==
The film premiered on June 11, 2022, at the Tribeca Festival. It was released on demand on October 8, 2024.

== Critical response ==
On the review aggregator website Rotten Tomatoes, 69% of 13 critics' reviews are positive, with an average rating of 7.1/10.

Kristen Lopez of IndieWire gave the film a negative review and wrote, "It’s hard to shake how hollow everything feels within “Good Girl Jane.” For all the individual performances, the feature never comes off as more than a supersized short film, with certain scenes playing like filler to get to a nearly two-hour running time."

== Accolades ==
At the Tribeca Festival, the film won the Founders’ Award for Best U.S. Narrative Feature and Rain Spencer won the Best Performance award.
