= The Man Your Man Could Smell Like =

American television ad campaign

- Isaiah Mustafa as "The Man Your Man Could Smell Like"
- Agency: Wieden+Kennedy
- Client: Old Spice
- Language: English
- Running time: 0:33
- Product: Old Spice body wash
- Release dates: February 4, 2010 (online); February 8, 2010 (television)
- Directed by: Tom Kuntz
- Starring: Isaiah Mustafa
- Production company: Morton/Jankel/Zander
- Produced by: David Zander; Jeff Scruton; Scott Kaplan
- Country: United States

Smell Like a Man, Man is a television advertising campaign in the United States created by ad agency Wieden+Kennedy for the Old Spice brand of male grooming products, owned by Procter & Gamble. The campaign is commonly referred to as The Man Your Man Could Smell Like, the title of the campaign's initial 30-second commercial. The campaign was launched to market Old Spice's Red Zone After Hours Body Wash, but was subsequently expanded to include other products, following its success. The campaign targets female viewers, despite the product's intended market being male, as the company determined that women frequently make purchasing decisions for hygiene products even for male household members.

The campaign centers on the eponymous "Man Your Man Could Smell Like", played by actor Isaiah Mustafa (Old Spice refers to him as "Old Spice Man") addressing the viewer in confident, rapid-fire monologues which promote the benefit of using Old Spice products. While reciting the monologues, Mustafa progresses through various activities, locations, costumes, and extraordinary situations, all in one uninterrupted take while maintaining constant eye-contact with the camera in a nonchalant demeanor. The advertisements typically feature a surprise ending.

== Background ==
As of the early 2000s, Old Spice held position as the market leader in the U.S. for men's deodorant and body wash, with a market share of twenty percent. However, the brand was regarded as unfashionable and largely coasting on an aging reputation. Procter & Gamble had sold off several of its other older brands such as Noxzema skin cream, Sure deodorant and Comet cleanser in order to focus on products with potential for faster growth, and Old Spice was on the shortlist for a similar sale if it could not demonstrate further growth.

In 2006, Wieden+Kennedy replaced Saatchi & Saatchi as the advertising agency for the brand. Advertising spending for the account was minimal in the years running up to the handover, with campaigns aimed at holding on to the brand's primary demographic of men over thirty years old. Procter & Gamble completed its acquisition of the Gillette brand of razors and personal care products at around the same time.

The Man Your Man Could Smell Like represented a swing towards humor and lighthearted advertising aimed at a younger demographic. Old Spice took on several celebrity spokespeople popular with younger consumers, such as the actors Neil Patrick Harris and Will Ferrell, and the rap artist LL Cool J.

== Commercials ==
=== Initial commercials ===
Allen and Kallman confirmed that the commercial was filmed in a single uninterrupted take requiring three days of shooting and numerous attempts to achieve a successful take. Minimal computer-generated imagery (CGI) was used, consisting of overlaying a separately shot artificial hand during the segment where diamonds flow from Mustafa's palm and the body wash rises through the pile of diamonds with a separately filmed shot of the hand. The remaining effects were practical and achieved on-set, including a crane lifting the bathroom set from above, a crew member dropping a pre-formed shirt over Mustafa's head from above, and a cart that carried Mustafa from the boat set onto the back of a horse.

The ad was first broadcast online on 4 February 2010. It debuted on American television four days later during the commercial breaks for new episodes of American Idol and Lost and coverage of the 2010 Winter Olympics. This delay was timed to take advantage of the predicted increase interest in advertising for the days following Super Bowl XLIV. Its release was widely commented on in the American media, with features appearing in publications such as the Los Angeles Times and the New York Daily News, and Mustafa was invited to appear on several television talk shows, including The Oprah Winfrey Show. The Man Your Man Could Smell Like was a popular, critical, and financial success. By the end of June 2010, it had been viewed online over 11 million times, and had received a number of honors from the advertising and television industries, including the Grand Prix at the Cannes Lions International Advertising Festival, the most prestigious award ceremony of the marketing community. At one point in mid-July 2010, videos from the series accounted for eight of the top eleven most-popular videos on YouTube.

Filmed at the same time as the main commercial was a 15-second "sting" entitled "Did You Know", in which the camera zooms out of Mustafa to reveal that he is riding a horse backwards.

=== "Questions" and "Boat" ===
The ad expanded upon the first commercial, which featured two changes of location, and only one on camera (the bathroom "set" lifting away). In "Questions", there were more frequent changes of location with more extravagant transitions. Mustafa begins at a shower station on the beach. The scenery splits in half (as do false legs and a towel) and pulls away to reveal Mustafa log rolling before he walks across the surface of a lake (catching a falling cake mid-stride) into a kitchen (power-sawing a countertop mid-stride) to the top of a waterfall, which he "swan dives" off into a hot tub, which then collapses to reveal that Mustafa is sitting on a motorcycle, his shorts having been replaced by jeans. He performs the entire commercial without breaking eye contact with the camera, while addressing female viewers and asking rhetorical questions on what they like, implying that if their man used Old Spice, then he could bring them these things.

The ad was again shot primarily in one take, involving an automatically rolling log, an under-water platform, and a set consisting of the kitchen, waterfall and hot tub containing water and a motorcycle. The walls of the hot tub were rigged to mechanically rise and lower. Support wires were used to control Mustafa's dive from the waterfall. Footage of rehearsals of the ad begin with the log-rolling, suggesting that the opening beach segment may include separately shot or computer-generated elements. The background also appears to be enhanced.

=== "Scent Vacation" ===
Responding to interest in the creation of the previous spots, an official behind-the-scenes video was released for "Scent Vacation". It reveals that much of the ad is again produced practically, with some camera tricks. For his dive from the mountaintop, Mustafa was raised on wires as the camera spun to simulate Mustafa's movement. Ultimately, the living room in which Mustafa is shown was built against a vertical wall, and the camera was rotated 90 degrees to make the room appear normally oriented.

Unlike the previous commercials, which were shot outdoors, "Scent Vacation" was shot on a soundstage. More computer-generated imagery was used in this commercial than in the prior ads. The sand and sky of the initial beach scene and the entire mountain backdrop were added in post-production; wires were painted out, as were seams where two scenery pieces came together; fish were added to the aquarium; chocolate was added to a fondue fountain in the living room, and a stick of fondue foods was added to Mustafa's hand.

Two 15-second spots were produced, entitled "Fiji" and "Komodo" after two of the scents in the product line. In "Fiji", a beach scene is shown as Mustafa's voice is heard. Mustafa rises from beneath the sand with an acoustic guitar, which he opens to reveal that it contains puppies.

In "Komodo", Mustafa appears to stand at the base of a hill atop which sits an ancient palace. The palace is revealed to be a miniature, as Mustafa opens the front wall to reveal the product. He then walks over to a Komodo dragon and pulls open its back to reveal a cooler containing ice cream.

The three spots share a common thread of misleading items containing other items. Aside from the guitar, the palace and the Komodo dragon, in "Scent Vacation" Mustafa also picks up a mountain goat, which he spins around to reveal a harp.

=== Additional materials ===
In 2018, Mustafa appeared in one of Tide's Super Bowl LII commercials. The ad was one of several crossovers in which other commercials (including other Procter & Gamble brands' advertising campaigns for Old Spice and Mr. Clean) segued into Tide ads because all of the clothes in them were fresh and clean, including Mustafa's white pants. In 2019, Mustafa appeared in an ad for Hulu that parodied these commercials.

== Reception ==
The New York Daily News gave the initial ad a favorable mention, citing Mustafa's "wildly smug, cool-cat smooth dude persona", which "helped make the cologne commercial pop". People magazine's Blane Bachelor called Mustafa's monologue "sharply scripted" and his character "smug, and over the top". The commercial was a hit on video-sharing websites, such as YouTube, where it had received over 60 million views by February 22, 2022. In June 2010 the ad won the Grand Prix for film at the Cannes Lions International Advertising Festival, and in July 2010 it won a Primetime Emmy Award for Outstanding Commercial.

The created feeling of connection between the Old Spice Man and the audience, known as a parasocial relationship, was important to the campaign's success. Overall this combined with the original ad series to become one of the "most popular viral campaigns in recent history".

== In popular culture ==
The spot has been parodied on Sesame Street, where the monster Grover takes Mustafa's role to illustrate the word 'on'. However, his narrations do not go as smoothly: the dropped shirt fails to fall around his neck; the clam containing the tickets bites his nose, forcing him to fling it away; and despite claiming he is on a horse at the end, he is actually on a cow.

There was also a parody released in 2011, close to the release of the film Puss in Boots, and in 2019, featuring Mustafa, to advertise Hulu.

It was parodied by How It Should Have Ended for an episode on It Chapter Two, in which the character Mike (who is played by Mustafa in the film) puts his own spin on the commercial's lines.

In 2018, fellow Procter & Gamble brand Tide released a series of Super Bowl advertisements. One commercial featured Mustafa as "The Man Your Man Could Smell Like", only to be interrupted by the presence of David Harbour, who declares that it is a Tide ad instead.

For Super Bowl LIX, Instacart produced a teaser for their commercial featuring Mustafa promoting the app with the horse, the Pillsbury Doughboy and the Wiener dogs from Kraft-Heinz’s 2016 Super Bowl commercial making an appearance. The actual commercial features Mustafa with the horse briefly standing on a customer’s doorstep saying “I’m on a porch” before transforming into a bottle of Old Spice deodorant.

== Follow-up campaigns ==
Advertisement ending screen as appeared on "And So It Begins"

In August 2015 Weiden+Kennedy released Make a Smellmitment with Mustafa reprising the role of "Old Spice Man" and Terry Crews as his previous Old Spice character. Like "The Man Your Man Could Smell Like" advertisements, these were also filmed in long single shots with Mustafa and Crews engaging in random activities. The advertising campaign is marketing the "Timber", "Swagger", and "Bearglove" fragrances. The campaign focuses on the contrast between the smooth-talking Mustafa, talking to the female audience, and the screaming Crews, talking to the male audience, who are interrupting each other.

The content of the new campaign ads also consist of character monologues during long single shots while engaging in random activities and addressing the female audience. This advertising campaign markets Old Spice's "Bearglove" and "Timber" fragrances ("Swagger" replaces "Timber" in some commercials). Mustafa's character (referred to as the "Old Spice Man"). Crews also reprised his Old Spice character that targets the male audience. The theme of the campaign focuses on the contrast between the smooth-talking monologues by Mustafa and screaming Crews interrupting each other as they advertise Old Spice Timber/Swagger and Bearglove respectively. The commercials usually end with the two men each holding up their respective products side by side, trying to draw the viewer's attention.

The initial commercial, titled "And So It Begins", lasts 1:02 minutes and was released on August 6, 2015. The commercial was created by Jason Bagley and Craig Allen of Wieden+Kennedy Portland and directed by Tom Kuntz. The commercial opens with a monologue by Isaiah Mustafa talking to the female audience about their men and embracing nature. In one shot, Mustafa moves from a bathroom to a forest to a jewelry store before moving to a canoe and being interrupted by Terry Crews who projectiles out of the water. The two men acknowledge appearing together in a commercial at the same time with the exchange "Guess who?", "It's you", "it's me, goodbye!" Crews stomps on the canoe, catapulting Mustafa out of the frame and screams "Don't use Timber, use Bearglove!" He continues screaming as he moves to a kitchen followed by the top of an erupting volcano and finally riding a motorcycle with five more of him and a tiger. To end the commercial, the motorcycle crashes into Mustafa's head as he says "stop it" and the camera closes in on the two products being held up Crews and Mustafa respectively side by side.

Three months after its release, the video on Old Spice's YouTube channel had received 11.6 million views and 53,000 likes on YouTube. On September 14, 2015, a complementary video titled "Make a Smellmitment: Behind The Scenes" was uploaded on Old Spice's YouTube channel featuring Crews and Mustafa discussing the new campaign.

On August 13, 2015, the second video of the campaign was uploaded to Old Spice's YouTube channel, titled "Interruption". Mustafa opened with a monologue about using Old Spice Swagger and Crews suddenly appeared to interrupt Mustafa and scream "Bearglove!". The commercial takes place in a fancy hall with Mustafa in the middle of the frame while multiple miniature images of Crews appear on the borders of the screen yelling "Bearglove!" The commercial ends with the familiar shot of Crews screaming "Bearglove!" and Mustafa saying "stop it". The two men hold up the Old Spice products side by side but this time Crews blocks the product Mustafa is holding up with his own product.
