= Brian Ash =

American producer and screenwriter

- Born: September 29, 1974 (age 52); Bronx, New York, U.S.
- Occupations: Producer, screenwriter, writer

Brian Ash (born September 29, 1974 in Bronx, New York) is an American producer and screenwriter.

Brian Ash is a writer and co-executive producer of Black Dynamite: The Animated Series on Adult Swim and the author of the graphic novel, Black Dynamite: Slave Island.

Previously, Ash was a writer and producer of Adult Swim's The Boondocks, FX's Chozen and a creative consultant on Freaknik: The Musical. His other TV writing credits include The Jellies!, Lazor Wulf, Jamie Foxx's In the Flow and Playhouse Disney's Imagination Movers. Brian also wrote and produced animated segments for season two of Lewis Black's Root of All Evil on Comedy Central and was a writer, producer and director of the web sketch comedy series, The Super Rumble Mix Show.

In features, Ash was a writer and co-producer on Universal Pictures' and Roc-A-Fella Films' Paper Soldiers (the first feature film to star Kevin Hart) and has developed and written screenplays for Lion's Gate Films.

With a background in music videos and New York independent film, Ash landed his first production deal with the late George Jackson's UBO Network. There, he created IndiePlanet, an animated online series later syndicated by Sci-Fi Network.

In 2005, he wrote, produced and directed See Paris Die! an animated campaign for the Paris Hilton Warner Bros. film, House of Wax. In 2001, Ash received World Animation Celebration's Best Animated Drama award for The Road to Graceland, a trilogy of animated prequels to the Warner Bros. release, 3000 Miles to Graceland. Starring Kevin Costner and Christian Slater, the project marked the first time a major film's cast created original content for the internet.

Bronx raised and Yeshiva educated, Brian Ash is an alumnus of NYU's Tisch School of the Arts Film & TV program.
