= Boy Kills World =

2023 film by Moritz Mohr

- Theatrical release poster
- Directed by: Moritz Mohr
- Screenplay by: Tyler Burton Smith; Arend Remmers
- Story by: Arend Remmers; Moritz Mohr
- Based on: Boy Kills World by: Armend Remmers; Moritz Mohr
- Produced by: Sam Raimi; Zainab Azizi; Roy Lee; Wayne Fitzjohn; Simon Swart; Stuart Manashil; Dan Kagan; Alex Lebovici
- Starring: Bill Skarsgård; Jessica Rothe; Michelle Dockery; Brett Gelman; Isaiah Mustafa; Yayan Ruhian; Andrew Koji; Sharlto Copley; H. Jon Benjamin; Famke Janssen
- Cinematography: Peter Matjasko
- Edited by: Lucian Barnard
- Music by: Ludvig Forssell
- Production companies: Nthibah Pictures; Vertigo Entertainment; Hammerstone Studios; Raimi Productions
- Distributed by: Constantin Film (Germany); Empire Entertainment (South Africa); Lionsgate Films; Roadside Attractions (United States)
- Release dates: September 9, 2023 (TIFF); April 26, 2024 (United States)
- Running time: 111 minutes
- Countries: Germany; South Africa; United States
- Language: English
- Box office: $3.3 million

Boy Kills World is a 2023 dystopian action comedy film starring Bill Skarsgård. Directed by Moritz Mohr, in his feature directorial debut, the film's supporting cast includes Jessica Rothe, Michelle Dockery, Brett Gelman, Isaiah Mustafa, Yayan Ruhian, Andrew Koji, Sharlto Copley, with Famke Janssen, and features the voice of H. Jon Benjamin. The plot revolves around a campaign of vengeance enacted by a martial arts expert, rendered deaf-mute by an attack that killed his entire family, whose thoughts are presented as an inner voice derived from a childhood video game.

Boy Kills World had its world premiere at the 2023 Toronto International Film Festival, and was released in the United States by Lionsgate Films and Roadside Attractions on April 26, 2024. A spin-off video game, Super Dragon Punch Force 3, was released on April 24, 2024, and an animated series is in development.

== Plot ==
Boy, a young child, lives in a dystopian city with his mother and younger sister Mina. Boy and Mina often play arcade games and draw illustrations of their future. The city is ruled by the Van Der Koy family: Gideon, Melanie, Melanie's husband Glen and the former two's sister and the head of the family - Hilda. Once a year, Hilda gathers 12 people from the city to participate in The Culling, where all twelve are killed on live television. Hilda gathers Boy, Mina and their mother and shoots Mina and their mother, killing them, but leaves Boy for dead, having made him deaf and mute. An unnamed Shaman finds Boy and nurses him back to health.

Years later, a fully grown Boy continues training with the Shaman in the hopes of exacting revenge and constantly hallucinates Mina. In the city, Boy sees Glen and Gideon arrive to round up the victims for that year's Culling. After being heckled by a woman in the crowd, Glen accidentally shoots a civilian, triggering a massacre at the hands of June 27, the Van Der Koy's enforcer. Boy follows them in the trunk of Gideon's car to a warehouse, where he is attacked by Glen and several of his men. Boy kills the men and befriends a captive named Basho, with whom he interrogates Glen. Glen reveals that Hilda hosts a party before The Culling every year and offers to help them, but is killed when Basho accidentally drops a vice he is holding onto Glen's head.

Basho takes Boy to meet the Resistance, but discovers that everybody has been killed by the Van Der Koys except one member named Benny. The three sneak into the manor and Boy makes his way to Hilda's dining room, where he unwittingly decapitates a decoy of Hilda. Gideon reveals that the party is a scripted ruse orchestrated to trap anyone who may want Hilda dead, and Boy is subsequently captured by June 27 after a vicious duel. Gideon reveals that he wishes to help Boy; Hilda has created The Culling to protect herself from the Shaman, but has been living in a bunker for years, mindlessly killing innocents even though all of the criminals have been wiped out.

Melanie takes Boy to The Culling and Boy uses a scalpel given to him by Gideon in secret to free himself, reuniting with Basho and Benny. A large battle ensues, during which Benny sacrifices himself to protect Boy, and Basho is mortally wounded. Boy executes Melanie and makes his way to Hilda's bunker together with Basho, where Boy is so focused on killing the guards that he misses Basho dying from his wounds. Boy discovers Gideon, having been shot by Melanie, who gives him a key card to the elevator down to the bunker. The hallucination of Mina begs Boy not to kill Gideon, but Boy executes him and the hallucination disappears.

In the elevator, Hilda confronts Boy through a camera and microphone. Boy shows Hilda a drawing by Mina, horrifying her into ordering the guards outside to stand down. June 27 takes Boy to Hilda, where Boy sees paintings of the Van Der Koy family, which include him and Mina. Hilda reveals that Boy is her son, and he recalls that she forced him to kill dissidents, including the Shaman's entire family. When Boy refused to shoot the Shaman and fled, the Shaman captured him, mutilated him, and used LSD and psychological torture to brainwash him into believing that Hilda killed his family. June 27 is revealed to be Mina, who is still alive.

In shock, Boy cannot give Hilda any signs of affection and she orders June 27/Mina to kill him, only for her to stab Hilda in the head with one of her hatchets, leading their great grandmother to order the guards to kill them before dying. Brother and sister battle their way through the remaining guards before being confronted by the Shaman. The three have a lengthy and brutal fight before Boy fatally stabs the Shaman with his own sharpened necklace. Boy and Mina, both bleeding profusely but alive, exit the bunker. A flashback shows the two playing the arcade game, where the voice announces, "Player 2 Has Entered the Game".

In the post-credits scene, Boy and Mina are revealed to have survived and are shown eating cereal together at their childhood home.

== Cast ==
- Bill Skarsgård as Boy, a deaf-mute man seeking revenge against the Van Der Koy's. Mohr, the director, occasionally questioned his decision to make the character a deaf-mute amidst other challenges but ultimately had no regrets and was grateful for the outcome.
  - H. Jon Benjamin as Boy's "inner voice"
  - Nicholas and Cameron Crovetti as young Boy
- Jessica Rothe as June 27 / Mina Van Der Koy, an enforcer working for the Van Der Koy's
  - Quinn Copeland as young Mina, Boy's younger sister
- Famke Janssen as Hilda Van Der Koy, the matriarch of the Van Der Koy family
- Michelle Dockery as Melanie Van Der Koy, Hilda and Gideon's sister
- Brett Gelman as Gideon Van Der Koy, Hilda and Melanie's brother
- Isaiah Mustafa as Benny, a resistance member
- Andrew Koji as Basho, a resistance member
- Sharlto Copley as Glen Van Der Koy, Melanie's husband
- Yayan Ruhian as Shaman, Boy's mentor
  - François Chau as Shaman's voice
- Dorothy Ann Gould as Beatrice Van Der Koy

== Production ==
Director and story writer Moritz Mohr pitched Boy Kills World with a short and previsualization reel to Sam Raimi and Roy Lee, of Raimi Productions and Vertigo Entertainment respectively, who were impressed and subsequently agreed to produce alongside Nthibah Pictures and Hammerstone Studios. Orion Pictures was initially involved, but dropped out following the COVID-19 pandemic.

The film was announced on October 7, 2021, with Bill Skarsgård, Samara Weaving, and Yayan Ruhian joining the cast. In a statement, Nthibah CEO Simon Swart said the film would combine "real-world themes with a stylized look that is fresh, cool, and original, borrowing from the best of graphic novels." On October 28, 2021, Isaiah Mustafa joined the cast. In January 2022, Andrew Koji was added to the cast, and Jessica Rothe replaced Samara Weaving, who dropped out of the project due to scheduling conflicts. Filming began in Cape Town, South Africa, on February 14, 2022. In March 2022, Famke Janssen, Brett Gelman, Sharlto Copley, Quinn Copeland, twins Cameron and Nicholas Crovetti, and Michelle Dockery were confirmed to star.

In August 2023, Swedish composer Ludvig Forssell was announced to compose the film's soundtrack. The film also features nine pieces of additional music by El Michels Affair.

== Release ==
The world premiere for Boy Kills World was held at the 2023 Toronto International Film Festival on September 9, 2023.

The film was theatrically released in the United States on April 26, 2024, by Lionsgate Films and Roadside Attractions.

== Reception ==
=== Box office ===
Boy Kills World grossed $2.6 million in the United States and Canada, and $643,341 in other territories, for a worldwide total of $3.3 million.

In the United States and Canada, Boy Kills World was released alongside Unsung Hero and Challengers, and was projected to gross $2–3 million from 1,993 theatres in its opening weekend. The film made $819,000 on its first day, including $500,000 from preview screenings. It went on to debut to $1.6 million.

=== Critical response ===
The film received mixed reviews from critics. On the review aggregator website Rotten Tomatoes, 58% of 170 critics' reviews are positive, with an average rating of 5.6/10. The website's consensus reads: "Bolstered by Bill Skarsgård's all-in performance, Boy Kills World may offer just enough action thrills to offset its thinly written characters and predictable plot." Metacritic, which uses a weighted average, assigned the film a score of 47 out of 100, based on 27 critics, indicating "mixed or average" reviews. Audiences polled by CinemaScore gave the film an average grade of "B–" on an A+ to F scale, while those polled by PostTrak gave it a 71% overall positive score, with 50% saying they would definitely recommend it.

The Guardian's Catherine Bray gave the film 3/5 stars, writing, "Skarsgård is a treat in the role; the character is deaf and mute, so his performance approaches something of a lethal Buster Keaton... Unfortunately, you will often find yourself hoping the film can match his level." Tim Robey of The Daily Telegraph gave it 4/5 stars, saying it was "pushy and zany and maybe won't stand a rewatch, but maybe it will. The game physicality of it won me over." The Globe and Mail's Radheyan Simonpillai called it "a cheeky post-Deadpool comedy – irreverent to a fault – with grindhouse aesthetics that tend to feel inspired by Quentin Tarantino rather than the movies that inspired Quentin Tarantino."

The Age's Jake Wilson gave it 2.5/5 stars, writing, "Have I grown jaded? Maybe so. But it could be, too, that Boy Kills World suffers from the wrong kind of excess, not just in its approach to action but in the design of the plot, which piles one gimmick on top of another." Sophie Butcher of Empire wrote, "Despite some fun action excess and an impressively committed performance from Bill Skarsgård, Boy Kills World is a muddled, tiring mess, favouring violent shocks over cohesive storytelling." She gave it 2/5 stars.

== Follow-ups ==
=== Video game ===
A spin-off video game, Super Dragon Punch Force 3, based on the arcade game of the same name in the film, was released on April 24, 2024.

=== Animated series ===
A spin-off animated television series of the film based on the in-universe arcade game Super Dragon Punch Force 3, written by Mario Carvalhal and Judd Fitzjohn, is in development as of April 2024.
