= Old Spice =

American brand of male grooming products

- Product type: Men's grooming products
- Current owner: Procter & Gamble
- Country: United States
- Introduced: June 19, 1937; 89 years ago (as Early American Old Spice)
- Markets: Worldwide
- Previous owners: Shulton Company
- Tagline: "Smell like a man, man."
- Website: oldspice.com

Old Spice is an American brand offering male grooming products including aftershaves, deodorants and antiperspirants, shampoos, body washes, shaving cream, and soaps. It is manufactured by Procter & Gamble. Old Spice was launched as an expansion of the Early American Old Spice line created by William Lightfoot Schultz's soap and toiletries company, Shulton Inc., in 1937. Early American Old Spice was marketed to women, and Old Spice was marketed as a men's fragrance and released before Christmas 1937.

== History ==
Old Spice products were originally manufactured by the Shulton Company, founded in 1937 by William Lightfoot Schultz. A buyer at Bullock's in Los Angeles made Schultz aware of the emerging popularity of colonial American–style furniture, a trend spurred by the then-recent opening of Colonial Williamsburg. Shultz reasoned that an Early Americana–themed cosmetics line might also find favor. The Metropolitan Museum of Art in New York collection of early American objects provided a source of inspiration for packaging design; for the fragrance, Schultz was inspired by his mother's potpourri, and as a result, the first Old Spice product in 1937 was a woman's scent called Early American Old Spice. The product was received well and therefore was followed by Old Spice for men in 1938.

In 1970, Shulton became a subsidiary of American Cyanamid. In June 1990, Procter & Gamble purchased the Old Spice brand from American Cyanamid.

== Products ==
=== Original fragrance ===
Schultz worked with perfumer Bert Hauck at Dodge & Olcott to create Early American Old Spice, which was marketed as a women's fragrance. They began with a scent Hauck had already developed, then refined it by adding notes until it evoked Schultz's memory of his grandmother's spice jug. The finished fragrance is categorized as a spicy amber on the modern fragrance wheel, with notes of rose petals and cloves. Shulton launched Early American Old Spice in 1937. Hauck developed Old Spice as a variation of Early American Old Spice to be marketed to men. Like Early American, it is an amber fragrance but it has citrus notes:

- Top notes: Notably orange; also aldehydes, allspice, clary sage, lemon, lime, and star anise
- Middle notes: Notably cinnamon and clove; also bay leaf, geranium, heliotrope, jasmine, nutmeg, pimento berry, and rose
- Base notes: Notably vanilla and musk; also amber, benzoin, cedarwood, olibanum, and tonka bean

Perfumers have noted that Old Spice shares dominant notes with Coca-Cola (citrus, cinnamon, and vanilla), as well as l'Eau de Lubin (1798) by Parfums Lubin.

In response to a customer review in 2019, Old Spice stated that the Original After Shave scent was changed in 2016 'to comply with new regulations.'

=== Bottle and packaging ===
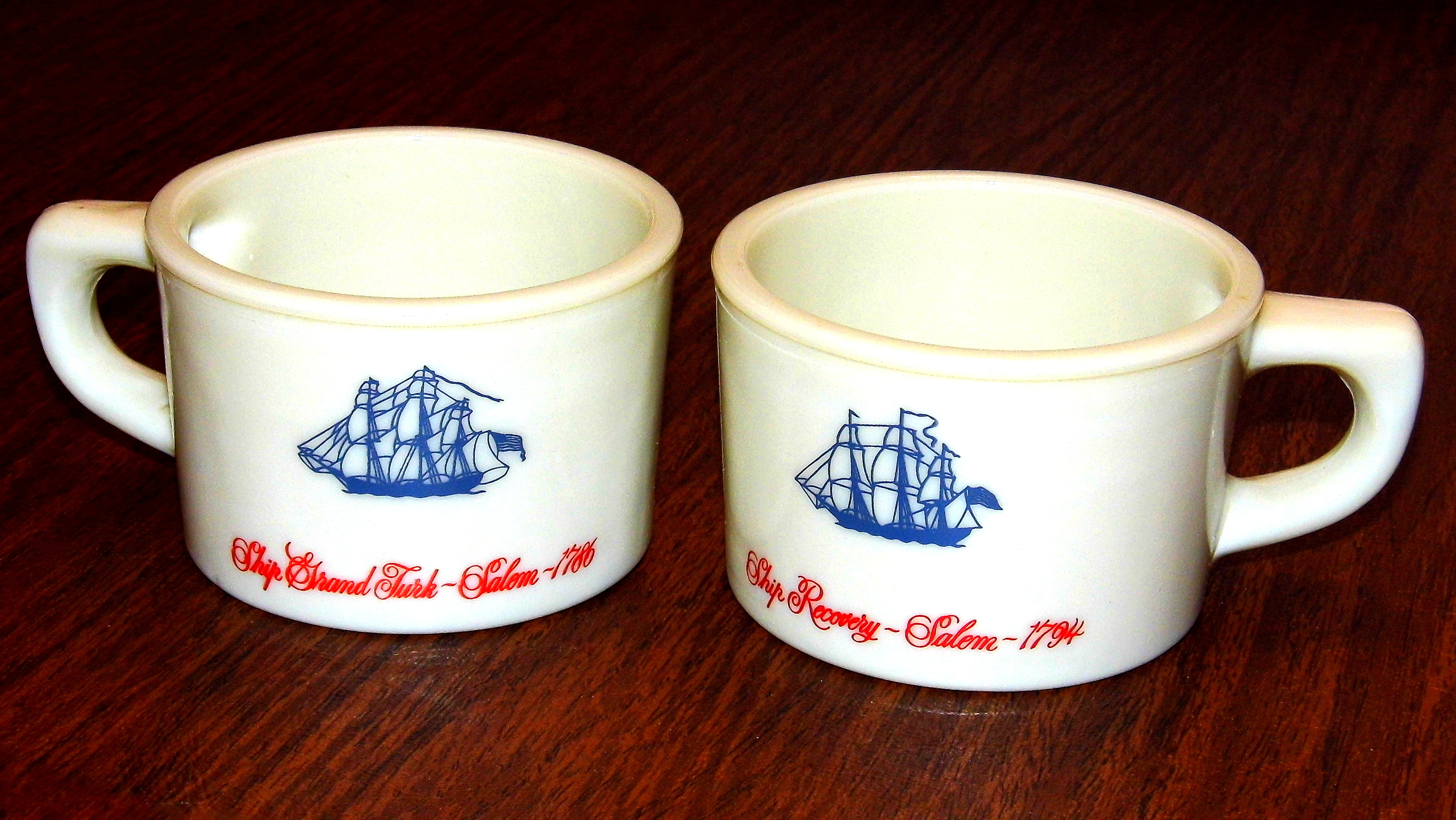
Shaving mugs with the Grand Turk and Recovery ships

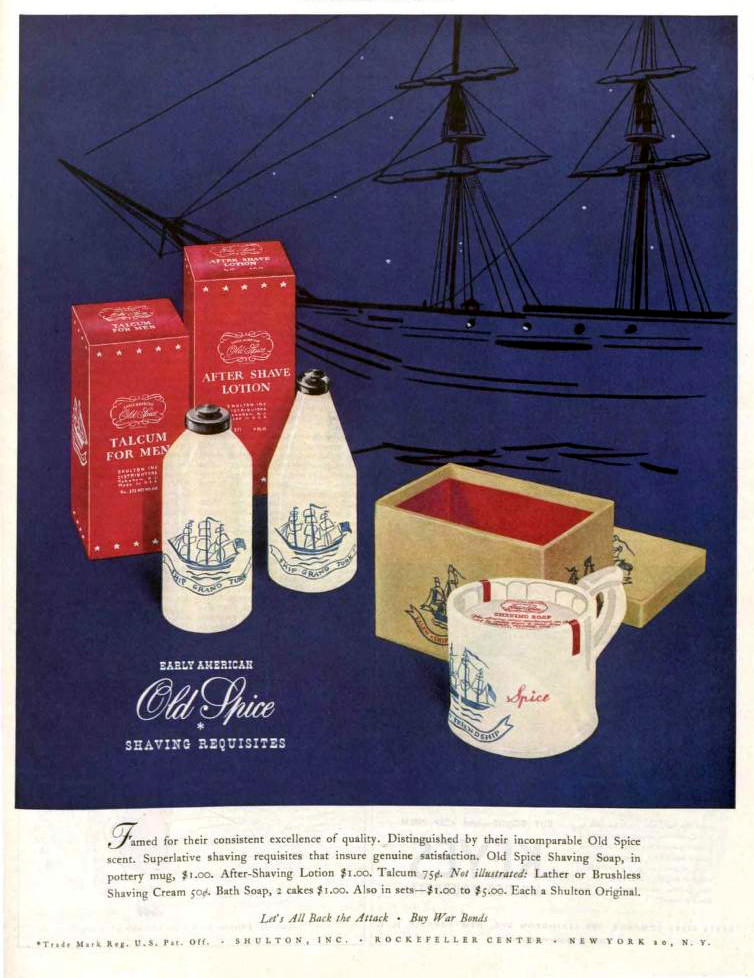
1944 advertisement shows product packaging

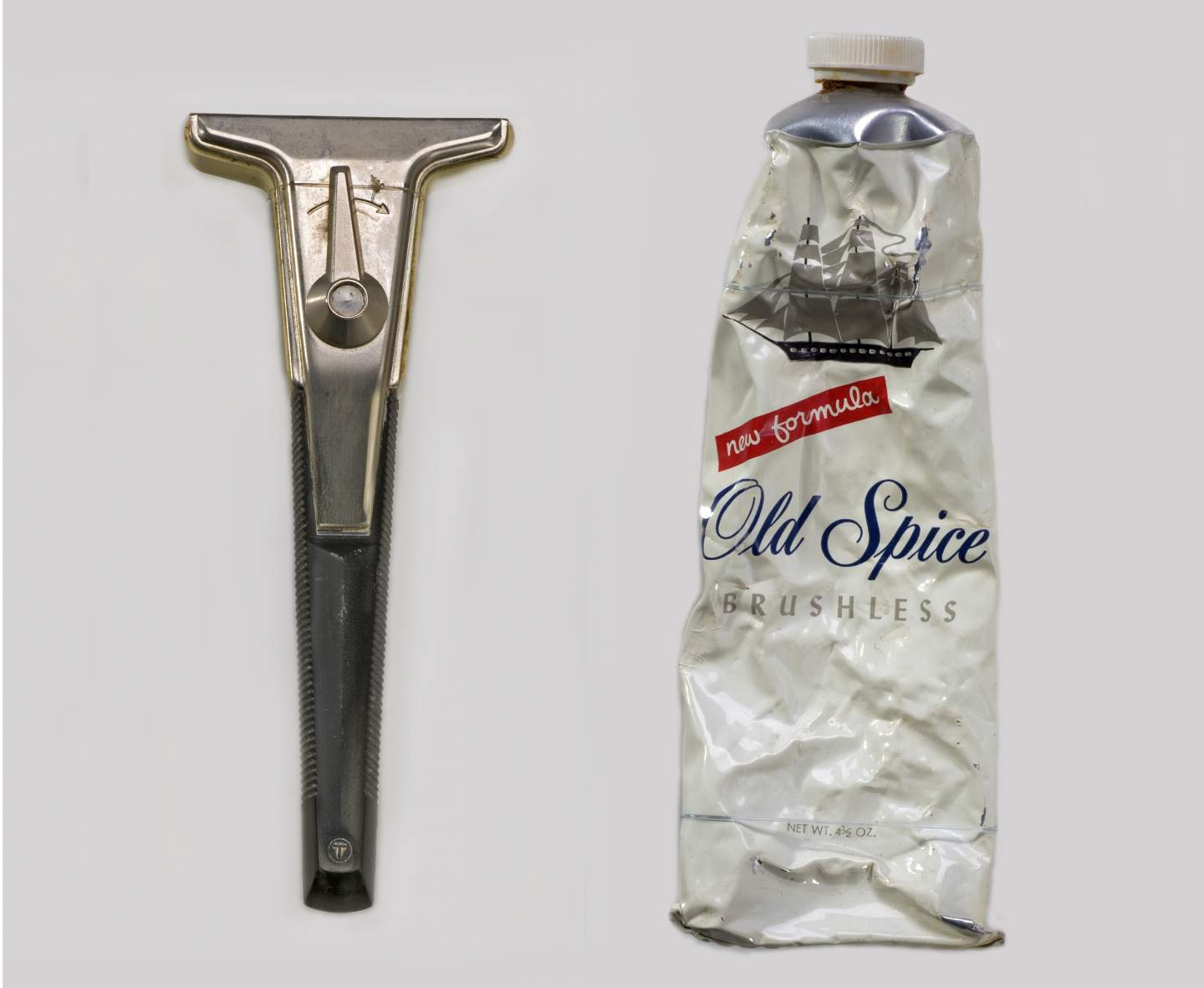
This razor and shaving cream was used by the Apollo 11 crew members during the flight.

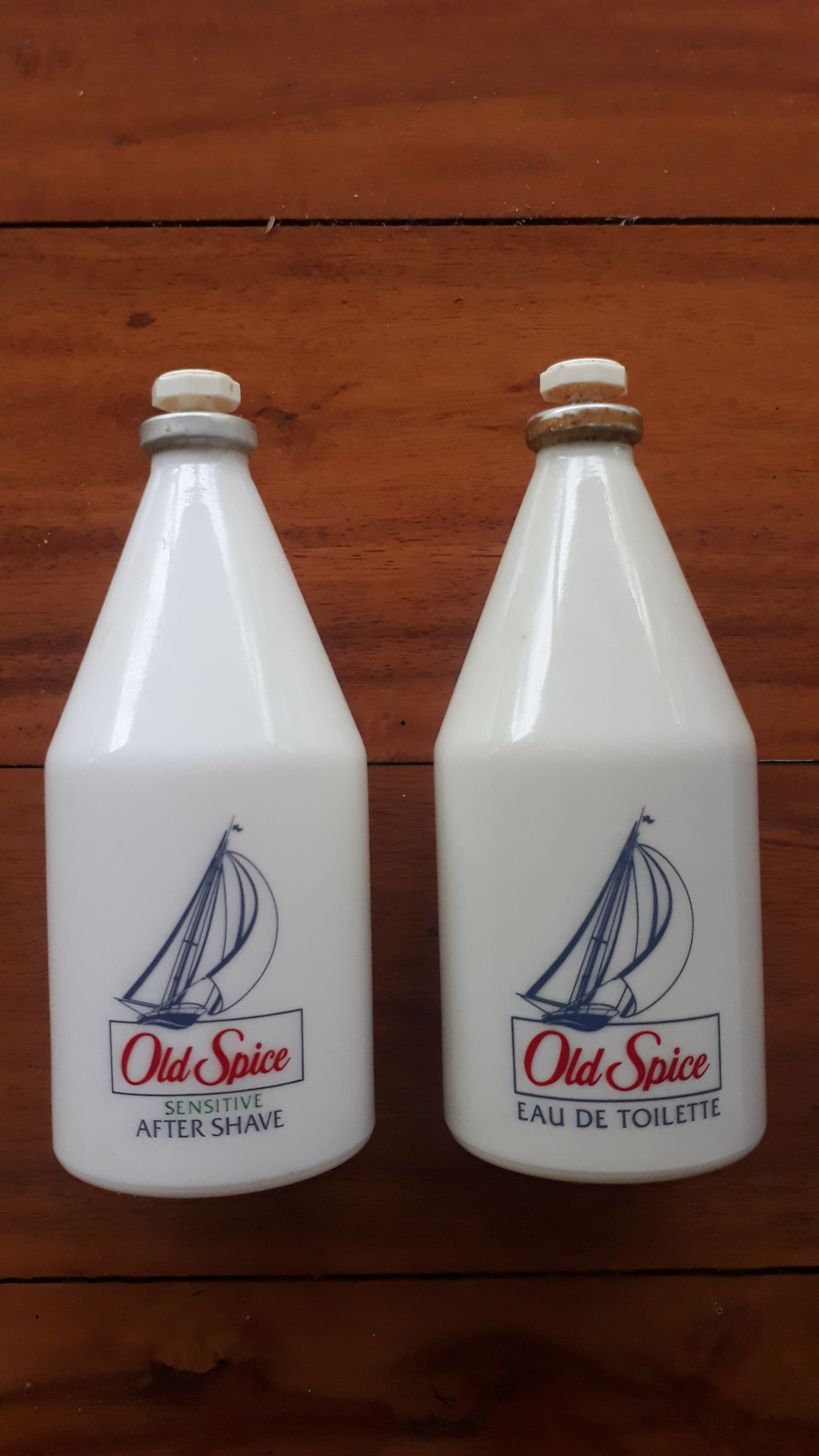
Bottles from 1992 with sailboat drawings

Artist Enid Edson designed the original packaging. For Early American Old Spice, her inspiration was Zeruah H. Huernsey Caswell's hand-embroidered carpet displayed at the Metropolitan Museum of Art. For Old Spice, her inspiration was Colonial-era apothecary bottles. A.E. Hull Pottery Company developed the first aftershave and cologne bottles, which were made of white pottery with hand-painted drawings of the Grand Turk privateer used during the American Revolutionary War. In about 1948, a second ship drawing was added: the 1794 Recovery Salem. The bottles were packaged in cardboard boxes that had drawings of five different ships. In the mid-1940s, the packaging changed from pottery to glass. Wheaton Glass Company developed the glass, which had the luster of pottery.

In the 1990s, after Proctor & Gamble bought the fragrance line, they made other changes: the sailing ship was replaced by a sailboat; the glass bottles of eau de toilette and after shave had a plastic button as a cap; and its color was changed from light gray to white in 1992. In 2008, the white glass bottles gave way to plastic and the gray stoppers to red.

Old Spice's buoy-shaped bottle cologne or aftershave is available in its original scent as well as Pure Sport.

==== Ships ====
Almost all of the vessels named on Old Spice packaging correspond to real ships, most of which are drawn from Salem, Massachusetts's historic merchant fleet, with a smaller number honoring famous U.S. Navy frigates and 19th-century racing yachts; only after Procter & Gamble's 1990 acquisition of the brand did the packaging shift to an unnamed, generic sailboat/yacht logo. Paintings of many of these ships are in the Peabody Essex Museum, which holds the collection of the former Peabody Museum of Salem.

Ship name	Packaging	Ship notes
Grand Turk	1938–1990s Original ship logo; also on the 1986 commemorative nautical stein	300-ton privateer commissioned by Elias Hasket Derby for use in the American Revolutionary War and later the first ship on the Old China Trade.
Friendship	1940–unknown	Built in 1796–1797, the 342-ton ship launched from Salem to make 15 voyages to China, Indonesia, India, Venezuela, Spain, and Russia. It was captured by the British during the War of 1812.
Recovery	1940s–1992 Cologne bottle in the 1940s; shaving mugs from the 1960s until mugs were discontinued in 1992.	The first American vessel to visit Mokha, it traveled from Salem, Massachusetts to Mokha, Yemen, and back, helping start the American coffee trade.
Mount Vernon	1940s–unspecified Used on packaging for talcum in about 1945; in 1952, it appears on a travel talc bottle as the only Old Spice ship to travel to sail to the right	A 350-ton ship from Salem and owned and commanded by Elias Hasket Derby, it engaged with French frigates off the coast of Spain during the Napoleonic Wars while carrying Cuban sugar.
Sooloo I	unspecified	A 440-ton ship built in 1840 and owned by Salem merchants trading with China, the Philippines, Java, and other Southeast Asian ports; she was lost off the coast of Sumatra in 1855.
USS Essex	1940s–1950s On some gift set boxes	A 32-gun sailing frigate built in Salem and launched in 1799; it participated in several wars before it was captured in the War of 1812.
Experiment	1940s–mid-1950s	The brigantine Experiment of Newburyport was built in Amesbury, Massachusetts in 1803.
Flying Cloud	1985; On a flask decanter	Built in Boston, this clipper set a world record for the fastest passage from New York to San Antonio, which she held from 1854–1989.
Ariel	1990; On the 1990 commemorative nautical stein	Famous tea clipper ship of the 1860s that made voyages between China and England.
Columbia (1899 yacht)	1989; On the 1989 commemorative nautical stein	A yacht that won the America's Cup races in 1899 and 1901.
12 Metre	1988; On a 1988 etched glass stein	Image was of a generic 12 Metre racing sloop racing in the America's Cup; it was not a named vessel.
Magic (Madgie)	1989; On a commemorative flask	92-ton centerboard schooner yacht, built 1867; won the America's Cup in 1870.
Birmingham	1970s On boxed gift sets, this resembled an oil painting	Product inscription only identifies it as "Ship Birmingham, New York, 1825"
Hamilton	1970s On boxed gift sets, this resembled an oil painting	A 164-ton brig built at Scituate, Massachusetts
Maria Theresa	1970s On boxed gift sets, this resembled an oil painting	A schooner built in Newburyport
Propontis	1970s On boxed gift sets, this resembled an oil painting	A Salem ship built by Thatcher Magoun in 1833
Salem	1970s On boxed gift sets, this resembled an oil painting	
John Wesley	1970s On boxed gift sets, this resembled an oil painting	A barque built in 1852, in Searsport, Maine.
Star of the West	1970s' On boxed gift sets, this resembled an oil painting	Product inscription only identifies it as "Star of the West, Cohasset, 1840"
USS Constitution and HMS Java	unspecified Commemorative boxed set with cannon-shaped bottle	On December 29, 1812 in a single-ship action, the USS Constitution defeated and sank HMS Java off Brazil
United States	unspecified	

=== Expanded line ===
In the 1970s, Old Spice shifted from being a shaving brand to a fragrance brand by introducing signature scents like Old Spice Burley.

Throughout the 2000s, Procter & Gamble introduced many forms of deodorant, body washes, and body sprays in several scents under the Old Spice name. In early 2008, the original Old Spice scent was repackaged as "Classic Scent", both in the aftershave and cologne versions. Old Spice Classic shower gel was sold using the slogan "The original. If your grandfather hadn't worn it, you wouldn't exist."

In 2006, Old Spice introduced a fragrance, OS Signature.

In 2014, Old Spice expanded its product line-up to men's haircare by introducing shampoos, two-in-one shampoo and conditioners, and styling products.

== Advertising ==
=== Jingle and sound mark ===
Old Spice has used variations of its whistle jingle since 1953. The melody was inspired by the folk tune, "Scotland the Brave". Originally, the "Old Spice Sea Shanty" was a full song, created by Ginger Johnson for the company. Toots Thielemans was the whistler in recordings. In the 1990s, it was stripped down to an eight-note penny whistle tune that is still used in the 2020s.

=== "The Mark of a Man" surfer campaigns ===
In the late 1970s and 1980s, Old Spice television advertising campaigns in the United Kingdom and Ireland featured a man on a surfboard accompanied by Carl Orff's O Fortuna from Carmina Burana, with the tagline "Old Spice – The Mark Of A Man"; and was featured on The 100 Greatest TV Ads.

=== "The Man Your Man Could Smell Like" and viral campaigns ===
An advertising campaign developed by Wieden + Kennedy in 2010 featuring Isaiah Mustafa became popular after the first advertisement, titled "The Man Your Man Could Smell Like". Following this campaign, Old Spice introduced Fabio Lanzoni to challenge Isaiah Mustafa for the Old Spice Guy title in an online advertising campaign.

After the success of "The Man Your Man Could Smell Like", Old Spice released "The Response Campaign". Over the course of two and a half days, the brand filmed 186 videos featuring Mustafa engaging in conversation with fans and celebrities.

In 2013, the Old Spice Scratch 'N Sniff banner ad campaign promised to let visitors "smell the Internet": people could provide their contact information and receive a sniffable banner in the mail. This campaign was designed by Wieden+Kennedy to launch the Wolfthorn line.

The commercial "Momsong" became popular in 2014 as a part of the brand's "Smellcome to Manhood" campaign.

In early 2016, Old Spice introduced a new brand character, the Legendary Man, with two TV commercials, "Rocket Car" and "Whale", to launch the Hardest Working Collection. Old Spice also launched a series of digital infomercials with Canadian actor Steven Ogg. Later in 2016, the brand introduced two additional Old Spice characters, actors Thomas Beaudoin and Alberto Cardenas, in an advertising campaign for the Red Zone product collection.

In 2019, Old Spice named actor, comedian, and writer Deon Cole as its global brand ambassador for its five-piece line. In January 2020, Old Spice brought back their viral 2010 campaign "Smell Like a Man, Man" to celebrate the tenth anniversary of the original commercial, and worked with Wieden + Kennedy once again for the reboot.

=== Sports sponsorships ===
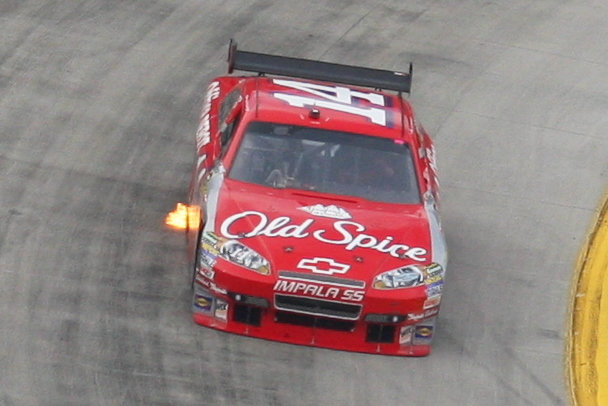
Tony Stewart's No. 14 Old Spice/Office Depot Chevrolet at Martinsville Speedway in 2009

Old Spice has partnered with the NFL and featured football stars including Ray Lewis, Greg Jennings, and Wes Welker in various TV and digital campaigns. In 2012, former NFL player Terry Crews was featured in the brand's viral hit "Muscle Music". The interactive video allowed people to make music through different musical instruments rigged to corresponding muscles on Crews's body.

Old Spice has sponsored many cars throughout the NASCAR world from 2004 to 2010. They first sponsored Ricky Craven at Talladega in 2004, then moved to Tony Stewart in Busch Races with Joe Gibbs Racing and Kevin Harvick Incorporated. In 2009, they followed Stewart when he formed his own team and car number 14 car for 2009 and 2010 with a win at Watkins Glen. Old Spice returned to NASCAR in 2019 to sponsor Corey LaJoie and Go Fas Racing's 32 car for the 2019 Daytona 500. The car had a unique design in which Corey LaJoie's face was designed on the hood of the car. The team finished 18th in that race. Old Spice was also featured as the sponsor of John C. Reilly's character, Cal Naughton Jr., in the 2006 comedy Talladega Nights. The brand returned to the sport for a one-off appearance in 2023, sponsoring Chase Briscoe and Stewart–Haas Racing's 14 car for the 2023 YellaWood 500.

== Awards ==
Old Spice has accumulated 37 awards as of 2016 at the Cannes Lions International Festival of Creativity. The brand was awarded two Gold Cannes Lions for Creative Effectiveness for "The Man Your Man Could Smell Like" in 2011 and "Smellcome to Manhood" in 2016. The former also won the Primetime Creative Arts Emmy Award for Outstanding Commercial in 2010.

== See also ==
- List of perfumes
- The 100 Greatest TV Ads
