= Slime (film) =

- Directed by: Jeron Braxton
- Written by: Brian Ash
- Produced by: Alex Lebovici; Scott Mescudi; Karina Manashil; Willow Smith; Aaron Bergman
- Starring: Scott Mescudi; Willow Smith; Teyana Taylor; Anna Sawai; John Cho; John Boyega; Winston Duke; LaKeith Stanfield
- Music by: Kid Cudi
- Production companies: Hammerstone Studios; Script 2 Screen; Mad Solar; Capstone Pictures
- Country: United States
- Language: English

Slime is an upcoming American animated action adventure science fiction film directed by Jeron Braxton and written by Brian Ash. It stars Willow Smith, Scott "Kid Cudi" Mescudi, Teyana Taylor, Anna Sawai, John Cho, John Boyega, Winston Duke, and LaKeith Stanfield.

== Plot ==
Set in a nearby dystopian future, the film follows Muna, a broke young woman who gets injected with slime during an experimental clinical trial. As the slime awakens uncontrollable powers and mysterious visions, she kidnaps Glenn, the lab worker who injected her, and the two seek out a cure.

== Voice cast ==
- Scott Mescudi as Glenn
- Willow Smith as Muna
- Teyana Taylor
- Anna Sawai
- John Cho
- John Boyega
- Winston Duke
- LaKeith Stanfield

== Production ==
In December 2023, it was announced that Scott Mescudi—better known as the musician Kid Cudi—was set to star in and produce a new animated film titled Slime, following his previous animated project Entergalactic (2022). Slime is to be directed by Jeron Braxton in his directorial debut and written by Brian Ash, who also executive produces. It was described as a "mash up of classic monster movies and fashion-forward video game aesthetics" and "wickedly satirical, scary as hell and trippy AF". In September 2025, Willow Smith, Teyana Taylor, Anna Sawai, John Cho, and John Boyega joined the voice cast, with Smith also serving as a producer. In November, Winston Duke and LaKeith Stanfield joined the cast, with voice recording beginning that month.
