= Tom Poole (colorist) =

English colorist

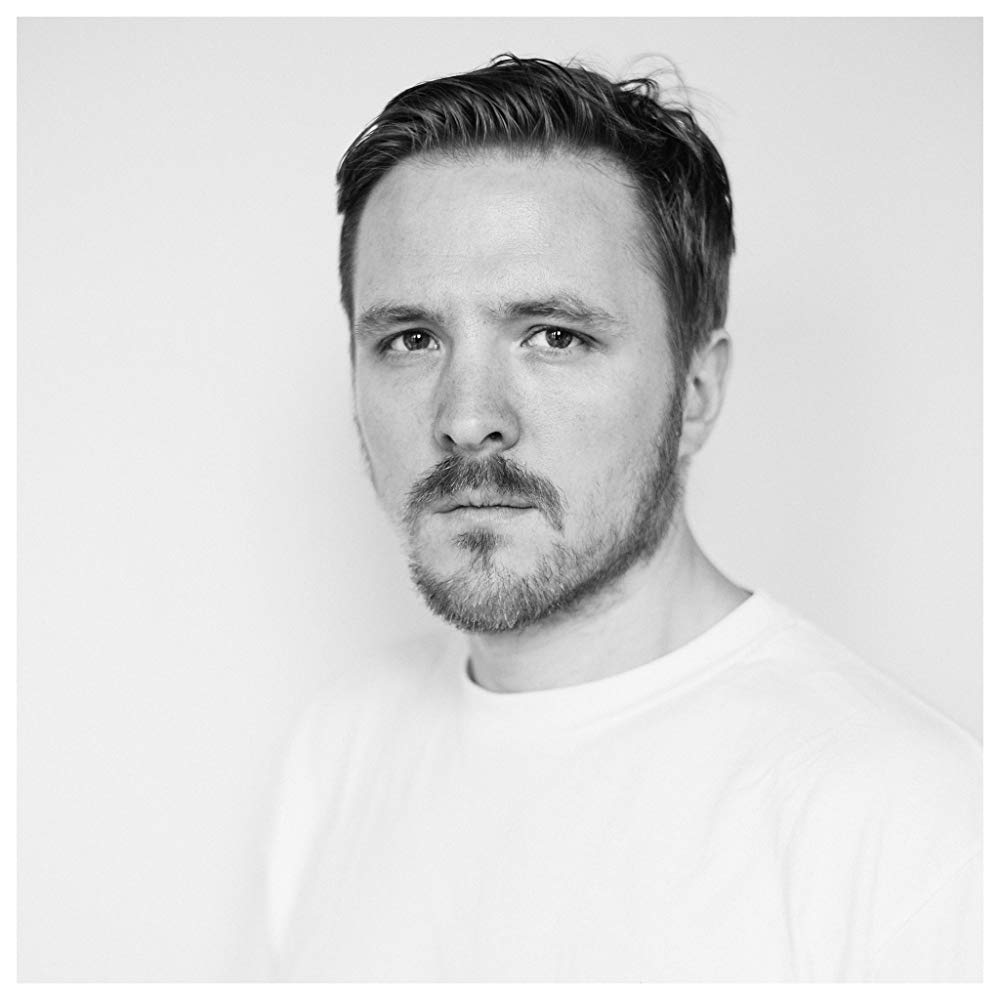
Tom Poole

Tom Poole is the Chief Creative Officer and Senior Colorist at Company 3. He was born in London, England, where he began his career, before moving to the States in 2004. He joined Company 3 in 2007.

== Career ==
In 2013, 2015 and 2016 he won a Hollywood Post Alliance (HPA) award for Outstanding Color Grading. Poole was recognized with two 2019 AICP awards for ‘Best Commercial Color Grading Over :90’ on National Lottery ‘Amazing Starts Here’ and ‘Best Music Video Color Grading’ for The Carters ‘Apes**t’. In 2017 Poole won the AICP ‘Best Commercial Color Grading Over :90’ award for Squarespace ‘John's Journey’ and in 2016 the ‘Best Color Grading’ award for the Adidas ‘Future’ campaign.

In 2017 Poole was accepted into The Academy Of Motion Picture Arts & Sciences.

== Selected filmography ==
=== Feature films ===
Year	Title	Director(s)	Cinematographer(s)	Editor(s)	Roles	Other notes
2011	Drive	Nicolas Winding Refn	Newton Thomas Sigel	Matthew Newman	Senior Colorist	Color Assistant: Andrew Geary
2012	The Grey	Joe Carnahan	Masanobu Takayanagi	Roger Barton & Jason Hellmann Additional Editor: Joseph Jett Sally	Senior Colorist	Color Assistant: Andrew Geary
2012	Compliance	Craig Zobel	Adam Stone	Jane Rizzo	Senior Colorist	Color Assistant: Andrew Geary
2012	The Place Beyond the Pines	Derek Cianfrance	Sean Bobbitt	Jim Helton & Ron Patane	Senior Colorist	Color Assistant: Andrew Geary
2013	Kill Your Darlings	John Krokidas	Reed Morano	Brian A. Kikes	Supervising Colorist	Additional Colorist: Andrew Geary
2013	Magic Magic	Sebastián Silva	Christopher Doyle & Glenn Kaplan	Jacob Craycroft & Álex Rodríguez	Supervising Colorist	Additional Colorist: Andrew Geary
2013	12 Years a Slave	Steve McQueen	Sean Bobbitt	Joe Walker	Digital Intermediate Colorist	
2013	Oldboy	Spike Lee	Sean Bobbitt	Barry Alexander Brown Additional Editor: Paul Hirsch	Colorist	Color Assistant: Giovanni DiGiorgio Head of Production: Nick Monton
2013	Out of the Furnace	Scott Cooper	Masanobu Takayanagi	David Rosenbloom	Colorist	
2014	The Skeleton Twins	Craig Johnson	Reed Morano	Jennifer Lee	Supervising Colorist	
2014	Non-Stop	Jaume Collet-Serra	Flavio Martínez Labiano	Jim May	Senior Colorist	
2014	Foxcatcher	Bennett Miller	Greig Fraser	Stuart Levy, Conor O'Neill & Jay Cassidy	Senior Colorist	
2014	Lullaby	Andrew Levitas	Florian Ballhaus	Julie Monroe	Senior Colorist	
2014	Let's Be Cops	Luke Greenfield	Daryn Okada	Bill Pankow & Jonathan Schwartz	Digital Intermediate Colorist	Digital Intermediate Producers: Nick Monton, Colin Davis Dailies Colorist: John Petersen
2014	Rosewater	Jon Stewart	Bobby Bukowski	Jay Rabinowitz	Colorist	
2014	The Longest Week	Peter Glanz	Ben Kutchins	Sarah Flack	Supervising Colorist	
2014	Love & Mercy	Bill Pohlad	Robert Yeoman	Dino Jonsäter	Senior Colorist	
2014	The Cobbler	Tom McCarthy	W. Mott Hupfel III	Tom McArdle	Senior Colorist	
2014	Kill the Messenger	Michael Cuesta	Sean Bobbitt	Brian A. Kates	Senior Colorist	
2015	True Story	Rupert Goold	Masanobu Takayanagi	Christopher Tellefsen & Nicolas de Toth	Senior Colorist	
2015	The Diary of a Teenage Girl	Marielle Heller	Brandon Trost	Marie-Hélène Dozo & Koen Timmerman	Senior Colorist	
2015	Run All Night	Jaume Collet-Serra	Martin Ruhe	Dirk Westervelt	Senior Colorist	
2015	Spotlight	Tom McCarthy	Masanobu Takayanagi	Tom McArdle	Senior Colorist	
2015	Black Mass	Scott Cooper	Masanobu Takayanagi	David Rosenbloom	Senior Colorist	
2015	Meadowland	Reed Morano		Madeleine Gavin	Senior Colorist	
2015	Rock the Kasbah	Barry Levinson	Sean Bobbitt	Aaron Yanes	Senior Colorist	
2016	The Light Between Oceans	Derek Cianfrance	Adam Arkapaw	Jim Helton & Ron Patane	Supervising Colorist	
2016	Queen of Katwe	Mira Nair	Sean Bobbitt	Barry Alexander Brown	Supervising Colorist	
2016	Keeping Up with the Joneses	Greg Mottola	Andrew Dunn	David Rennie	Supervising Colorist	Colorist: Andrew Geary Color Assistants: Giovanni DiGiorgio, Nicholas Figueroa, Josh Spector, Ewelina Nietupska
2016	Assassin's Creed	Justin Kurzel	Adam Arkapaw	Christopher Tellefsen	Digital Intermediate Colorist	Additional Color: Greg Fisher Color Assistants: Lucie Barbier, Jonas Jangvad, Chris Francis
2017	Hostiles	Scott Cooper	Masanobu Takayanagi	Tom Cross	senior colorist	
2017	On Chesil Beach	Dominic Cooke	Sean Bobbitt	Nick Fenton	senior colorist	
2017	Stronger	David Gordon Green	Sean Bobbitt	Dylan Tichenor	senior colorist	
2017	I, Tonya	Craig Gillespie	Nicolas Karakatsanis	Tatiana S. Riegel	Senior Colorist	
2018	12 Strong	Nicolai Fuglsig	Rasmus Videbæk	Lisa Lassek	Colorist	
2018	I Think We're Alone Now	Reed Morano		Madeleine Gavin	senior colorist	
2018	Galveston	Mélanie Laurent	Arnaud Potier	Joseph Krings	colorist	
2018	BlacKkKlansman	Spike Lee	Chayse Irvin	Barry Alexander Brown	Colorist	
2018	Cam	Daniel Goldhaber	Katelin Arizmendi	Daniel Garber	Supervising Colorist	
2018	White Boy Rick	Yann Demange	Tat Radcliffe	Chris Wyatt	Colorist	Color Assistants: Josh Spector, Jake White Dailies Colorist: Adrian Delude
2018	Widows	Steve McQueen	Sean Bobbitt	Joe Walker	Colorist	
2018	Halloween	David Gordon Green	Michael Simmonds	Tim Alverson	Colorist	
2018	The Nutcracker and the Four Realms	Lasse Hallström & Joe Johnston	Linus Sandgren	Stuart Levy	Colorist	
2018	Escape at Dannemora	Ben Stiller	Jessica Lee Gagné	Geoffrey Richman & Matthew Jamieson	supervising colorist	
2019	Euphoria	Sam Levinson, Augustine Frizzell, Jennifer Morrison & Pippa Bianco	Marcell Rév, André Chemetoff, Drew Daniels, Adam Newport-Berra & Rina Yang	Julio C. Perez IV, Laura Zempel, Harry Yoon, Aaron I. Butler & Darrin Navarro	final & supervising colorist	Airing since 2019
2019	The King	David Michôd	Adam Arkapaw	Peter Sciberras	senior supervising colorist	
2019	Queen & Slim	Melina Matsoukas	Tat Radcliffe	Pete Beaudreau	senior colorist	
2019	21 Bridges	Brian Kirk	Paul Cameron	Tim Murrell	senior colorist	
2020	The Courier	Dominic Cooke	Sean Bobbitt	Tariq Anwar & Gareth C. Scales	colorist: Company 3	
2020	Timmy Failure: Mistakes Were Made	Tom McCarthy	Masanobu Takayanagi	Tom McArdle	senior finishing colorist	
2020	The Rhythm Section	Reed Morano	Sean Bobbitt	Joan Sobel	senior finishing colorist	
2020	The Invisible Man	Leigh Whannell	Stefan Duscio	Andy Canny	senior finishing colorist	
2020	Bad Education	Cory Finley	Lyle Vincent	Louise Ford	senior colorist	Color Assist: Jake White
2020	Human Capital	Marc Meyers	Kat Westergaard	Tariq Anwar & Alex Hall	supervising colorist	
2020	Project Power	Henry Joost & Ariel Schulman	Michael Simmonds	Jeff McEvoy	Colorist	Head of Production: Margaret Lewis Color Assistant: Jake White
2020	Jungleland	Max Winkler	Damian Garcia	Tomas Vengris	Supervising Colorist	
2020	Dreamland	Miles Joris-Peyrafitte	Lyle Vincent	Abbi Jutkowitz & Brett M. Reed	Digital Intermediate Colorist	
2021	Malcolm & Marie	Sam Levinson	Marcell Rév	Julio C. Perez IV	Company 3 Colorist	Company 3 Color Assistant: Jake White FotoKem NextLAB Dailies Colorist: Dan Garsha
2021	Judas and the Black Messiah	Shaka King	Sean Bobbitt	Kristan Sprague & Jennifer Lame	Digital Intermediate Colorist	Digital Intermediate Conform Artist: John Diesso Digital Intermediate Producer: Margaret Lewis
2021	Monster	Anthony Mandler	David Devlin	Joe Klotz	Supervising Colorist	
2021	Cruella	Craig Gillespie	Nicolas Karakatsanis	Tatiana S. Riegel	Colorist	Color Assists: John Tripp (LA), Melina Smith (NY) Image Scientist: John Quartel
2021	Stillwater	Tom McCarthy	Masanobu Takayanagi	Tom McArdle	Digital Intermediate Senior Colorist	
2021	Kate	Cedric Nicolas-Troyan	Lyle Vincent	Sandra Montiel & Elísabet Ronaldsdóttir	Senior Colorist	
2021	Blue Bayou	Justin Chon	Matthew Chuang, Ante Cheng	Reynolds Barney	Colorist	Color Assistants: Jake White, Nick Nassif Image Scientist: John Quartel
2021	Dear Evan Hansen	Stephen Chbosky	Brandon Trost	Anne McCabe	Supervising Colorist	Colorist: Andrew Geary
2021	Halloween Kills	David Gordon Green	Michael Simmonds	Tim Alverson	Colorist	Color Assistant: Jake White
2021	Antlers	Scott Cooper	Florian Hoffmeister	Dylan Tichenor	Finishing Colorist	
2021	Swan Song	Benjamin Cleary	Masanobu Takayanagi	Nathan Nugent	Digital Intermediate Senior Colorist	
2022	The Survivor	Barry Levinson	George Steel	Douglas Crise	Supervising Colorist	Finishing Colorist: Jenny Montgomery Color Assistant: Jake White
2022	Blonde	Andrew Dominik	Chayse Irvin	Adam Robinson & Jennifer Lame	Finishing Colorist (with Andrew Geary & Jake White)	Color Assistant: Ben White
2022	Black Panther: Wakanda Forever	Ryan Coogler	Autumn Durald Arkapaw	Michael P. Shawver, Kelley Dixon & Jennifer Lame	Supervising Finishing Artist	Creative Finishing Supervisor: Evan Jacobs Finishing Artists: Adam Nazarenko (2D), Jared Pecht (3D), Alan Louis Gordon (3D)
2022	The Menu	Mark Mylod	Peter Deming	Christopher Tellefsen	Finishing Colorist	Lead Color Assistant: Melina Smith Data Manager: Stacey Lee
2022	The Pale Blue Eye	Scott Cooper	Masanobu Takayanagi	Dylan Tichenor	Supervising Colorist	Colorist: Dustin Wadsworth Dailies Colorist/Operator: Greg Lomasney

=== 2023 ===
Title	Director(s)	Cinematographer(s)	Editor(s)	Roles	Other notes
Jamojaya	Justin Chon	Ante Cheng	Reynolds Barney	Colorist	Company 3 Producer: Zac Gobetz Company 3 Head of Production: Mike Maida
Landscape with Invisible Hand	Cory Finley	Lyle Vincent	Louise Ford	Finishing Colorist	Dailies Colorist: Marc Lulkin Color Assistant: Emily Bailey
Past Lives	Celine Song	Shabier Kirchner	Keith Fraase Additional Editor: Shannon Fitzpatrick	Finishing Colorist	Color Assistants: Andrew Mirnamesh, Mena Smith Finishing Producer: Zac Gobetz
Shotgun Wedding	Jason Moore	Peter Deming	Doc Crotzer	Colorist	Additional Color: Jenny Montgomery Color Assistants: Mena Smith, Jake White
If You Were the Last	Kristian Mercado	Alex Disenhof	Henry Hayes	Supervising Finishing Colorist	Finishing Colorist: Dustin Wadsworth Color Assistants: Mena Smith, Andrew Mirmanesh
Dreamin' Wild	Bill Pohlad	Arnaud Potier	Annette Davey	Colorist	Dailies Colorist (AP): Gabriel McIntyre Head of Production: Michael Maeda
The Good Mother	Miles Joris-Peyrafitte	Charlotte Hornsby	Taylor Levy, Damian Rodriguez	Supervising Colorist	Colorist: Dustin Wadsworth
Dumb Money	Craig Gillespie	Nikolas Karakatsanis	Kirk Baxter Additional Editor: Rex Lowry	Finishing Colorist Additional Color: Dustin Wadsworth	Color Assistant: Melina Smith Dailies Colorist (LA): Tom Klane
Fingernails	Christos Nikou	Marcell Rév	Yorgos Zafeiris	Colorist	Additional Colorist: Dustin Wadsworth Dailies Colorist: Kelly Milligan
The Marvels	Nia DaCosta	Sean Bobbitt	Evan Schiff, Catrin Hedström	Supervising Finishing Artist	Creative Finishing Supervisor: Evan Jacobs Finishing Artists: Adam Nazarenko (2D), Jared Pecht (3D), Alan Louis Gordon (3D)
Leave the World Behind	Sam Esmail	Tod Campbell	Lisa Lassek	Finishing Colorist Additional Color: Dustin Wadsworth	Color Assistant: Mena Smith Head of Dailies: Andrew Dearnley

=== 2024 ===
Title	Director(s)	Cinematographer(s)	Editor(s)	Roles	Other notes
Origin	Ava DuVernay	Matthew J. Lloyd	Spencer Averick	Colorist Additional Colorist: Matt Osborne	Color Assistant: Jason Maydick Dailies Colorist: Karli Windischmann
The Greatest Hits	Ned Benson	Chung Chung-hoon	Saira Haider	Colorist Additional Colorist: Matt Osborne	Color Assistant: Frankie Hudson Dailies Colorist: Tom Klane
A Quiet Place: Day One	Michael Sarnoski	Pat Scola	Andrew Mondshein, Gregory Plotkin	Supervising Colorist	Finishing / Dailies Colorist: Jake M. White Color Assistant: Frankie Hudson
Beverly Hills Cop: Axel F	Mark Molloy	Eduard Grau	Dan Lebental Additional Editor: Asaf Eisenberg	Supervising Colorist Colorist: Dustin Wadsworth	Color Assistant: Frankie Hudson Dailies Colorists: Jack Tashdjian, Tom Klane
MaXXXine	Ti West	Eliot Rockett	Ti West	Finishing Colorist Additional Colorist: Dustin Wadsworth	Color Assistant: Frankie Hudson Dailies Colorist: Jack Tashdjian
Rez Ball	Sydney Freeland	Kira Kelly	Jessica Baclesse Additional Editor: Elliott Traeger	Finishing Colorist	Dailies Colorist/Additional Colorist: Jake M. White
Blitz	Steve McQueen	Yorick Le Saux	Peter Sciberras	Colorist	Additional Colorist: Dustin Wadsworth
Carry-On	Jaume Collet-Serra	Lyle Vincent	Elliot Greenberg, Krisztian Majdik, Fred Raskin	Colorist	Additional Colorist: Dustin Wadsworth

=== 2025 ===
Title	Director(s)	Cinematographer(s)	Editor(s)	Roles	Other notes
Magazine Dreams	Elijah Bynum	Adam Arkapaw	Jon Otazua	Colorist	Finishing Editor: Gina Kalim Company 3 Producer: Kate Albers
Thunderbolts*	Jake Schreier	Andrew Droz Palermo	Angela M. Catanzaro, Harry Yoon	Supervising Finishing Artist Creative Finishing Supervisor: Evan Jacobs	Finishing Artist: Adam Nazarenko 3D Finishing Artists: Jared Pecht, Joel McWilliams
The Fantastic Four: First Steps	Matt Shakman	Jess Hall	Nona Khodai, Tim Roche Additional Editor: Terel Gibson	Supervising Finishing Artist Creative Finishing Supervisor: Evan Jacobs	Finishing Artist: Adam Nazarenko 3D Finishing Artists: Jared Pecht, Nick Nassif
The Toxic Avenger	Macon Blair	Dana Gonzales	Brett W. Bachman, James Thomas	Colorist	
Eleanor the Great	Scarlett Johansson	Hélène Louvart	Harry Jierjian	Colorist Additional Colorist: Jake M. White	Digital Intermediate Color Assists: Frankie Hudson, Marlagne Piard Dailies Colorist: Alex Kaufman
Springsteen: Deliver Me From Nowhere	Scott Cooper	Masanobu Takayanagi	Pamela Martin	Colorist	
Hedda	Nia DaCosta	Sean Bobbitt	Jacob Secher Schulsinger	Supervising Colorist	Additional Colorist: Dustin Wadsworth

=== 2026 ===
Title	Director(s)	Cinematographer(s)	Editor(s)	Roles	Other notes
28 Years Later: The Bone Temple	Nia DaCosta	Sean Bobbitt	Jake Roberts	Colourist Additional Colorist: Dustin Wadsworth	Lead Colour Assistant: Shing Hong Chan Colour Assistants: Alex Coveney, Emma Hockley, Christopher Jamieson-Green, Joss Hardman, Jonas Jangvad, Hugh Howlett, Conor Middleton
Supergirl	Craig Gillespie	Rob Hardy	Tatiana S. Riegel, Fred Raskin	Supervising Finishing Artist	Finishing Artist: Adam Nazarenko Senior Color Assistant: Frankie Hudson
Spider-Man: Brand New Day	Destin Daniel Cretton	Brett Pawlak	Nat Sanders, Gina Sansom, Harry Yoon	Supervising Finishing Artist Creative Finishing Supervisor: Evan Jacobs	Finishing Artist: Adam Nazarenko 3D Finishing Artists: Jared Pecht, Nick Nassif
Ebenezer†	Ti West	Checco Varese	TBA	Colorist Dailies Colorist: Doychin Margoevski	Senior Color Assistant: Frankie Hudson
Avengers: Doomsday†	Anthony and Joe Russo	Newton Thomas Sigel	Jeffrey Ford	Supervising Finishing Artist Creative Finishing Supervisor: Evan Jacobs	Finishing Artist: Adam Nazarenko 3D Finishing Artists: Jared Pecht, Nick Nassif

Key
†	Denotes projects that have not yet been released

=== Television ===
Year	Title	Showrunner(s)	Director(s)	Cinematographer(s)	Editor(s)	Roles	Other notes
2019	The Righteous Gemstones	Danny McBride	Danny McBride, David Gordon Green, Jody Hill	Brandon Trost, Michael Simmonds	Justin Bourret, Todd Zelin, Craig Hayes & Sam Seig	Supervising Colorist	Colorist: Andrew Geary
2020	I Know This Much Is True	Derek Cianfrance, Anya Epstein	Derek Cianfrance	Jody Lee Lipes	Ron Patane, Jim Helton, Malcolm Jamieson, Dean Palisch & Nico Leunen	Senior Colorist	
2020	Small Axe	Steve McQueen		Shabier Kirchner	Chris Dickens, Steve McQueen	Senior Colorist	
2021	Physical	Annie Weisman	Craig Gillespie, Liza Johnson, Stephanie Laing	Paula Huidobro	Sophie Corra	Supervising Colorist	Colorist: J. Cody Baker Dailies Colorist: Tom Klane
2022	Euphoria	Sam Levinson		Marcell Rev	Julio Perez	Final Colorist	Season 2 Colorist: Jake White
2022	Pam & Tommy	Robert Siegel	Craig Gillespie, Lake Bell, Gwyneth Horder-Payton & Hannah Fidell	Paula Huidobro	Tatiana S. Riegel, Annette Davey, Michael Giambra & Eric Kissack	DI Supervising Colorist	DI Colorist: J. Cody Baker Dailies Colorist: John St. Laurent
2022	Severance	Dan Erickson	Ben Stiller & Aoife McArdle	Jessica Lee Gagné & Matt Mitchell	Geoffrey Richman, Gershon Hinkson & Erica Freed Marker	Supervising Colorist	Colorist: Andrew Geary Additional Colorist: Ben White
2022	Pachinko	Soo Hugh	Kogonada & Justin Chon	Florian Hoffmeister & Ante Cheng	Simon Brasse, Joe Hobeck, Erica Freed Marker, Susan E. Kim, Jacob Craycroft & Sabine Hoffman	Supervising Colorist	Colorist: Andrew Geary Company 3 Color Producer: Zachary Gobetz
2023	Miley Cyrus - Endless Summer Vacation (Backyard Sessions)	Jacob Bixenman, Brendan Walter		Marcell Rév	Brendan Walter Online Editor: Nicholas McGregor	Supervising Colorist	Colorist: Dustin Wadsworth Dailies Colorist: Jon Rocke
2023	The Idol	Abel Tesfaye, Reza Fahim, Sam Levinson	Sam Levinson	Marcell Rév, Drew Daniels, Julie Cohen, Arseni Khachaturan	Julio C. Perez IV, Aaron Butler, Aleshka Ferrero	Supervising Colorist	Colorist: Dustin Wadsworth
2023	The Changeling	Kelly Marcel	Melina Matsoukas, Jonathan van Tulleken, Dana Gonzales, Michael Francis Williams, Solvan "Slick" Naim	Marcell Rév, Christopher Norr, Steve Cosen	Geoff Ashenhurst, Jonathan Eagan, Hye Na	Colorist (with Bill Ferwerda)	Additional Colorist: Ian Passy
2024	American Rust Season 2: Broken Justice	Dan Futterman	Jim McKay, Michael Lehmann, Radium Cheung, Melissa Hickey	Justin Foster	Tamar Bihari	Supervising Colorist	
2024	The Sympathizer	Park Chan-wook, Don McKellar	Park Chan-wook, Fernando Meirelles, Marc Munden	Ji Yong Kim	TBA	Colorist (with Matt Osborne)	Finishing Artist: Mike Delegal Dailies Colorist: John St. Laurent

=== 2025 ===
Title	Showrunner(s)	Director(s)	Cinematographer(s)	Editor(s)	Roles	Other notes
The White Lotus: Season Three	Mike White		Ben Kutchins	John M. Valerio, Scott Turner	Colorist	Additional Colorist: Dustin Wadsworth
Severance: Season 2	Dan Erickson	Ben Stiller, Sam Donovan, Uta Briesewitz, Jessica Lee Gagné	Jessica Lee Gagné, David Lanzenberg, Suzie Lavelle	Geoffrey Richman, Joe Landauer, Keith Fraase	Supervising Colorist Colorist: Dustin Wadsworth	Color Assists: Frankie Hudson, Melina Smith Dailies Colorist: Alex Kaufman

=== Music videos ===
Year	Title	Artist(s)/Group(s)	Director(s)	Cinematographer(s)	Editor(s)	Roles	Other notes
2022	Lux Æterna	Metallica	Timothy Saccenti	Joshua Zucker-Pluda	Matt Posey	Colorist	
2022	Lift Me Up	Rihanna	Autumn Durald Arkapaw		Andrew Heagle	Colorist	Color Producer: Behnood Behjoo Color Assist: Frankie Hudson
2023	Flowers	Miley Cyrus	Jacob Bixenman	Marcell Rév	Brendan Walter	Colorist	
2023	River	Miley Cyrus	Jacob Bixenman	Adam Newport-Berra	Brendan Walter	Colorist	Company 3 Producer: Shannen Troup
2023	Where She Goes	Bad Bunny	Stillz	Marcell Rév	Aitor Bigas	Colorist	Shot on 35mm and 16mm Kodak Vision3 200T, 500T and Ektachrome film
2023	Used to Be Young	Miley Cyrus	Jacob Bixenman, Brendan Walter	Marcell Rév	Brendan Walter	Colorist	Company 3 Producer: Shannen Troup
2023	Un Preview	Bad Bunny	Stillz	Marcell Rév	Aitor Bigas	Colorist	
2023	Baticano	Bad Bunny	Stillz	Marcell Rév	Aitor Bigas	Colorist	Company 3 Producer: Shannen Troup

=== Commercials ===
Year	Title	Director(s)	Cinematographer(s)	Editor(s)	Roles	Other notes
2022	Michelob ULTRA: Welcome to Superior Bowl	Rachel Morrison		Tommy Harden	Colorist	Shot on Kodak 35 mm film with Arricam and Arriflex 435 cameras
2022	David Yurman: Come Closer	Nathan Copan	Max Goldman	William Town	Colorist	Color finishing completed at Modern Post Shot on Sony CineAlta Venice cameras with Panavision Sphero 65 lenses
2023	Michelob ULTRA: New Members Day	Rachel Morrison		Eric Alexander-Hughes, Tommy Harden	Colorist (with Jenny Montgomery)	Company 3 Producers: Shannen Troup, Nick Kraznic Shot on Kodak 35 mm film
2023	Rakuten: Not-So Clueless	Will Speck and Josh Gordon	Bill Pope	Graham Turner	Colorist	Company 3 Producer: Shannen Troup
2023	TurboTax: Dancer	Fiona McGee	Ross Giardana	Eric Hill, Steve Sprinkel	Colorist	Company 3 Producer: Shannen Troup
2023	NBA: Little Black Book	Karim Huu Do	Rina Yang	TBA	Colorist	Company 3 Producer: Shannen Troup Visual Effects by Framestore
2023	Blizzard Entertainment: Art of Choice	Henry Hobson	TBA	Stew Reeves	Colorist	Flame Lead: Wensen Ho Finishing Producers: Shannen Troup, Alex Park Hooper
2023	Metallica: 72 Seasons	Tim Saccenti	Joshua Zucker-Pluda	Tyler Hurst	Colorist	Finishing Producer: Shannen Troup
2023	Sydney Sweeney x Ford Bronco	Lucy Sandler	Evan Prosofsky	Matt Burke	Colorist	Finishing Producer: Shannen Troup
2023	Gucci: The Gift	Sabato De Sarno (Creative), Riccardo (Artistic)	Marcell Rév	TBA	Colorist	Finishing Producer: Shannen Troup
2023	Ritz: The Ritzcracker	Camila Zapiola	Leandro Filloy	TBA	Colorist	Finishing Producer: Shannen Troup Visual Effects by Framestore
2023	Apple Inc.: Mother Nature	TBA	TBA	TBA	Colorist	
2024	BMW: Talkin Like Walken	Bryan Buckley	Hoyte van Hoytema	Chan Hatcher	Senior Colorist	Color Producer: Shannen Troup
2024	Uber Eats: Don't Forget Uber Eats	Jake Szymanski	Larkin Seiple	Kirk Baxter, Matt Murphy, Zaldy Lopez, Danielle Sclafani, Cole Grom	Senior Colorist (with Matt Osborne)	Color Producer: Shannen Troup
2024	Hellmann's: Mayo Cat	Will Speck and Josh Gordon	Darren Lew	Pamela Petruski, Danielle Minch	Senior Colorist (with Jenny Montgomery)	Color Producer: Shannen Troup Visual Effects by Framestore
2024	FanDuel: Gronk Misses the FanDuel Kick of Destiny 2	Mike Warzin	Autumn Durald Arkapaw	Grant Surmi	Senior Colorist	Color Producer: Shannen Troup
2025	Glad: I Love Trash	Will Speck and Josh Gordon	Jess Hall	Graham Turner	Colorist	Color Producer: Nick Kraz Visual Effects by Framestore
