= Theresa Kang =

American businesswoman

Theresa Kang Lowe
- Occupations: Owner, Blue Marble Productions
- Known for: Pachinko series
- Spouse: Jonathon Lowe m.2015-2021
- Children: Two

Theresa Kang is an American businesswoman. She is the CEO of Blue Marble Pictures and Blue Marble Productions, based in Los Angeles.

== Early life and education ==
Kang is of Korean descent. She went to UCLA, where she minored in sociology.

== Career ==
Kang started in the mailroom and then became an assistant at Endeavor in 2003. Over the course of her tenure, she worked in the television and motion picture departments, as assistant various points to Endeavor partners Ari Emmanuel, Ari Greenburg, Christopher Donnelly, and Paul Haas. In 2007, Kang was promoted to agent in the television literary department at Endeavor.

At WME, Kang was one of the first Asian American women to be promoted to partner in 2014. In 2012, Kang was one of The Hollywood Reporter Next Generation List as an agent and in 2021, The Hollywood Reporter's Annual(ish) Women in Entertainment Power 100. In addition to representing talent, Kang developed the internal initiative Empower with WME colleague Phil Sun, designed to mentor assistants within WME.

In 2019, Kang was one of three business people selected by Mayor Eric Garcetti to be in the Los Angeles Entrepreneurs in Residence for the Evolve Entertainment Fund, whose mission is to increase diversity focused initiatives in the entertainment industryi. That same year, Kang was also named in the annual 100 Most Influential Asian Americans and Pacific Islanders in American Culture by Gold House.

After 17 years as an agent, Kang told KCRW that she asked herself if she was doing what she needed to do. She realized she wanted to tell stories, but not as an agent anymore, but be involved in the creative process. Kang left WME to launch Blue Marble Pictures in 2020. The name of the company was inspired by a photo of earth taken by the crew of Apollo 17 in the 1970s.

Her first project was as executive producer of the series, Pachinko. She had read the novel when she was an agent in 2017, and wanted to turn it into a series, sending it to several Asian American screenwriters who passed. She sent it to Soo Hugh, who was her client, who signed on. Kang told Glamour Magazine , "Our series was adapted by a Korean American woman, from a novel by a Korean American author. Of the 637 cast members, approximately 95% are Asian. That feels staggering to say." They won a Peabody Award and an Independent Spirit Award for Best Ensemble.

== Personal ==
Kang also uses Theresa Kang-Lowe.

Kang is an advocate for under represented voices and diversity in Hollywood. She is a member of Korean American Leaders in Hollywood.
