= Pachinko (disambiguation) =

Pachinko is a mechanical game originating in Japan that is used as an arcade game.

Pachinko may also refer to:

- Pachinko (novel), novel by Min Jin Lee
- Pachinko (TV series), TV series based on the novel
