= Soo Hugh =

American television writer and producer

- Born: South Korea
- Occupations: Producer, screenwriter
- Years active: 2004–present
- Agent: WME

Korean name
- Hangul: 허수진
- RR: Heo Sujin
- MR: Hŏ Sujin

Soo Hugh (Korean: 허수진) is a New York based American television writer, producer, and showrunner. She served as co-showrunner for the first season of AMC's The Terror and is currently showrunner for Apple TV+'s Pachinko, an adaptation of Min Jin Lee's bestselling novel.

== Career ==
Before working as a TV writer, Hugh worked in marketing and advertising. Her credits as a staff writer include AMC’s The Killing, CBS’ Under the Dome, and Apple TV+’s See. Her first series as creator/showrunner was The Whispers for ABC, which premiered in 2015. The Whispers is based on a Ray Bradbury short story and was produced by Steven Spielberg and directed by Mark Romanek.

Soo Hugh was the co-showrunner alongside show developer David Kajganich of the first season of AMC's The Terror (2018). The series was produced by Ridley Scott and is based on the Dan Simmons novel of the same name.

Hugh is currently the showrunner and executive producer of Apple TV+ series Pachinko, which premiered March 25, 2022. The series is based on the novel by Min Jin Lee, and tells the story of multiple generations of a Korean family, taking place across the US, Japan, and Korea. Kogonada and Justin Chon direct four episodes each, and also executive produce. The cast includes Youn Yuh-Jung, Jin Ha, Lee Minho, Kaho Minami, Kim Min-ha, Anna Sawai, and Jimmi Simpson. On April 29, 2022, Apple renewed the series for a second season.

She signed a multi-year overall deal with Universal Content Productions in 2021. In early 2022, she launched the Thousand Miles Project through UCP. The Thousand Miles Project is an incubator program for aspiring writers telling AAPI stories, and includes an educational workshop as well as a development lab.

Hugh is set to produce an adaptation of Wisconsin Death Trip for Media Res, and a film for Amazon to be written by Lynn Nottage and Tony Gerber. She is also writing the reboot of Flight of the Navigator for Disney.

== Awards and honours ==
- 2022: Peabody Award for her work as a creator of the show Pachinko.
