= Ante Cheng =

American cinematographer

- Born: Taipei, Taiwan
- Education: University of Southern California
- Occupation: Cinematographer
- Years active: 2013–present

Ante Cheng is a Taiwanese-Canadian cinematographer, based in Los Angeles. He is best known for his work on Ms. Purple, Blue Bayou and Pachinko.

== Career ==
Ante received a Master of Fine Arts from the University of Southern California. He is a member of the International Cinematographers Guild (ICG). He collaborated with director Justin Chon on Gook, Ms. Purple, Blue Bayou and Pachinko. In 2021, he was listed as one of Variety's "10 Cinematographers to Watch".

== Selected filmography ==
As cinematographer

- 2026 - By Any Means
- 2025 - Preparation for the Next Life
- 2025 - Ironheart
- 2023 - Jamojaya
- 2022 - Darby and the Dead
- 2022 – Pachinko
- 2021 – Blue Bayou
- 2020 – Death of Nintendo
- 2019 – The Echo Worlds
- 2019 – Samir
- 2019 – Ms. Purple
- 2018 – Where Dreams Rest
- 2017 – Gook

== Awards and nominations ==
Year	Result	Award	Category	Work	Ref.
2022	Nominated	Primetime Emmy Awards	Outstanding Main Title Design	Pachinko	
2022	Nominated	Independent Spirit Awards	Best Cinematography	Blue Bayou	
2021	Won	Young Critics Circle	Best Achievement in Cinematography and Visual Design	Death of Nintendo	
2019	Won	Los Angeles Asian Pacific Film Festival	Best Cinematography	Ms. Purple	
