= Ruby Fruit =

- Directed by: Takumi Kimizuka
- Produced by: Hisao Nabeshima
- Starring: Kaho Minami
- Cinematography: Motoyoshi Hasegawa
- Edited by: Yoshinori Ota
- Music by: Yuki Kajiura
- Distributed by: Toei Company
- Release date: 21 January 1995
- Running time: 96 minutes
- Country: Japan
- Language: Japanese

Ruby Fruit (ルビーフルーツ) is a 1995 Japanese film directed by Takumi Kimizuka based on the 1992 novel by Ayako Saito.

== Cast ==
- Kaho Minami as Matsunaga Maiko
- Tsugumi Arimura as Sirani(Yaoyo Takahashi)
- Jun Togawa as Yoshimi
- Reiko Takashima as Kyoko
- Haruko Mabuchi as Sayuri
- Jinpachi Nezu as Hisao Kagami
