= Critics' Choice Television Award for Best Foreign Language Series =

Television award

- Awarded for: Best Foreign Language Series
- Country: United States
- Presented by: Critics Choice Association
- First award: 2022
- Currently held by: Squid Game (2026)
- Website: criticschoice.com

The Critics' Choice Television Award for Best Foreign Language Series is one of the award categories presented annually by the Critics Choice Association. It was first introduced at the 27th Critics' Choice Awards in 2022.

== Winners and nominees ==
=== 2020s ===
Year	Title	Network	Country
2022	Squid Game	Netflix	South Korea
2022	Acapulco	Apple TV+	United States
2022	Call My Agent!	Netflix	France
2022	Lupin	Netflix	France
2022	Money Heist	Netflix	Spain
2022	Narcos: Mexico	Netflix	United States
2023	Pachinko	Apple TV+	United States
2023	1899	Netflix	Germany
2023	Borgen	Netflix	Denmark
2023	Extraordinary Attorney Woo	Netflix	South Korea
2023	¡García!	HBO Max	Spain
2023	The Kingdom: Exodus	Mubi	Denmark
2023	Kleo	Netflix	Germany
2023	My Brilliant Friend	HBO	Italy / United States
2023	Tehran	Apple TV+	Israel
2024	Lupin	Netflix	France
2024	Bargain	Paramount+	South Korea
2024	The Glory	Netflix	South Korea
2024	The Good Mothers	Apple TV+	Italy / United Kingdom
2024	The Interpreter of Silence	Hulu	Germany / Poland
2024	Mask Girl	Netflix	South Korea
2024	Moving	Hulu	South Korea
2025	Squid Game	Netflix	South Korea
2025	Acapulco	Apple TV+	United States
2025	Citadel: Honey Bunny	Amazon Prime Video	India
2025	La Máquina	Hulu	Mexico / United States
2025	The Law According to Lidia Poët	Netflix	Italy
2025	My Brilliant Friend	HBO	Italy / United States
2025	Pachinko	Apple TV+	United States
2025	Senna	Netflix	Brazil
2026	Squid Game	Netflix	South Korea
2026	Acapulco	Apple TV+	United States
2026	Last Samurai Standing	Netflix	Japan
2026	Mussolini: Son of the Century	Mubi	France / Italy
2026	Red Alert	Paramount+	Israel
2026	When No One Sees Us	HBO Max	Spain

== Multiple wins ==
3 wins

- Squid Game (2 consecutive)

== Multiple nominations ==
3 nominations

- Acapulco
- Squid Game

2 nominations

- Lupin
- My Brilliant Friend
- Pachinko
