= Pachinko (novel) =

2017 novel by Min Jin Lee

- First edition
- Author: Min Jin Lee
- Cover artist: Brigid Pearson (cover design); Patrick Leger (cover image)
- Language: English
- Subject: Zainichi Koreans
- Publisher: Grand Central Publishing
- Publication date: February 7, 2017 (first edition); August 2026 (special trade paperback)
- Publication place: United States
- Media type: Print (hardback & paperback)
- Pages: 515
- ISBN: 9781538784037
- LC Class: 2016023353

Pachinko is the second novel by Harlem-based author and journalist Min Jin Lee. Published in 2017, Pachinko is an epic historical fiction novel following a Korean family who immigrates to Japan. The story features an ensemble of characters who encounter racism, discrimination, stereotyping, and other aspects of the 20th-century Korean experience of Japan.

Pachinko was a 2017 finalist for the National Book Award for Fiction. Apple's streaming service Apple TV+ produced a television adaptation of the novel, and it was released in March 2022.

== Plot ==
The novel is divided into three sections, which begin with quotations from the works of Charles Dickens, Park Wan-suh, and Benedict Anderson, respectively.

- Book I, Gohyang/Hometown, begins with the story of Sunja's father, Hoonie, and ends with Noa's birth.
- Book II, Motherland, begins with Baek Isak's incarceration and ends with Sunja's search of Koh Hansu.
- Book III, Pachinko, begins with Noa's new beginnings in Nagano and ends with Sunja's reflections upon everything that has happened to her.

=== Book I (1910–1933): Gohyang/Hometown ===
In 1883, in the little island fishing village of Yeongdo, which is a ferry ride from Busan, an aging fisherman and his wife take in lodgers to make a little more money. They have three sons, but only one, Hoonie, who has a cleft lip and club foot, survives to adulthood. Because of his deformities, Hoonie is considered ineligible for marriage. When he is 27, Japan annexes Korea, leaving many families destitute and without food. Due to their prudent habits, Hoonie's family's situation is comparatively more stable, and a matchmaker arranges a marriage between Hoonie and Yangjin, the daughter of a poor farmer who had lost everything in the colonial conquest. Hoonie and Yangjin take over the lodging house after Hoonie's parents died.

In the mid-1910s, Yangjin and Hoonie have a daughter named Sunja. After her thirteenth birthday, she is raised by her mother Yangjin, her father Hoonie having died from tuberculosis. At age sixteen, Sunja is pursued by a wealthy fishbroker, Koh Hansu. However, she shows little interest in him until he saves her from an attempted sexual assault by three teenagers on her way home from the market, leading her to start trusting him. From that point on, Hansu spends weeks secretly meeting with her and sharing his stories of Osaka with her, with Sunja learning Hansu is a Zainichi Korean; therefore, knowing fluent Japanese when threatening the teenagers. After weeks of meeting her, Hansu goes with Sunja into the forest and sexually assaults her. That day marks the beginning of an abusive affair, where Hansu repeatedly uses her for sex, while Sunja believes they are meant to be married. Sunja becomes pregnant, after which Hansu reveals that he is already married but intends to keep her as his mistress. Ashamed, Sunja refuses to be his mistress and ends their relationship. Her mother finds out Sunja is pregnant, but Sunja keeps the baby's father's identity a secret. Yangjin discusses the matter with one of their lodgers, a Christian minister suffering from tuberculosis who she has been caring for since his arrival at her boardinghouse months prior. Baek Isak, the minister, believes he will die soon due to his many illnesses, and decides to marry Sunja to give her child a name and to give meaning to his life, as he believes that it is a sign from God to take care of Sunja and her future child. Sunja agrees, marries Isak, and travels to Osaka to live with Isak's brother and wife. In Osaka, Sunja is shocked to learn that Koreans are treated poorly: most are forced to live in a small ghetto and are only hired for menial jobs. Sunja's brother-in-law, Yoseb, insists on supporting the entire household on his salary. Still, Sunja and her sister-in-law Kyunghee come to learn he is in heavy debt due to paying for Sunja and Isak's passage to Osaka. To repay the debtors, a pregnant Sunja sells a watch Hansu had given her in Yeongdo. Yoseb becomes furious that the woman paid off the debt without consulting him and spends the whole night away. Meanwhile, Sunja gives birth to a son, Noa.

=== Book II (1939–1962) ===
The novel jumps in time, and in Book II, Sunja raises her two children, Noa (Hansu's son) and Mozasu (Isak's son). While Noa resembles Hansu in appearance, he is similar in personality to Isak and seeks a quiet life of learning, reading, and academia. Shortly after Mozasu is born, a member of Isak's church is caught reciting the Lord's Prayer when they were supposed to be worshiping the Emperor Hirohito, and Isak is sent to prison. Despite Yoseb's resistance, Sunja begins to work in the market, selling kimchi that she and Kyunghee make at home. Their small business is profitable, but they struggle to make money as Japan enters World War II and ingredients grow scarce. Sunja is eventually approached by the restaurant owner, Kim Changho, who pays her and Kyunghee to make kimchi in his restaurant daily, providing them financial security. A dying Isak is eventually released from prison, and he can briefly reunite with his family before his death.

A few years later, on the eve of the restaurant's closure, Sunja is approached by Hansu, who reveals that he is the actual owner of the restaurant and has been manipulating her family for years, having tracked Sunja down after she sold her watch. He arranges for her to spend the rest of the war in the countryside with Kyunghee and her children and for Yoseb to wait the rest of the war out working at a factory in Nagasaki. During her time at the farm, Hansu also reunites Sunja with her mother, Yangjin, and eventually returns a permanently crippled Yoseb to the family after he is horrifically burned during the US atomic bombing.

The Baek family returns to Osaka, where Noa and Mozasu resume their studies. The family continues to struggle despite Hansu's help. Though they long to return to the North of Korea, where Kyunghee has family, Hansu warns them not to. Noa successfully passed the entrance exams for Waseda University. Despite Sunja's resistance, Hansu pays for Noa's entire university education, pretending it is simply because he feels responsible for helping the younger generation as an older Korean man.

Meanwhile, Mozasu drops out of school and works for Goro, a man who runs pachinko parlors. Mozasu meets and falls in love with a Korean seamstress, Yumi, who dreams of moving to the United States. The two marry and have a son, Solomon. Yumi later dies in a car accident, leaving Mozasu to raise their son on his own. Noa, who has continued his studies and looks up to Hansu as a mentor, accidentally discovers that Hansu is his father, and he learns of his ties to the yakuza. Ashamed of his true heritage and being linked to corrupt blood, he drops out of university and disowns his family.

=== Book III (1962–1989) ===
Noa moves to Nagano, intending to work off his debt to Hansu and rid himself of his shameful heritage. He becomes a bookkeeper for a racist pachinko owner who won't hire Koreans and lives undercover using his Japanese name, Nobuo, marrying a Japanese woman and having four children. After having abandoned his birth family and living sixteen years under a false identity, Noa is tracked down by Hansu at the request of Sunja. Though Hansu warns Sunja not to approach Noa immediately, Sunja refuses to listen to his warnings and begs Noa to reunite with her and the rest of the family. Noa promises to call, but he commits suicide shortly after Sunja leaves.

In the meantime, Mozasu has become extremely wealthy, owning his pachinko parlors and dating a Japanese divorcee, Etsuko, who refuses to marry him. Hana, Etsuko's troubled teenage daughter from her previous marriage, arrives to stay with her mother after learning she is pregnant, and later she has an abortion. Hana is drawn to Solomon's innocence, and they begin a sexual relationship. He quickly falls in love with her, giving her large sums of money, which she uses to run away to Tokyo.

Years later, Solomon, now attending college in New York City and dating a Korean-American woman named Phoebe, receives a call from a drunken Hana in Roppongi. He relays the information to Etsuko and Mozasu, who are now married. Although it is a false lead, eventually, Etsuko manages to locate Hana, who has become a sex worker. After graduating from Columbia University, Solomon takes a job at a British bank and moves back to Japan with Phoebe. His first major client project involves convincing an elderly Korean woman to sell her land to clear the way for the construction of a golf resort, which he accomplishes by calling in a favor from his father's friend Goro. When the woman dies of natural causes soon afterward, Solomon's employers claim that the deal will attract adverse publicity, and they fire him, citing his father's connections to Pachinko and implying that the woman was murdered.

With newfound resolve and a clearer outlook on life, Solomon chooses not to object when Phoebe leaves him, goes to work for his father's business, and has closure with Hana, who is in the hospital, dying of AIDS. Now an elderly woman, Sunja visits Isak's grave and reflects on her life. She learns from the cemetery groundskeeper that despite Noa's shame for his family, Noa had regularly visited Isak's grave even after moving to Nagano. This gives Sunja the closure and reassurance she needs, and she buries a photo of Noa beside Isak's grave.

== Characters ==
=== Major Characters ===
Sunja — Sunja is the main protagonist of Pachinko, appearing in all three books. Sunja is the daughter of Hoonie and Yangjin, born in Yeongdo, Busan, Korea. Sunja has two children: Noa and Mozasu. While Baek Isak raised both Noa and Mozasu, he is only Mozasu's biological father. Koh Hansu is Noa's biological father.

Yangjin – Yangjin is the mother of Sunja and wife of Hoonie. She runs a boarding house in Busan, Korea, but later relocates, through Koh Hansu, to Japan where she is reunited with Sunja and lives with her at the farm and then in Osaka.

Baek Isak — Baek Isak is a Protestant minister from Pyongyang, Korea. He is first introduced when he visits Yangjin's boardinghouse on his way to Osaka to move in with his brother, Yoseb. Sickly since birth, Baek Isak struggled with sickness until he died in Osaka.

Kyunghee — Kyunghee is Yoseb's wife, Sunja's best friend, and sister-in-law. She plays a large part in helping Sunja support their families in living, helping Sunja prepare kimchi to sell.

Yoseb — Yoseb is Baek Isak's brother in Osaka, Japan. He works in a factory to support his family. He lives in Ikaino in Osaka, where most Koreans are known to live. He received a job opportunity in Nagasaki in 1945. He became significantly injured in the subsequent US atomic bombing of Nagasaki.

Koh Hansu — Koh Hansu is a Korean man adopted into a family of organized crime in Japan. Koh Hansu continually strives to earn money and control what he can be using his connections. Hansu meets Sunja in Korea, even though he has a wife in Japan. Throughout the novel, Hansu utilizes his influence to look after Sunja and her family, keeping them alive. Hansu is driven by his love for his only son, Noa.

Noa — Noa is the only son of Koh Hansu and Sunja. He attends Waseda University in Tokyo before moving to Nagano to start a new life away from Hansu and Sunja. He struggles with identity issues stemming from his biological father's associations with the yakuza. Noa marries Risa and has four children with her, twin girls, a son and another daughter.

Mozasu — Mozasu is the only son of Baek Isak and Sunja. He faces constant bullying in school and tends to retaliate with force. As a result, he drops out of school and begins an apprenticeship as a guard at a pachinko parlor. Eventually, he moves up in the ranks and establishes his parlors. Mozasu marries a girl named Yumi and has one son, Solomon.

Solomon — Solomon is the only son of Mozasu and Yumi. Solomon did not face many of the same issues as his father or grandmother growing up since his father was very wealthy. Torn about what he wants to do with his life, he attends university in the United States. Eventually, he decides to enter the pachinko business like his father.

=== Supporting Characters ===
Hoonie — Hoonie is the first character to be introduced in the story, born with a twisted foot and a cleft palate. He meets his wife, Yangjin, on his wedding day, and they have three children who die young before Sunja, their only surviving daughter, is born. Hoonie dies of tuberculosis when Sunja is thirteen years old.

Fatso, Gombo and Sung Chung – The happy-go-lucky residents of Yangjin's boardinghouse.

Shin Bokhee and Dokhee – Bokhee and Dokhee are a pair of orphaned sisters who work at Yangjin's boardinghouse. Following World War II, their fate is left uncertain although Yangjin and Sunja theorise that they have likely died.

Kim Changho – Changho is an employee of Koh Hansu who gives Sunja and Kyunghee a job at his restaurant on Hansu's orders. He later develops feelings for Kyunghee and, despite being given permission from Yoseb to marry Kyunghee after his death, leaves for North Korea when she turns down his proposal.

Haruki Totoyama – Haruki is Mozasu's childhood friend who grows up to be a police officer. He is homosexual and cheats on his wife with other men. He remains close friends with Mozasu into adulthood and Solomon looks to him as an uncle.

Goro – Goro is the owner of a pachinko parlour who hires Mozasu and later promotes him to manager of his seventh pachinko parlour. He is often quite crude towards women however he is also generous and caring, as evidenced by his support of Haruki's single mother’s uniform shop. He remains lifelong friends with Mozasu and Haruki however his involvement in a real estate deal with Solomon inadvertently leads to Solomon's dismissal.

Yumi – Yumi is Mozasu's wife and Solomon's mother. Her mother was an alcoholic prostitute and her father a pimp, and her sister died shortly after the two of them ran away from home. Yumi is killed in a drunk driving accident. Onlookers reported that during the accident, Yumi had sacrificed herself in order to save her son's life by pushing him clear of the car.

Etsuko Nagatomi – Etsuko is Mozasu's girlfriend and Hana's mother. Prior to meeting Mozasu, Etsuko had cheated on her husband and brought shame to her family. Nevertheless, her tumultuous relationship with her daughter reaches a point of closure shortly before Hana dies of AIDS.

Hana – Hana is Etsuko's daughter. As a teenager, she befriends Solomon and uses him for money and sex. She runs away to Tokyo, engages in sex work, secludes herself from her mother, and falls into a depression. While doing so, she contracts AIDS and shortly before her death, reconciles with her mother and with Solomon.

== Themes ==
Themes in Pachinko include discrimination, stereotypes, intergenerational trauma, and power, particularly in the context of the experiences of Koreans in Japan during World War II. Lee includes various historical themes and events in her novel, including comfort women and the role of women in a Korean society. Lee's novel highlights women taking leadership in a time when men held the primary responsibility.

The novel also highlights the motif of the game pachinko, and the unpredictable and uncontrollable nature of the game is a metaphor for the characters' stories. Lee has said that the novel's title, which was initially set to be Motherland, was changed to Pachinko when, in her interviews, Koreans seemed to relate to the pachinko business.

Another pattern in this novel is discussing food as a representation of wealth. From the commodity of white rice to the labor involved with producing kimchi, Lee uses traditional concepts of meals to convey her message of disparity between peoples. Hansu's dynamic within his relationships is explored through his taste for high-brow, Japanese-style meals, contrasting with Noa's preference for fast meals typical for working-class Koreans. The success and motivations of the characters can be displayed through the foods associated with them.

=== Intergenerational Trauma ===
In Short: The families in Pachinko inherit both an elaborate structure of obligation and practical strategies for surviving insecurity. The same inheritance can sustain their lives, restrict their choices, and transmit suffering.

==== Trauma Scholarship ====
Literary scholars have also interpreted Pachinko through the related concepts of intergenerational trauma, memory, and diasporic identity. Cristina Naranjo-Lobato reads the novel through the concept of postmemory, arguing that family memory connects past and present and allows collective historical trauma to remain psychologically significant for later generations. Bingjie Liu and Bok-ki Lee similarly interpret the family's trajectories as reflecting the development, transmission, and attempted reconciliation of a Korean national trauma. Their analysis particularly emphasizes the second generation, in which mourning, anxiety, discrimination, assimilation, and questions of identity become intertwined.

Other scholarship emphasizes that this inheritance changes across generations rather than being reproduced identically. Nicole Tablizo describes the novel as an intergenerational search for Zainichi identity, examining how three generations respond differently to exclusion, nationality, identity, and social belonging as historical circumstances shift from Japanese colonialism through postwar Japan. Kang Eugene likewise characterizes Pachinko as a matrilineal family-history novel, placing women who survive the colonial period and the Korean War at the center of the family narrative. In this interpretation, women are represented not merely as witnesses to modern history but as central figures through whom the family survives and continues across generations.

== Style ==
The narrative follows the protagonist's identity formation in the style expected of the bildungsroman genre. Lee's writing style has been compared to the works of John Galsworthy and Charles Dickens.

== Historical context ==
Pachinko takes place between the years of 1910 and 1989, a period that includes both the Japanese occupation of Korea and World War II. As a historical novel, these events play a central role in Pachinko, influencing many characters' decisions.

In an interview, Lee noted that the history of Korean-Japanese people demonstrates "exclusion and otherization".

The historical background of Pachinko spans the transformation of Korea from a Japanese colony into a divided peninsula, as well as the development of the Korean community in Japan. Korean migration to Japan expanded during the colonial period, initially through largely voluntary migration for employment and education and later through wartime forced mobilization. After Japan's defeat in 1945, Koreans who remained in Japan experienced a changing legal status while the Korean peninsula was divided into competing states.

Historical context of Pachinko
| Period | Historical development | Relevance to Korean identity and the novel |
|---|---|---|
| 1910–1919 | Japanese annexation and consolidation of colonial rule | Following Japan's annexation of Korea in 1910, Korea became part of the Japanese Empire and Koreans became Japanese colonial subjects. |
| 1919–early 1930s | March First Movement and colonial rule | The March First Movement of 1919 became a major Korean independence movement against Japanese colonial rule. During the following decades, migration from Korea to Japan increased substantially as Koreans sought employment and educational opportunities. |
| 1931–1937 | Expansion of the Japanese Empire in East Asia | Japanese expansion on the Asian mainland increasingly connected colonial Korea to the empire's military and economic system. During the 1930s, Korean settlement in Japan also became more permanent, with increasing numbers of women, children, and Japanese-born Koreans. |
| 1937–1941 | Wartime mobilization and intensified assimilation | During Japan's period of total war, colonial authorities intensified efforts to transform Koreans into loyal imperial subjects. This process created a contradiction in which Koreans were expected to identify with and serve the empire while continuing to encounter ethnic distinctions and discrimination. |
| 1939–1940 | Name-changing policy | The sōshi-kaimei policy concerning the adoption of Japanese-style family and personal names took effect in 1939 and began to be implemented in 1940 as part of the wider imperialization campaign. |
| 1941–1945 | Pacific War and enforced migration | Wartime labor shortages led to increasingly coercive mobilization of Koreans. Between 1939 and 1945, approximately 700,000 to 800,000 Koreans were brought to Japan for labor, while more than 200,000 Koreans served the Japanese Empire. Koreans in Japan simultaneously remained Japanese nationals and experienced racial discrimination and economic exploitation. |
| August 1945 | Japanese surrender and liberation of Korea | Japan's defeat ended its colonial rule over Korea. Most Koreans in Japan subsequently returned to Korea, while a substantial population remained. The status of those who remained became increasingly uncertain as Japanese authorities reclassified former colonial subjects. |
| 1945–1948 | Division and occupation of Korea | Following Japan's surrender, Korea was temporarily divided at the 38th parallel, with Soviet forces occupying the north and American forces occupying the south. The division developed into competing political systems backed respectively by the Soviet Union and the United States. |
| 1948–1950 | Establishment of rival Korean states | The Republic of Korea was established in the south and the Democratic People's Republic of Korea in the north. For Koreans remaining in Japan, postwar developments also produced a changing legal status: voting rights were removed in 1945, the 1947 Alien Registration Law classified Koreans as aliens, and former colonial subjects ultimately lost Japanese nationality in the postwar settlement. |
| 1950–1953 | Korean War | North Korean forces invaded South Korea in June 1950, beginning the Korean War. The conflict became internationalized through United Nations intervention led by the United States and later Chinese intervention. The 1953 armistice entrenched the division between North and South Korea. |

== Geographic context ==
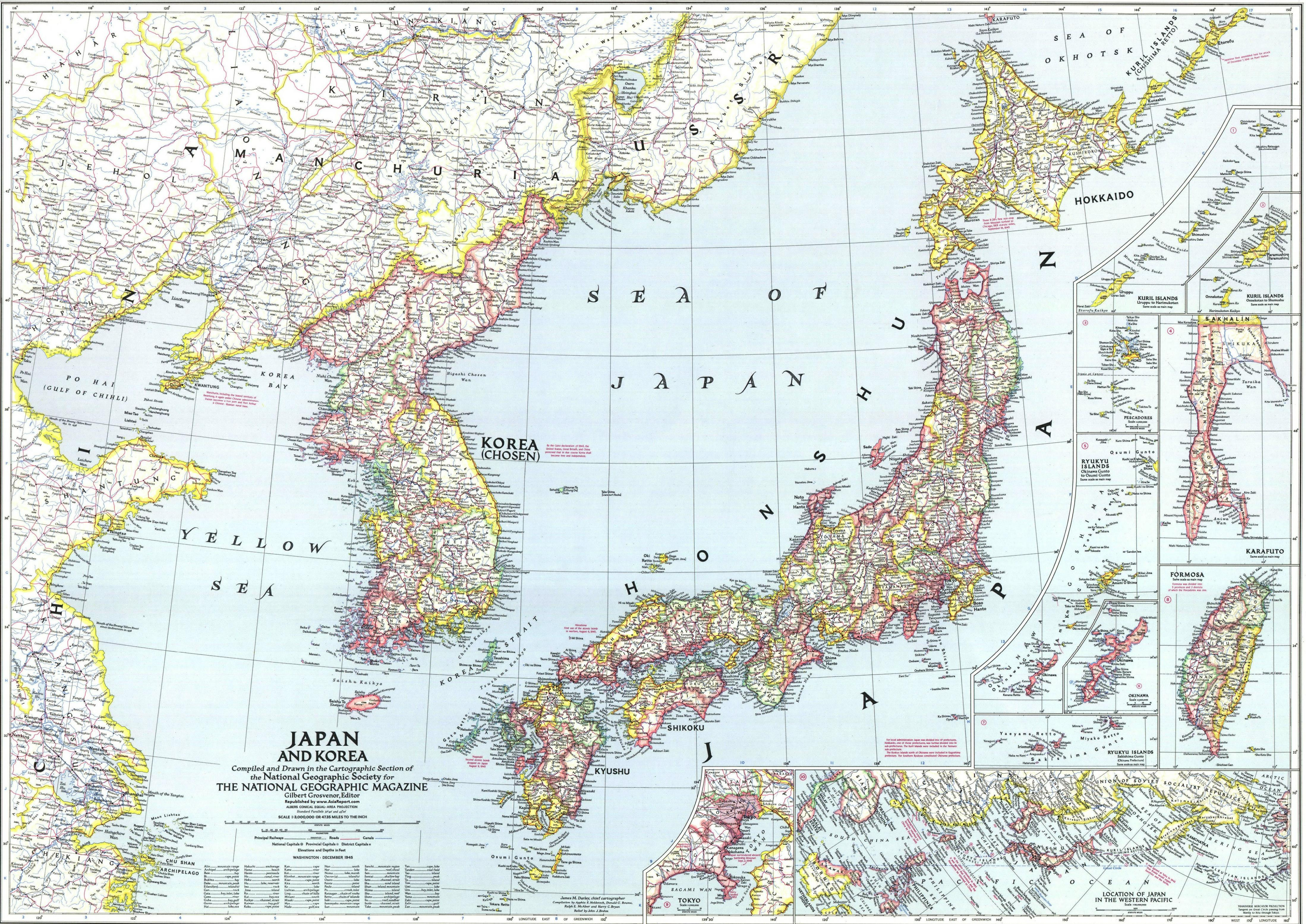
A 1945 map of Japan and Korea. The early narrative follows Isak Baek from Pyongyang south to Yeongdo, near Busan, where he meets and marries Sunja. They subsequently migrate across the Korea Strait to Osaka.

Family migration route: Pyongyang (Isak's childhood–early adulthood) → Yeongdo, Busan (several months; Isak meets and marries Sunja) → Osaka, Japan (1930s–1944; family settles in Ikaino) → Japanese countryside (1944–1945; wartime refuge) → Osaka (postwar return)

Yoseb's wartime route: Osaka → Nagasaki (wartime employment; 1945) → Osaka (after surviving the atomic bombing)

=== Migration and wartime displacement ===
The Baek family's migration follows a route from northern Korea to southern Korea and ultimately Japan during the period of Japanese colonial rule and the Pacific War. Isak Baek, a Christian minister from Pyongyang, travels south on his way to a church assignment in Japan. After becoming ill, he stays at Yangjin's boardinghouse on Yeongdo, near Busan, where he meets her daughter, Sunja. After learning that Sunja is pregnant by Koh Hansu, a married man, Isak marries her and accompanies her to Japan.

Isak and Sunja cross the Korea Strait and settle in Osaka, where they live with Isak's brother Yoseb and his wife Kyunghee in Ikaino, an area with a substantial Korean immigrant population. Sunja gives birth to Noa, and she and Isak later have a second son, Mozasu. Isak is subsequently arrested by Japanese authorities and imprisoned. His health deteriorates during his imprisonment, and he dies following his release.

During the final years of World War II, Sunja and Kyunghee support the household through food vending as wartime shortages worsen. As Allied bombing threatens Osaka, Hansu arranges for Sunja, Kyunghee, Noa, and Mozasu to relocate from the city to a farm in the Japanese countryside. Yoseb, who has traveled to Nagasaki for work, survives the atomic bombing of Nagasaki but suffers severe injuries. Following the Japanese surrender in 1945, the family remains in Japan rather than returning immediately to Korea, which has been liberated from Japanese rule but divided into Soviet and American occupation zones.

== Reception and awards ==
The book, a New York Times best seller, received strong reviews, including those from The New York Times, The Guardian, NPR, The Sydney Morning Herald, The Irish Times, and Kirkus Reviews and is on the "Best Fiction of 2017" lists from Esquire, Chicago Review of Books, Amazon, the BBC, The Guardian, and Book Riot. In a Washington Post interview, writer Roxane Gay called Pachinko her favorite book of 2017. The book was named by The New York Times as one of the 10 Best Books of 2017. In 2024, it was listed #15 on The New York Times' 100 Best Books of the 21st Century list.

Pachinko was a 2017 finalist for the National Book Award for Fiction.

| Year | Award | | Res | Ref |
|---|---|---|---|---|
| 2017 | National Book Awards | Fiction | Shortlisted | |
| 2018 | Dayton Literary Peace Prize | — | Runner Up | |

== Television adaptation ==
In August 2018, it was announced that Apple had obtained the screen rights to the novel for development as a television series for Apple TV+. The show was expected to be produced by production company Media Res with Soo Hugh serving as showrunner, writer, and executive producer; In October 2020, the series' directors and main cast were announced: South Korean filmmaker Kogonada directed four episodes, including the pilot, and served as an executive producer of the series. Justin Chon also directed four episodes. The cast includes Youn Yuh-jung, Lee Min-ho, Jin Ha, Anna Sawai, Minha Kim, Soji Arai, and Kaho Minami. It was released on March 25, 2022.

== See also ==
- Korean diaspora
- Koreans in Japan
- Koreans in New York City
- Koreatown, Manhattan
- Korean journalists in New York City
