= Gook (film) =

2017 film by Justin Chon

- Theatrical release poster
- Directed by: Justin Chon
- Written by: Justin Chon
- Produced by: Alex Chi; James J. Yi
- Starring: Justin Chon; Simone Baker; David So; Sang Chon; Curtiss Cook Jr. Ben Munoz
- Cinematography: Ante Cheng
- Edited by: Reynolds Barney; Rooth Tang
- Music by: Roger Suen
- Production companies: Datari Turner Productions; Birthday Soup Films; Fishbowl Studios; Foxtrout Studios; Tunnel Post
- Distributed by: Samuel Goldwyn Films
- Release dates: January 21, 2017 (Sundance Film Festival); August 18, 2017 (United States)
- Running time: 94 minutes
- Country: United States
- Language: English
- Box office: $250,130

Gook is a 2017 American drama film written and directed by Justin Chon. It tells the story of two Korean-American brothers running their father's shoe store, and their unlikely friendship with a neighborhood 11-year-old black girl, during the first day of the 1992 Los Angeles riots. The film stars Justin Chon, Simone Baker, David So, Sang Chon (Justin Chon's father), Curtiss Cook Jr. and Ben Munoz. The film was released on August 18, 2017, by Samuel Goldwyn Films.

== Plot ==
Eli and Daniel are two Korean American brothers who own their late father's struggling shoe store in the predominantly African-American community of Paramount, California. They develop a unique and unlikely friendship with an 11-year-old African American girl, Kamilla. The three deal with hardships on a daily basis; Eli and Daniel face racism from African Americans and Hispanics, and Kamilla has a troubled family life after the death of her mother some years earlier. Kamilla is also constantly badgered by Mr. Kim, who owns a liquor store near Eli and Daniel's shoe store; this leads to Eli often intervening on Kamilla's behalf, straining the relationship between Mr. Kim and Eli. Mr. Kim speaks to Eli in Korean and Eli replies primarily in English, and occasionally in Korean. On April 29, 1992, the news of the day is focused on the pending Rodney King assault verdict. Kamilla ditches school and heads to the shoe store; Eli stresses about the store staying afloat, while Daniel tries to have a good time, often disregarding the customers while dreaming of becoming a recording artist.

As the day passes, the verdict from the trial is read on the news, acquitting the officers for the beating of King. Because of this, racial tensions build to a breaking point in L.A. as the 1992 Los Angeles riots break out in nearby South Central Los Angeles. Daniel and Eli get into an argument over Daniel granting excessive discounts to customers, and Daniel leaves the store to record a demo tape. On the way to the recording studio, Daniel is jumped by Kamilla's brother Keith and his friends, who take his money and necklace. They only stop assaulting Daniel when Keith receives a message on his pager saying "free shit South Central", alluding to the nearby riots. Daniel proceeds to record his demo tape but cannot pay the owner of the studio due to being robbed. The studio owner convinces him to pay his debt by assisting him in looting at the riots. While driving through the riot areas, Daniel is pulled out of a car by rioters and assaulted again. Mr. Kim later picks Daniel up in his van. Mr. Kim then discloses to Daniel that he served in the South Korean military with Eli and Daniel's father as part of the country's conscription law.

As day turns to night, Kamilla goes home, where Keith finds out she has been hanging out at the shoe store because of a pair of Air Jordan sneakers in her backpack that Eli gave to her earlier that day. After a heated argument, Keith flies into a rage, as their mother's death was somehow caused by the Korean family that owned the store. Keith plots to round up his crew to rob Eli and Daniel's store of their remaining sneakers. After he leaves, Kamilla takes his other gun and runs to warn Eli and Daniel about Keith's intentions. Eli is unable to start his car and attempts to fix it, eventually realizing that he is out of gas. Shortly thereafter Mr. Kim returns with Daniel; Daniel and Eli argue briefly before Eli begins to argue with Mr. Kim before Mr. Kim provides a cigarette as a peace offering. Kim then talks to Eli about when he and Eli's father started the shoe store, and how his father and Kamilla's mother died during a robbery at the store, and how their lives weren't what they wanted to give their kids. Eli and Daniel argue over whether to remove the shoes from the premises or to surrender the shoes to Keith and lose the store, which is already two months behind on rent. Eli decides to stay behind to try to move the shoes, while Daniel and Kamilla leave. With his car unable to start, Eli packs up as many shoes as he can carry, but upon leaving the store is robbed of the shoes at gunpoint by three Hispanic gang members, who had jumped him earlier that day.

Eli reunites with Daniel and Kamilla at a nearby restaurant. They encounter Jesús, a Hispanic man from their neighborhood who helps around the store, who gives Eli a gas can to fill up his car. Jesús also discloses to them that he put the Air Jordans on the store roof; the shoes Eli thought were robbed were in fact women's shoes in the Air Jordans boxes. Eli, Daniel, and Kamilla attempt to move the sneakers when Keith arrives, forcing them to hide on the roof. Eli decides to just throw the shoes they came to steal down to them, as he had decided to close the store and seek a new beginning. Keith is convinced by his friends to leave the shoe store but eventually returns and threatens to burn the store down with a gas can and Molotov cocktails. Kamilla, with Keith's other gun, runs out to fire a shot to keep them from burning down the store but trips as she exits and shoots herself. Keith's friends leave when they hear the shot, leaving Keith and Eli to take Kamilla to a nearby hospital. Keith has an emotional breakdown directed at Eli, then himself, and Eli stops him. Eli returns to the store in the morning and shakes his head, letting Daniel know that Kamilla died. Eli tells Daniel to grab the Molotov cocktails that Keith left behind. Eli burns the store down. The final shot is the same as the first; the spirit of Kamilla dancing to the burning shoe store.

== Cast ==
- Justin Chon as Eli
- Simone Baker as Kamilla
- David So as Daniel
- Sang Chon as Mr. Kim
- Curtiss Cook Jr. as Keith
- Ben Munoz as Jesús
- Omono Okojie as Regina
- Kirlew Vilbon as Bliss
- Chris Jai Alex as Ray
- Cesar Garcia as Cesar
- Isaiah Jarel as Curtis
- Trinecia Moore-Pernell as Vivian
- Natalie Sutherland as Nurse Gianni
- Taylor Thomas as Lisa
- Lando Wilkens as Joseph

== Release ==
The film premiered at the 2017 Sundance Film Festival on January 21, 2017. On April 19, 2017, Samuel Goldwyn Films acquired distribution rights to the film. The film was released on August 18, 2017, by Samuel Goldwyn Films.

=== Critical reception ===
On review aggregator website Rotten Tomatoes, the film holds an approval rating of 94% based on 54 reviews, and an average rating of 7.0/10. The website's critical consensus reads, "From its confrontational title to its striking cinematography, this raw cinematic gem uncompromisingly proves writer/director/actor Justin Chon is a filmmaker to watch." On Metacritic, the film has a weighted average score of 69 out of 100, based on 19 critics, indicating "generally favorable" reviews.

== Accolades ==
At the Sundance Film Festival, Gook won the Best of Next! Audience Award. Chon received the Someone to Watch Award at the 2018 Independent Spirit Awards. At the 2017 Los Angeles Asian Pacific Film Festival, Gook won the awards for Grand Jury Prize, Best Director and Best Actress for Simone Baker.
