= Blue Bayou (film) =

- Theatrical release poster
- Directed by: Justin Chon
- Written by: Justin Chon
- Produced by: Charles D. King; Kim Roth; Poppy Hanks; Justin Chon
- Starring: Justin Chon; Alicia Vikander; Mark O'Brien; Linh Dan Pham; Sydney Kowalske; Vondie Curtis-Hall; Emory Cohen
- Cinematography: Matthew Chuang; Ante Cheng
- Edited by: Reynolds Barney
- Music by: Roger Suen
- Production companies: MACRO; Entertainment One
- Distributed by: Focus Features (United States); Universal Pictures (International)
- Release dates: July 13, 2021 (Cannes); September 17, 2021 (United States)
- Running time: 119 minutes
- Country: United States
- Language: English
- Box office: $951,011

Blue Bayou is a 2021 American drama film written and directed by Justin Chon. The film stars Chon, Alicia Vikander, Mark O'Brien, Linh Dan Pham, Sydney Kowalske, Vondie Curtis-Hall, and Emory Cohen.

Blue Bayou had its world premiere at the Cannes Film Festival on July 13, 2021, and was released in the United States on September 17, 2021, by Focus Features.

== Plot ==
Antonio LeBlanc is a Korean-American adoptee living outside New Orleans with his pregnant wife Kathy and her daughter Jessie. Due to his criminal record, Antonio is unable to find additional employment to support his family, though Kathy offers to resume working to help make ends meet.

After being physically harassed by New Orleans Police Department (NOPD) officers Ace and Denny, the former being Jessie’s absent biological father, Antonio is arrested. He is placed into U.S. Immigration and Customs Enforcement (ICE) custody and faces deportation when ICE found that his adoptive parents never naturalized him pursuant to Child Citizenship Act of 2000. Antonio and Kathy seek to appeal his deportation with the help of immigration lawyer Barry Boucher, who requests a $5,000 retainer. Barry warns, however, that if his appeal fails, he can never return to the United States again.

Antonio strikes up a friendship with Parker, a Vietnamese refugee with terminal cancer who came to America with her father when she was a child, and whose mother and brother had died during the journey. After receiving a tattoo of fleur-de-lis from Antonio, Parker invites his family to a communal cookout at her home. Still unable to afford Barry’s services, Antonio and his friends resort to stealing and selling motorcycles, with Antonio nearly getting caught. Antonio pays Barry, claiming that the money was an advance from work. Barry tells Antonio that due to his criminal record and a lack of factors that would make his appeal favorable, his best chance is to seek support from his adoptive mother, who is still alive, which Antonio had hidden from Kathy.

Eventually, Antonio chooses to see his now-widowed mother, who appears apathetic and unwilling to appear for his trial. Antonio is fired by his boss at the tattoo parlor due to unpaid debts. He makes amends with Parker, whose cancer has gotten worse. When she falls unconscious, he takes her to the hospital. Kathy gives birth to Antonio and her daughter, and they reunite.

On the day of Antonio’s hearing, Kathy, Jessie, his friends, Ace, and his mother, arrive to offer support, but he never shows up. Antonio, unbeknownst to them, is abducted by Denny and his friends, who assault him and leave him for dead. Knowing that he will be deported, Antonio attempts to commit suicide by drowning, but he cannot bring himself to do it. Meanwhile, Denny brags to Ace about assaulting Antonio and making him miss his hearing, but Ace, disgusted by Denny, drives him to the hospital where Kathy works and handcuffs him. Upon telling Kathy what has happened, she returns with Ace and angrily attacks Denny for his assault on Antonio.

After saying his final goodbyes, Antonio is escorted by ICE to the airport for deportation to South Korea. Intending to go with him, Kathy and Jessie manage to locate Antonio at the airport. Ace also arrives, wanting to say his farewells to Jessie before she leaves. Not wanting to displace his own family or knowing where he will be sent, Antonio tells them to remain in the United States until he is stable elsewhere. Unable to let go of an inconsolable Jessie, Antonio is forcibly separated from her as she cries out for him.

== Cast ==
- Justin Chon, as Antonio LeBlanc, who is getting deported, is a tattoo artist, Kathy's husband, and Jessie's stepfather.
- Alicia Vikander, as Kathy LeBlanc, is a rehabilitation nurse and Antonio's wife.
- Mark O'Brien, as Ace, is a police officer and Jessie's biological father.
- Linh Dan Pham, as Parker, is a Vietnamese woman who has terminal cancer.
- Sydney Kowalske, as Jessie LeBlanc, is Antonio's stepdaughter.
- Vondie Curtis-Hall, as Barry Boucher, is an immigration lawyer who helps Antonio.
- Emory Cohen, as Denny, is an NOPD officer who harasses Antonio.
- Altonio Jackson, as Quintin, is Antonio's best friend.
- Toby Vitrano, as Merk, is Antonio's friend who works for ICE.
- Geraldine Singer, as Dawn Landry, is Kathy's mother and Jessie's grandmother.
- Renell Gibbs, as Reggie, is one of Antonio's friends.
- Martin Bats Bradford, as Lajon, is another of Antonio's friends.
- Tyler Henry, as Kamal, is another of Antonio's friends.
- Sylvia Grace Crim, as Sylvia, is an NOPD desk sergeant.
- Jim Gleason, as Doctor Keegan, is a physician.
- Susan McPhail, as Susanne, is Antonio's adoptive mother.
- Sage Kim Gray portrays Antonio's biological mother.

== Production ==
In October 2019, Justin Chon, Alicia Vikander, Mark O'Brien, Linh Dan Pham, and Emory Cohen were announced to have joined the cast of the film, with Chon directing from a screenplay he wrote.

Principal photography began in October 2019, and concluded by December. It was filmed and set in New Orleans, Louisiana.

Chon worked on the movie for four years. He consulted with five adoptees, who read drafts; they were consulted throughout the writing process and Chon spent hundreds of hours on the phone with them. When he had an edit, he screened it for some adoptees and then received notes from them and changed the edit through the postproduction of the film to make sure that they felt comfortable with it. Chon said, "I couldn't consult with the entire community, but with the people who I was consulting, I was making sure that they felt that it was authentic to them." Chon spoke with adoptees Kristopher Larsen, who was director of Adoptees for Justice, and Anissa Druesedow about their experiences with the deportation process. Larsen conferred with fellow deportees as they passed around the script. Larsen said, "Every deportee we spoke to – it didn’t matter if they were from Panama, Korea, Venezuela, Vietnam, China – they all responded with the same thing: This is my story."

The movie is based on true stories Chon heard from Korean adoptee friends, as well as research that revealed a broader crisis for Asian-American adoptees of a certain age. In the U.S., the Child Citizenship Act of 2000 grants citizenship to all children adopted from overseas, but it does not protect anyone who turned 18 before the law was passed.

Chon mentioned in a GQ magazine interview, "A lot of people were adopted in the '70s and '80s. It just doesn't make sense to me. For the case of this movie, you have somebody who is a step further than that; you already have these questions of identity from being adopted. And then, not all adoptions end well. So sometimes parents give up their adopted kids, or they abuse them. Antonio goes through foster care and is abused. So to be also given up by your adoptive parents and be bounced around, and then for your country to finally say, we're also like giving you up. Psychologically, I'm sure it's absolutely devastating. So for a lot of people who get deported, there's a high suicide rate."

== Release ==
In July 2020, Focus Features acquired distribution rights to the film. It was released on September 17, 2021, after being postponed from its originally announced date of June 25, 2021. It was invited at 26th Busan International Film Festival in 'World Cinema' section of the festival program. It was to be screened on October 7, 2021.

== Reception ==
=== Box office ===
In the United States, the film was released in limited theaters alongside The Eyes of Tammy Faye.

=== Critical reception ===
Blue Bayou holds a 75% approval rating on review aggregator Rotten Tomatoes, based on 125 reviews, with a weighted average of 6.6/10. The website's critics consensus reads: "Blue Bayou can be indelicate in its attempts to tug the heartstrings, but solid acting and a genuinely affecting story make this drama difficult to ignore." On Metacritic, the film holds a rating of 58 out of 100, based on 28 critics, indicating "mixed or average" reviews.

== Controversy ==
Members of the international Korean adoptee community have criticized the film and called for its boycott, claiming it appropriated adoptee stories without consent and used inappropriate promotions, such as a VIP trip giveaway to the location where the film's traumatic events took place. Focus Features has since removed the VIP trip promotion.

Adam Crapser, a Korean adoptee raised in the United States and who was later subject to a high-profile deportation case, claims the movie is largely based upon his personal life story without his consent. In 2017, Chon reached out to him on Facebook and indicated that he learned of Crapser's story in the media. Chon wrote, "I feel like everyone in the U.S. should know what happened to you because it's ridiculous". In an interview with NBC News, Crapser stated, “People who have experienced difficult things deserve the dignity to tell their story when and if they're ready. When that is taken away – when personal traumas are forcefully misappropriated for other people's purposes – it is hurtful. I ask Justin and his team to stop using other people's trauma to support his Hollywood ambitions, and for my friends to speak the truth about this film."

Adoptees for Justice, an international nonprofit advocacy group, issued a statement that they were aware Focus Features and director Justin Chon had approached Crapser during development of the film and have since called for a formal public apology and response from Chon.

Focus Features issued a statement from Adoptee Advocacy, a newly formed group after the film with the support of Focus Features that includes members who consulted during the production, that they "see strong similarities to many of our histories: abusive families, getting in trouble with law, being deported while leaving behind small children." Adoptee Advocacy called the boycott a "devastating gut punch to us."

In response to the allegations, Chon released a statement saying that as part of his research for the film. he had worked with 13 adoptees, and that the film "is not about one person. From the onset, I did not want this film to solely reflect one individual's details".
