= Kaho Minami =

Japanese actress of Korean descent (born 1964)

- 南 果歩
- Born: January 20, 1964 (age 62); Hyōgo, Japan
- Occupation: Actress
- Years active: 1986–present
- Spouses: Hitonari Tsuji (m. 1995; div. 2000) Ken Watanabe (m. 2005; div. 2018)
- Children: 1

Kaho Minami (南 果歩, Minami Kaho; born January 20, 1964) is a Japanese actress active in film, television and commercials.

== Life and career ==
Kaho Minami was born on January 20, 1964, in Amagasaki in Hyogo, Japan, and is of third-generation Korean descent. She graduated from Toho Gakuen College of Drama & Music in Tokyo, Japan.

While attending college, Minami auditioned for the first time and got the main role in her debut film, Kohei Oguri’s For Kanako (1984). Soon after, Minami played the main role on TBS television’s drama series in 1985. Her stage play debut was as Juliet in Romeo & Juliet, directed by Tamasaburō Bandō, the legendary Kabuki actor. In the many decades following, she has appeared in numerous projects that span across theater, movies, television dramas, in both main and supporting roles. She starred in many films by filmmakers including Gakuryu Ishii's Angel Dust (1994), Masayuki Ochiai's Horror film Infection (2004), Tian Zhuangzhuang's The Go Master (2006), and Kazuyoshi Kumakiri's Sketches of Kaitan City (2010) .

Other notable appearances internationally are Oh, Lucy! (2017) with actor Josh Hartnett, Gensan Punch (2021) by Filipino director Brillante Mendoza, and Pachinko, a 2022 TV series by Apple TV+ based on Min Jin Lee's novel of the same name.

== Personal life ==
Minami was married to actor Ken Watanabe from 2005 until 2018. Their divorce was announced about a year after a media outlet reported that Watanabe, who later admitted to the allegation, had been cheating on Minami.

She focuses on various volunteer projects including the enlightenment activities of sharing her own experience as a breast cancer survivor.

== Filmography ==
=== Film ===
- Hyōryū Kyōshitsu (1987)
- Tomorrow (1988)
- Tokyo: The Last War (1989)
- Angel Dust (1994)
- Ruby Fruit (1995) – Maiko
- Open House (1997)
- J Horror Theater (2001)
- Godzilla, Mothra and King Ghidorah: Giant Monsters All-Out Attack (2001)
- The Laughing Frog (2002)
- Infection (2004) – Head nurse
- The Great Yokai War (2005)
- Night Time Picnic (2006)
- The Go Master (2006)
- Gegege no Nyoubou (2010)
- Sketches of Kaitan City (2010)
- Hankyu Railways: A 15-Minute Miracle (2011), Yasue Ito
- Gene Waltz (2011)
- Household X (2011)
- Chronicle of My Mother (2012)
- Kabukicho Love Hotel (2014)
- Masterless (2015)
- And Then There Was Light (2017)
- Oh Lucy! (2017)
- 21st Century Girl (2019)
- Blue Hour (2019)
- And Life Goes On: The Movie (2019)
- Nōten Paradise (2020)
- Gensan Punch (2021)
- Miss Osaka (2022)
- How to Forget You (2025), Yōko
- Nagasaki: In the Shadow of the Flash (2025), Reiko Nanbara
- Rules of Living (2025)
- La Campanella (TBA)

=== Television ===
- Sannen B Gumi Kinpachi Sensei (1985–1987)
- Tobu ga Gotoku (1990), Suga
- Genroku Ryōran (1999)
- Specialist (2016)
- And Life Goes On (2019)
- Awaiting Kirin (2020), Miyoshino
- Love Begins When the Money Ends (2020), Sachi Kuki
- Pachinko (2022), Etsuko
- Soul Mate (2026), Nanami Narutaki

== Awards and nominations ==
Year	Award	Category	Nominee(s)	Result	Ref.
1989	2nd Nikkan Sports Film Awards	Best Supporting Actress	Dream Street and others	Won	
1990	32nd Blue Ribbon Awards	Best Supporting Actress	Dream Street and others	Won	
1990	14th Elan d'or Awards	Newcomer of the Year	Herself	Won	
