= Jin Ha =

American actor

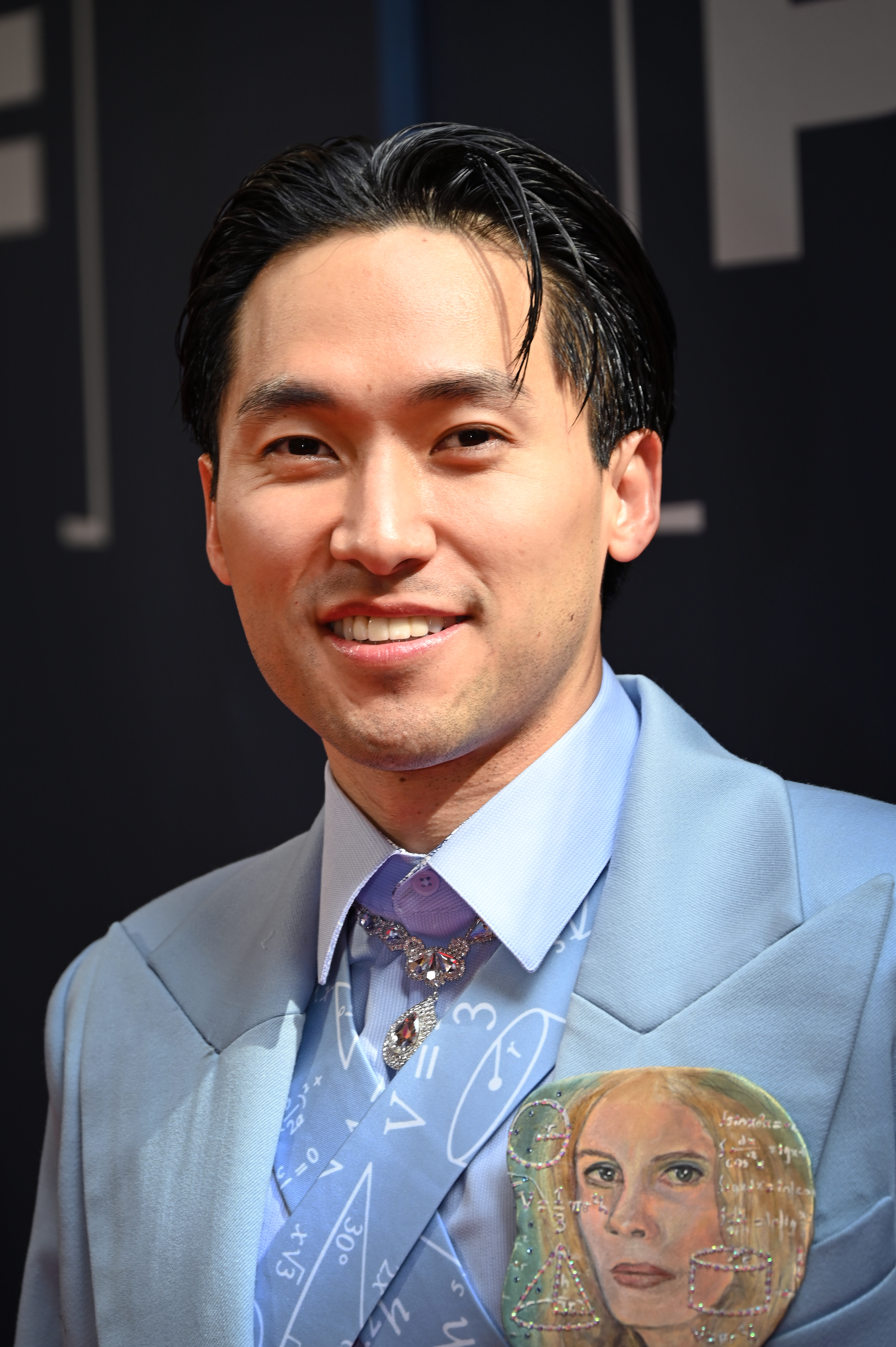
- Ha in 2026
- Born: Seoul, South Korea
- Education: Columbia University (BA); New York University (MFA)
- Occupation: Actor
- Years active: 2016–present
- Notable work: Devs; Love Life

Jin Ha is a South Korean-born American actor known for his roles in the TV series Devs, Love Life, and Pachinko in addition to the musicals Hamilton and Jesus Christ Superstar.

== Early life and education ==
Ha was born in Seoul, South Korea, before moving to the United States at the age of eight. After attending Choate Rosemary Hall, a Connecticut college-preparatory school, he enrolled at Columbia University. Though he applied to the school's theater department, Ha decided to study East Asian languages and cultures, graduating in 2013. He later obtained a graduate degree in acting from New York University Tisch School of the Arts.

== Career ==
After graduate school, Ha got his first acting job in 2016 in Troilus and Cressida with Shakespeare in the Park. He went on to join the original company of the Chicago production of Hamilton as ensemble member Phillip Schuyler/James Reynolds and as understudy of Alexander Hamilton, Aaron Burr, John Laurens/Phillip Hamilton, and King George III; Ha returned to the Chicago production in 2018 to perform as Aaron Burr, and reprised the role for the Broadway production's reopening in 2021 following its hiatus during the COVID-19 pandemic. In 2017, Ha originated the role of Chinese opera singer Song Liling opposite Clive Owen in the Broadway revival of David Henry Hwang's M. Butterfly, directed by Julie Taymor. In 2018, he played Annas in NBC's production of Jesus Christ Superstar Live in Concert, which also featured John Legend and Sara Bareilles.

In 2020, Ha starred in the FX show Devs and had a recurring role in the HBO Max show Love Life opposite Anna Kendrick. Writing in The Hollywood Reporter, reviewer Daniel Fienberg gave Love Life a lukewarm review but praised Ha's performance, saying Ha was "making a strong case that he's ready for something much better than this".

Starting in 2022, Ha stars as Solomon Baek in Pachinko, adapted from the novel of the same name by Min Jin Lee.

== Credits ==
=== Film and television ===
| Year | Title | Role | Notes |
|---|---|---|---|
| 2018 | Jesus Christ Superstar Live in Concert | Annas | |
| 2018 | Hot Air | Wendel | |
| 2020 | Devs | Jamie | Main role |
| 2020 | Love Life | Augie | Recurring role |
| 2021 | The Same Storm | Elliot Park | |
| 2022–2024 | Pachinko | Solomon Baek | Main role |
| 2024 | Civil War | Sniper | |
| 2024 | Only Murders in the Building | Marshall P. Pope | Recurring role |
| 2025 | Poker Face | Paul Fletcher | Episode: "The Game Is a Foot" |
| 2026 | Zi | Min | Also producer |
| 2026 | Sugar | Danny Moon | Main role |

=== Theater ===
| Year | Production | Role | Venue | Details |
|---|---|---|---|---|
| 2016 | Troilus and Cressida | Ensemble | Delacorte Theater | Shakespeare in the Park |
| 2016–2017 | Hamilton | James Reynolds/Ensemble u/s John Laurens/Philip Hamilton u/s Aaron Burr u/s Alexander Hamilton u/s King George III | CIBC Theatre | Regional |
| 2017–2018 | M. Butterfly | Song Liling | Cort Theatre | Broadway |
| 2018 | Jesus Christ Superstar | Annas | Marcy Avenue Armory | Concert |
| 2018 | Hamilton | Aaron Burr | CIBC Theatre | Regional |
| 2019 | Road Show | Hollis Bessemer | Encores! Off-Center | Off-Broadway |
| 2021–2022 | Hamilton | Aaron Burr | Richard Rodgers Theatre | Broadway |
| 2023–2024 | Here We Are | Soldier | The Shed | Off-Broadway |
| 2024 | A Little Night Music | Frid | David Geffen Hall | Lincoln Center |
| 2024 | Two Gentlemen of Verona | Proteus | Symphony Space | Concert |
| 2025–2026 | Hamilton | Aaron Burr | Richard Rodgers Theatre | Broadway |
| 2026 | Proof | Hal | Booth Theatre | Broadway |
| 2027 | You're a Good Man, Charlie Brown | Linus van Pelt | New York City Center | Off-Broadway |
