= Jamojaya =

2023 film by Justin Chon

- Directed by: Justin Chon
- Written by: Justin Chon; Maegan Houang
- Produced by: Alan Pao; David Matheny; Joseph Dang; Alex Chi; Yamato Cibulka; Shaun Sanghani
- Starring: Brian Imanuel; Yayu Unru
- Cinematography: Ante Cheng
- Edited by: Reynolds Barney
- Music by: Roger Suen; Agung Gede
- Production companies: 88rising Stars Collective; Tunnel Post
- Release date: January 22, 2023 (Sundance)
- Running time: 90 minutes
- Country: United States
- Languages: English; Indonesian

Jamojaya is a 2023 American drama film written and directed by Justin Chon and starring Yayu Unru and Brian "Rich Brian" Imanuel in his film debut, playing an Indonesian rap star struggling with his newfound celebrity.

== Synopsis ==
James (Brian Imanuel), an aspiring Indonesian rapper, has just been signed by a big American record label, and finds himself in Hawaii at the label's private resort to record a new album. The new deal however, comes with a few strings. Joyo (Yayu Unru), James' father has been previously managing James' career, and he's found himself unceremoniously pushed aside by the label for the polished Shannon (Kate Lyn Sheil). James struggles with the desire for fame, fortune, and independence, while maintaining his artistic integrity and loyalty to his father.

== Cast ==
- Brian Imanuel as James
- Yayu Unru as Joyo
- Kate Lyn Sheil as Shannon
- Henry Ian Cusick as Michael
- Anthony Kiedis as Dan
- Kyle Mooney as Producer

== Release ==
The film was released on January 22 at the 2023 Sundance Film Festival. Filmed in Hawaii, it made its hometown premiere at the Hawaii International Film Festival's Spring Showcase on March 31, 2023.

It was screened at the 28th Busan International Film Festival as part of 'Korean American Special Exhibition: Korean Diaspora' on October 5, 2023.

== Reception ==
On the review aggregator website Rotten Tomatoes, 78% of 18 critics' reviews are positive, with an average rating of 5.8/10. Metacritic, which uses a weighted average, assigned the film a score of 56 out of 100, based on 4 critics, indicating "mixed or average" reviews.

Nick Allen of RogerEbert.com gave the film a positive review and wrote, "Jamajaya is Chon's most soulful and calibrated film yet. It proves how his urge to explore the deepest pains of his heartfelt characters can be sublime when pitched at the right volume."

Therese Lacson of Collider graded the film a C+, as a positive review, and wrote, "Jamojaya is at its weakest when it pushes its music industry storyline to the forefront and the family drama into the background. But Imanuel and Unru's performances are enough to give this film praise..."

Angie Han of The Hollywood Reporter gave the film a positive review and wrote, "Powerful performances anchor a messy family drama."

Kate Erbland of IndieWire graded the film a C+, as a negative review, and wrote that it "continues Chon’s traditional obsessions but wraps them in a shallow story filled with predictable problems, obvious baddies, and trite lessons."

Andrew Barker of Variety gave the film a positive review and wrote, "Jamojaya is elevated above its familiar narrative paces by sensitive camerawork and a pair of intriguing performances, and its suggestion that showbusiness ambitions and family ties don’t so much collide as unravel on parallel tracks."

Fred Topel of United Press International gave the film a positive review and wrote, "Jamojaya is a father/son tale set in the recording industry between cultural barriers. Writer/director Justin Chon balances all the intersecting issues beautifully and still creates a universally moving drama."
