= Ms. Purple =

2019 film

- Film poster
- Directed by: Justin Chon
- Written by: Justin Chon; Chris Dinh
- Produced by: Alex Chi; Justin Chon; Alan Pao; James J. Yi; Mia & Daniel Dae Kim
- Starring: Tiffany Chu; Teddy Lee; Octavio Pisano; Jake Choi; James Kang
- Cinematography: Ante Cheng
- Edited by: Reynolds Barney; Jon Berry
- Music by: Roger Suen
- Production companies: Electric Panda Entertainment; MACRO; Plan Zero Productions
- Distributed by: Oscilloscope
- Release dates: January 25, 2019 (Sundance); September 6, 2019 (United States)
- Running time: 87 minutes
- Country: United States
- Language: English
- Box office: $80,657

Ms. Purple is a 2019 American drama film directed by Justin Chon. It was screened in the U.S. Dramatic Competition section at the 2019 Sundance Film Festival.

== Plot ==
Kasie and Carey live in Koreatown in Los Angeles. Abandoned by their mother and brought up by their father, the siblings struggled with profound emotional wounds from the difficulty of the parental dynamic. Now, with their father on his death bed, the estranged Carey comes home to help Kasie care for him.

== Cast ==
- Tiffany Chu as Kasie
- Teddy Lee as Carey
- Octavio Pizano as Octavio
- Jake Choi as Johnny
- James Kang as Young-Il
- Mark Krenik as Boozr
- Crystal Lee as Sora
- Alma Martinez as Juanita

== Reception ==
=== Box office ===
Ms. Purple grossed an estimated $15,734 from the Landmark NuArt in Los Angeles in its opening weekend. It expanded to three more theaters and earned an estimated $13,650, with a per-theater average of $3,413. It later opened in the top 10 markets the weekend of September 20, 2019. It went on to gross $80,657 domestically.

The film was crowdfunded via Kickstarter. Chon raised $73,634 to make the film.

=== Critical response ===
On review aggregation website Rotten Tomatoes, the film holds an approval rating of 87% based on 45 reviews, with an average rating of 7.1/10. The website's critical consensus reads: "A finely layered drama with rich visal allure, Ms. Purple sifts sensitively through the emotional wreckage of a broken family." On Metacritic, the film has a weighted average score of 71 out of 100, based on 15 critics, indicating "generally favorable reviews".

The Hollywood Reporter wrote: "dwells quietly in the limbo of those waiting for a loved one to die."
