= Pachinko (TV series) =

American drama television series

- Genre: Drama
- Created by: Soo Hugh
- Based on: Pachinko by Min Jin Lee
- Starring: Soji Arai; Jin Ha; Jun-woo Han; In-ji Jeong; Eun-chae Jung; Min-ha Kim; Lee Min-ho; Kaho Minami; Steve Sang-Hyun Noh; Anna Sawai; Jimmi Simpson; Yuh-jung Youn; Jeon Yu-na; Sungkyu Kim
- Music by: Nico Muhly
- Opening theme: "Let's Live for Today" by The Grass Roots (English ver.) and Leenalchi (Korean ver.) (season 1); "Wait a Million Years" by The Grass Roots (season 2)
- Country of origin: United States
- Original languages: Korean; Japanese; English
- No. of seasons: 2
- No. of episodes: 16

Production
- Executive producers: Soo Hugh; Michael Ellenberg; Lindsey Springer; Theresa Kang-Lowe; Richard Middleton; Kogonada; Justin Chon
- Producers: Brian Sherwin; Jordan Murcia; Lynne Bespflug
- Production locations: Mokpo; Busan; Seoul; Suncheon; Andong; Sunshine Studio (Nonsan); Hapcheon County; New York; British Columbia; Ontario; Quebec
- Cinematography: Florian Hoffmeister; Ante Cheng
- Editors: Simon Brasse; Joe Hobeck; Erica Freed Marker; Susan E. Kim; Jacob Craycroft; Sabine Hoffman
- Running time: 47–63 minutes
- Production companies: Blue Marble Pictures; A Han.Bok Dream Production; Media Res

Original release
- Network: Apple TV+
- Release: March 25, 2022 – October 11, 2024

Pachinko is an American drama television series created by Soo Hugh based on the 2017 novel by Min Jin Lee. The series premiered on Apple TV+ on March 25, 2022. It received critical acclaim for its cinematography, writing, and acting. The second season premiered on August 23, 2024.

== Synopsis ==
Pachinko follows four generations of a Korean family, from 1915 to 1989. In 1931, Sunja leaves her family in Korea under Japanese rule, to move to the Koreatown of Osaka, Japan, to start a new life. The series details the living conditions and discrimination against Korean immigrants in Japanese society.

== Cast and characters ==
=== Main ===
- Kim Min-ha and Youn Yuh-jung as Kim Sunja, (Note: Kim Min-ha plays the younger version of Sunja, while Youn Yuh-jung plays the older version. Both actors portray the character in a main capacity.) a Korean woman from Yeongdo, Busan, who struggles in Japanese-occupied Korea and later in Osaka, Japan.
  - Jeon Yu-na as child Sunja (guest season 1)
- Steve Sang-Hyun Noh as Baek Isak, (Note: Noh appears in only one episode of season 2 although credited as a main cast member.) a Protestant minister from Pyongyang, Korea. He marries Sunja after meeting her in Yeongdo, despite her already being pregnant with Noa. He is Yoseb's younger brother and Mozasu's father.
- Soji Arai as Baek/Bando Mozasu, a wealthy businessman who owns several pachinko parlors. He is Sunja's second son (the first and only child fathered by Isak) and Noa's half-brother.
  - Carter Jeong and Koren Lee as baby Mozasu (guest, season 1)
  - Eunseong Kwon as child Mozasu (recurring, season 2)
  - Mansaku Takada as teenage Mozasu (recurring, season 2)
- Lee Min-ho as Koh Hansu, a Zainichi Korean man who lives in Osaka, Japan. He is introduced as a merchant and fish broker who regularly visits Busan, South Korea. He is Noa's biological father.
- Jin Ha as Baek Solomon, Mozasu's son and Sunja's grandson, who works at Shiffley's, an American trading and finance company also operating in Japan.
  - Yoon Kyung-ho as teenage Solomon (guest, season 1)
- Han Jun-woo as Baek Yoseb, Isak's older brother who lives in Osaka, Japan. He is Kyunghee's husband and Sunja's brother-in-law.
- Jung Eun-chae as Young Kyunghee (whose Japanese name is Bando Kimiko), Yoseb's wife and Sunja's sister-in-law.
  - Felice Choi as older Kyunghee (recurring, season 1)
- Jeong In-ji as Yangjin, Sunja's mother, who runs a boarding house in Yeongdo.
- Kaho Minami as Etsuko (season 1), Hana's mother and Mozasu's girlfriend.
- Anna Sawai as Naomi Ichizaki, Solomon's co-worker at Shiffley's.
- Jimmi Simpson as Tom Andrews, Solomon's superior at Shiffley's.
- Kim Sung-kyu as Kim Chang-ho (season 2), an associate of Koh Hansu.

=== Recurring ===
- Louis Ozawa as Mamoru Yoshii, a powerful Yakuza-affiliated businessman.
  - Julian Satoshi Lee as child Mamoru (guest, season 2)
- Park Hye-jin as Han Geum-ja, a widowed landowner who is being pressured by Shiffley's into selling her land to them.
- Yoshio Maki as Katsu Abe, a client of Shiffley's.
- Ryotaro Sugimoto as Tetsuya (season 1; guest, season 2), Solomon's classmate from high school.
  - Dakatade Shoumin as teenage Tetsuya (guest, season 1)
- Mari Yamamoto as Hana (season 1), Etsuko's daughter and Solomon's ex-girlfriend.
  - Jung Ye-bin as teenage Hana (recurring, season 1)
- Yoriko Haraguchi as Hansu's Japanese wife (season 1; guest, season 2).
- Jeong So-ri as Jiyun, a wealthy Korean girl.
- Yeon Ye-ji as Shin Bokhee (season 1), Donghee's older sister, who works at Kim's boarding house.
  - Kim Young-ok as older Bokhee (guest, season 1).
- Kim Bo-min as Shin Donghee (season 1), Bokhee's younger sister, who works at Yangjin's boarding house.
- Kim Dha-sol as Sung Chung (season 1), one of the Chung brothers who lived in Yangjin's boarding house.
- Ku Sung-hwan as Fatso Chung (season 1), one of the Chung brothers who lived in Yangjin's boarding house.
- Park Min-i as Gombo Chung (season 1), one of the Chung brothers who lived in Kim's boarding house.
- Kang Tae Joo as Baek Noa (season 2), Sunja's first son and Hansu's biological son.
  - Kim Kang-hoon as teen Noa (recurring, season 2)
  - Park Jae-jun as child Noa (guest, season 1)
- Jun Kunimura as Kato Tatsumi (season 2).
- Kaito Takamura as Minoru (season 2), Noa's former classmate.
- Hiroaki Murakami as Hansu's father-in-law (season 2).
- Haeun Jang as Hyo Yoon (season 2), a tofu shop owner and friend of Noa's.
- Seiji Hino as Isamu Yoshii (season 2).

=== Guests ===
==== Season 1 ====
- Lee Dae-ho as Kim Hoonie, Sunja's father.
- Hiro Kanagawa as Mr. Goto, Mozasu's friend.
- Jeon So-hyun as a mudang, a female shaman.
- Leo Joo as Song Byung-ho, a fisherman who lived in Kim's boarding house.
- Martin Martinez as Angelo, Mozasu's employee.
- Lee Ji-hye as a Korean singer.
- Hiromitsu Takeda as Totoyama Haruki, Mozasu's best friend.
- Rome Kanda as a Japanese doctor.
- Jung Woong-in as Koh Jong-yul, Hansu's father.
- Takashi Yamaguchi as Ryoichi, Koh's employer.
- Kerry Knuppe as Mrs. Holmes, Andrew's mother.
- Jimmy Bennett as Andrew Holmes, Hansu's tutoring student.
- Bob Frazer as Mr. Holmes, Andrew's father, an American businessman.
- Dai Hasegawa as Ryoichi's son.
- Lee Hyun-ri as Kiyo, Jong-yul's girlfriend.
- Hideo Kimura as Mr. Shimamura, Yoseb's boss.

==== Season 2 ====
- Kilala Inori as Akiko Nakazono.
- Lee Joong-ok as a Korean Association leader.

== Episodes ==
Season	Episodes	Originally released	
Season	Episodes	First released	Last released
1	8	March 25, 2022	April 29, 2022
2	8	August 23, 2024	October 11, 2024

=== Season 1 (2022) ===
No. overall	No. in season	Title	Directed by	Written by	Original release date
1	1	"Chapter One"	Kogonada	Soo Hugh	March 25, 2022
The narrative begins in 1915 Yeongdo, a small island of the second largest city of Busan in Japanese-occupied Korea with Yangjin, evidently in some anguish, visiting a female shaman's house. She recounts that she is married to a kind man with a cleft-lip with whom she has born three sons, none of whom have lived beyond one year, and asks the shaman to "lift the curse" of her childbearing. The narrative jumps to 1989 in New York City, following a young, sharply-dressed Korean-American business man, who we later learn is originally from Japan and named Solomon, as he attends a performance-review meeting with two of his managers, who inform him that, despite his stellar performance, he has not been selected by executives for a promotion to Vice President. This prompts Solomon to boldly propose in the meeting that he be sent to Japan to close a stalled business deal worth millions of dollars because he is confident he can cajole a Korean woman who is holding up the deal, in order to secure for himself the promotion and pay raise he covets. Back in 1920s Korea, Yangjin and her husband give birth to Sunja, a daughter, who as a young girl is popular, bright, and capable. Sunja's parents—unnamed in the first episode—house male lodgers, at least one of whom is a drunken fisherman who, because of anti-Japanese sentiments, is a controversial figure. In 1989, Solomon travels to Japan, where, prior to his business projects, he visits his father's home, where he catches up, seemingly after a long time away, with his grandmother—the elderly Sunja—his father, and a woman who we are meant to infer is his stepmother. In the 1920s, Sunja's father falls ill and dies. Nine years after his death, she is depicted as a regular merchant in a more developed fish market, still popular, bright, and capable, where she locks impassioned eyes with Hansu, a young impeccably-dressed businessman, who evidently has only then become the market's broker.
2	2	"Chapter Two"	Kogonada	Soo Hugh & Matthew J. McCue	March 25, 2022
In Yeongdo 1930, tensions between Japanese emigrants and Korean natives remain, as Sunja's mother, Yangjin, exhorts the teenage girl not to walk unaccompanied, fearing rumors spread among Korean women about targeted assaults upon them by Japanese men. Sunja, bright and capable, dismisses the exhortation, though is accosted shortly afterward on a solitary walk near the market by a group of young Japanese men, who are within moments of raping her before the dapper and commanding market broker Hansu apprehends them and compels their apology to Sunja. In 1989 Tokyo, Solomon attends a wedding reception of the daughter of a prominent Japanese financier with two colleagues from his multinational corporation based in New York City, Shiffley. Solomon begins to immerse himself in the business culture of the Tokyo offices beneath and beside Tom Andrews and Naomi. Contemporaneously, the elderly Sunja nurses her sister-in-law, Kyunghee, as she reminisces about her past. In the 1930s, Sunja and Hansu become closer as they share details about their dreams, history, and opinions about the world. Eventually, they make love in the woods at the peak of their romance. In 1989 Japan, Solomon's father, Baek Mozasu, the owner of a pachinko arcade, secures a massive loan to expand his operations, while he and his partner take steps to discover the whereabouts of Hana. Solomon's bid to the Korean woman in pursuit of his business deal is refused, and Hana, who we infer is his childhood friend and/or stepsister, erstwhile missing inexplicably, calls him at work and evidently knows more than is imaginable about his personal and professional life.
3	3	"Chapter Three"	Kogonada	Hansol Jung and Soo Hugh	March 25, 2022
In Yeongdo 1930, Sunja and Hansu continue their love affair, and Sunja becomes pregnant after missing her period. A short period after, Hansu, who was supposed to be gone a week from his fish broker job, disappears, but returns with a pocket watch as a gift for Sunja. Sunja announces her pregnancy to him and talks about marriage; he informs her that he's married and has three daughters but intends to keep her as his mistress. Ashamed, Sunja refuses to be his mistress and ends their relationship. Later, Baek Isak, a Protestant minister stricken with tuberculosis, arrives to the boarding house and collapses. Sunja later confesses her pregnancy to Yangjin, with Isak overhearing. The next day, he accompanies Sunja to lunch, with Sunja seeing Hansu on the way to lunch and immediately walking away. Isak and Sunja have a conversation at lunch, and Isak proposes that Sunja, being pregnant and unmarried, could potentially marry him. In 1989, Kyunghee dies and is cremated. Solomon has an idea to have Sunja come talk to the Korean woman who refuses to sell her land to him, and they get along very well, being of the same generation and relate to each other. They eat rice, and Sunja recognizes the taste of the rice from her homeland. The woman sees right through Solomon, who confesses his plan to use Sunja to get her to sell. The plan seems to backfire, but back at the office Tom informs Solomon the woman indeed called him to sell. Hana calls Solomon at work, revealing she's very sick. Sunja visits Mozasu and tells him that she wants to bury Kyunghee back in Korea.
4	4	"Chapter Four"	Justin Chon	E. J. Koh and Soo Hugh	April 1, 2022
In Busan 1931, Sunja and Isak are married. Yangjin asks for Korean rice as dowry from a local merchant as Sunja is about to leave for Osaka and wants her to remember her homeland. Hansu meets Sunja in the market and berates her for marrying Isak. Sunja tells Hansu that the child is hers, not his. Yangjin offers her jewelry to sell in case of a rainy day, but Sunja shows her the pocket watch given to her by Hansu and lies saying that it was a gift from her late father. A singer on her way to the boat as the evening's entertainment drops her scarf, which Sunja gives back to her. Isak and Sunja leave for Osaka on the boat on the lower decks. In the middle of her performance, the singer shifts from an Italian aria to a traditional Korean song; as the guards close in on her, she produces a knife and commits suicide. In 1989, Sunja packs for a return to Korea, accompanied by Mozasu. Back in Korea, Sunja orders the car to stop, going out to the ocean and breaking down in tears of joy. At the meeting to close the deal, the Korean grandmother has second thoughts about signing the deal, mostly due to anti-Japanese sentiment. In a moment of empathy Solomon tells her in Korean not to do the deal. The Korean grandmother gets up and leaves, Tom erupts at Solomon, and one of the other Japanese executives tells Tom that he warned him that bringing Solomon into the deal was dangerous and that he made fools out of them. Solomon runs out of the meeting, throws off his tie, and dances in the rain to the sound of a street band. Naomi sees this and smiles.
5	5	"Chapter Five"	Justin Chon	Franklin Jin Rho and Soo Hugh	April 8, 2022
Isak and Sunja arrive in Osaka in 1931 and meet Yoseb, Isak's brother. Sunja feels like an outsider, especially as speaking Korean is frowned upon there, and is silent while the two brothers talk. Isak is warned to keep his guard up as they arrive in the area of Ikaino. There, Sunja meets Kyunghee for the first time. Upon seeing the food Kyunghee puts out for her, Sunja breaks into tears. Sunja and Kyunghee come to learn Yoseb is in heavy debt due to paying for Sunja and Isak's passage to Osaka. To repay the debtors, Sunja sells the watch Hansu had given her in Yeongdo; Hansu later buys back the watch in secret. In Busan 1989, Sunja and Mozasu scatter Kyunghee's ashes into the sea. They try to locate her father's grave but realize it has been moved due to construction of a parking lot. Through the Clerk's office, Sunja learns that Shin Bokhee, who she worked with in her boarding house as a young girl, is alive and through her is able to locate her father's grave. In Tokyo 1989, Solomon meets with Arimoto, who says he will do his best to defend his reputation after the deal collapses. Arimoto tells him that he should look for Hana at the Yoshiwara area by Uguisudani Station. He searches for her to no avail but runs into Haruki, his father's old friend. Solomon takes a phone call from Tom, who tells him that he's been fired, causing Solomon to panic because his work visa was sponsored by Shiffley's. Before he can respond, Hana calls and tells him she's in grave danger.
6	6	"Chapter Six"	Justin Chon	Lauren Yee and Soo Hugh	April 15, 2022
In Osaka 1931, Yoseb berates Sunja and Kyunghee for paying off his debts because it made him look weak. Sunja's water breaks prematurely and she gives birth to a son. Sunja asks Yoseb to name the baby, so he gives him the name Noa. In a different part of town, Isak is entreated by a widow who asks him to speak to her son, who is refusing to speak to her. Isak finds the young man, who expresses his anger at being exploited by the Japanese. In Tokyo 1989, Mozasu and Etsuko find Hana but the doctor tells them she is dying of AIDS. Solomon tries to convince Hana to go to America to seek a cure for her condition; she refuses, telling him that the Hana he knew is gone and that despite all his degrees and fancy clothing the Japanese in business will never accept him because of his race. Solomon cleans out his desk at Shiffley's and leaves, throwing his box into a nearby fountain. He runs into Mamoru Yoshii, who proposes expanding a potential Pachinko business beyond Japan to Korea, Thailand, and Macau. Solomon tells Sunja that he was fired and blames her for his moment of weakness that led to him telling the Korean grandmother not to sign the deal.
7	7	"Chapter Seven"	Kogonada	Ethan Kuperberg and Soo Hugh	April 22, 2022
In 1923, a young Hansu lives in Yokohama with his single father Jong-yul, who works as a bookkeeper at an underground boxing ring owned by Ryoichi, a yakuza. Hansu earns money tutoring the dim-witted son of the wealthy Holmes family of American industrialists, whose matriarch suggests sending Hansu to Yale alongside their son. Jong-yul is discovered embezzling money from the yakuza and is about to be executed by Ryoichi's men when the city is suddenly struck by the 1923 Great Kanto Earthquake, which kills Jong-yul and his would-be executioners. In the aftermath of the earthquake, Hansu finds the bodies of the Holmes family, from whom he takes the pocketwatch he later gifts to Sunja, and encounters Ryoichi, who helps to hide Hansu from a group of vigilantes attacking Koreans. When he finally encounters his family, Ryoichi vows that they will take in Hansu, who still has his "father's debt to pay."
8	8	"Chapter Eight"	Justin Chon	Mfoniso Udofia and Soo Hugh	April 29, 2022
Now 1938 in Osaka, Isak gets Noa after school and, together with Sunja, they celebrate Mozasu's first birthday. A member of Isak's church is caught reciting the Lord's Prayer when they were supposed to be worshipping the emperor, and Isak is sent to prison. Sunja discovers that the real reason for Isak's arrest is that he is involved in a communist cell. Sunja begins to work in the market, selling kimchi that she and Kyunghee make at home. In Tokyo 1989, Etsuko is told by the doctor that Hana will require a tremendous amount of morphine to numb her pain as she passes away. Etsuko yells at Mozasu after he tells her that she should do what is best for Hana and storms off. Hana dies from her illness just as Solomon comes in to say goodbye. The episode ends with stories from actual Zainichi Koreans in Tokyo 2021.

=== Season 2 (2024) ===
No. overall	No. in season	Title	Directed by	Written by	Original release date
9	1	"Chapter Nine"	Leanne Welham	Soo Hugh	August 23, 2024
In 1945, Sunja is living in Osaka with her two sons, a teenaged Noa and a much younger Mozasu. Noa is shy and Mozasu is outgoing, but they both struggle to find harmony at school while their mother sells kimchi to provide. American planes leaflet their town, urging its citizens to petition to end the war. During a cabbage shortage, Sunja bootlegs soju for sale on the black market and is arrested, although she is released the next morning. Kim Chang-ho picks her up to take her to see Hansu, where it is implied that he is the reason for Sunja's release. Hansu warns Sunja that bombing is imminent and insists that she and her family shelter in the countryside, but she refuses to leave the imprisoned Isak. In 1989, Solomon looks for financing in Tokyo, but the fallout from the Shiffley's land deal becomes an obstacle for him. Out of pride, he refuses money from Sunja and Mozasu, and his stress leads him to blow up at a baker for insulting Sunja's Japanese language skills.
10	2	"Chapter Ten"	Leanne Welham	Soo Hugh & Christina Yoon and Melissa Park	August 30, 2024
In 1945, a terminally ill Isak is released from prison. Noa retrieves the respected Pastor Hu to pray over his dying father, whereupon Hu admits that he turned Isak in because he was jealous of his popularity; Isak forgives him over Noa's objections. Meanwhile, Sunja turns to Hansu for help, and Hansu promises to send the city's best doctor if she leaves Osaka before its bombing; Sunja assents. Despite the doctor's efforts, Isak dies, and Sunja and her family are forced to leave his cremated remains behind as the bombing of Osaka begins. In 1989, Solomon begs Katsu Abe, who has blacklisted him in Japan, for mercy, but Abe explains that he is sending the business community the message that he is not to be crossed. Solomon entreats Han Geum-ja, the holdout landowner from the Shiffley's deal, to help him seek revenge. She reveals that there are bodies buried on the plot and agrees to sell with the intention of tanking the deal.
11	3	"Chapter Eleven"	Arvin Chen	Melissa Park	September 6, 2024
In 1945, Hansu brings Sunja and her family to a house in the countryside, with his man Kim Chang-ho joining them for protection. Sunja and Kyunghee work the rice fields, and the boys enjoy life in the countryside and occasional visits from Hansu. During a nighttime stakeout, Chang-ho and the boys catch Minoru, an egg thief and former bully of Noa's. Given a choice by Chang-ho, Noa chooses to let the thief go with a warning. In 1989, Sunja befriends Kato Tatsumi, an elderly worker who witnessed Solomon's outburst. Solomon attempts to mend fences with Tom Andrews at Shiffley's and is asked out to dinner by Ichizaki Naomi.
12	4	"Chapter Twelve"	Arvin Chen	Ethan Kuperberg and Soo Hugh	September 13, 2024
In 1945, Hansu surprises Sunja by reuniting her with her mother. After a car ride, Hansu and Sunja kiss, but she relents. Noa becomes friends with Minoru, and the two witness Hansu viciously beating the farm foreman for stealing. The shed containing the rice harvest burns down, and Kyunghee and Chang-ho begin an affair. In 1989, Sunja visits Solomon in Tokyo and invites Naomi in for dinner, where Naomi discusses an upcoming IPO she is working on. Later, Naomi and Solomon make love. Upon the discovery of human remains beneath Geum-ja's plot, the hotel chain backs out of the development deal, and Solomon urges Tom to swoop in.
13	5	"Chapter Thirteen"	Arvin Chen	David Mitchell and Soo Hugh	September 20, 2024
In early August of 1945, Yoseb is working in a factory in Nagasaki when the Americans drop an atomic bomb on the city. Yoseb survives with severe burns to his face. Shortly after the war's end, the family and Chang-ho leave the countryside and return to a firebombed Osaka. Several years later, in 1950, Chang-ho still lives with the family and entreats Hansu to release him from their service, as his relationship with Kyunghee has become awkward. Sunja and her mother operate a noodle stall with plans to open a restaurant, and Noa takes his university exams on June 25, the day the Korean War breaks out. In 1989, Solomon and Tom attempt to convince Mamoru Yoshii to join them in a bid on the undeveloped land, but Shiffley's backs out of the bid when Naomi points out that the firm's relationship with Abe is worth more. Tom tells Solomon that he had a prior tryst with Naomi.
14	6	"Chapter Fourteen"	Sang-il Lee	Karen Chee and Chang-rae Lee	September 27, 2024
In 1950, an agoraphobic Yoseb becomes suspicious about Kyunghee's feelings towards Chang-ho. After witnessing a Korean Communist making a public speech and being forced to beat a man on Hansu's behalf, Chang-ho starts to become disillusioned with his work. Hansu's father-in-law arranges a marriage for Hansu's daughter and threatens to reveal his relationship to Noa if Hansu refuses the match. Noa is admitted to university in Tokyo, but his family cannot afford its cost without turning to Hansu for a loan, which Noa balks at. In 1989, Sunja goes on a date with Kato, of whom Mozasu is suspicious. A Korean associate of Mamoru reveals to Solomon that Naomi is already engaged to be married, which Solomon confirms for himself. Solomon urges Tom to overcome Naomi's objection to their land deal by any means.
15	7	"Chapter Fifteen"	Sang-il Lee	Haruna Lee and Soo Hugh	October 4, 2024
In 1950, Hansu gifts Noa with the pocket watch he once gave to Sunja. During a tense send-off dinner, after Yoseb berates Kyunghee's cooking, Mozasu insists he leave the house, and the boys bring him to a baseball game. As Chang-ho makes preparations to leave Japan and join the North Korean army, Yoseb acknowledges that Kyunghee loves him and encourages him to say goodbye to her. Hansu has his father-in-law killed at the hands of Isamu Yoshii, yakuza grandfather of Mamoru. In 1989, Shiffley's demands Naomi's resignation for leaking the details of an upcoming IPO to Solomon during their dinner with Sunja. Sunja gifts Kato with money to help with his expenses, as Mozasu discovers that he was court-martialed for participating in a massacre of Allied POWs during the war.
16	8	"Chapter Sixteen"	Sang-il Lee	Chang-rae Lee	October 11, 2024
In 1951, Noa begins dating blue-blooded fellow student Akiko Nakazono, who intrudes on a dinner he is having with Hansu. During a fight afterwards, Akiko implies that Hansu is Noa's father. Noa visits Hansu, who confirms it. Noa returns home for a brief visit, before disappearing and moving to Nagano, where he pawns Hansu's watch and assumes the name Ogawa Minato. Mozasu is offered a job at the local pachinko parlor, where he first encounters Isamu and a young Mamoru. In 1989, Mozasu confronts Mamoru over his business dealings with Solomon and threatens him should any ill befall his son. Solomon announces the construction of an exclusive golf club on the land and pays off the remaining loan on his father's business. Abe commits suicide after losing face in the deal.

== Production ==
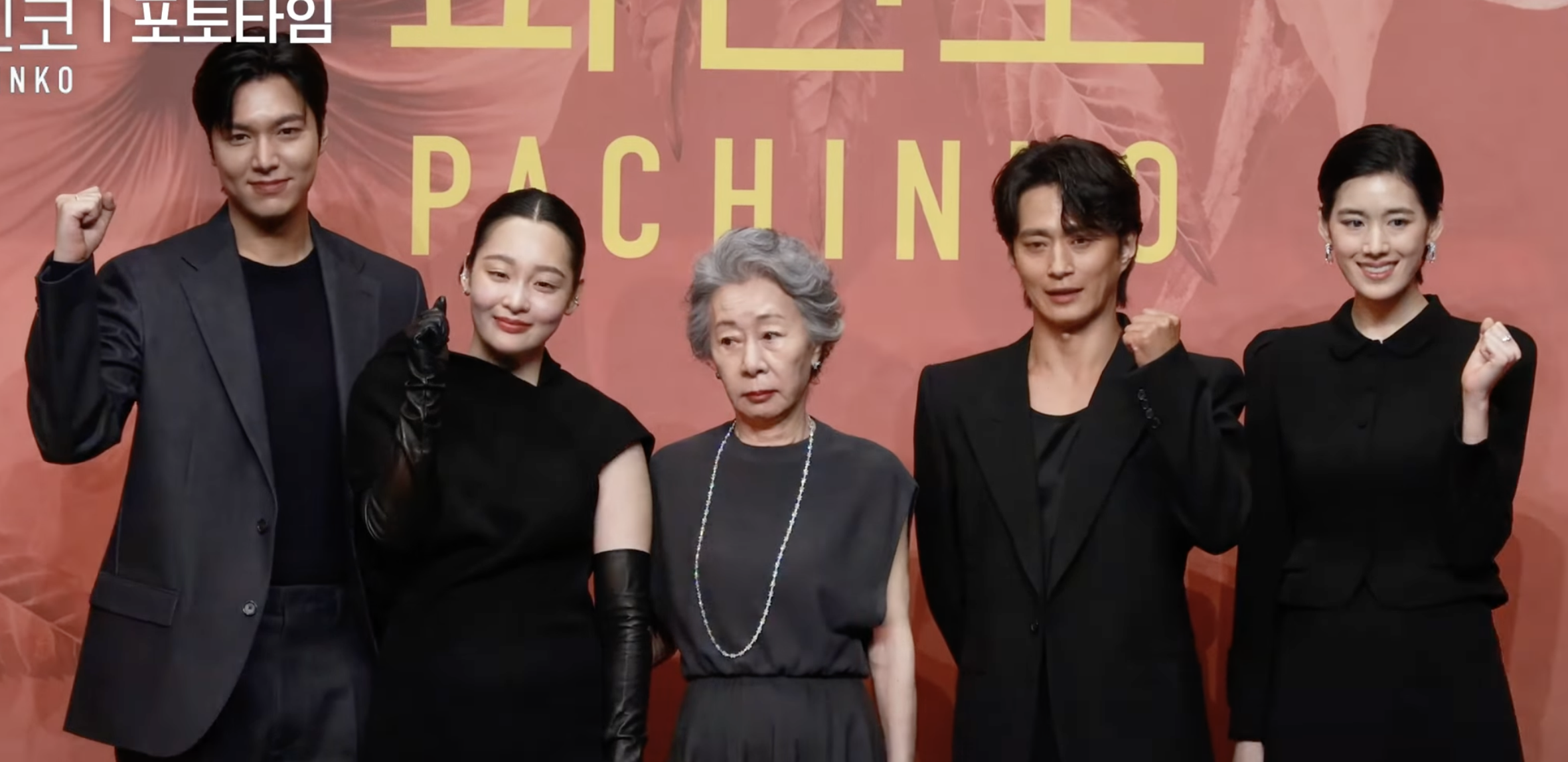
The cast of Pachinko, including Lee Min-ho, Kim Min-ha, Youn Yuh-jung, Han Jun-woo and Jung Eun-chae.

In August 2018, Apple Inc. obtained the rights to the series, which was given a series order in April 2019. The reports also included that Soo Hugh would act as showrunner, writer, and executive producer for the series. The production company, Media Res, would also produce alongside Hugh. In October 2020, Lee Min-ho, Jin Ha, Anna Sawai, Minha Kim, Soji Arai, and Kaho Minami were announced to star, with South Korean filmmaker Kogonada and Justin Chon set to executive-produce and direct four episodes each. Hugh said it took six to seven months of worldwide search to cast the main actors and that she had asked all her actors to audition for their roles. Filming was set to commence on October 26, 2020, in South Korea, Japan, and North America. Lee Min-ho said he had finished filming in Busan, South Korea, in December 2020 and that he was preparing to film in Canada. Filming in Vancouver was scheduled to take place between February 6 and April 9, 2021.

The show's opening theme song is "Let's Live for Today" by The Grass Roots. Hugh said she originally thought about selecting "Out of Time" by The Rolling Stones but they were unable to secure the rights to that song. The title sequence was shot several times with different songs until "Let's Live for Today" was added during post-production.

In February 2022, The New Yorker revealed that Min Jin Lee had been, but was no longer, involved in the production of the show based on her novel. The reason for her lack of involvement moving forward was not given.

In April 2022, Apple renewed the series for a second season. Filming was scheduled to take place in Toronto from January 9 to March 27, 2023, and in Japan from March 27 to June 16, 2023. Leanne Welham was to direct four episodes of the second season.

Hugh said that she planned on a three or four season arc for the series. In July 2025, nine months after the conclusion of the second season, Apple TV+ development chief Matt Cherniss said they "[do not] have anything to announce about future seasons".

== Release ==
The first season, consisting of 8 episodes, was produced in three languages (Korean, Japanese, and English). It premiered on March 25, 2022, on Apple TV+ with 3 episodes. One episode was then released every Friday until April 29, 2022. The second season premiered on August 23, 2024, with weekly releases continuing until the season finale on October 11, 2024.

== Viewership ==
On June 6, 2026, the series premiered on tvN and aired every Saturday and Sunday at 21:10 (KST).

Pachinko : South Korea viewers per episode (thousands)

Season	Episode number								Average
Season	1	2	3	4	5	6	7	8	Average
1	726	986	511	657	503	530	507	625	630
2	N/A	404	N/A	N/A	343	369	377	N/A	N/A

Source: Audience measurement performed nationwide by Nielsen Korea.

=== Season 1 ===
Average TV viewership ratings (season 1)
Ep.	Original broadcast date	Average audience share (Nielsen Korea)	
Ep.	Original broadcast date	Nationwide	Seoul
1	June 6, 2026	2.947% (1st)	3.210% (1st)
2	June 7, 2026	4.123% (1st)	4.706% (1st)
3	June 13, 2026	2.189% (1st)	2.465% (1st)
4	June 14, 2026	3.041% (1st)	2.991% (1st)
5	June 20, 2026	2.208% (1st)	2.616% (1st)
6	June 21, 2026	2.216% (2nd)	2.442% (1st)
7	June 27, 2026	2.015% (1st)	2.138% (1st)
8	June 28, 2026	2.868% (1st)	3.167% (1st)
Average		2.700%	2.966%

=== Season 2 ===
Average TV viewership ratings (season 2)
Ep.	Original broadcast date	Average audience share (Nielsen Korea)	
Ep.	Original broadcast date	Nationwide	Seoul
1	July 18, 2026	0.8% (39th)	—N/a
2	July 19, 2026	1.776% (2nd)	1.897% (2nd)
3	July 25, 2026	1.0% (22nd)	1.102% (10th)
4	July 26, 2026	1.5% (11th)	1.555% (10th)
5	August 1, 2026	1.340% (9th)	1.549% (5th)
6	August 2, 2026	1.541% (6th)	1.640% (2nd)
7	August 8, 2026	1.604% (4th)	1.783% (3rd)
8	August 9, 2026	1.473% (9th)	1.635% (5th)
Average		1.379%	—
In the table above, the blue numbers represent the lowest ratings and the red numbers represent the highest ratings.; This drama aired on a cable channel/pay TV which normally has a relatively smaller audience compared to free-to-air TV/public broadcasters (KBS, SBS, MBC and EBS).

== Reception ==
=== Critical response ===
Critical response of Pachinko
Season	Rotten Tomatoes	Metacritic
1	97% (63 reviews)	87 (29 reviews)
2	97% (39 reviews)	87 (22 reviews)

On Rotten Tomatoes, the first season holds an approval rating of 97% based on 63 critic reviews. The website's critical consensus reads, "Intricate yet intimate, Pachinko is a sweeping epic that captures the arc of history as well as the enduring bonds of family." On Metacritic, it has a score of 87 out of 100 based on 29 critics. The episode "Chapter Seven" was listed as one of the best TV episodes of 2022 by The New York Times, Rolling Stone and Collider.

The second season has a Rotten Tomatoes approval rating of 97% based on 39 critic reviews. The website's critical consensus reads, "Pachinko's second season continues the travails and triumphs of the Baek family with ever-expanding breadth without missing a beat, further cementing this soulful series as one of television's best." On Metacritic, it has a score of 87 out of 100 based on 22 critics.

=== Critics' top ten list ===
2022
- No. 1 Entertainment Weekly (Kristen Baldwin)
- No. 2 Entertainment.ie
- No. 2 The Hollywood Reporter (Angie Han)
- No. 2 Vulture (Kathryn VanArendonk)
- No. 6 Slant
- No. 6 TV Insider
- No. 8 The Hollywood Reporter (Daniel Fienberg)
- No. 8 TV Guide
- No. 8 Vulture (Roxana Hadadi)
- No. 9 The A.V. Club
- No. 9 The Playlist
- No. 9 Rolling Stone
- No. 9 TVLine
- No. 10 The Ringer
- – The Economist
- – Lifehacker
- – Los Angeles Times (Lorraine Ali)
- – Los Angeles Times (Robert Lloyd – new shows only)

=== Accolades ===
Year	Award	Category	Nominee(s)	Result	Ref.
2022	AAFCA TV Awards	Best International Production	Pachinko	Won	
2022	American Film Institute Awards	Top 10 Programs of the Year	Pachinko	Won	
2022	Artios Awards	Outstanding Achievement in Casting – Television Pilot and First Season Drama Series	Mary Vernieu, Michelle Wade Byrd, Ko Iwagami, Corinne Clark, and Jennifer Page	Nominated	
2022	Asia Contents Awards	Rising Star Award	Kim Min-ha	Won	
2022	C21 International Drama Awards	Best Non-English Language Drama Series	Pachinko	Won	
2022	Clio Music Awards	Silver Winner	Pachinko "Epic"	Won	
2022	Clio Music Awards	Bronze Winner	Pachinko "Home"	Won	
2022	Dorian TV Awards	Best Non-English Language TV Show	Pachinko	Nominated	
2022	Edinburgh TV Awards	Best International Drama	Pachinko	Won	
2022	Primetime Creative Arts Emmy Awards	Outstanding Main Title Design	Angus Wall, Nadia Tzuo, Florian Hoffmeister, Ante Cheng, Nathaniel Park, and Lucy Kim	Nominated	
2022	Golden Trailer Awards	Best Foreign Spot for a TV/Streaming Series	Pachinko "Home"	Nominated	
2022	Golden Trailer Awards	Best Music for a TV/Streaming Series	Pachinko "Home"	Nominated	
2022	Gotham Independent Film Awards	Breakthrough Series – Long Form	Pachinko	Won	
2022	Gotham Independent Film Awards	Outstanding Performance in a New Series	Kim Min-ha	Nominated	
2022	Hollywood Critics Association TV Awards	Best Streaming Series, Drama	Pachinko	Nominated	
2022	Hollywood Critics Association TV Awards	Best International Series	Pachinko	Nominated	
2022	Hollywood Critics Association TV Awards	Best Writing in a Streaming Series, Drama	Soo Hugh (for "Chapter One")	Nominated	
2022	Humanitas Prize	Drama Teleplay	Soo Hugh (for "Chapter One")	Won	
2022	LMGI Awards	Outstanding Locations in a Period Television Series	Pachinko	Nominated	
2022	Marie Claire Asia Star Awards	Beyond Cinema Award	Kim Min-ha	Won	
2022	Rose d'Or Awards	Drama	Pachinko	Nominated	
2022	Satellite Awards	Best Miniseries & Limited Series	Pachinko	Nominated	
2022	Television Critics Association Awards	Outstanding Achievement in Drama	Pachinko	Nominated	
2022	Television Critics Association Awards	Outstanding New Program	Pachinko	Nominated	
2022	Peabody Awards	Best Entertainment	Pachinko	Won	
2023	Art Directors Guild Awards	Excellence in Production Design for a One-Hour Period Single-Camera Series	Mara LePere-Schloop (for "Chapter One")	Won	
2023	British Academy Television Awards	Best International Programme	Soo Hugh, Michael Ellenberg, Lindsey Springer, Theresa Kang, Richard Middleton, and Kogonada	Nominated	
2023	British Society of Cinematographers Awards	Best Cinematography in Television Drama	Florian Hoffmeister (for "Chapter Three")	Nominated	
2023	Critics' Choice Awards	Best Foreign Language Series	Pachinko	Won	
2023	Independent Spirit Awards	Best Ensemble Cast in a New Scripted Series	Soji Arai, Jin Ha, In-ji Jeong, Min-ha Kim, Kaho Minami, Lee Min-ho, Noh Sang-hyun, Anna Sawai, Jimmi Simpson, and Yuh-jung Youn	Won	
2024	Fundex Awards	Best Actor in an OTT Original Drama	Lee Min-ho	Won	
2024	Rose d'Or Awards	Drama	Pachinko Season 2	Nominated	
2025	Critics' Choice Television Awards	Best Foreign Language Series	Pachinko Season 2	Nominated	
2025	Critics' Choice Television Awards	Best Supporting Actress in a Drama Series	Anna Sawai	Nominated	
2025	Dorian TV Awards	Best Non-English Language TV Show	Pachinko Season 2	Nominated	
2025	Primetime Creative Arts Emmy Awards	Outstanding Cinematography for a Series (One Hour)	Ante Cheng	Nominated	
2025	Primetime Creative Arts Emmy Awards	Outstanding Production Design for a Narrative Period or Fantasy Program (One Hour or More)	Ruth Ammon, Larry Spittle, Eric Jeon, and Ann Victoria Smart	Nominated	
2025	Set Decorators Society of America Awards	Best Achievement in Décor/Design of a One Hour Period Series	Ann Victoria Smart and Ruth Ammon	Nominated	
2025	Seoul International Drama Awards	Best Miniseries	Pachinko Season 2	Won	
2025	Seoul International Drama Awards	Best Director	Leanne Welham	Nominated	
2025	Seoul International Drama Awards	Best Screenwriter	Soo Hugh	Nominated	
2025	Seoul International Drama Awards	Best Actress	Kim Min-ha	Won	

== See also ==
- Korean diaspora
- Koreans in Japan
- Koreans in New York City
- Koreatown, Manhattan
- Korean journalists in New York City
