= Justin Chon =

Korean-American actor and director

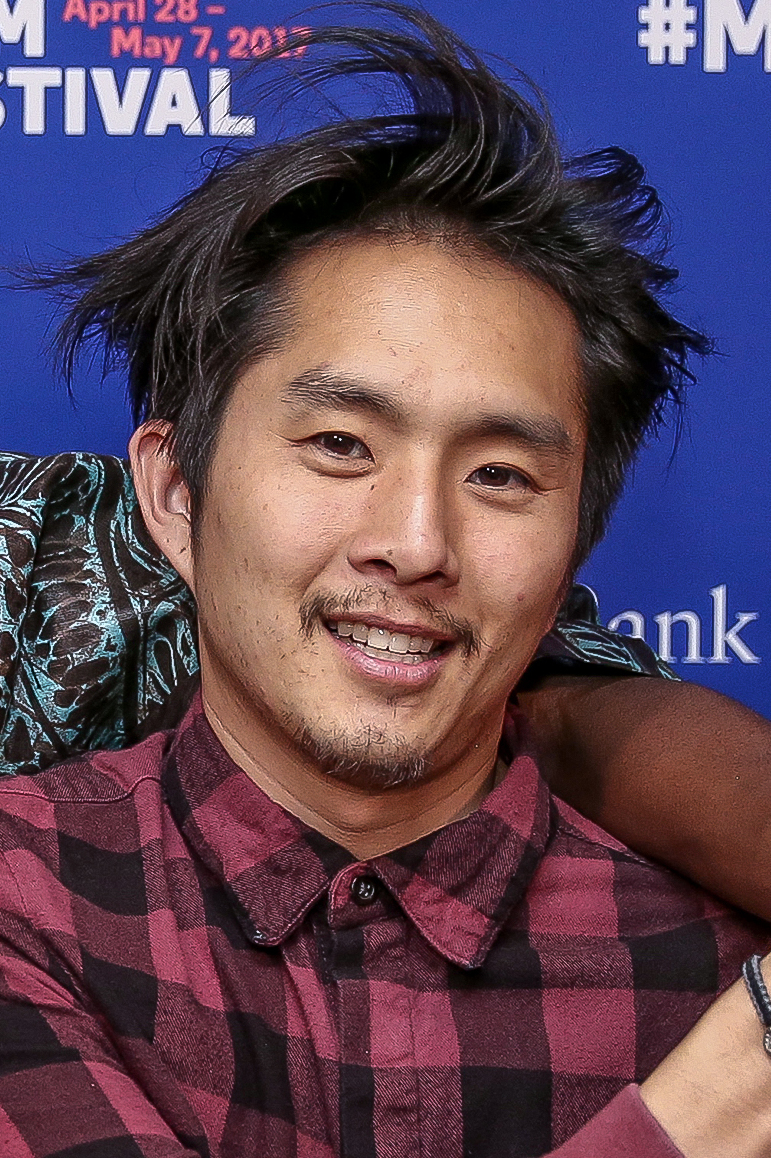
- Chon in 2017
- Born: Justin Jitae Chon; May 29, 1981 (age 45); Garden Grove, California, U.S.
- Education: University of Southern California
- Occupations: Actor; director; writer; YouTuber
- Years active: 2005–present
- Spouse: Sasha Egorova (m. 2014)
- Children: 2
- Website: tenthandfourth.com

Justin Jitae Chon (born May 29, 1981) is an American actor and filmmaker. He has directed four films, Gook (2017), Ms. Purple (2019), Blue Bayou (2021), and Jamojaya. He is also known for portraying Eric Yorkie in The Twilight Saga film series. He is a member of the K-pop parody group Boys Generally Asian.

== Early life ==
Chon was born in Garden Grove, California, and raised in Irvine, California, where he attended University High School. Chon is of Korean descent. His father, Sang Chon, was an actor in South Korea and later a shoe wholesales owner in Paramount, California. His mother is a pianist. He has a younger sister.

Chon attended the University of Southern California (USC), where he majored in business. During college, he studied abroad at Yonsei University in Seoul, South Korea.

== Career ==
=== Acting ===
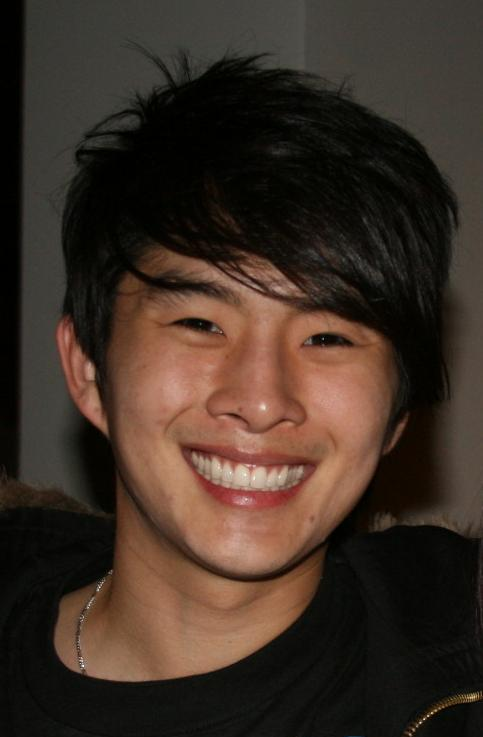
Chon in 2009

Chon started acting in 2005 in shows such as Jack & Bobby and Taki & Luci. He came to fame in 2006 when he played Peter Wu in the Disney Channel film Wendy Wu: Homecoming Warrior. He also played Tony Lee in the Nickelodeon sitcom Just Jordan. In 2008, he played Eric Yorkie in the film Twilight, based on the book by Stephenie Meyer. Chon reprised his role as Eric Yorkie in the Twilight sequel New Moon. He starred as the central character Jeff Chang, in the film 21 & Over in 2013. He also appeared in the independent film Innocent Blood that same year.

In 2014, Chon appeared as a lead character in crime drama film Revenge of the Green Dragons, which was executive produced by Martin Scorsese. In 2015, Chon starred as Sid Park, the trouble-making main character influenced by rocker culture in the independent film Seoul Searching, directed by Benson Lee, which made its premiere at the 2015 Sundance Film Festival.

Chon trained for over two years in the Meisner technique at the Baron Brown Studio in Santa Monica and guest starred in the Studio web series Joanne Brown Is Here with Hana Mae Lee and Joanne Baron in 2016. Chon also held a role in the Korean-American comedy drama Dramaworld. In March 2017, he was cast as a series regular in the ABC crime drama Deception.

Chon starred in the 2018 movie High Resolution with Ellie Bamber, directed by Jason Lester. The movie was based on the acclaimed novel Taipei by author Tao Lin.

=== Directing ===
Chon also co-wrote (with Kevin Wu), directed, executive produced, and starred in the 2015 feature film Man Up. The film made its premiere at the 2015 CAAMFest. It was also screened at the 2015 Los Angeles Asian Pacific Film Festival, making its West Coast premiere there. The film is set in Hawaii and also stars Kevin Wu, Amy Hill, Parvesh Cheena, Nichole Bloom, Dion Basco, Samantha Futerman and more. In March 2015, the film was acquired by "Off the Dock", a digital studio owned by Lakeshore Entertainment.

Chon has also directed several digital short films that are viewable on his YouTube Channel, including You're Stoopid (2013), Full Circle (2013) and 90 Day Visa (2015).

In 2017, Chon wrote, directed, produced and starred in a film entitled Gook, which premiered at the 2017 Sundance Film Festival, where it won the NEXT Audience Award and was picked up by Samuel Goldwyn Distribution. The film also won Grand Jury Award for Best Narrative Feature Film, Best Director (Justin Chon), Best Actress (Simone Baker), and an Audience Award at the 2017 Los Angeles Asian Pacific Film Festival. The film further won Golden Space Needle Awards for Best Director (2nd Place or 1st Runner-Up) (Justin Chon) and Best Actress (5th Place) (Simone Baker) at the 2017 Seattle International Film Festival.

His next movie Mrs Purple (2019) premiered at Sundance in the U.S. Dramatic Competition. It received positive reviews from critics.

He directed and co produced the first two episodes of Chief of War, a period drama miniseries for Apple TV+ starred and executively produced by Jason Momoa.

=== Other ventures ===
Chon co-owns a chain of clothing stores, named the Attic, in California.

In January 2015, he began uploading edited vlogs to his YouTube channel on a weekly basis. Since November 2015, he has uploaded edited vlogs to the channel on a daily basis. He also creates short comedy videos on YouTube with his friends, and has appeared in videos on Ryan Higa (nigahiga)'s YouTube channel. Chon is also a member of BgA (Boys Generally Asian), a parody K-Pop group formed by Higa. The five-member group has released two singles and has risen up many South Korean music charts as well as American music charts.

In 2016, Chon wrote an editorial for NBC about the racism he faced in Hollywood roles and auditions.

== Personal life ==
After dating for over a year, he married Sasha Egorova in October 2014. Their first child, a girl was born in December 2017. Their second child, a boy was born June 2023.

== Filmography ==
=== Film ===
Year	Title	Role	Notes/Ref.
2006	Puff, Puff, Pass	Bobbi	
2006	Fleetwood	Rong	
2007	Hack!	Ricky	
2008	Twilight	Eric Yorkie	
2009	Ashley Mason	Morgan	
2009	Crossing Over	Yong Kim	
2009	Turbo	Hugo Park	
2009	The Twilight Saga: New Moon	Eric Yorkie	
2010	The Twilight Saga: Eclipse	Eric Yorkie	
2011	From the Rough	Ji-Kyung	
2011	The Twilight Saga: Breaking Dawn – Part 1	Eric Yorkie	
2012	Detention of the Dead	Ash	
2012	Rock Jocks	Seth	
2012	Hang Loose	BJ	
2013	21 & Over	Jeff Chang	
2013	Innocent Blood	Brad Lee	
2014	Revenge of the Green Dragons	Sonny	
2015	Seoul Searching	Sid Park	
2015	Man Up	Randall	Also director, writer, executive producer
2016	Satanic	Seth	
2016	Heartbeats	Jae Juarez	
2016	Like Lambs	Jasper	
2017	Gook	Eli	Also director
2017	Dead Trigger	Daniel Chen	
2018	High Resolution	Paul Chen	
2019	Coming Home Again	Changrae	
2021	Blue Bayou	Antonio LeBlanc	Also writer and director

=== Directorial work ===
Year	Title	Role	Notes
2013	You're Stoopid	Director, writer	Short film
2013	Full Circle	Director, writer, actor	Short film
2015	90 Day Visa	Director, writer, actor	Short film
2015	Man Up	Director, writer, actor, executive producer	Feature film
2017	Gook	Director, writer, actor, executive producer	Feature film
2019	Ms. Purple	Director, writer, producer	Feature film
2021	Blue Bayou	Director, writer, actor	Feature film
2022	Pachinko	Director	TV series; 4 episodes
2023	Jamojaya	Director, writer	Feature film
2025	Chief of War	Director	TV series; 2 episodes

=== Television ===
Year	Title	Role	Notes
2005	Jack & Bobby	Greek Chorus	Episode: "Under the Influence"
2006	The O.C.	Big Korea	Episode: "The Party Favor"
2006	Wendy Wu: Homecoming Warrior	Peter Wu	Television film
2007–2008	Just Jordan	Tony Lee	30 episodes
2009	Balls Out: Gary the Tennis Coach	Joe Chang	Television film
2011	House	Harold Lam	Episode: "The Dig"
2013	New Girl	Brian	Episode: "Menus"
2015	Sin City Saints	Byron Summers	8 episodes
2016-2021	Dramaworld	Seth Ko	Main role, 19 episodes
2016–2017	Dr. Ken	Jae	5 episodes
2018	Deception	Jordan Kwon	13 episodes
2021	The Casagrandes	Yoon Kwan	Voice role; 3 episodes

=== Accolades ===
Year	Award	Category	Nominee(s)	Result	Ref.
2022	Peabody Awards	Entertainment	Pachinko	Won	
