= Ikuno-ku =

Ward of Osaka, Japan

Coordinates: 34°39′10″N 135°32′22″E

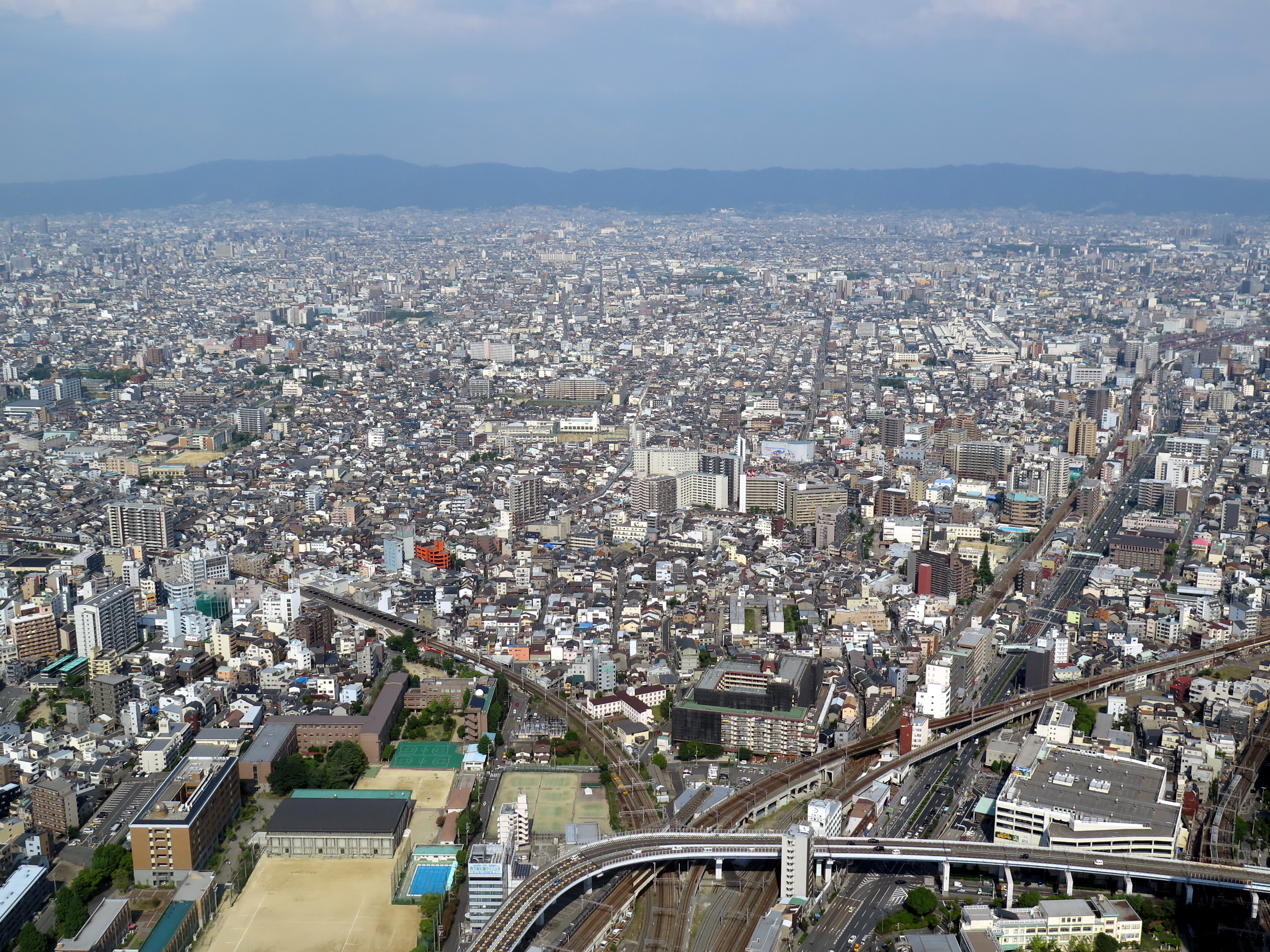
Ikuno-ku (2014)

Ikuno Korea Town

Location of Ikuno-ku in Osaka City

Ikuno-ku (生野区) is one of the 24 wards residing in the prefecture of Osaka, Japan.

It is well known for the Ikuno Korea Town in the Tsuruhashi (鶴橋) area. The area has historically had a large number of Korean people, particularly Korean Japanese citizens (Zainichi Korean) living there, as well as for its large number of yakiniku (Korean-style barbecue) restaurants. Many families from Korea have lived in the Tsuruhashi district for three generations or more. Ikuno-ku is located in the southeastern part of Osaka City and is adjacent to Higashiosaka City in the east, Higashinari-ku of Osaka City in the north, Tennoji-ku in the west, and Abeno-ku, Higashisumiyoshi-ku and Hirano-ku in the south.

== Population ==
The population and density of Ikuno-ku are the sixth largest in Osaka City, but are declining. The number of foreigner registrations is the largest in the city, and as of 2024, about 20% of the residents here are of foreign nationalities. The proportion of senior citizens is also higher than the overall Osaka City average.

As aging of the population progresses in Ikuno-ku, diverse services and assistances are being provided for senior citizens. The municipal home nursing service center, Okachiyama, is among them.

- Foreigners in Ikuno-ku, Osaka
- Nationality: Population (2021)
South Korea	20,460
China	2,842
Vietnam	2,892
Others	1,323

== Living ==
Ikuno-ku is a typical town of small businesses from the pre-World War II period. Although the dense concentration of houses, factories, and shops along narrow streets could pose a fire hazard, traditionally close human relationships contribute to an active local community. The narrow streets require substantial redevelopment. The completion of the Expressway Namba-Katae Line is eagerly awaited, as there are few east–west avenues.

Inside Ikuno-ku run JR Loop Line, Kintetsu Nara and Osaka Lines, as well as Subway Sennichimae Line, but none of them go through central Ikuno. The extension of Subway No.8 Line is strongly desired to provide the district citizens with railway transportation for everyday life.

Many projects are currently underway to develop the district into a comfortable residential area well balanced with its commercial and industrial functions. In southern Ikuno new apartment houses are being built for original residents, as well as many town squares. Construction of urban roads and parks is also planned. Residents of the Tsuruhashi area organized the New Town Development Committee, which was followed by the establishment of the New Tsuruhashi Redevelopment Association, both serving as a stimulus for residents-oriented town development.

== Education ==
Technical Junior College University of Osaka Prefecture was formerly in Ikuno-ku.

High schools operated by the Osaka Prefectural Board of Education:

- Ikuno Technical High School
- Momodani High School
- Wakaba High School

Private schools:

- Kaisei Gakuen High School
- Konko Toin High School
- Poole Gakuin Junior and Senior High School

Combined municipal elementary and junior high schools include:

- Tashima Minami Elementary and Tashima Junior High School (田島南小学校・田島中学校)

Municipal junior high schools include:

- Higashi Ikuni Junior High School (東生野中学校)
- Momodani Junior High School (桃谷中学校)
- Oike Junior High School (大池中学校)
- Shin Ikuno Junior High School (新生野中学校)
- Shin Tatsumi Junior High School (新巽中学校)
- Tatsumi Junior High School (巽中学校)

Municipal elementary schools include:

- Higashi Momodani (東桃谷小学校)
- Higashi Nakagawa (東中川小学校)
- Higashi Shoji (東小路小学校)
- Katsuyama (勝山小学校)
- Kita Tatsumi (北巽小学校)
- Kita Tsuruhashi (北鶴橋小学校)
- Oike (大池小学校)
- Shoji (小路小学校)
- Tatsumi (巽小学校)
- Tatsumi Higashi (巽東小学校)
- Tatsumi Minami (巽南小学校)
- Tsuruhashi (鶴橋小学校)

North Korean schools include:

- East Osaka Korean Middle School (東大阪朝鮮中級学校)
- Ikuno Korean Elementary School (生野朝鮮初級学校)
- Osaka Korean No. 4 Elementary School (大阪朝鮮第四初級学校)

In one daycare center, Ikuno Komorebi Hoikuen (生野こもれび保育園), about 50% of the students have Vietnamese citizenship and/or ethnic backgrounds in Vietnam. As of 2024 the school has extra Japanese study periods and serves pho for lunch on occasion.

== Transport ==
=== Rail ===
- West Japan Railway Company (These stations are located in Tennoji-ku but close to Ikuno-ku.)
  - Osaka Loop Line: Teradachō Station – Momodani Station – Tsuruhashi Station
- Kintetsu Railway
  - Osaka Line and Nara Line: Tsuruhashi Station – Imazato Station
- Osaka Metro
  - Sennichimae Line: Shōji Station – Kita-Tatsumi Station – Minami-Tatsumi Station

=== Road ===
- Katsuyama dori
- Imazatosuji
- National Route 25
- Uchi-kanjosen (National Route 479)

== Notable people ==
- Akiko Wada, Zainichi Korean singer and TV personality (Real Name: Kim Bokja, Hangul: 김복자)
- Hidekazu Mitsuyama, Japanese former baseball player
- Isao Taniguchi, Japanese former footballer
- Kawai Okada, Japanese former actress and businesswoman
- Kazuo Kitagawa, Japanese politician and former Minister of Agriculture, Forestry and Fisheries in the Japanese Cabinet of Junichiro Koizumi
- Keigo Higashino, Japanese mystery author
- Kenyu Sugimoto, Japanese footballer
- Ko Yong-hui, mother of North Korea's Supreme Commander, Kim Jong-un
- KONAN, Japanese singer, tarento, and gravure idol
- Tsuyoshi Ihara, Zainichi Korean actor, martial artist, and writer (Real Name: Yun Yu-gu, Hangul: 윤유구, Yun Yu-gu) - Originally from Kitakyushu, Fukuoka, Japan
- Zeus, Zainichi Korean professional wrestler and bodybuilder (Japanese Real Name: Kensho Obayashi, Nihongo: 大林 賢将, Ōbayashi Kenshō/Korean Real Name: Kim Bon-u, Hangul: 김본우, Gim Bon-u)

== See also ==
- Shin-Ōkubo
