= RisingOn =

MMA promoter based in Japan

Versus.Co., Ltd. 株式会社ヴァーサス (in Japanese)
- Company type: Private
- Industry: Mixed martial arts promotion
- Founded: 2005
- Founder: Atsushi Tanabe
- Headquarters: Matsubara, Osaka, Japan
- Key people: Atsushi Tanabe
- Website: rising-on.com

RisingOn (ライジングオン) is a mixed martial arts organization promoted by Versus.Co., Ltd., a Japanese private company. Atsushi Tanabe serves as the manager of Versus. Events are generally held in the Kansai (West Japan) area.

== History ==
=== Powergate ===
Versus.Co., Ltd. was established in 2005 to find talented fighters in the West Japan area (Kansai). They held their first event, "POWERGATE The Unknowns Strike Back", on June 19, 2005 at Flamingo the Arusha in Osaka.

Since September 2006, some events featured the use of a hexagonal cage, as well as prohibiting strikes to the head of a downed opponent. Additionally, kickboxing matches were also featured.

=== Kaiser championships ===
In 2008, Versus.Co., Ltd. announced that they would hold tournaments to sanction the first champions at lightweight (70 kg) and middleweight (83 kg). The tournament was named the "Kaiser Grand Prix", and champions were called "Kaiser" in reference to the German word for emperor. On April 13 and June 22, Keisuke Sakai and Zenta Yamazaki won the middleweight and lightweight tournaments to become the inaugural champions in their respective divisions.

On March 17, 2007, Versus.Co., Ltd. announced that they would promote the featherweight tournament to sanction the first champion at 65 kg. On August 25, Daikai Ozaki won the tournament to become the first featherweight champion. Ozaki defended his title 4 times and retained it until PowerGate closed.

In December 2009, Versus.Co., Ltd announced to finish the series of PowerGate events and to start the new event series. It was named "RisingOn", and the first event was held on December 29, 2009. From this event, the octagon cage is used. Hiroshi Shiba who won the lightweight title on June 28, 2009 and Daikai Ozaki who won the featherweight title on August 25, 2007 were sanctioned as the first champion of RisingOn.

On August 8, 2010, Hiroki Tanaka became the first champion of RisingOn at welterweight, and from Soo-Chol Kim from South Korea became the third champion at featherweight as the first non-Japanese fighter.

== List of events ==
=== PowerGate ===
No.	Event	Date	Venue	Location
34	Battle Code #1	December 13, 2009	Asunal Hall	Naka-ku, Nagoya, Aichi, Japan
33	Next Generation	September 23, 2009	Takaishi Appla Hall	Takaishi, Osaka, Osaka, Japan
32	POWERSTYLE presents POWERGATE	June 28, 2009	International House, Osaka	Tennōji-ku, Osaka, Osaka, Japan
31	Octave	April 19, 2009	International House, Osaka	Tennōji-ku, Osaka, Osaka, Japan
30	PGW "SLASH" - POWERGATE WAKAYAMA	March 8, 2009	Prego	Shinsaikamachi, Wakayama, Wakayama, Japan
29	POWERGATE presents Gate Challenge Toyohashi	March 1, 2009	Club BaySide Toyohashi	Jinnoshindencho, Toyohashi, Aichi, Japan
28	Overcoming 2009 vol.2 Hiroshima Fight Night	February 11, 2009	Hiroshima Industrial Hall	Minami-ku, Hiroshima, Hiroshima, Japan
27	Overcoming 2009 vol.1 POWERGATE CRASH	February 1, 2009	Sekai Kan	Minato-ku, Osaka, Osaka, Japan
26	SURVIVE!	December 7, 2008	Sumiyoshi Ward Residential Center	Sumiyoshi-ku, Osaka, Osaka, Japan
25	Gate Challenge in Nagoya	November 23, 2008	Koubudo 3F Tiger Hall	Naka-ku, Nagoya, Aichi, Japan
24	PARADIGM SHIFT	November 1, 2008	Abeno Ward Residential Center	Abeno-ku, Osaka, Osaka, Japan
23	Kaiser Grand Prix Title Match in Big Rose	September 28, 2008	Big Rose	Fukuyama, Hiroshima, Japan
22	POWERGATE 2DAYS DAYBRAKE in Azalea Taisho	August 17, 2008	Azalea Taisho	Taisho-ku, Osaka, Osaka, Japan
21	POWERGATE 2DAYS DAYBRAKE in Kyoto KBS Hall	August 10, 2008	Kyoto KBS Hall	Kamigyō-ku, Kyoto, Kyoto, Japan
20	POWERGATE Kaiser Grand Prix Final	June 22, 2008	Kyoto KBS Hall	Kamigyō-ku, Kyoto, Kyoto, Japan
19	POWER GATE Kaiser Grand Prix in Kyoto KBS Hall 2nd	April 13, 2008	Kyoto KBS Hall	Kamigyō-ku, Kyoto, Kyoto, Japan
18	POWER GATE Kaiser Grand Prix in Kyoto KBS Hall	February 3, 2008	Kyoto KBS Hall	Kamigyō-ku, Kyoto, Kyoto, Japan
17	POWERGATE Evolution in Zepp Osaka	October 28, 2007	Zepp Osaka	Suminoe-ku, Osaka, Osaka, Japan
16	POWERGATE Kaiser Grand Prix Final in Zepp Osaka	August 25, 2007	Zepp Osaka	Suminoe-ku, Osaka, Osaka, Japan
15	POWERGATE 15 Kaiser Grand Prix 2nd in Kyoto KBS Hall	June 17, 2007	Kyoto KBS Hall	Kamigyō-ku, Kyoto, Kyoto, Japan
14	POWERGATE 14 Kaiser Grand Prix	April 8, 2007	Osaka Central Public Hall	Kita-ku, Osaka, Osaka, Japan
13	POWERGATE 13 Next Gate in Flamingo the Arusha	February 18, 2007	Flamingo the Arusha	Naniwa-ku, Osaka, Osaka, Japan
12	POWERGATE 12 Burning Christmas in Flamingo the Arusha	December 17, 2006	Flamingo the Arusha	Naniwa-ku, Osaka, Osaka, Japan
11	POWERGATE 11 Return in Flamingo the Arusha	October 29, 2006	Flamingo the Arusha	Naniwa-ku, Osaka, Osaka, Japan
10	POWERGATE 10 Hexagon Ring in Kyoto KBS Hall	September 10, 2006	Kyoto KBS Hall	Kamigyō-ku, Kyoto, Kyoto, Japan
9	POWERGATE 9 Fighting Gion Festival in Site Kobe	July 23, 2006	Site Kobe	Nagata-ku, Kobe, Hyogo, Japan
8	POWERGATE 8 Fighting Gion Festival in Bizen Galerie	June 25, 2006	Bizen Galerie	Sakyō-ku, Kyoto, Kyoto, Japan
7	POWERGATE 7 Tour in Community Plaza Hirano	May 7, 2006	Community Plaza Hirano	Hirano-ku, Osaka, Osaka, Japan
6	POWERGATE 6 Tour in Kobe Shushinkan Brewery Hall	March 5, 2006	Kobe Shushinkan Brewery Hall	Higashinada-ku, Kobe, Hyogo, Japan
5	POWERGATE 5 Tour in Black Chamber	January 29, 2006	Black Chamber	Suminoe-ku, Osaka, Osaka, Japan
4	POWERGATE 4 Tour in Azalea Taisho	December 10, 2005	Azalea Taisho	Taisho-ku, Osaka, Osaka, Japan
3	POWERGATE 3 The Descent of The Fighting God	October 30, 2005	Flamingo the Arusha	Naniwa-ku, Osaka, Osaka, Japan
2	POWERGATE 2 War cry of The Spirits	August 27, 2005	Flamingo the Arusha	Naniwa-ku, Osaka, Osaka, Japan
1	POWERGATE 1 The Unknowns Strike Back	June 19, 2005	Flamingo the Arusha	Naniwa-ku, Osaka, Osaka, Japan

No.	Event	Date	Venue	Location
14	Rising On 13 -Change for Change-	September 23, 2012	Azalea Taisho Hall	Osaka, Japan
13	Rising On 12 -The Moment of the Moment-	June 17, 2012	Azalea Taisho Hall	Osaka, Japan
12	Rising On Kyushu	May 20, 2012	Taragi	Kumamoto, Japan
11	Rising On 11 -Road to Champion-	March 17, 2012	Azalea Taisho Hall	Osaka, Japan
10	Rising On 10 -2011 Bantamweight Tournament Final-	December 18, 2011	Naniwa Ward Community Center	Osaka, Japan
9	Rising On 9 -2011 Bantamweight Tournament Semifinals-	October 9, 2011	Naniwa Ward Community Center	Osaka, Japan
8	Rising On 8 -2011 Bantamweight Tournament Opening Round-	July 31, 2011	Naniwa Ward Community Center	Osaka, Japan
7	Rising On 7 -2011 Flyweight Tournament Final-	May 29, 2011	Naniwa Ward Community Center	Osaka, Japan
6	Rising On 6 -2011 Flyweight Tournament Semifinals-	April 3, 2011	Naniwa Ward Community Center	Osaka, Japan
5	Rising On 5	February 5, 2011	Naniwa Ward Community Center	Osaka, Japan
4	Rising On 4 -Return to the "Power gate spirit"-	November 21, 2010	Tnnnoji Ward Residential Center	Tennōji-ku, Osaka, Osaka, Japan
3	Rising On 3 -Stirring-	August 8, 2010	Takaishi Appla Hall	Takaishi, Osaka, Osaka, Japan
2	Rising On 2 -Kamikaze -	April 11, 2010	Takaishi Appla Hall	Takaishi, Osaka, Osaka, Japan
1	Rising On -Start-	December 29, 2009	Takaishi Appla Hall	Takaishi, Osaka, Osaka, Japan

== Weight division system and champions ==
=== PowerGate ===
PowerGate used its original weight division system as follows, but this is not used anymore. The champions were called "Kaiser".

#1

Weight Division	Weight	No.	Name of Champion	Nationality
Super heavyweight	Unlimited	-	-	-
Heavyweight	105 kg (231.5 lb)	-	-	-
Cruiserweight	95 kg (209.4 lb)	-	-	-
Light heavyweight	85 kg (187.4 lb)	-	-	-
Middleweight	80 kg (176.4 lb)	1st	Keisuke Sakai	Japan
Welterweight	75 kg (165.3 lb)	-	-	-
Lightweight	70 kg (154.3 lb)	2nd	Hiroshi Shiba	Japan
Featherweight	65 kg (143.3 lb)	1st	Daikai Ozaki	(Japan)
Bantamweight	60 kg (132.3 lb)	-	-	-

#2

Weight Division	Weight	No.	Name of Champion	Nationality
Heavyweight	Unlimited	-	Vacant	-
Cruiserweight	95 kg (209.4 lb)	-	Vacant	-
Middleweight	85 kg (187.4 lb)	-	Vacant	-
Welterweight	77 kg (169.8 lb)	1st	Hiroki "Goodman" Tanaka	Japan
Lightweight	70 kg (154.3 lb)	1st	Hiroshi Shiba	Japan
Featherweight	66 kg (145.5 lb)	3rd	Soo-Chol Kim	South Korea
Bantamweight	62 kg (136.7 lb)	-	Vacant	-
Flyweight	58 kg (127.9 lb)	1st	Hidenobu Izena	Japan

== Rules ==
=== PowerGate ===
==== Rounds ====
Bouts take 3 rounds and each round takes 3 minutes. Intervals of rounds take 1 minute.

==== Place ====
Bouts are done on the square ring which has sides of 4 meters or the hexagonal ring which has a diameter of 6 meters.

==== Attire ====
Fighters must wear tights, leggings, or kickboxing shorts. They can be both of short or long. No shoes.

==== Fouls ====
Passive actions, Headbutts, Elbow strikes, Knee strikes without knee-pads, Hitting to opponent's head on the ground position, Stomping, Buster, Knee strikes to the opponents on the ground.

==== Rounds ====
A bout take 2 rounds and each round takes 5 minutes, but championships take 3 rounds.

==== Place ====
Bout are done in the octagon cage.

==== Attire ====
Fighters must wear short tights, short leggings or kickboxing shorts.

==== Fouls ====
Passive actions, Headbutts, Elbow strikes, Knee strikes without knee-pads, Hitting to opponent's head on the ground position, Stomping, Buster, Knee strikes to the opponents on the ground.
