= Ikuno Korea Town =

Shopping area in Osaka, Japan

Ikuno Korea Town 生野コリアタウン
- Neighborhood
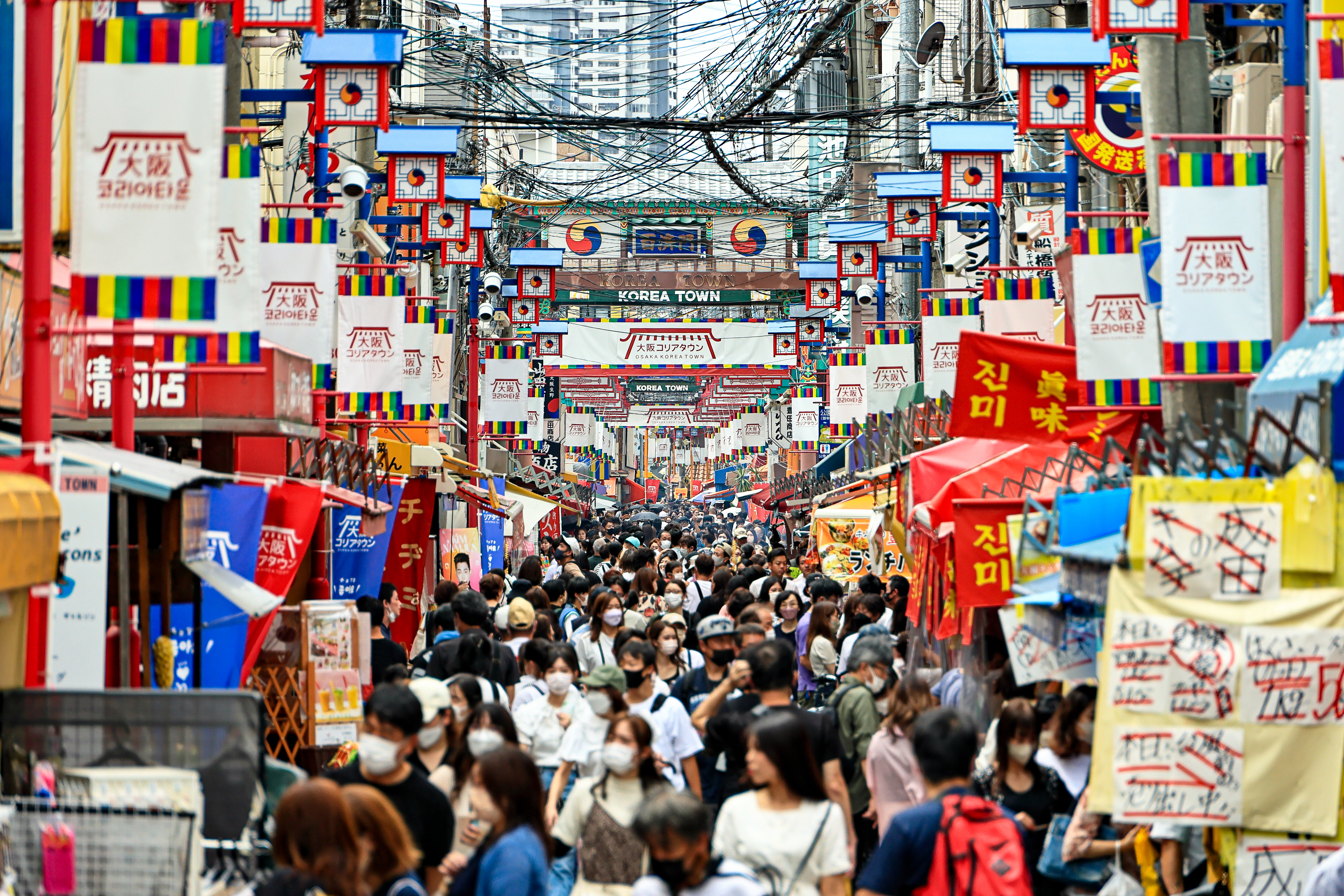
- Miyuki-dori, the main shopping street (2022)
- Interactive map of Ikuno Korea Town
- Coordinates: 34.66046°N 135.53446°E
- Country: Japan
- City: Osaka
- Ward: Ikuno
- Website: ikuno-koreatown.com (in Japanese)

Ikuno Korea Town (Japanese: 生野コリアタウン; Korean: 이쿠노 코리아타운) is a Koreatown in Ikuno-ku, Osaka, Japan. It is one of the largest Koreatowns in the country and a significant tourist attraction, with around two million visitors in 2021.

The area has previously gone by a number of names, although its current name is the name the town's organization prefers. Other names include Tsuruhashi Korea Town (鶴橋コリアンタウン; 츠루하시 코리아타운), Osaka Korea Town, Ikaino Korea Town (after the Ikaino area), and Momodani Korea Town (桃谷コリアタウン; 모모다니 코리아타운).

It is a ten-minute walk from either of the Tsuruhashi and Momodani Stations. Between 10 a.m. to 6 p.m. the main shopping street is a pedestrian-only zone. Nearby is the Osaka Korea Town Museum, which discusses the history of the area and showcases Korean culture.

== Description ==
According to a 2020 census, 27,600 or 21.8% of Ikuno-ku's population are foreign nationals. This makes Ikuno the ward with the highest number of foreigners in Japan. The area contains around 150 Korean stores and restaurants. Businesses also sell Korean clothing, souvenirs, cosmetics, and goods related to Korean dramas and K-pop. Korean street foods like tteokbboki (spicy rice cakes) and gimbap (similar to sushi rolls except often without fish) are sold along the various streets. Twenty of the 150 stores specifically sell kimchi (Korean fermented cabbage). There are also Korean barbecue restaurants. Various places in the area offer classes in the Korean language, culture, and cooking.

As many of the Korean merchants descend from immigrants from Jeju Island, some of the food sold is influenced by styles of that region. There are also some unique local variants of Korean dishes, such as tomato kimchi.

The area has become very popular, especially with young women. In 2021, around two million people visited the area. Around 80% of them were female, with half of them being under the age of 30.

The area has been compared to the Ōkubo Koreatown in Tokyo, which Lee Young-hee of the JoongAng Ilbo describes as having "big shopping malls with famous Korean franchise stores". Some restaurants there represent the latest food trends in South Korea. By contrast, Ikuno "bears the traditional Korean marketplace feel", with homemade food, narrow streets, and merchandise prominently displayed for passersby.

== History ==
Miyuki-dori, now the main shopping street of the district, has hosted Korean merchants since the Japanese occupation of Korea. Around the 1920s, Koreans, particularly from Jeju Island, moved into the area.

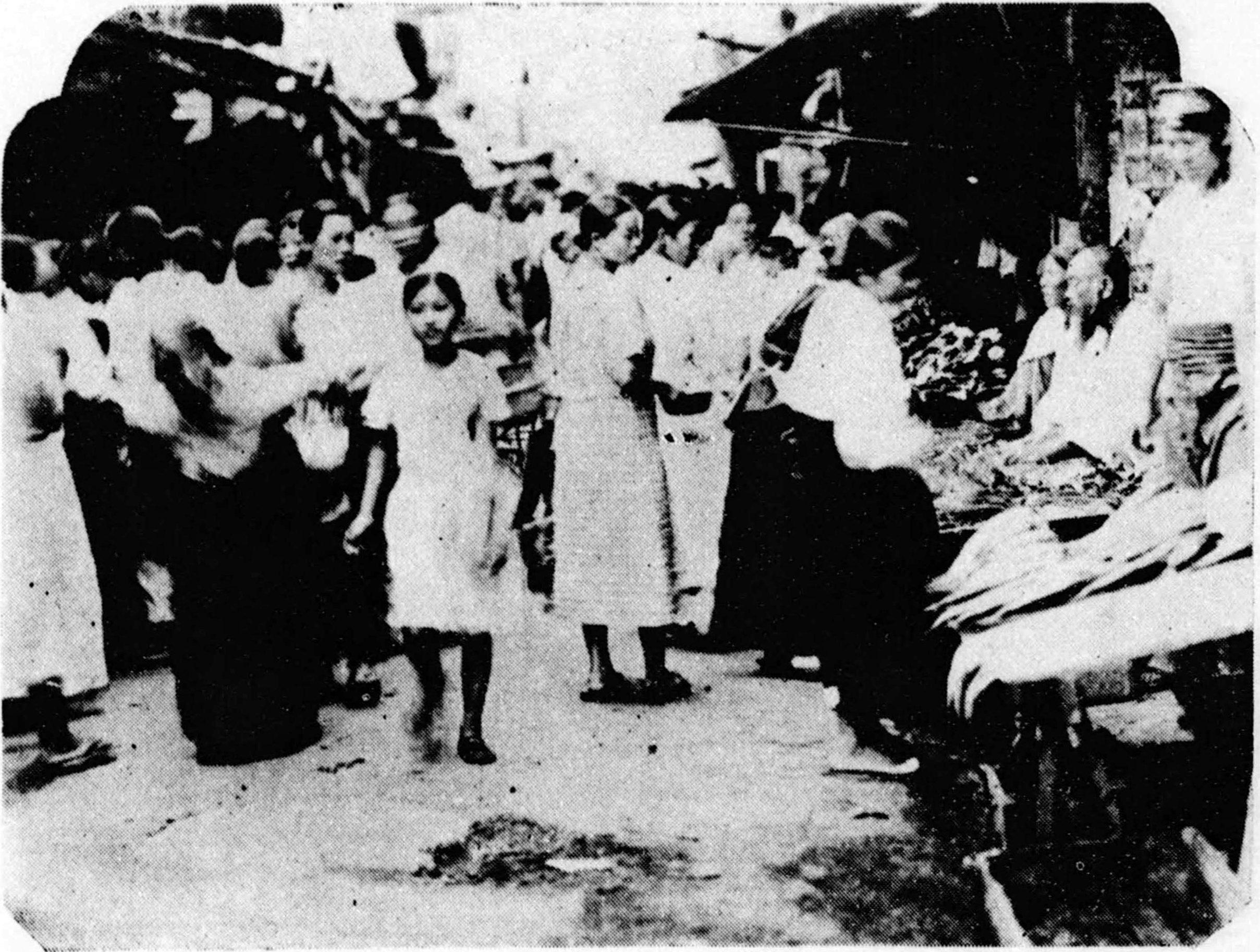
Koreans in Osaka, depicted in a book from 1938 by Zainichi Korean author Go Gweon-sam

Beginning in 1939, millions of Koreans were mobilized to support Japan in World War II, with hundreds of thousands being forced to move to Japan to perform labor in extremely poor conditions. After Korea was liberated in 1945, around 600,000 remained in Japan for various reasons, namely to avoid the poverty and instability that resulted from the division of Korea and the subsequent Korean War. Around this time, Korean-owned businesses increased in density in the area, until the area became largely associated with the Korean community. Since then, both Korean and Japanese people have regularly visited the town to buy Korean food.

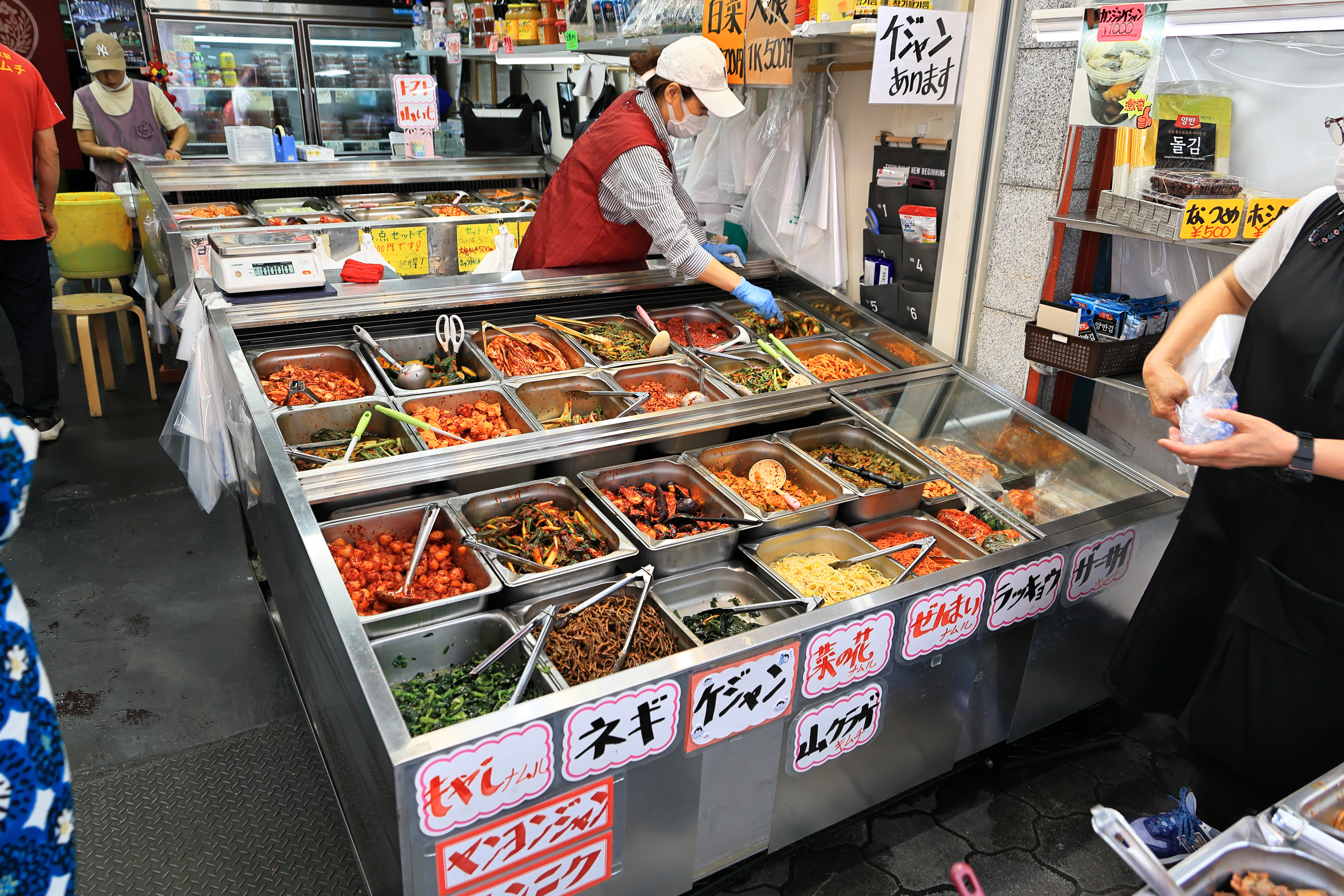
Various Korean banchan (side dishes) being sold in the market (2022)

Korean food in the area is not always considered "authentic"; this is in part intentional and due to the history of the area. After World War II, Koreans had their Japanese citizenships stripped by the 1947 Alien Registration Ordinance. This prevented them from receiving food rations in a time when food was scarce and poverty amongst Koreans was significant. Dishes were often improvised by necessity; Zainichis often substituted in unorthodox ingredients to which they had access.

Since 1951, three shopkeeper associations have managed stores in the area. They made numerous attempts to merge for several decades, but talks stalled due to "the different characteristics of the shops and stubbornness of the vendors", according to Hong Sung-ik, who was the chair of the market by 2022. In 1993, they repaved the roads and added four traditional Korean gates at various entrances to the area.

After the growth of the Korean Wave and the joint Korea–Japan hosting of the 2002 FIFA World Cup, the area experienced a boom in popularity and became a major tourist destination. However, businesses have sometimes seen drops in the number of visitors due to South Korea and Japan's turbulent diplomatic relationship.

In 2021, the three associations officially named the area "Osaka Ikuno Koreatown".

On April 29, 2023, the history museum Osaka Korea Town Museum was opened near the area. The museum discusses the history of the area, showcases Korean popular culture, and houses around 2,000 books on both Korea and Japan.

=== Anti-Korean sentiment ===
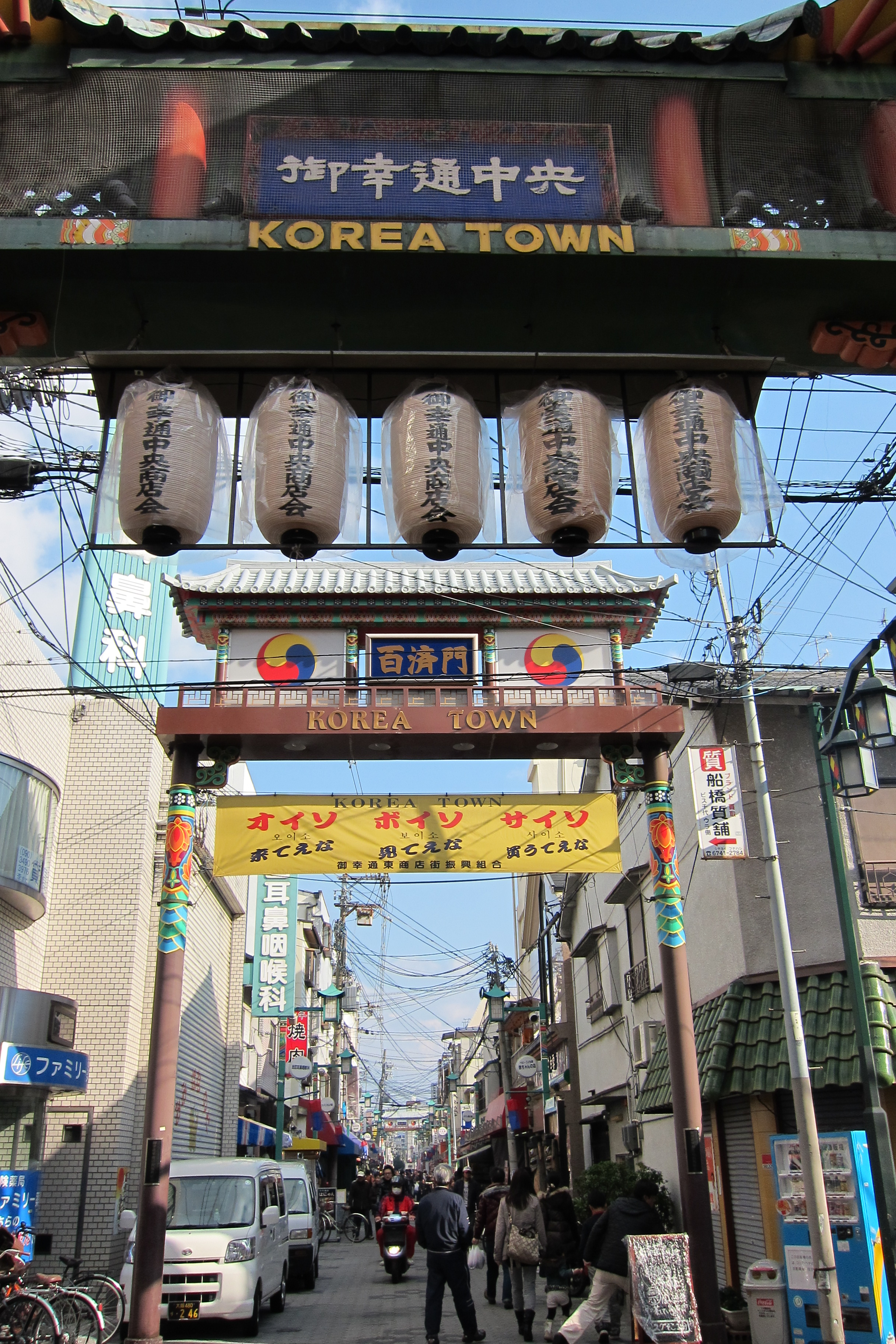
A gate to the town (2011)

The area has been viewed with hostility, particularly due to anti-Korean sentiment. One resident reported that he knew people who had stones thrown at them by Japanese people. One point of contention is the fact that Ko Yong-hui, the mother of North Korean leader Kim Jong Un, was born in the area in 1952.

In 2013, a video of a junior high school girl in the area shouting the need for an ethnic cleansing of the Korean residents there went viral. Police officers who were standing nearby did nothing to stop the girl in the video. She is reportedly the daughter of Katsurada Satoshi, who is a member of the far-right anti-Korean group Zaitokukai. Zaitokukai has held similar protests in Korean enclaves in Japan, including one in Ōkubo, Tokyo where they called for violence against Koreans.

== In popular culture ==
The area was the setting for the 2004 Japanese novel and film Blood and Bones, which covers the semi-autobiographical story of an ethnic Korean living there. Parts of the 2022 American TV series Pachinko, which is based on a 2017 novel of the same name, takes place in this area. It focuses on several generations of an ethnic Korean family.

== See also ==
- Ōkubo, Tokyo: Koreatown in Tokyo
- Amerikamura: An Americatown in Osaka
