= Yamanaka Aburaten =

Company in Kyoto city, Japan

- Native name: 株式会社山中油店
- Industry: Retail sale of oil products.
- Founded: Between 1818 and 1829 (established in 2003)
- Headquarters: Kamigyō-ku, Kyoto, Japan
- Website: http://www.yoil.co.jp/en/

Yamanaka Cooking Oil Co., Ltd. (山中油店 かぶしきがいしゃやまなかあぶらてん kabushiki-gaisha Yamanaka abura-ten) is a seller of oils, including food, cosmetic and construction related products, with approximately 200 years of history. Its headquarters are located in the Kamigyō-ku ward of Kyoto, Japan.

== History ==
The store was founded at its current location by Heibee Yamanaka, during the years of the Bunsei era (1818–1829) of the late Edo period. Since then, the business has continued to operate as an oil specialty store.

During its first years, the store sold mainly oil for lamps. After the Meiji period, oil lamp usage started to decline and cooking oil was introduced to Kyoto. As a result, the business began to expand its lineup of products.

As a corporation, it was established in the year 2003.

== Present Day ==
The company continues to operate as a specialty oil store. The company building is registered as a tangible cultural property and was designated as an important landscape structure by the city of Kyoto.
