= Sanbongi-dōri =

Street in Koyoto, Japan

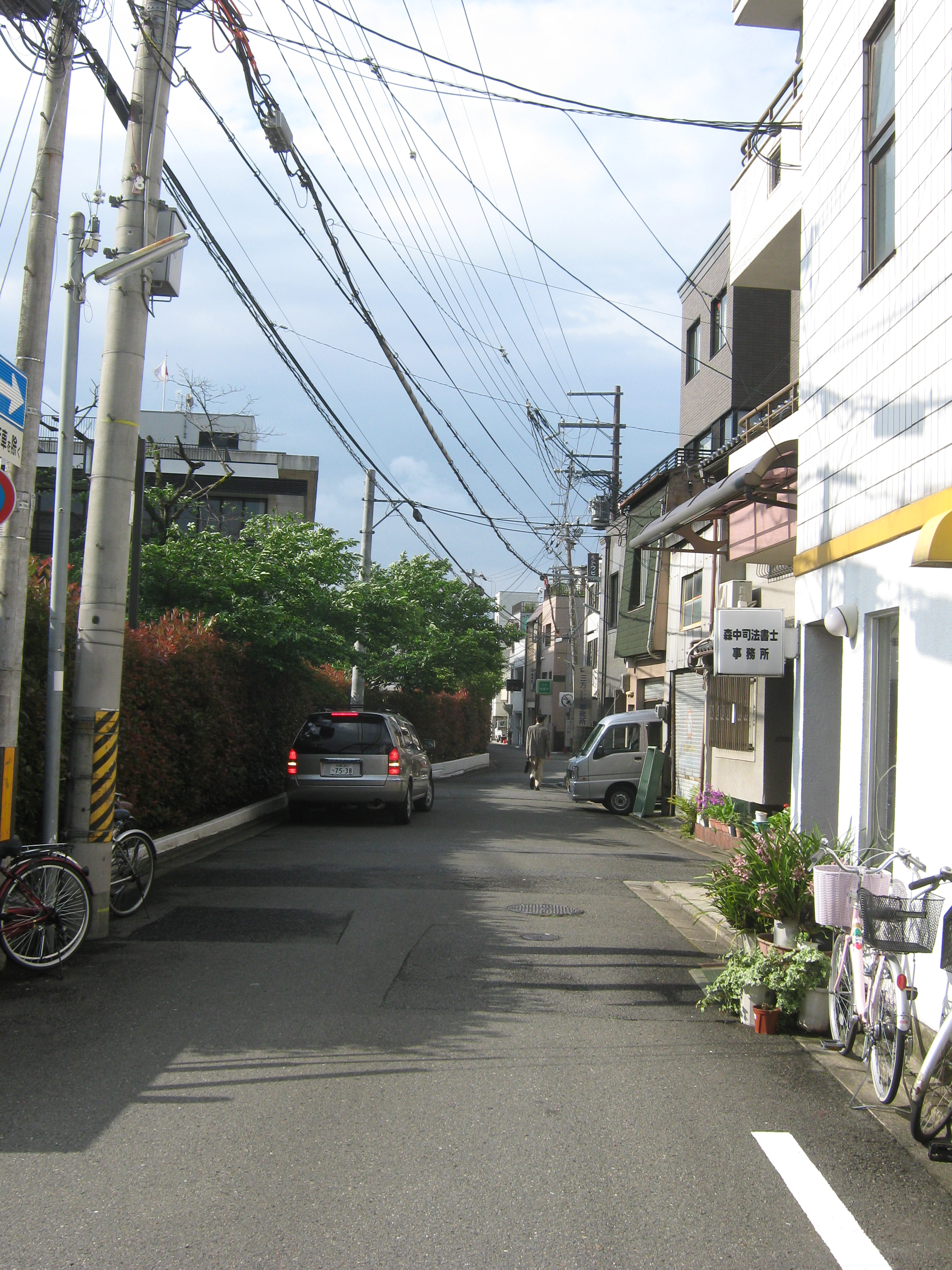
- Nishisanbongi seen southward from Kōjinguchi.
- Interactive map of Sanbongi-dōri
- Native name: 三本木通
- Coordinates: 35°01′10″N 135°46′12″E

Sanbongi-dōri (三本木通, Sanbongi-dōri) is a street in the central-eastern part of Kyoto, in the Kamigyō-ku ward. It begins at Kōjinguchi-dōri. The street splits into two roads, Nishisanbongi-dōri (西三本木通) to the west and Higashisanbongi-dōri (東三本木通) to the east, which eventually converge just before its end, Marutamachi-dōri.

== Geography ==
=== Location ===
Sanbongi-dōri is a short irregular street in the southeast of Kamigyō ward. It is located just west of the Imperial Palace Park and east of the Kamo River. It begins in the Kami'ikesu-chō (上生洲町) neighborhood and ends in the Tawaraya-chō (俵屋町) neighborhood. It also passes through the Kami-no-chō (上之町), Naka-no-chō (中之町), and Minami-chō (南町) neighborhoods. The street begins at Kōjinguchi-dōri (荒神口通), near the Kōjin Bridge (荒神橋) over the Kamo River, and ends at Marutamachi-dōri (丸太町通), one of the main east–west arteries of the city, at the Marutamachi Bridge (丸太町橋). The street splits into two after a distance of 175 meters from its start, with one branch turning east, the Higashisanbongi-dōri, while the western part, the Nishisanbongi-dōri, continues straight ahead. The streets reconnect in a horseshoe shape just 15 meters before Marutamachi-dōri. Sanbongi-dōri precedes Kawaramachi Street (河原町通) to the west and is the last street before the Kamo River, but it does not touch the river.

Traffic flows one-way from north to south, except on Higashisanbongi-dōri, where no direction is indicated. The street is approximately 450 meters long. The roadway actually extends slightly north of Kōjinguchi and slightly south of Marutamachi, and if these parts were counted, the street would be nearly 800 meters long.

=== Intersecting roads ===
From north to south, in one direction only. Roads encountered from the right are indicated by (d), while those encountered from the left are indicated by (g). Only named streets are listed.

Kōjinguchi-dōri (荒神口通) Marutamachi-dōri (丸太町通) Sources: Ritsumeikan Asia Pacific University (2023). "近代京都オーバーレイマップ". Art Research Center (in Japanese).

=== Public transport ===
Kyoto City Bus services do not directly pass through the street, but some stops are close due to its proximity to Kawaramachi-dōri. Nearby stops include Kōjin-guchi (荒神口, lines 3, 4, 17, 37, 59, and 205) and Kawaramachi Marutamachi (河原町丸太町, lines 3, 4, 10, 17, 37, 59, 65, 93, 202, 204, and 205).

The nearest Kyoto Metro station is south of the street, Kyōto Shiyakusho-mae (京都市役所前駅), on the Tōzai Line.

== Etymology ==
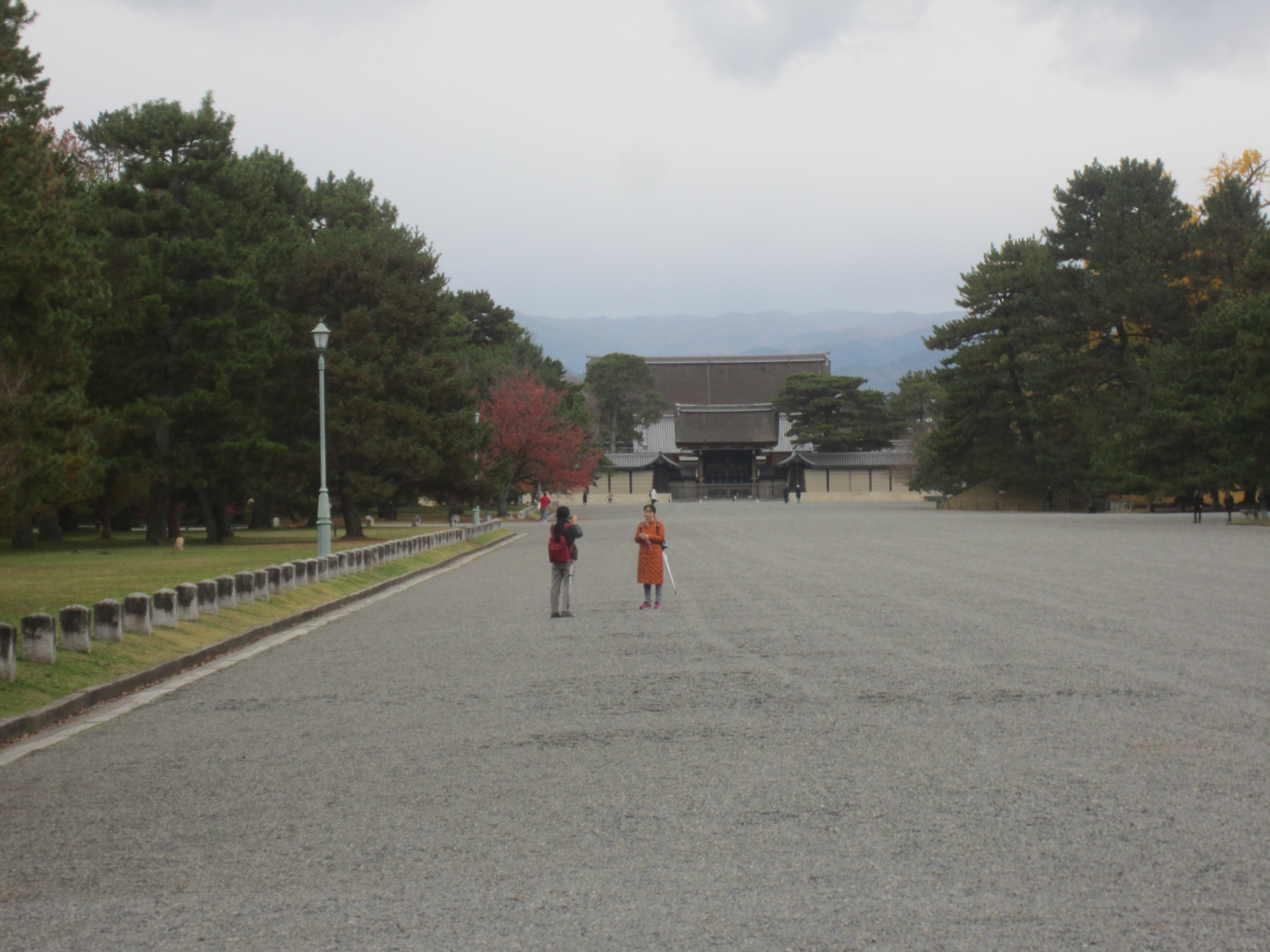
Inner compound of the Imperial Palace and its garden.

The street is named after Sanbongi/Sambongi (三本木), an area further west devastated during the 1708 fire. The area surrounding the street is also called Shinsanbongi (新三本木), meaning "new Sanbongi". The original Sanbongi neighborhood was located just next to the Imperial Palace but is now within the Imperial Palace Garden. Nishisanbongi (西三本木) means "West Sanbongi," while Higashisanbongi (東三本木) means "East Sanbongi."

== History ==
During the Heian period (794–1185), the street was outside the imperial city and did not yet exist. The area was part of the floodplains of the Kamo River. The neighborhood developed into a temple district, which was relocated during the Azuchi-Momoyama period (1573–1603) by Toyotomi Hideyoshi.

The street opened shortly after the Hōei fire (宝永の大火), which devastated the imperial quarter and the palace of the old capital in 1708. A residential area opened up between Kamichōjamachi-dōri and Marutamachi-dōri for the houses displaced by the expansion of the Kyoto Imperial Palace after the fire. As a result, many court nobles settled on the street, giving it the appearance of an imperial neighborhood. During the Bakumatsu period at the end of the Edo period (1603–1868), the street gained importance as several samurai and feudal lords passed through. Additionally, the street developed into a hanamachi, a type of entertainment district where geishas and tea houses were frequent, often visited by loyalists of the Tokugawa shogunate. Meeting places for loyalists included Yamatoya (or Yoshidaya), where in 1867 the assassination attempt on Kido Takayoshi, in favor of a return to monarchy and the abolition of the shogunate, took place. After the Meiji Restoration and the dissolution of the shogunate, the street lost its importance, and the entertainment district disappeared around 1872.

== Heritage and points of interest ==
Just north of the street, near Kōjinguchi and Hirokōji-dōri, is the Kyoto Prefectural University of Medicine.

In the northern part of the street, separated by Higashi and Nishi Sanbongi-dōri, in the small residential block, is the Jōdo Buddhist temple Entsū-ji (円通寺/圓通寺), surrounded by historical houses. Thus, several traditional townhouses and longhouses are on the street, which has retained a historical charm. However, the northern part of the street is more urban.

Just after the alley that joins Nishi and Higashi Sanbongi-dōri, on the east side of Higashisanbongi, is a stele marking the founding place of the Kyoto Hōsei School (京都法政学校), later becoming Ritsumeikan University. Next to this stele is another stele dedicated to a nearby, but demolished, location, the Yamatoya (大和屋) or Yoshidaya (吉田屋), the residence where the politician Kido Takayoshi (木戸 孝允, 1833–1877) was attacked by the Shinsengumi. Kido managed to escape using an underground passage in the Yoshidaya. Further south, still on Higashisanbongi, facing the Kamo River, is the Sanshisui Myōkō (山紫水明処), a historic site that once housed the studio of the painter Rai San'yō (頼山陽, 1781–1832). The site is designated a national monument because the painter died there, and the site was renowned for offering one of the best views of the region and Mount Hiei.

Interpretive panels along the Kamo River explain the area's history.

== Gallery ==
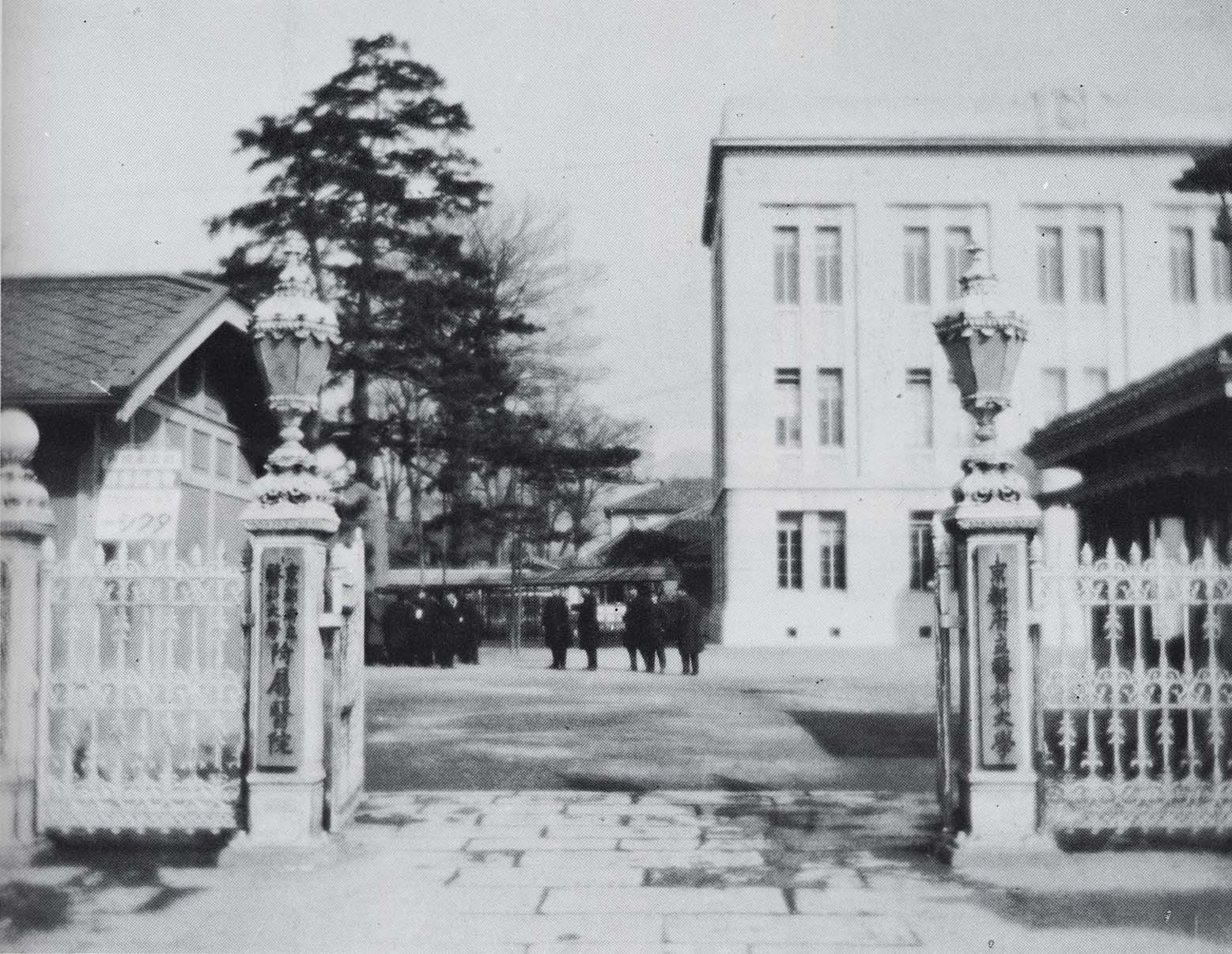
The Prefectural University of Medicine in the 20th century

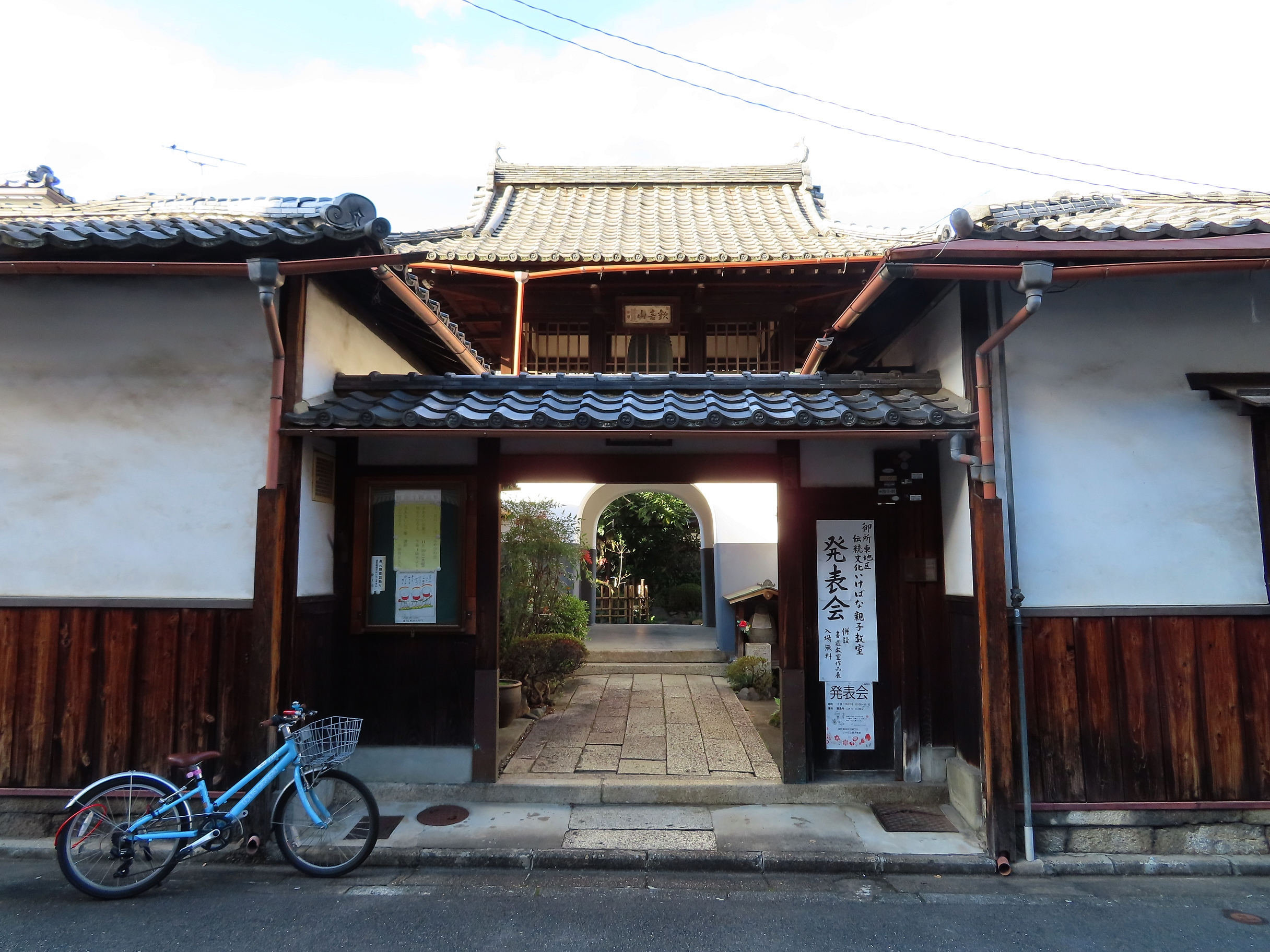
Entrance of the Entsū-ji

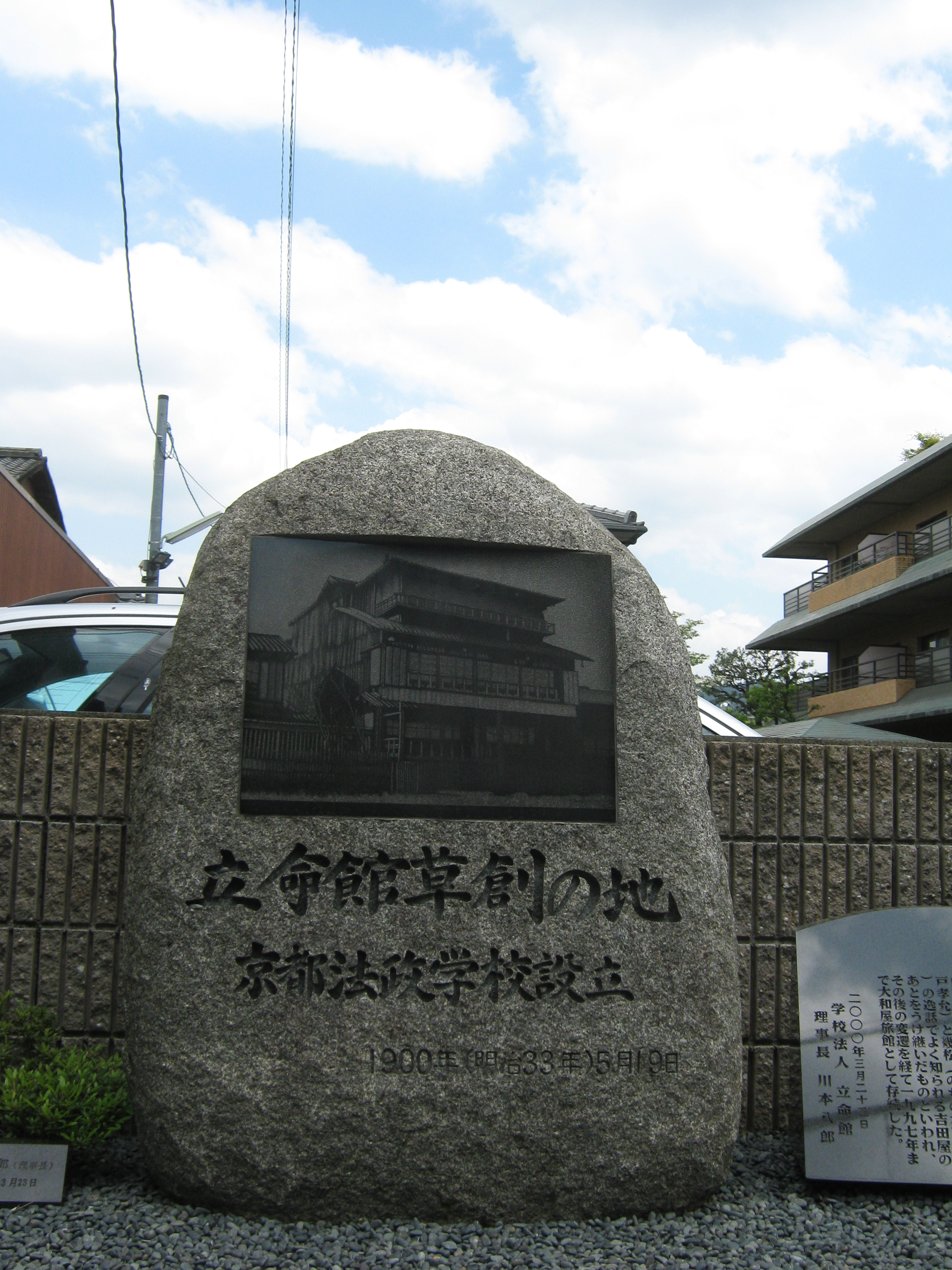
Ritsumeikan stele
