= Aigan =

Japanese retail outlet chain

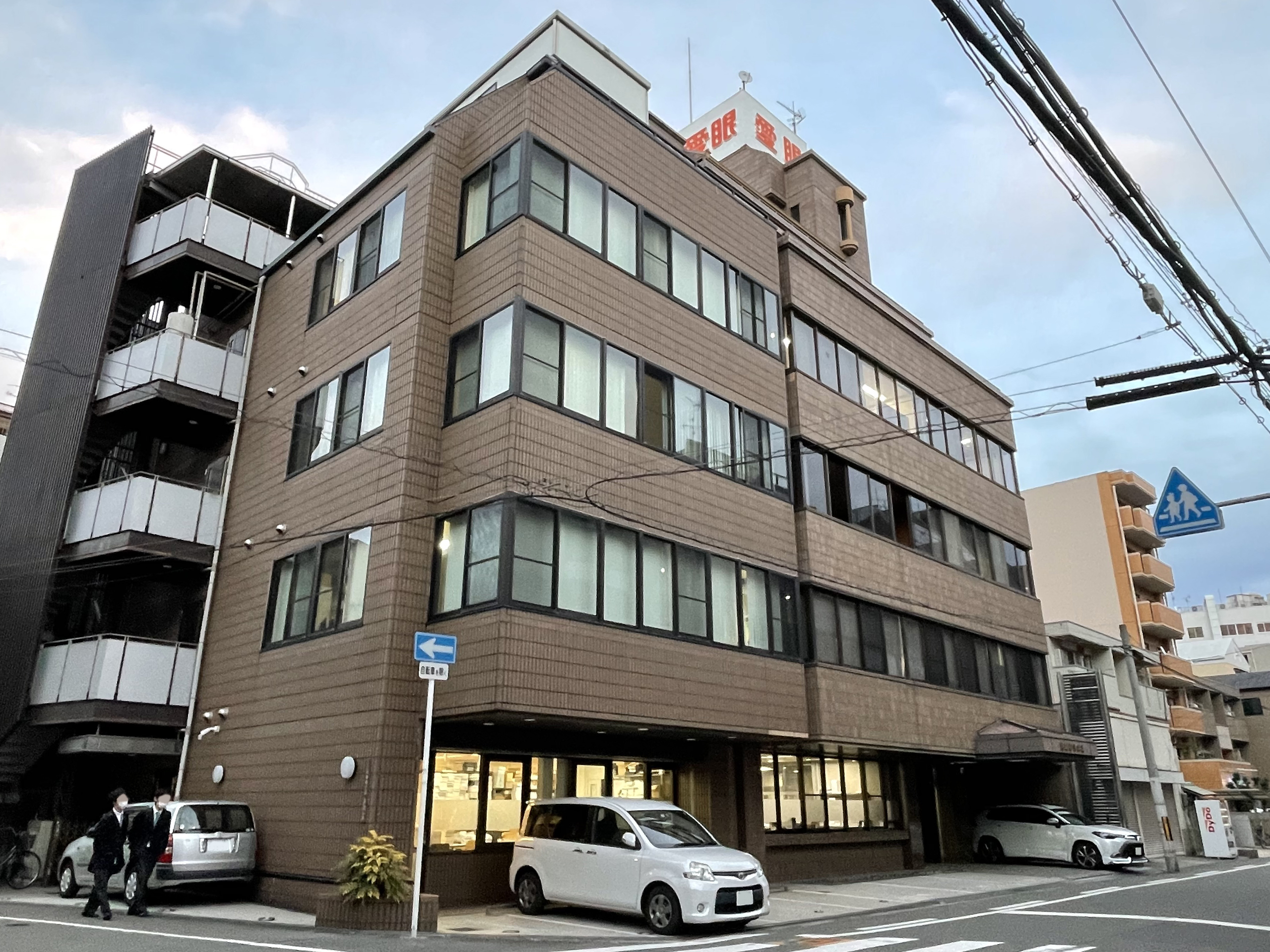
- Aigan headquarters
- Type: Kabushiki gaisha
- Founded: January 11, 1961; 65 years ago
- Headquarters: Tennōji-ku, Osaka, Japan
- Products: Glasses

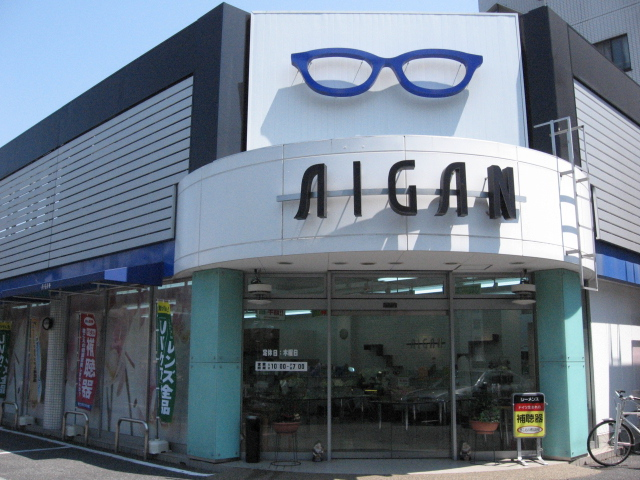
Aigan store in Nerima, Tokyo

Aigan Co., Ltd. (愛眼株式会社, Aigan Kabushiki gaisha) (TYO: 9854) is a Japanese retail outlet chain that sells glasses (spectacles). The company is headquartered in Tennōji-ku, Osaka, Osaka Prefecture.

== History ==
Aigan was founded in 1961.

Aigan opened its first store in China in 1994.

In 2012, Aigan launched a collection of officially licensed Star Wars glasses.

In 2022, Aigan announced it was liquidating its stores in China after recording losses for seven consecutive years.

== Description ==
Aigan has 223 stores (2022).

== See also ==
- Eyewear retailer
