= Osaka Prefecture University =

Public university in Japan

Coordinates: 34°32′52″N 135°30′27″E

- 大阪府立大学
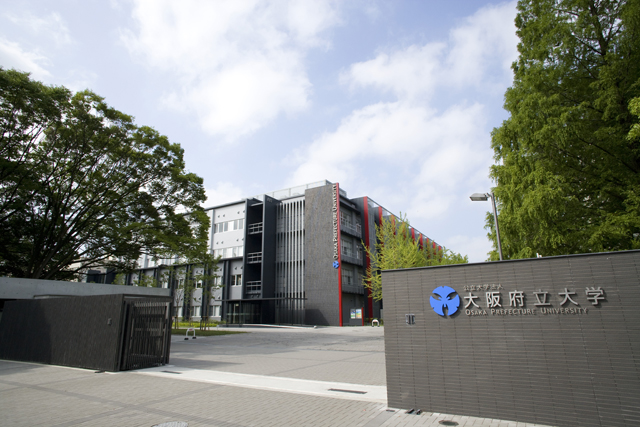
- Osaka Prefecture University
- Type: Public
- Active: 1883–2022
- President: Hiroshi Tsuji
- Faculty: 755 full-time
- Students: 7,959
- Undergraduates: 6,434
- Postgraduates: 1,525
- Location: Sakai, Osaka, Japan
- Campus: Suburb
- Colors: Ultramarine blue
- Website: www.osakafu-u.ac.jp

Osaka Prefecture University (大阪府立大学, Ōsaka furitsu daigaku) (OPU), also abbreviated to Fudai (府大), used to be one of the largest public universities in Japan. The university merged with Osaka City University to form Osaka Metropolitan University in April 2022.

== History ==
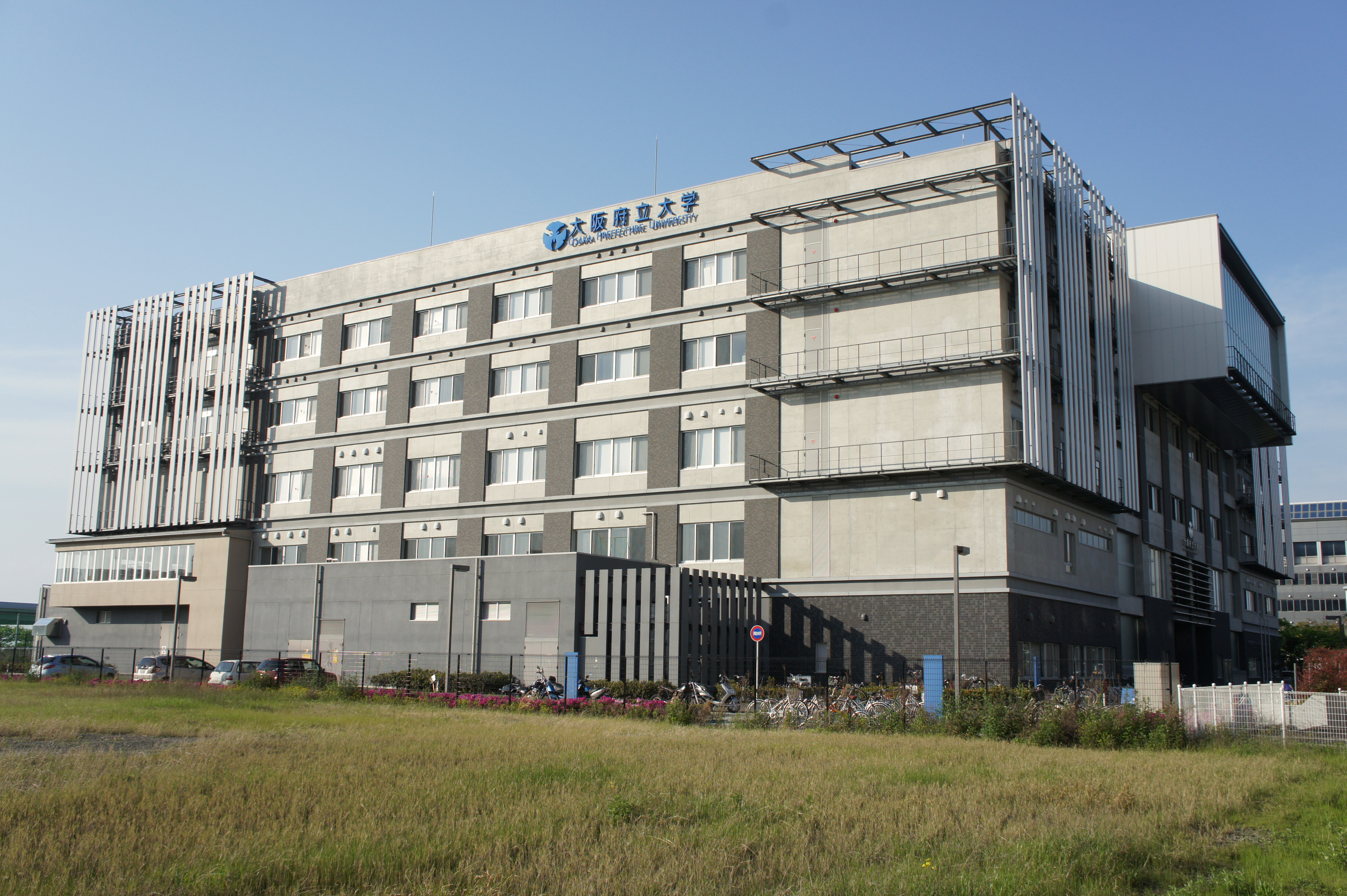
Rinku Campus

OPU was established in 2005 in its current form by integrating three prefectural universities: University of Osaka Prefecture (大阪府立大学), Osaka Women's University (大阪女子大学) and Osaka Prefecture College of Nursing (大阪府立看護大学).

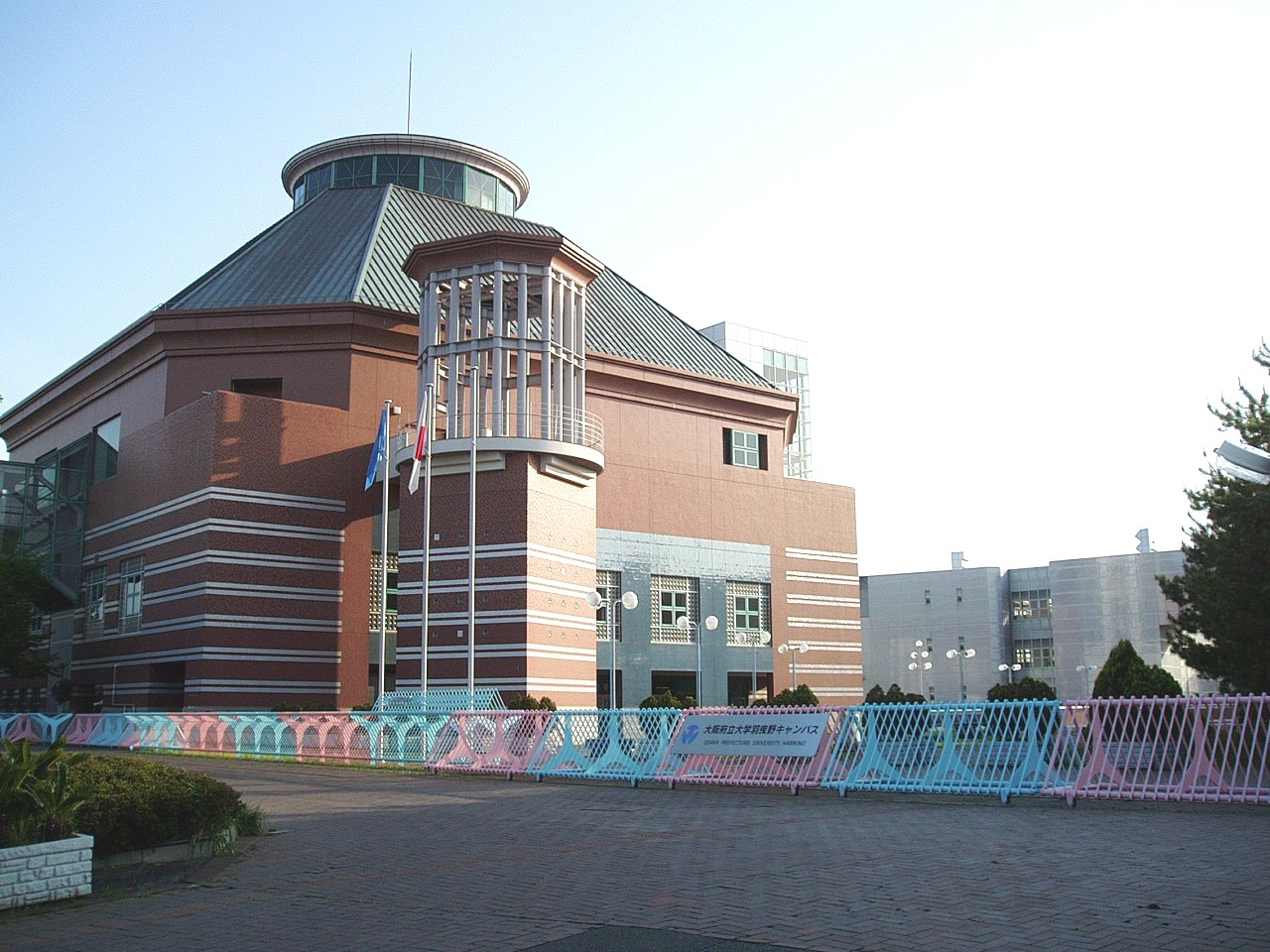
Main gate of Habikino Campus

In June 2020, OPU announced that it would be merging with Osaka City University to become the University of Osaka. However, after the name was announced on June 26, 2020, Osaka University President released a statement pointing out that the English version of the new university's name was "remarkably similar" to that of Osaka University, adding, "It will cause confusion among our students, and work as a great obstacle for the future of both universities, which are reaching out to the world."

=== University of Osaka Prefecture ===
UOP was originally established in 1949 as Naniwa University (浪速大学: Naniwa is the classical name for Osaka) by mingling several national and public technical colleges. Among them was Osaka National College of Engineering (官立大阪工業専門学校). Since then the faculties in the field of engineering have been very competitive. In 1955 the university was renamed University of Osaka Prefecture (Japanese name for the university has not been changed since 1955).

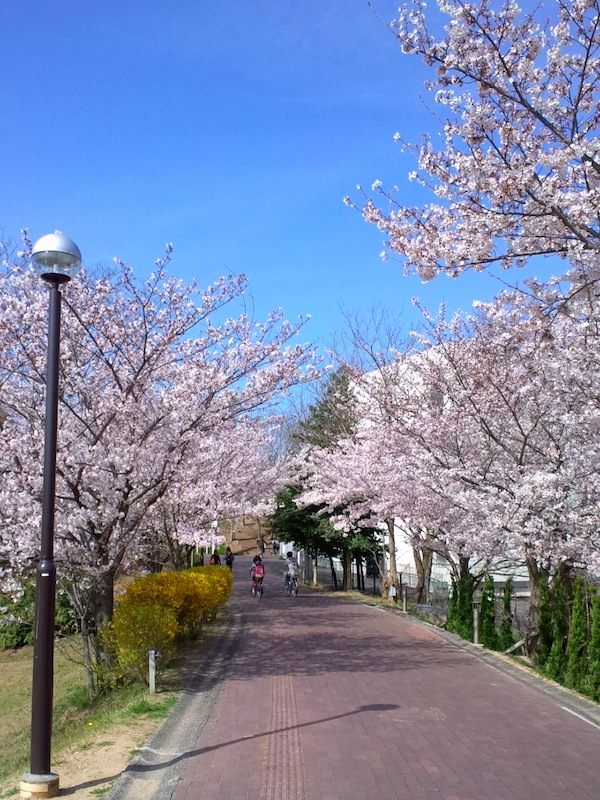
SAKURA road : The road to Habikino campus

The history of the precedent colleges of Naniwa University (NU) is as follows:

In 1883, the prefectural government founded the Veterinary Training Institute (獣医学講習所, Jūigaku kōshūjo) attached to Osaka Prefectural Medical School. In 1888, the institute was moved to Osaka Prefectural School of Agriculture (大阪府立農学校, Ōsaka furitsu nōgakkō) in Sakai, which had two courses of agriculture and veterinary science. In 1942, during World War II, the course for Veterinary Medicine was reorganized into Osaka Higher School of Veterinary Medicine (大阪高等獣医学校), which was renamed Osaka College of Veterinary Medicine and Animal Husbandry (大阪獣医畜産専門学校) in 1945. This prefectural college, together with Osaka Agricultural College (大阪農業専門学校, established in 1944 in Ikeda), constituted NU Faculty of Agriculture (now OPU Graduate School of Life and Environmental Sciences/School of Life and Environmental Sciences).

The main origin was founded as Osaka National Higher School of Engineering (官立大阪高等工業学校) in 1939, which was renamed Osaka National College of Engineering in 1944. Its site is now the main (Nakamozu) campus of OPU. The college was merged with four prefectural technical colleges to constitute NU Faculty of Engineering (now OPU Graduate School of Engineering/School of Engineering). In 1950, two of the former prefectural colleges constituted Junior Technical College Division (one campus in Neyagawa and the other in Yodogawa-ku, Osaka. Neyagawa campus was reorganized into Osaka Prefectural College of Technology [大阪府立大学工業高等専門学校] in 1962, while Yodogawa campus was later abolished).

Still other origin was established as Osaka Youth Normal School (a national college: 官立大阪青年師範学校) in 1944. This teachers college constituted NU Faculty of Education, which was later abolished and reorganized into Division of Liberal Arts (now OPU Faculty of Liberal Arts and Sciences).

The Junior College of Agriculture, University of Osaka Prefecture (大阪府立大学農業短期大学部, Osaka Furitsu Daigaku Nogyo Tanki Daigakubu) was a junior college in Mihara-ku, Sakai. It was established in 1953, and closed in 1964. It offered courses in agriculture and food chemistry.

=== Osaka Women's University ===
OWU was established in 1949 by developing Osaka Prefecture Women's College, which was established in 1924 under old educational systems (the second oldest public women's college in Japan). Its campus was originally located in Sumiyoshi-ku, Osaka. In 1976, the university was moved to Sakai. The campus (abolished in March 2007) was next to Daisen-kofun (supposed to be the tomb of Emperor Nintoku).

OWU at first had one faculty: Faculty of Liberal Arts and Education, which included:

- Course for Japanese Literature
- Course for English Literature
- Course for Social Welfare
- Course for Life Science

In 1999 Faculty of Liberal Arts and Education was reorganized into two faculties:

- Faculty of Humanities and Social Sciences
- Faculty of Science

=== Osaka Prefecture College of Nursing ===
OPCN was founded as Osaka Prefecture Junior College of Nursing in 1978. Its campus was located in Sumiyoshi-ku, Osaka. In 1994, the junior college developed into Osaka Prefecture College of Nursing (four-year course, located in Habikino, Osaka).

== Graduate schools ==
- Engineering
- Life and Environmental Sciences
- Science
- Economics
- Humanities and Social Sciences
- Nursing (in Habikino Campus)

== Undergraduate schools ==
- Engineering
- Life and Environmental Sciences
- Science
- Economics
- Humanities and Social Sciences
- Comprehensive Rehabilitation
- Liberal Arts and Sciences
- Nursing (in Habikino Campus)

== Campus life ==
OPU has one of the largest campus areas in Japan, and it has a very nice relaxing atmosphere especially in the parks where children often come to play during holidays. There are four cafeterias which are popular among the students and also the professors.

OPU is specially superior in the engineering science field. All information about classes and student's results are administered using an IT System and there are many computers for students to use freely.

OPU has four school festivals namely "Yuko festival", "Tanabata festival", "Anju festival" and "Shirasagi festival." The Yuko festival is held in May, where many freshmen set up refreshment booths and make friends in this festival, since "Yuko" means "friendship" in Japanese. The Shirasagi festival is held in November and is a big festival that has been a tradition for more than 60 years. Every year, in this festival there are many booths and four stages for some events, where famous singers and artists are invited to perform. Of the refreshment booths, the one selling "Churros" is the most popular. Each festival, many people come and check out the booths and enjoy the events and OPU.

OPU has two large famous gates: Nakamozu gate and Shirasagi gate. Those gates are used by most people who go to OPU. OPU has facilities such as library, U Function hall and grassy areas where people can have picnics, so in weekdays most students enter the university through those gates in order to take lessons, and in the weekends, people who live near OPU enter through those gates in order to play or just walk around in the parks inside of the university.

== Evaluation from Business World ==
The university ranking of the ratio of "president and chief executive officer of listed company" in Japan
	Ranking
all universities in Japan	21st out of all the 744 universities which existed as of 2006
Source	2006 Survey by Weekly Diamond 〈ja〉 on the ranking of the universities which produced the high ratio of the graduates who hold the position of "president and chief executive officer of listed company" to all the graduates of each university

The university ranking according to the ratio of the number of the officers & managers produced by each university to the number of graduates
	Ranking
all universities in Japan	30th out of all the 778 universities which existed as of 2010
Source	2010 Survey by Weekly Economist 〈ja〉 on the ranking of universities according to the ratio of the number of the officers & managers produced by each university to the number of graduates

The university ranking according to the order of the evaluation by Personnel Departments of Leading Companies in Japan
	Ranking
Japan	16th (out of 781 universities in Japan as of 2020)
Source	2020 Nikkei Survey to all listed (3,714) and leading unlisted (1,100), totally 4,814 companies

== See also ==
- Technical Junior College University of Osaka Prefecture
