= Technical Junior College University of Osaka Prefecture =

Public junior college in Ikuno-ku, Osaka, Japan

- 大阪府立大学工業短期大学部
- Type: Public
- Active: 1950–1983
- Location: Ikuno-ku, Osaka, Japan
- Website: www.osakafu-u.ac.jp/info/outline/history.html

The Technical Junior College University of Osaka Prefecture (大阪府立大学工業短期大学部, Ōsaka Furitsu Daigaku Kōgyō Tanki Daigakubu) was a public junior college in Ikuno-ku, Osaka, Japan.

== History ==
- 1949: The school's predecessor was founded.
- 1950: The junior college for mechanical engineering and electrical engineering was founded.
- 1951: The third academic department was set up.
- 1964: Daytime courses at Neyagawa were discontinued.
- 1967: The Campus moved from Asahi-ku to Ikuno-ku.
- 1983: The university ceased operations.

== Academic departments ==
- Mechanical engineering
- Electrical engineering
- Welding

== See also ==
- Osaka Prefecture University
- Junior College of Agriculture, University of Osaka Prefecture
