= Isao Taniguchi =

Japanese footballer

Isao Taniguchi 谷口功
Personal information
- Full name: Isao Taniguchi
- Date of birth: 16 February 1991 (age 35)
- Place of birth: Ikuno-ku, Osaka, Japan
- Height: 1.78 m (5 ft 10 in)
- Position: Defender

Youth career
- 2009–2012: Momoyama Gakuin University

Senior career*
Years	Team	Apps	(Gls)
2013–2014	Giravanz Kitakyushu	0	(0)
2014	→ Kagoshima United FC (loan)	21	(2)
2015–2019	Kagoshima United FC	59	(1)
- * Club domestic league appearances and goals as of 5 January 2020

Isao Taniguchi (谷口功, Taniguchi Isao; born 16 February 1991 in Ikuno-ku, Osaka) is a former Japanese football defender who mostly played for Kagoshima United FC.

== Club statistics ==
Updated to 23 February 2020.

Club performance			League		Cup		Total	
Season	Club	League	Apps	Goals	Apps	Goals	Apps	Goals
Japan			League		Emperor's Cup		Total	
2013	Giravanz Kitakyushu	J2 League	0	0	0	0	0	0
2014	Kagoshima United FC	JFL	21	2	2	0	23	2
2015	Kagoshima United FC	JFL	17	0	0	0	17	0
2016	Kagoshima United FC	J3 League	2	0	0	0	2	0
2017	Kagoshima United FC	J3 League	8	1	1	0	9	1
2018	Kagoshima United FC	J3 League	16	0	2	1	18	1
2019	Kagoshima United FC	J2 League	0	0	1	0	1	0
Career total			64	3	6	1	70	4
