= Hidekazu Mitsuyama =

Japanese baseball player and coach (born 1965)

Hidekazu Mitsuyama 光山 英和
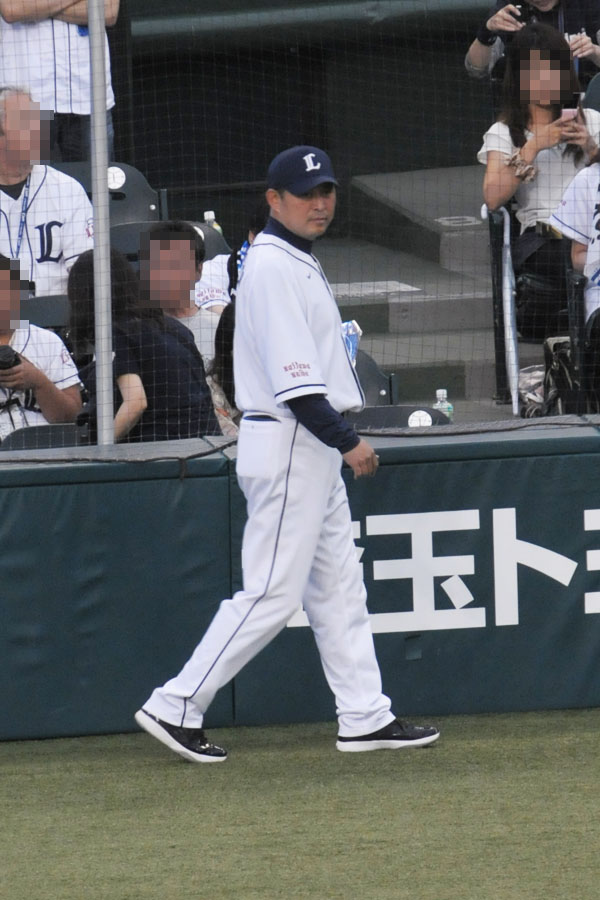

Chiba Lotte Marines – No. 90
- Catcher/Catching coach
- Born: November 20, 1965 (age 60); Ikuno-ku, Osaka, Japan
- Batted: Right Threw: Right

NPB debut
- April 5, 1986, for the Kintetsu Buffaloes

Last appearance
- June 30, 2010, for the Yokohama BayStars

NPB statistics
- Batting average: .238
- On-base percentage: .288
- Slugging percentage: .367
- Stats at Baseball Reference

Teams
- As player: Kintetsu Buffaloes (1986–1996); Chunichi Dragons (1997–1998); Yomiuri Giants (1999); Chiba Lotte Marines (2001); Yokohama BayStars (2002); Lotte Giants (2003); As coach: Saitama Seibu Lions (2011–2013); Yokohama DeNA BayStars (2016–2018); Tohoku Rakuten Golden Eagles (2019–2022); Chiba Lotte Marines (2023–)
- Last updated on: 15 December 2022

Hidekazu Mitsuyama (光山 英和, Mitsuyama Hidekazu; born November 20, 1965) is a Japanese former professional baseball catcher who played in Nippon Professional Baseball (NPB) from 1986 to 1999, and again from 2001 to 2002. He is currently a battery coach for the Yokohama DeNA BayStars.
