= Tennōji-ku =

Ward of Osaka, Japan

Coordinates: 34°39′28″N 135°31′10″E

Location of Tennōji-ku in Osaka

Tennōji Ward (Japanese: 天王寺区, romanized: Tennōji-ku) is one of 24 wards of Osaka, Osaka Prefecture, Japan. It is named after the Shitennō-ji, the temple of the Four Heavenly Kings, which is located in the ward.

== General information ==
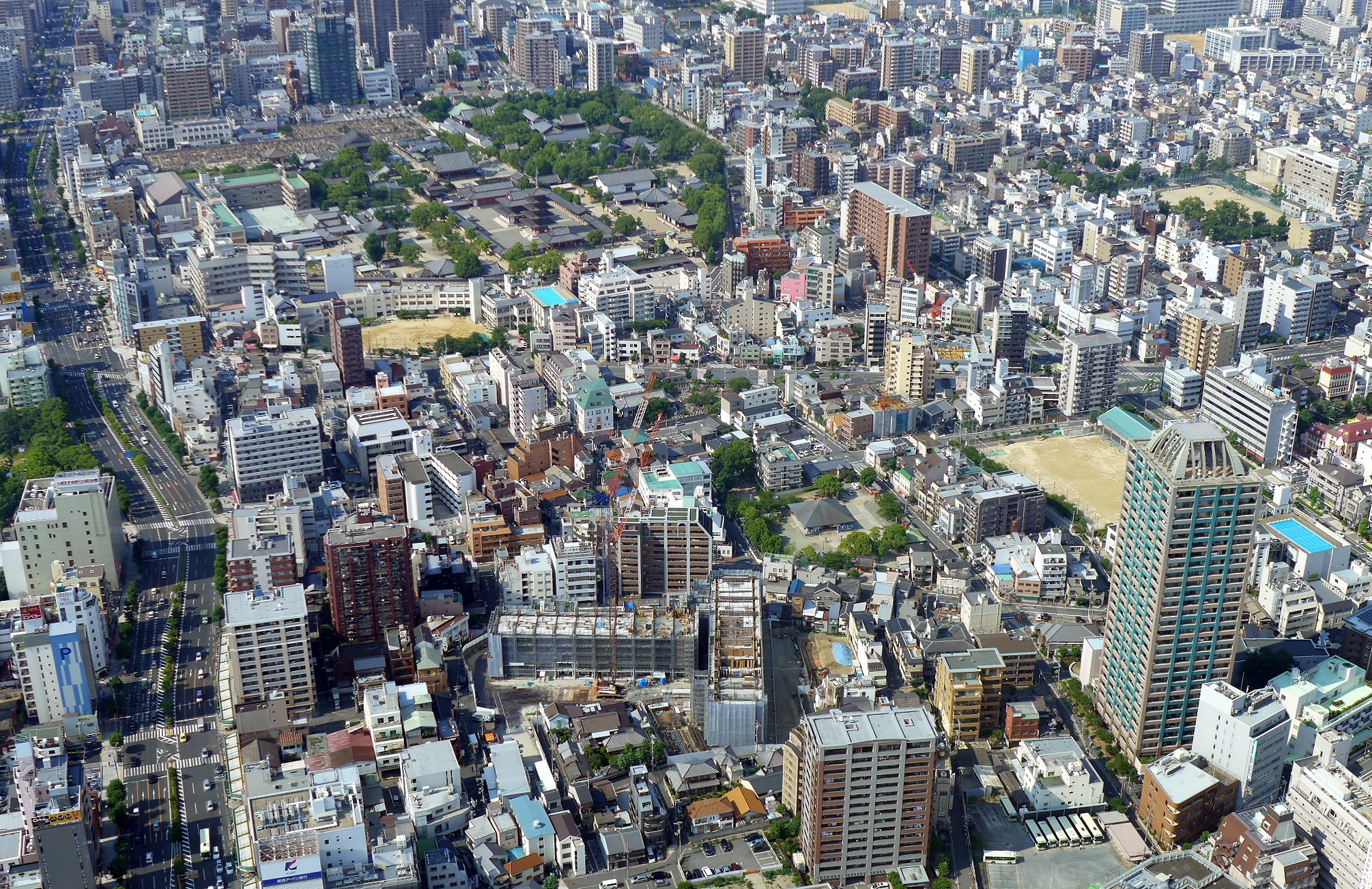
Buildings in Tennōji-ku

Tennōji Station is the city's main southeastern rail terminal with Osaka Municipal Subway's Tennōji Station Midōsuji Line and Tanimachi Line, JR Tennōji as the terminus of the JR Hanwa Line (and a major stop on the Kyoto Line, Osaka Loop Line, Yamatoji Line and Kansai Airport Line) and the Kintetsu Abenobashi Station, directly across the street from Tennōji station is the terminus of the Minami Osaka Line. As a result of its being a major railway hub, it has become a major built up area in southern Osaka. The buildings around the station include, the Kintetsu department store, Mio, Station Plaza, and Hoop shopping malls, Apollo Movie Theater and Lucias shopping mall, as well as the more recent Q's Mall. In addition, there are several shopping streets in the area including Abenobashisuji. The Kintetsu Abeno Harukas building, which houses the Kintetsu department store, was fully opened in the spring of 2014 and is currently the tallest building in Osaka at 300 meters (984 ft.) in height. It was the tallest building in Japan from 2014 to 2023, until Azabudai Hills Mori JP Tower seized the title.

== Economy ==
Aigan, the eyeglasses (spectacles) chain, is headquartered in Tennōji-ku. Descente, a sportswear company, also has its headquarters in the ward.

== Attractions ==
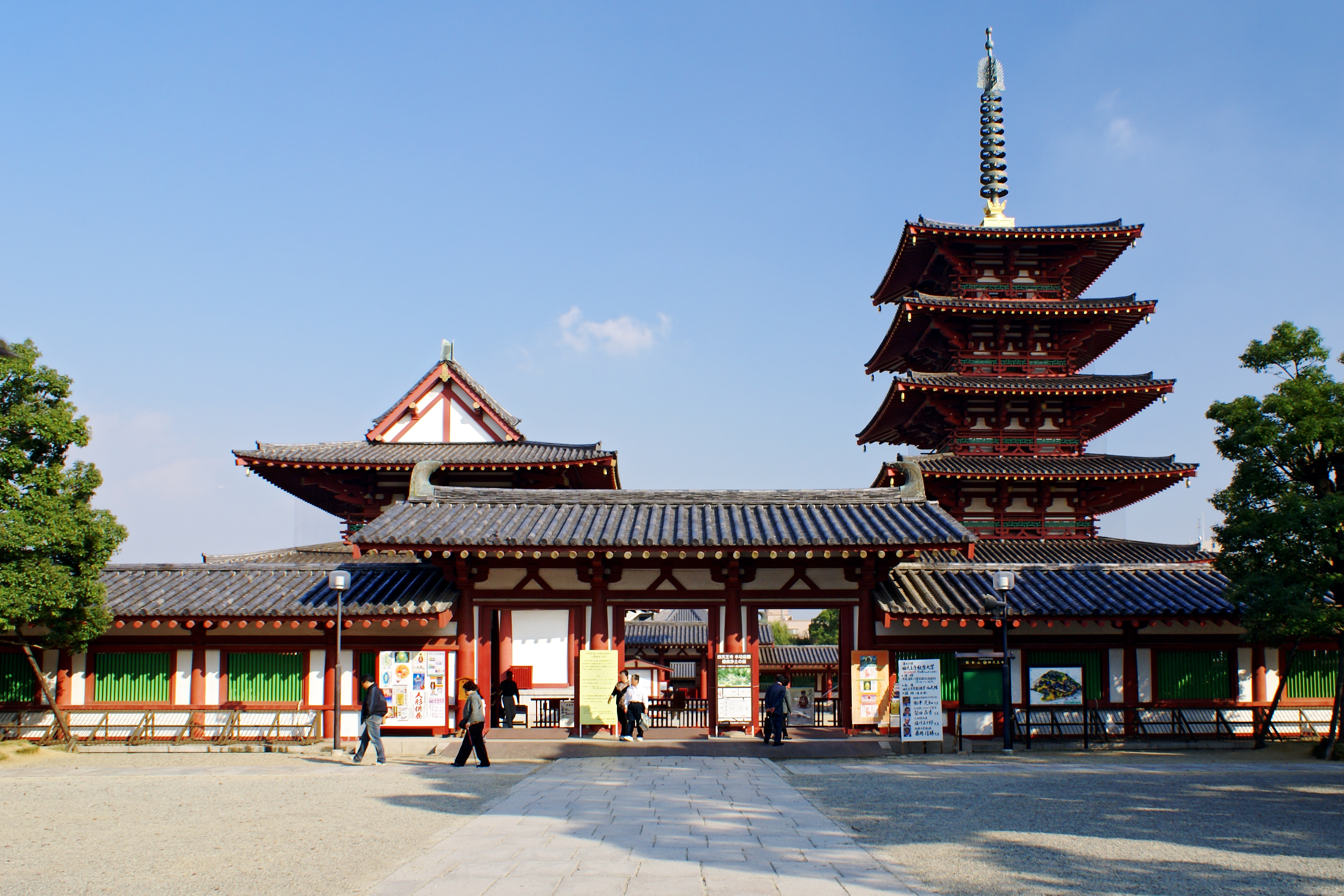
Shitennō-ji temple

- Shitennō-ji, the first Buddhist temple in Japan – is a historical site only a ten-minute walk from Tennōji Station
- Ikukunitama Shrine, Shinto shrine
- Isshin-ji is a major Buddhist temple located between Tennoji Park and Shitennō-ji
- Tennōji Park includes the Osaka Municipal Museum of Art and Tennōji Zoo
- Tenjin zaka slope leading to Yasui Shrine.

== Entertainment ==
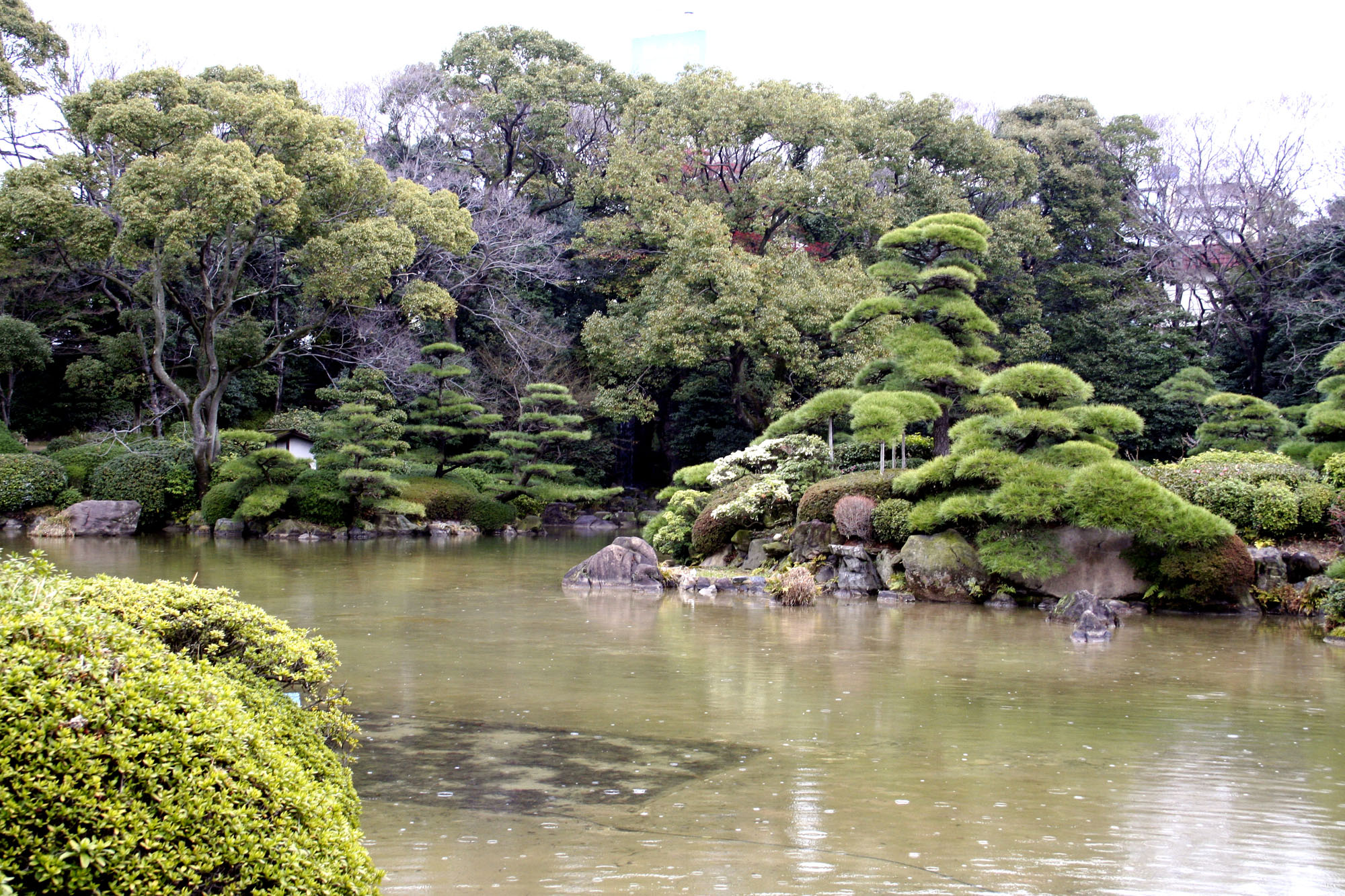
Tennōji Park in the neighborhood

Tennōji ward is home to the Osaka Municipal Museum of Art, Tennōji Zoo, the Keitaku-en Japanese garden (built by the Sumitomo Corporation) and the Tennōji Botanical Garden.

There are four major shopping centers near Tennōji Station: Mio, a fashionable, upscale mall; Kintetsu Department Store; Hoop, and Q's Mall- targeted primarily at younger shoppers, but also home to a large number of restaurants and eateries.

The nearby Shinsekai entertainment district was established in the early part of the last century and still teems with scores of eateries. It is overlooked by the Tsutenkaku tower, one of Osaka's most famous symbols.

== Education ==
Public schools:

- Shimizudani High School

Private schools:

- Shitennoji Junior and Senior High School

== Train stations ==
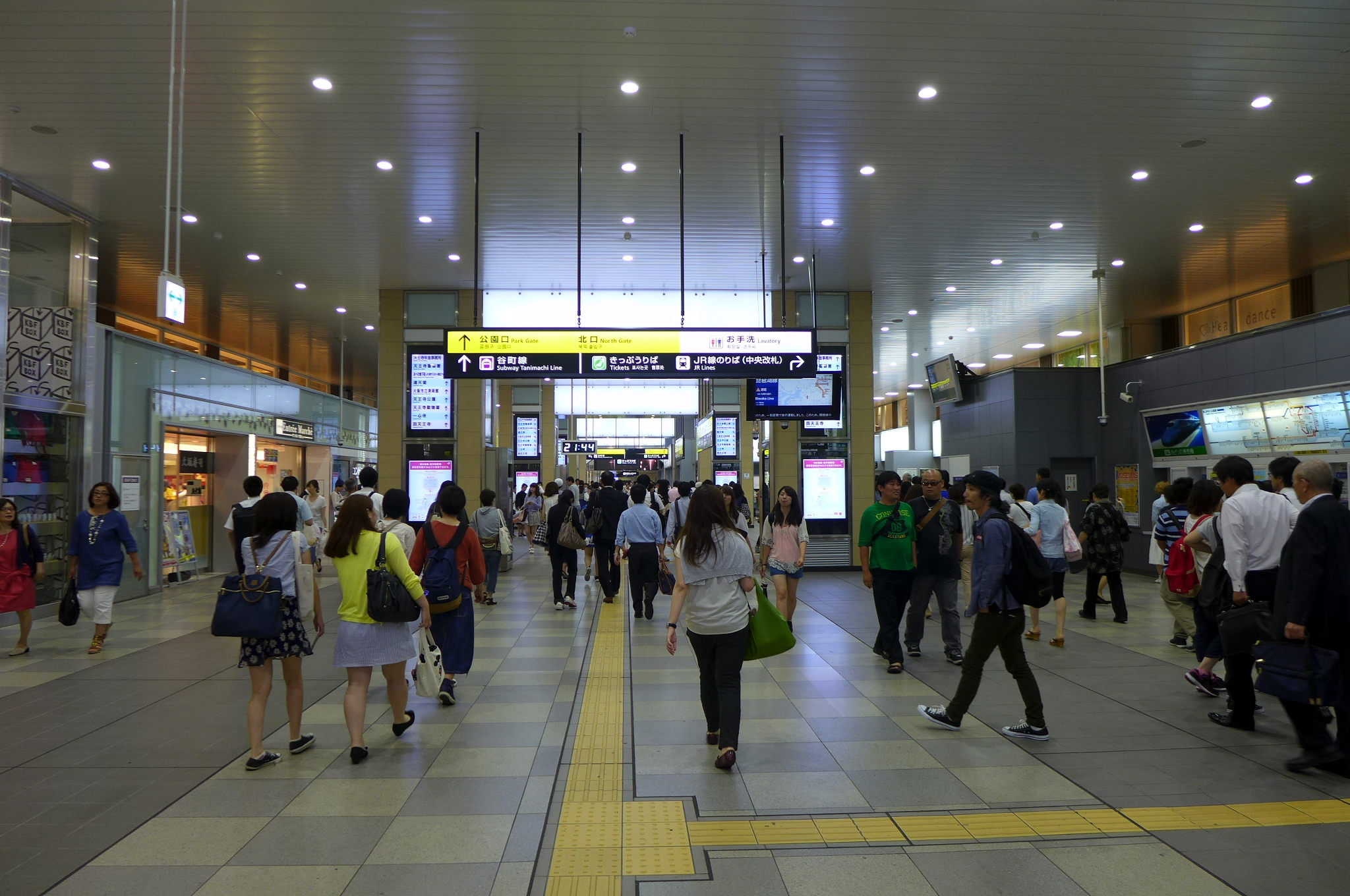
Tennōji Station

- West Japan Railway Company (JR West)
  - Osaka Loop Line: Tennōji Station – Teradachō Station – Momodani Station – Tsuruhashi Station – Tamatsukuri Station
  - Hanwa Line, Kansai Main Line (Yamatoji Line): Tennōji Station
- Kintetsu Railway
  - Osaka Line: Osaka Uehommachi Station – Tsuruhashi Station
  - Osaka Abenobashi Station on the Minami Osaka Line in Abeno-ku is close to Tennōji Station in Tennōji-ku.
- Hankai Tramway
  - Hankai Uemachi Line: Tennōji-eki-mae Station (Located in Abeno-ku, but close to Tennōji Station in Tennōji-ku.)
- Osaka Metro
  - Tanimachi Line: Tanimachi Kyuchome Station – Shitennoji-mae Yuhigaoka Station – Tennōji Station
  - Tennōji Station on the Midōsuji Line is located in Abeno-ku, but close to Tennōji-ku.
  - Sennichimae Line: Tanimachi Kyuchome Station – Tsuruhashi Station
  - Nagahori Tsurumi-ryokuchi Line: Tamatsukuri Station

== Notable people ==
- Mr. Hito, Japanese professional wrestler
- Ryosuke Irie, Japanese competitive swimmer
- Sana Minatozaki, singer, member of South Korean girl group Twice
- Takeshi Kaikō, prominent post-World War II Japanese novelist, short-story writer, essayist, literary critic, and television documentary screenwriter
- Kitamura Kazuki, Japanese actor
- Aiko Nakamura, former professional tennis player
- Yoshihiro Tatsumi, Japanese manga artist
- Akiko Wada, singer and businesswoman
- Daiki Yoshikawa, Japanese professional baseball player
