= Teradachō Station =

Railway station in Osaka, Japan

Teradacho Station 寺田町駅
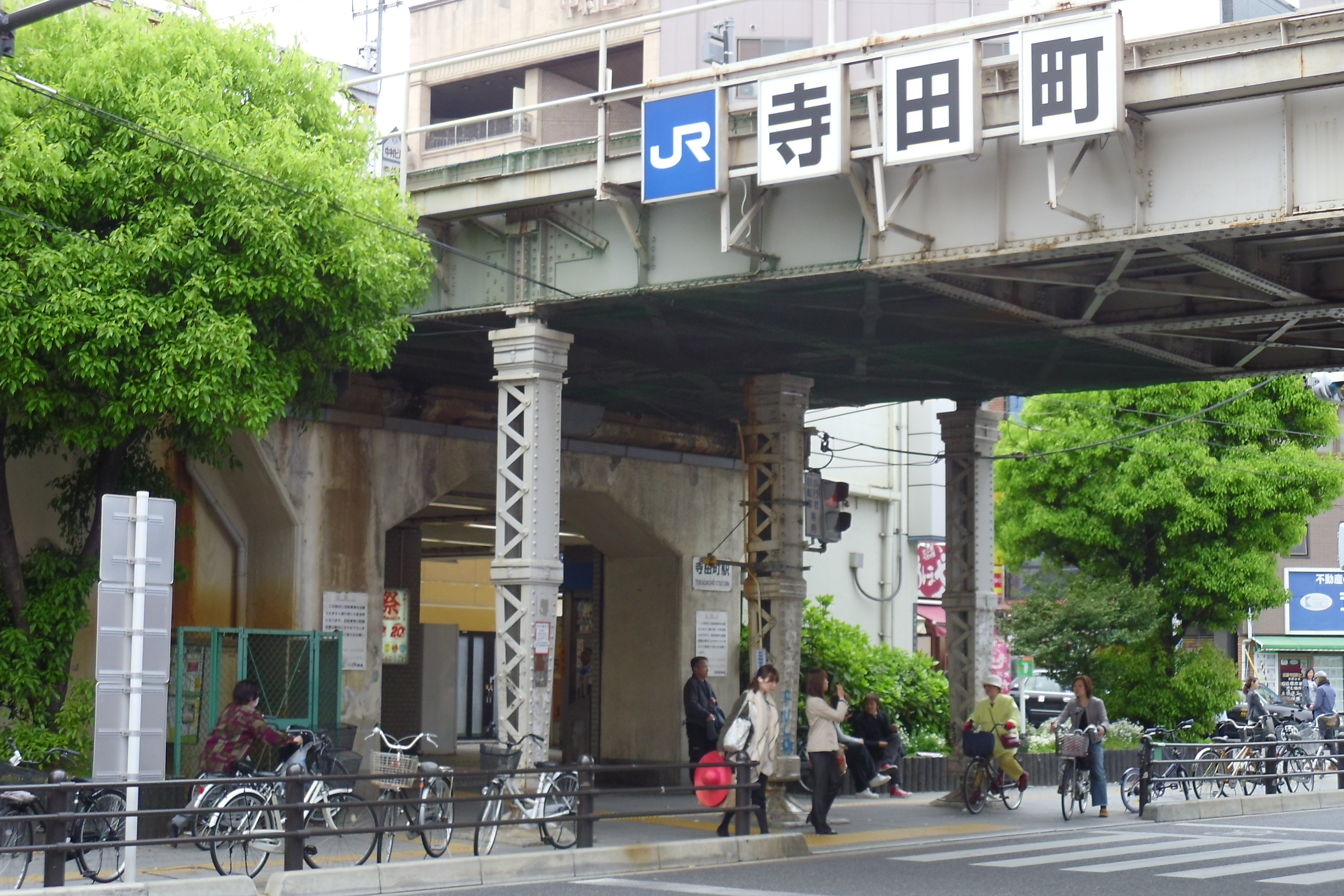
- Teradacho Station entrance in February 2011

General information
- Location: 4-11-21 Daidō, Tennōji-ku, Osaka-shi, Osaka-fu; Japan
- Coordinates: 34°38′52.36″N 135°31′24.13″E
- Operator: JR West
- Line: O Osaka Loop Line
- Platforms: 2 side platforms
- Tracks: 2
- Connections: Bus stop

Other information
- Station code: JR-O02
- Website: Official website

History
- Opened: 16 July 1932
Location
- Location within Japan

Teradacho Station (寺田町駅, Teradachō-eki) is a railway station on the Osaka Loop Line in Tennōji-ku, Osaka, Japan, operated by West Japan Railway Company (JR West).

== Station layout ==
The station has two elevated side platforms, serving two tracks.

=== Platforms ===
1	■ Osaka Loop Line	inner track (counter-clockwise) for Tsuruhashi and Kyōbashi
2	■ Osaka Loop Line	outer track (clockwise) for Tennōji and Shin-Imamiya

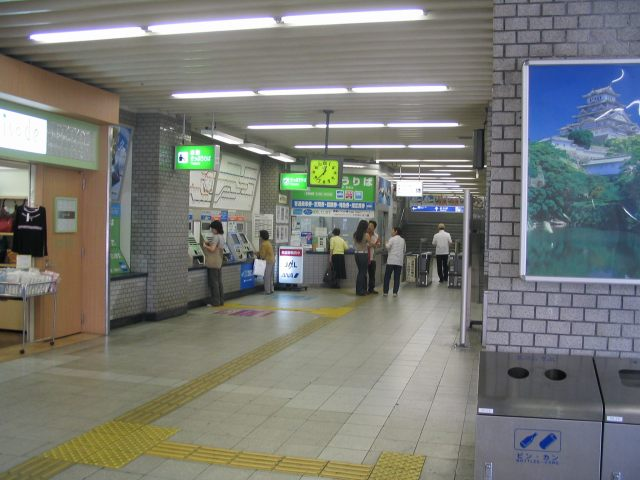
The ticket vending machines and ticket barriers in September 2006

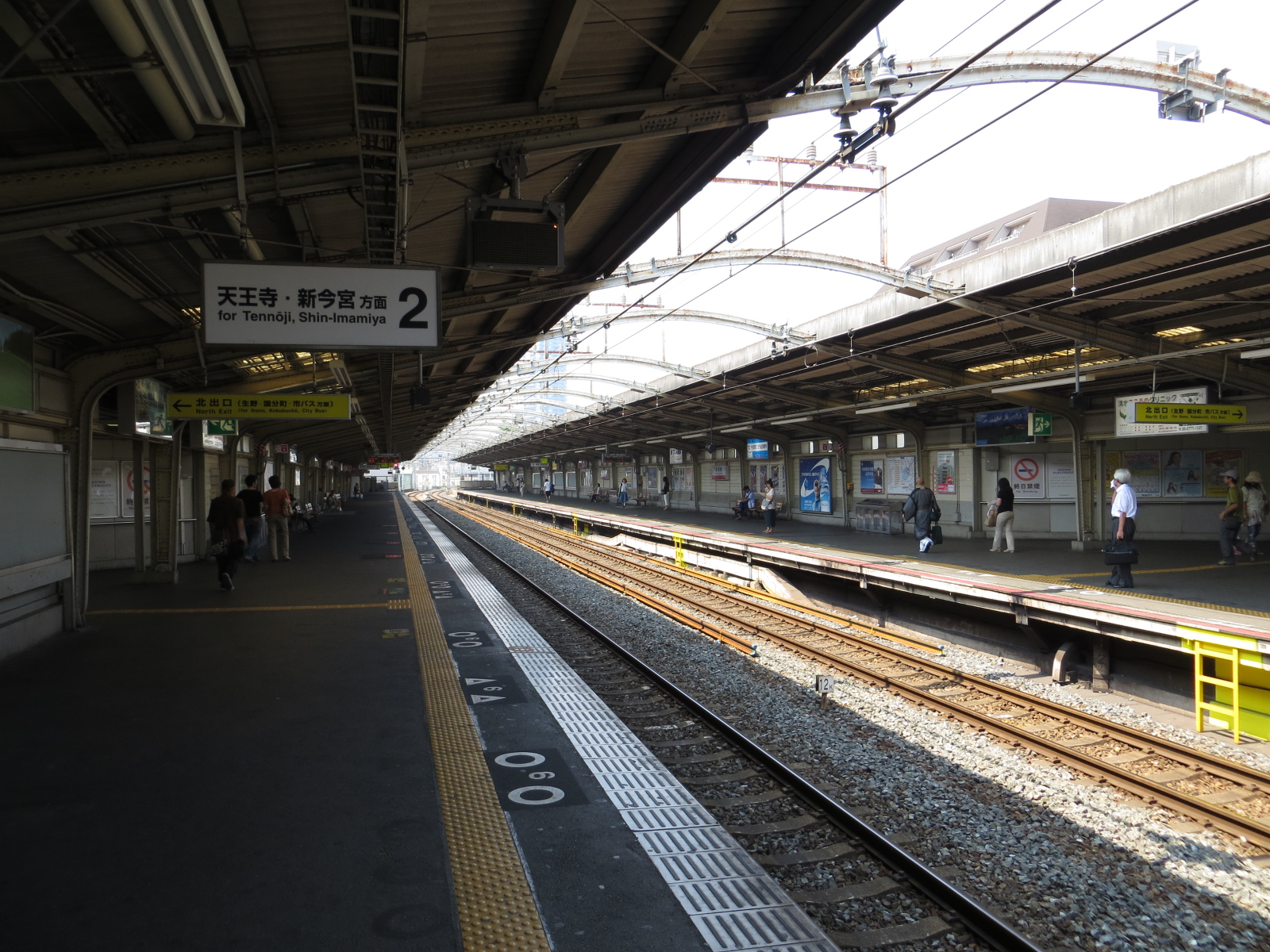
The platforms in August 2013

== Adjacent stations ==
«	Service	»
Osaka Loop Line
Tennōji	-	Momodani

== History ==
The station opened on 16 July 1932. Following the privatization of Japanese National Railways (JNR) on 1 April 1987, the station came under the control of JR West.

In August 2015, an old station sign painted directly on the wall and dating from the 1930s or 1940s was uncovered during renovation work, and this was subsequently preserved.

Station numbering was introduced in March 2018 with Teradacho being assigned station number JR-O02.

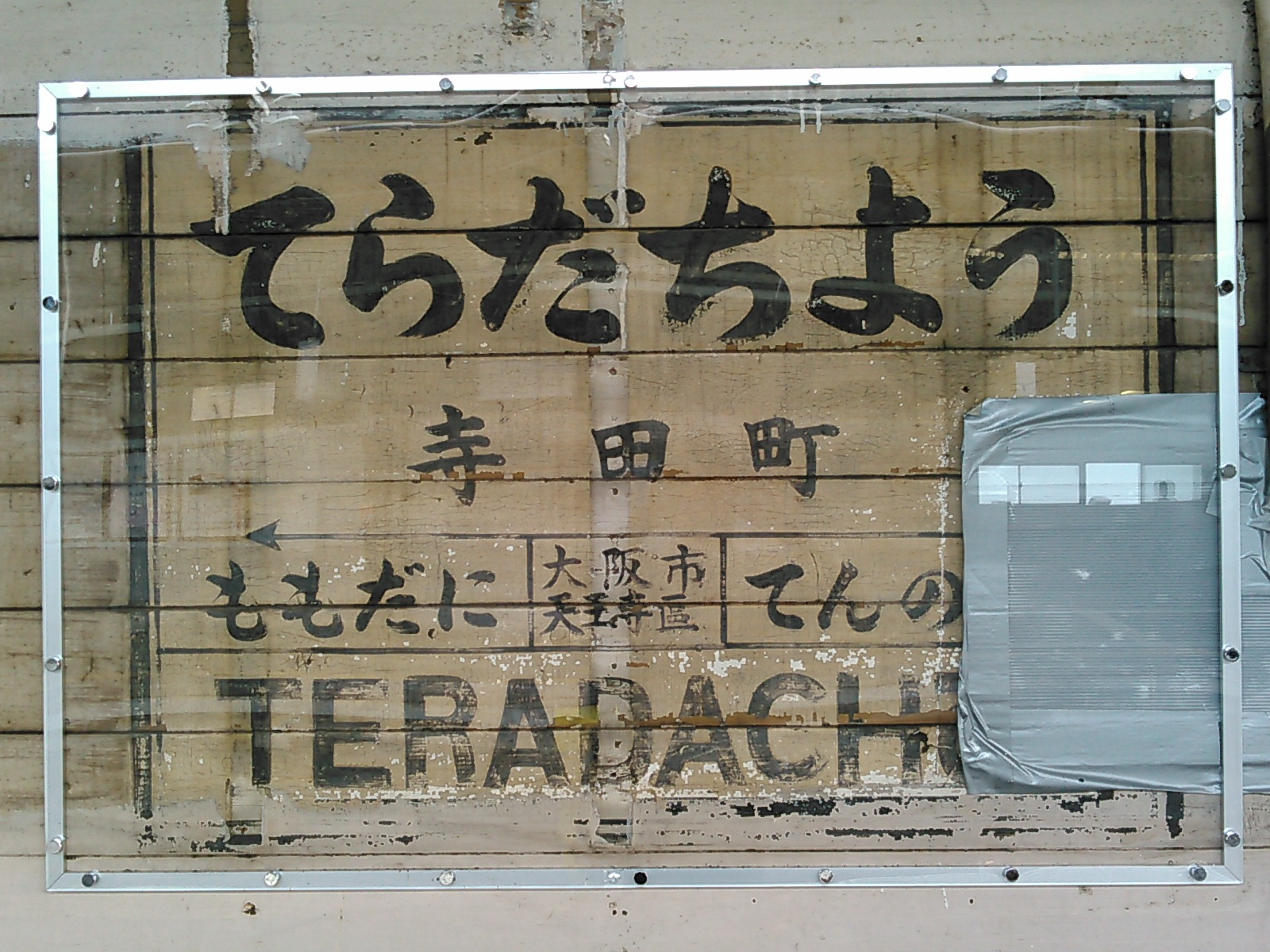
The old station sign uncovered in August 2015

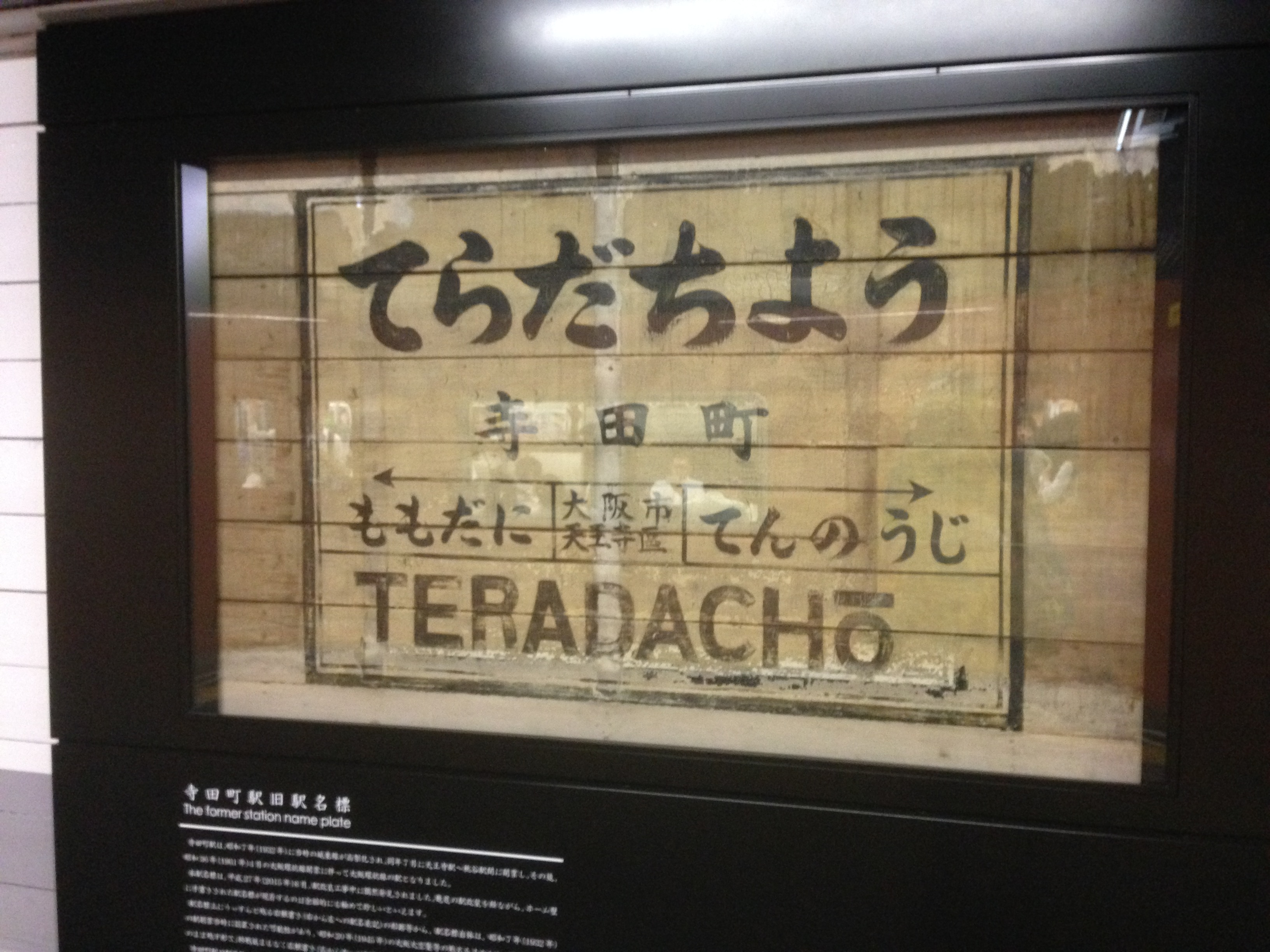
The old station sign on display in July 2016

== Surrounding area ==
- Ikuno Shopping Arcade
- Osaka Kyoiku University Tennōji Junior High School, Osaka Kyoiku University High School Tennōji
- Osaka Ikuno Technical High School
- Kokoku High School
- Clark Memorial International High School

== Bus services ==
Buses operate from the "Teradachō-ekimae" bus stop by Osaka Municipal Transportation Bureau.

== See also ==
- List of railway stations in Japan
