= Kamigyō-ku =

Kamigyō 上京区
- Ward of Kyoto
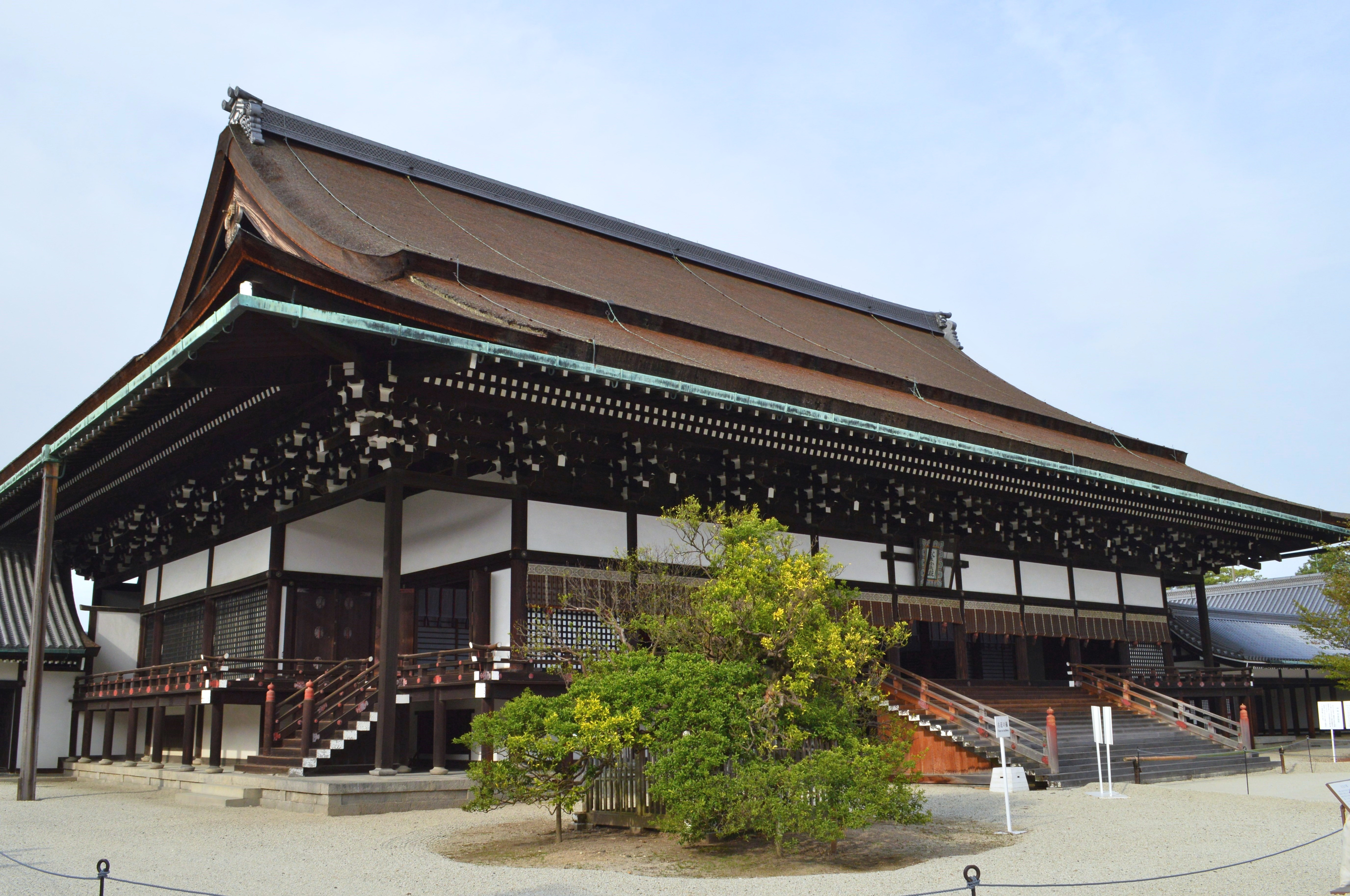
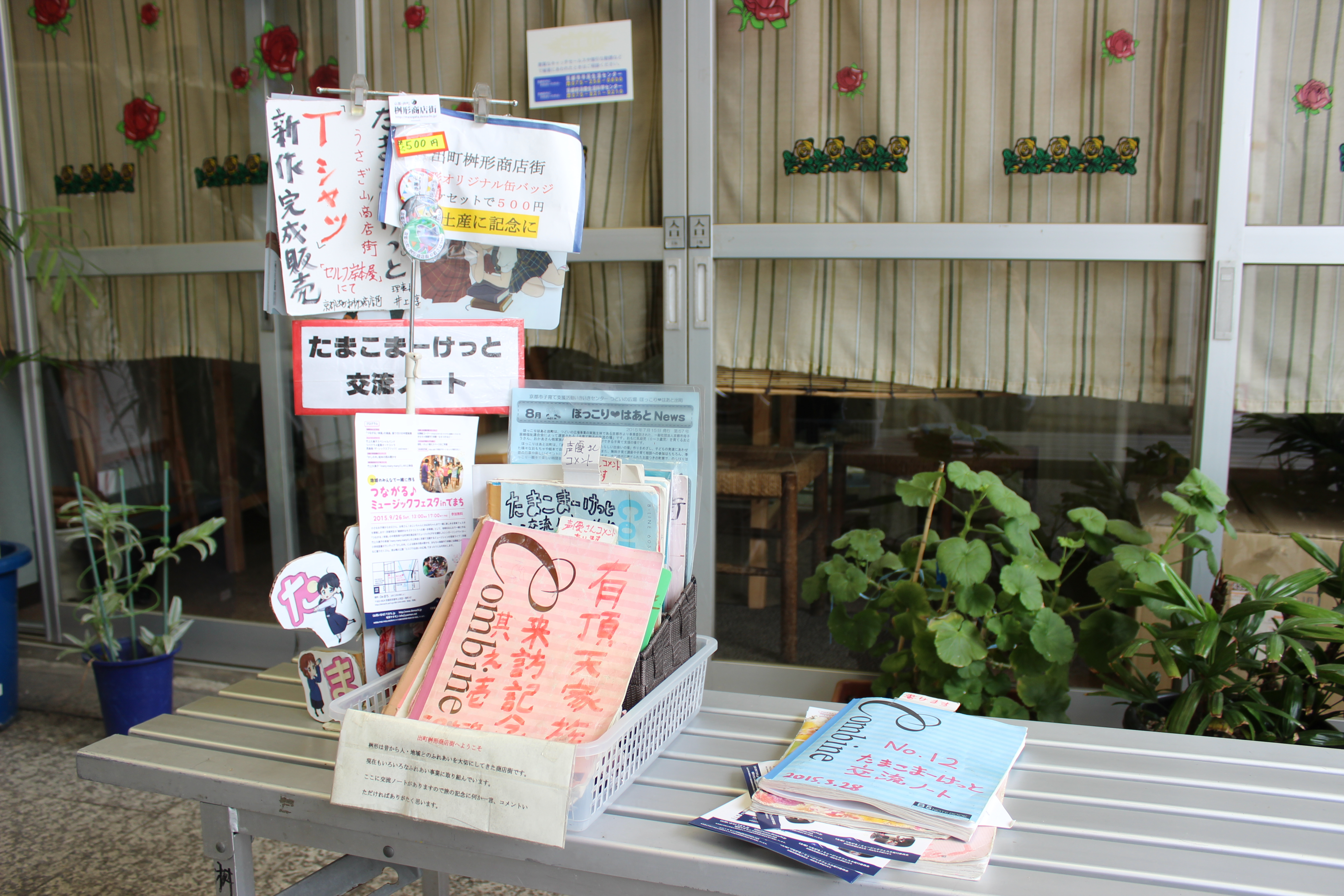
- Top: The Shishinden is a majestic building in the Kyoto Imperial Palace. Bottom: An Exchange Corner at a kiosk in Demachi Shoutenkai featuring characters from Tamako Market.

- Location of Kamigyō-ku in Kyoto

- Location of Kamigyō-ku in Japan
- Coordinates: 35°1′47″N 135°45′24″E
- Country: Japan
- Prefecture: Kyoto
- City: Kyoto
- Founded: 1879

Area
  - Total: 7.03 km^{2} (2.71 sq mi)
- Highest elevation: 77 m (253 ft)
- Lowest elevation: 46 m (151 ft)

Population (October 1, 2020)
  - Total: 83,832
  - Density: 11,900/km^{2} (30,900/sq mi)
- Time zone: UTC+9 (Japan Standard Time)
- Website: www.city.kyoto.lg.jp/kamigyo/

Kamigyō-ku (上京区; かみぎょうく) is one of the eleven wards in the city of Kyoto, in Kyoto Prefecture, Japan. The ward was a district of residences for the royalty, aristocrats, and upper classes in the old capital of JapanーHeian-kyō. Located in the center of the present-day city of Kyoto, Japan, it previously occupied the northern region of the ancient capital of Kyoto. The Kamo River flows on the eastern border of the ward.

The ward is home to the Kyoto Imperial Palace, the Kitano Tenmangu Shinto shrine, the Seimei shrine, nishijin-ori textiles, and the headquarters of the Omotesenke and Urasenke schools of Japanese tea ceremony.

As of 2020, Kamigyō-ku had a population of 83,832 people.

The Masugata Shōtengai Shopping District is the setting of the 2013 anime series, Tamako Market, produced by Kyoto Animation.

== Demographics ==
Historical population
Year	Pop.	±%
1960	148,427	—
1970	124,456	−16.2%
1980	99,262	−20.2%
1990	87,861	−11.5%
2000	84,187	−4.2%
2010	83,264	−1.1%
2020	83,832	+0.7%

== Education ==
- Doshisha University
- Heian Jogakuin University
- Imadegawa Campus of Doshisha Women's College of Liberal Arts
- Kyoto Prefectural University of Medicine

The Lycée Français de Kyoto, the French international school in Kansai, was in this ward.

Kyoto International School is also in this ward.

== See also ==
- Sanbongi-dōri, street in Kamigyō-ku ward
