= Momodani Station =

Railway station in Osaka, Japan

Momodani Station 桃谷駅
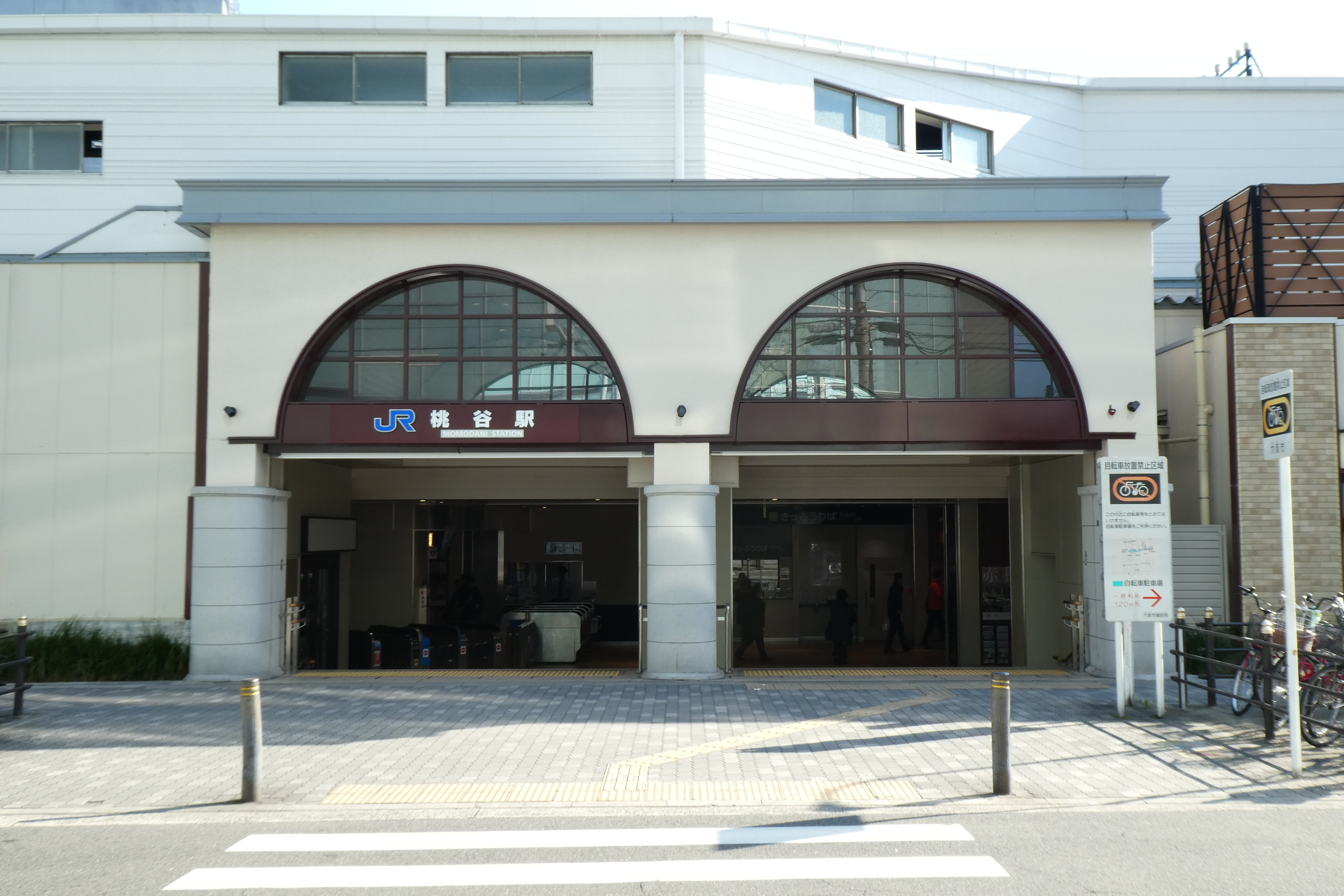

General information
- Location: 1-8-27 Dogashiba, Tennoji, Osaka, Osaka （大阪市天王寺区堂ヶ芝一丁目8-27） Japan
- Coordinates: 34°39′30.78″N 135°31′40.41″E
- Operator: JR West
- Line: Osaka Loop Line
- Connections: Bus stop

Other information
- Station code: JR-O03

History
- Opened: 1895
- Former names: Momoyama (until 1905)
Location

Momodani Station (桃谷駅, Momodani-eki) is a railway station on the Osaka Loop Line in Tennoji-ku, Osaka, Japan, operated by West Japan Railway Company (JR West).

== Station layout ==
This station has two elevated side platforms serving two tracks. The station has a Midori no Madoguchi staffed ticket office.

=== Platforms ===
1	■ Osaka Loop Line	inner track for Tsuruhashi and Kyobashi
2	■ Osaka Loop Line	outer track for Tennoji and Shin-Imamiya

== Adjacent stations ==
«	Service	»
Osaka Loop Line
Teradacho	-	Tsuruhashi

== History ==
The station opened on 28 May 1895 as Momoyama Station (桃山駅). It was renamed Momodani Station on 1 March 1905.

Station numbering was introduced in March 2018 with Momodani being assigned station number JR-O03.

== Surrounding area ==
- Osaka Police Hospital
- Daini Osaka Police Hospital
- Momodani Shopping Arcade

=== Schools ===
- Osaka Prefectural Yuhigaoka High School
- Osaka Prefectural Tennoji Shogyo High School
- Poole Gakuin Junior and Senior High Schools

=== Bus stops ===
Osaka City Bus (Momodani-ekimae)
Route 22: for Suwa Jinja-mae via Tennoji Kuyakusho, Tennoji Kumin Center and Uehommachi Rokuchome / for Abenobashi via Teradacho
Route 73: for Namba via Tsuruhashi-ekimae and Uehommachi Rokuchome / for Deto Bus Terminal via Kumata
Kintetsu Bus (JR Momodani Station)
Route 66 for Kintetsu Uehommachi Station via Osaka Police Hospital (No operations on Saturdays, Sundays, Holidays and from 30 December till 4 January)
