= Stefan Sonnenfeld =

American colorist and business executive

- Born: Konrad Stefan Sonnenfeld; Los Angeles, California, U.S.
- Occupations: Digital intermediate (DI) colorist, Co-founder and President of Company 3
- Notable work: 300; Alice in Wonderland; Godzilla vs. Kong; Zack Snyder's Justice League; Transformers

Stefan Sonnenfeld is an American digital intermediate (DI) colorist, co-founder and president of post-production house Company 3, and president of VFX house Method Studios. He has performed color grading/color correction on many commercials and feature films including the Pirates of the Caribbean and Transformers franchises.

== Career ==
Sonnenfeld grew up in Los Angeles and after a summer job delivering dailies for popular 80s series Miami Vice his interest in post production was ignited. He worked at Pacific Ocean Post during the 1990s.

Described by NPR as a "da Vinci of the movies," Sonnenfeld has worked as a DI colorist for films including Watchmen, Star Trek, Terminator Salvation, 300, Sweeney Todd and Dreamgirls. As many commercial directors made the transition to long-form work, Sonnenfeld became increasingly involved in grading feature films, helping to pioneer the digital intermediate process. Sonnenfeld is among a handful of artists who have championed the telecine (and more recently DI) process.

In 2007, Entertainment Weekly named Sonnenfeld to its list of "50 Smartest People in Hollywood" and Creativity-Online included him in its "Creativity 50" in 2008. Sonnenfeld also received the HPA Award Best Color Grading (Feature Film) for 300 in 2007 and was the recipient of the HPA Award Outstanding Color Grading (Commercial) for Pepsi "Pass" in 2009. In 2010 he received the HPA Award for Outstanding Color Grading Using a DI Process for Alice in Wonderland.

== Sunny Field Entertainment ==
In 2010, Sonnenfeld signed a first-look producing deal with Paramount Pictures for his feature film production company, Sunny Field Entertainment. Based in Santa Monica, CA, Sunny Field is a portal for filmmakers in the commercial/music video space making the leap into features. Sunny Field's offerings include the traditional resources of a production company as well as state-of-the-art post-production services.

== Selected filmography ==
=== Feature films ===
As finishing artist/colorist, supervisor & producer

Year	Title	Director(s)	Cinematographer(s)	Editor(s)	Roles	Other notes
1998	Rush Hour	Brett Ratner	Adam Greenberg	Mark Helfrich	Company 3 Film to Tape Transfer Supervisor	Laser Pacific Film to Tape Transfer Colorist: Mike Sowa
1999	Being John Malkovich	Spike Jonze	Lance Acord	Eric Zumbrunnen	Videotape Colorist, Company 3	Color Timing: David Orr, Gloria Kaiser
2000	Gone in 60 Seconds	Dominic Sena	Paul Cameron	Roger Barton, Chris Lebenzon, Thomas Muldoon Additional Editor: Joel Negron	Colorist, Company 3	Color Timer: Bob Kaiser
2000	The Cell	Tarsem Singh	Paul Laufer	Robert Duffy, Paul Rubell	Colorist Deluxe Color Timer: Jim Passon	Joint collaboration between Company 3, Deluxe and Toybox Toybox Senior Colorist: Gary Chuntz
2001	Pearl Harbor	Michael Bay	John Schwartzman	Roger Barton, Mark Goldblatt, Chris Lebenzon, Steven Rosenblum Additional Editor: Jim May	Digital Color Timer	Color Timer: Bob Kaiser
2001	Spy Game	Tony Scott	Dan Mindel	Christian Wagner	Digital Telecine Colorist	Assistant Colorists: Shane Harris, Mark Todd Osborne
2001	Black Hawk Down	Ridley Scott	Sławomir Idziak	Pietro Scalia	Digital Color Timer	Color Timer: Bob Kaiser Colorist (2019 Remaster): Stephen Nakamura
2003	Pirates of the Caribbean: The Curse of the Black Pearl	Gore Verbinski	Dariusz Wolski	Craig Wood, Stephen E. Rivkin, Arthur Schmidt	Company 3 Digital Color Timer	Technique Digital Film Colorist: Stephen Nakamura Technique Additional Digital Film Colorist: Tony Dustin
2003	Bad Boys II	Michael Bay	Amir Mokri	Mark Goldblatt, Thomas A. Muldoon, Roger Barton Additional Editor: Jason Hellmann	Digital Colorist/Telecine Colorist	Color Timer: Robert Kaiser Company 3 Assistant Colorists: Mark Todd Osborne, Shane Harris
2003	Lost in Translation	Sofia Coppola	Lance Acord	Sarah Flack	Colorist	
2003	The Texas Chainsaw Massacre	Marcus Nispel	Daniel Pearl	Glen Scantlebury	Colorist (with John Zaik)	
2004	Man on Fire	Tony Scott	Paul Cameron	Christian Wagner Additional Editor: Robert Duffy	Executive Producer/Colorist	Assistant Colorist: Shane Harris Additional Colorist: Mark Todd Osborne
2004	King Arthur	Antoine Fuqua	Slawomir Idziak	Conrad Buff, Jamie Pearson	Executive Producer	Digital Intermediate completed at One Post in London Colorist: Rob Pizzey
2004	Collateral	Michael Mann	Dion Beebe, Paul Cameron	Jim Miller, Paul Rubell	CO3 Executive Producer/Colorist	
2004	The Hunger	Tony Scott	Stephen Goldblatt	Pamela Power, Peter Honess	Digital Remaster Colorist	Originally released in 1983. Remastered in 2004 for DVD release
2004	After the Sunset	Brett Ratner	Dante Spinotti	Mark Helfrich	CO3 Executive Producer/Colorist	
2004	National Treasure	Jon Turteltaub	Caleb Deschanel	William Goldenberg	Company 3 Color Timer	Technicolor Color Timer: Stephen Nakamura Company 3 Assistant Color Timer: Mark Todd Osborne
2005	The Amityville Horror	Andrew Douglas	Peter Lyons Collister	Roger Barton, Christian Wagner	CO3 Executive Producer/Colorist	
2005	War of the Worlds	Steven Spielberg	Janusz Kamiński	Michael Kahn	CO3 Executive Producer/Colorist	Color Timer: Dale Grahn
2005	The Island	Michael Bay	Mauro Fiore	Paul Rubell, Christian Wagner	Executive Producer and Colorist	Color Assistant/Dailies Colorist: Mark Todd Osborne DI Assistants: Nick Hasson, Christopher Reichel
2005	Capote	Bennett Miller	John Barr	Christopher Tellefsen	Colorist (with Mark Todd Osborne)	Technicolor Color Coordinator: Joey Violante Color Timer: Fred Heid
2005	Domino	Tony Scott	Dan Mindel	William Goldenberg, Christian Wagner	CO3 Executive Producer/Colorist	EFilm Lab Color Timer: Michael Hatzer
2005	The Weather Man	Gore Verbinski	Phedon Papamichael	Craig Wood	Executive Producer / Colorist	Assistant / Dailies Colorist: Mark Todd Osborne Digital Cinema Consultant: Steven B. Cohen
2006	Underworld: Evolution	Len Wiseman	Simon Duggan	Nicolas de Toth	CO3 Executive Producer	Colorist: Siggy Ferstl
2006	Glory Road	James Gartner	Jeffrey Kimball, John Toon	Jason Hellmann, John Wright	Executive Producer / Colorist	
2006	Mission: Impossible III	J. J. Abrams	Dan Mindel	Maryann Brandon, Mary Jo Markey	Executive Producer / Colorist	
2006	X-Men: The Last Stand	Brett Ratner	Dante Spinotti	Mark Helfrich, Julia Wong, Mark Goldblatt	Executive Producer / Colorist	
2006	Pirates of the Caribbean: Dead Man's Chest	Gore Verbinski	Dariusz Wolski	Craig Wood, Stephen E. Rivkin	Executive Producer / Colorist	
2006	Miami Vice	Michael Mann	Dion Beebe	William Goldenberg, Paul Rubell	Executive Producer / Colorist	On-Line Editor: Rob Doolittle Color Timer: Kurt Smith
2006	Invincible	Ericson Core		Gerald B. Greenberg	Executive Producer / Colorist	
2006	Gridiron Gang	Phil Joanou	Jeff Cutter	Joel Negron	Executive Producer / Colorist	
2006	The Texas Chainsaw Massacre: The Beginning	Jonathan Liebesman	Lukas Ettlin	Jonathan Chibnall	Executive Producer and Colorist	Dailies Colorist: John Zaik Additional Colorists: Mark Todd Osborne, Jimmy Tom, Joe Pestana
2006	Déjà Vu	Tony Scott	Paul Cameron	Chris Lebenzon	Executive Producer and Colorist	
2006	Dreamgirls	Bill Condon	Tobias Schliessler	Virginia Katz	Executive Producer and Colorist	Technicolor Preview Colorist: Stephen Nakamura
2007	300	Zack Snyder	Larry Fong	William Hoy	Producer/Colorist	Digital Intermediate Producer: Des Carey HPA Award – Best Color Grading (Feature Film)
2007	The Hitcher	Dave Meyers	James Hawkinson	Jim May	Executive Producer/Colorist	Additional Colorist/Dailies Colorist: John Zaik
2007	Shooter	Antoine Fuqua	Peter Menzies Jr.	Conrad Buff & Eric Sears	Executive Producer/Colorist	Assistant Colorist: Jimmy Tom Color Timer: Jim Passon
2007	Blades of Glory	Will Speck and Josh Gordon	Stefan Czapsky	Richard Pearson	Executive Producer	DI Colorist: Sean Coleman Film Colorist: Jim Passon
2007	Pirates of the Caribbean: At World's End	Gore Verbinski	Dariusz Wolski	Craig Wood, Stephen E. Rivkin Additional Editor: Daniel P. Hanley	Executive Producer/Colorist	Digital Intermediate Assistant: Dan Goslee Dailies Colorists: Mark Todd Osborne, Adrian DeLude
2007	Transformers	Michael Bay	Mitchell Amundsen	Paul Rubell, Glen Scantlebury, Thomas Muldoon Additional Editors: John Murray, Todd E. Miller	Executive Producer/Colorist	Dailies Colorist: Adrian DeLude DI Assists: Will Harris, Dan Goslee
2007	Rush Hour 3	Brett Ratner	J. Michael Muro	Mark Helfrich, Don Zimmerman, Dean Zimmerman	Executive Producer for Company 3/Colorist	Digital Intermediate Supervisors: Christine Carr, Nick Monton EFilm Color Timer: Jim Passon
2007	Into the Wild	Sean Penn	Eric Gautier	Jay Cassidy	Executive Producer for Company 3/Colorist	Additional Colorist: Adrian DeLude Deluxe Color Timer: Chris Regan
2007	Mr. Woodcock	Craig Gillespie, David Dobkin	Tami Reiker	Alan Baumgarten	Executive Producer for Company 3/Colorist	
2007	The Game Plan	Andy Fickman	Greg Gardiner	Michael Jablow	CO3 Executive Producer/Colorist	Additional Colorist: Adrian DeLude Digital Intermediate Assistants: Todd Crawford, Jorge Tanaka
2007	Slipstream	Anthony Hopkins	Dante Spinotti	Michael R. Miller	Executive Producer for Company 3/Colorist	Additional Colorists: Dave Francis, Mark Todd Osborne
2007	Fred Claus	David Dobkin	Remi Adefarasin	Mark Livolsi	Colorist/Digital Intermediate HOD (with Rob Pizzey (Color) & Patrick Malone (HOD))	Digital Intermediate completed at both CO3 in Los Angeles & One Post in London Digital Intermediate Technical Director: Laurent Treherne
2007	Sweeney Todd: The Demon Barber of Fleet Street	Tim Burton	Dariusz Wolski	Chris Lebenzon	Executive Producer for Company 3/Colorist Additional Colorist: Rob Pizzey	Digital Intermediate Colorist: Stuart Fyvie Digital Intermediate completed at One Post (London), Company 3 (Los Angeles) & Lipsync Post
2007	National Treasure: Book of Secrets	Jon Turteltaub	John Schwartzman, Amir Mokri	William Goldenberg, David Rennie	Executive Producer/Colorist	Color Timer: Kurt Smith Dailies Colorist: Mark Todd Osborne
2008	Cloverfield	Matt Reeves	Michael Bonvillain	Kevin Stitt	Executive Producer/Colorist	
2008	Untraceable	Gregory Hoblit	Anastas Michos	David Rosenbloom	CO3 Executive Producer	Colorist: Siggy Ferstl
2008	Greener Mountains	Lee Shallat Chemel	Greg Harrington	Kristina Wisener, Kristina Trirogoff Co-Editor: Alex Hepburn	Telecine Artist	
2008	Deception	Marcel Langenegger	Dante Spinotti	Douglas Crise, Christian Wagner	CO3 Executive Producer/Colorist	
2008	The Mummy: Tomb of the Dragon Emperor	Rob Cohen	Simon Duggan	Joel Negron, Kelly Matsumoto	Executive Producer/Colorist	Dailies Colorists: Mark Todd Osborne, Dave Lee Dailies Assistant: Joe Pestana
2008	The Hurt Locker	Kathryn Bigelow	Barry Ackroyd	Bob Murawski & Chris Innis	CO3 Executive Producer	Colorist: Stephen Nakamura
2008	Eagle Eye	D. J. Caruso	Dariusz Wolski	Jim Page	Colorist	
2008	Flash of Genius	Marc Abraham	Dante Spinotti	Jill Savitt	Colorist	
2008	What Just Happened	Barry Levinson	Stéphane Fontaine	Hank Corwin	Colorist	
2008	Body of Lies	Ridley Scott	Alexander Witt	Pietro Scalia	CO3 Executive Producer	Colorist: Stephen Nakamura
2009	The Unborn	David S. Goyer	James Hawkinson	Jeff Betancourt	Colorist	
2009	He's Just Not That Into You	Ken Kwapis	John Bailey	Cara Silverman	Digital Intermediate Colorist	Digital Intermediate Supervisor: Erik Rogers EFilm Film Color Timer: Harry Muller
2009	Two Lovers	James Gray	Joaquin Baca-Asay	John Axelrad	CO3 Executive Producer/Colorist	
2009	Confessions of a Shopaholic	P. J. Hogan	Jo Willems	William Goldenberg	CO3 Executive Producer/Colorist	
2009	Friday the 13th	Marcus Nispel	Daniel Pearl	Ken Blackwell Additional Editor: Glen Scantlebury	Company 3 Executive Producer/Colorist	Company 3 DI Assists: Dan Goslee, James Cody Baker, Joe Pestana Technicolor Color Timer: Steve Sheridan
2009	Watchmen	Zack Snyder	Larry Fong	William Hoy	Producer/Colorist	Telecine Assist: John Brandon Digital Intermediate Producer: Des Carey
2009	Horsemen	Jonas Åkerlund	Eric Broms	Jim May, Todd E. Miller	CO3 Executive Producer/Colorist	Visual Effects & Digital Intermediate by Company 3
2009	Fast & Furious 4	Justin Lin	Amir Mokri	Fred Raskin, Christian Wagner	Executive Producer/Colorist	DI Producer: Des Carey 2019 HDR Remaster Colorist: Andre Rivas
2009	Drag Me to Hell	Sam Raimi	Peter Deming	Bob Murawski	Executive Producer	Colorist: Stephen Nakamura DI Assistants: Jeremiah Morey, Dan Goslee
2009	Star Trek	J. J. Abrams	Dan Mindel	Maryann Brandon, Mary Jo Markey	Executive Producer for Company 3/Colorist	Digital Intermediate Assist: James Cody Baker FotoKem Video Dailies Colorist: Greg Curry
2009	Terminator Salvation	Joseph McGinty Nichol	Shane Hurlbut	Conrad Buff	Executive Producer for Company 3/Colorist	
2009	The Taking of Pelham 123	Tony Scott	Tobias Schliessler	Chris Lebenzon	Executive Producer for Company 3/Colorist	
2009	Transformers: Revenge of the Fallen	Michael Bay	Ben Seresin	Roger Barton, Paul Rubell, Joel Negron, Thomas Muldoon Additional Editor: Glen Scantlebury	CO3 Executive Producer/Colorist Digital Intermediate Assists: James Cody Baker, Dan Goslee	Dailies Colorist: Adrian Delude Dailies Assist: Brandon Mikulka
2009	Public Enemies	Michael Mann	Dante Spinotti	Paul Rubell, Jeffrey Ford	CO3 Executive Producer/Colorist	
2009	G-Force	Hoyt Yeatman	Bojan Bazelli	Jason Hellmann, Mark Goldblatt	CO3 Executive Producer/Colorist	DI Assist: James Cody Baker 3D DI Color Assistants: Jordan Fox, Peter King
2009	Funny People	Judd Apatow	Janusz Kamiński	Brent White, Craig Alpert	CO3 Executive Producer/Colorist	
2009	G.I. Joe: The Rise of Cobra	Stephen Sommers	Mitchell Amundsen	Bob Ducsay, Jim May, Kelly Matsumoto	Executive Producer/Colorist	Digital Intermediate Assists: Jeremiah Morey, Dan Goslee, James Cody Baker Deluxe Color Timer: Harry Mullee
2009	Whiteout	Dominic Sena	Christopher Soos	Martin Hunter	CO3 Executive Producer/Colorist	
2009	Surrogates	Jonathan Mostow	Oliver Wood	Kevin Stitt	CO3 Executive Producer	Colorist: Stephen Nakamura
2009	Law Abiding Citizen	F. Gary Gray	Jonathan Sela	Tariq Anwar	CO3 Executive Producer	Digital Intermediate Colorist: Stephen Nakamura Digital Color Assistants: Jordan Fox, Peter King
2009	The Killing Room	Jonathan Liebesman	Lukas Ettlin	Sean Carter	Digital Colorist	
2009	New York, I Love You	Brett Ratner	Paweł Edelman	Mark Helfrich	Digital Colorist	Segment: "Brett Ratner"
2009	Where the Wild Things Are	Spike Jonze	Lance Acord	Eric Zumbrunnen, James Haygood	Colorist (with Adam Inglis)	Digital Intermediate finishing completed at Company 3 & Framestore Digital Finishing Supervisor: Des Carey
2010	The Crazies	Breck Eisner	Maxime Alexandre	Billy Fox	Digital Colorist	
2010	Alice in Wonderland	Tim Burton	Dariusz Wolski	Chris Lebenzon	Digital Colorist	3D Digital Intermediate Color Assist: Travis Flynn HPA Award – Outstanding Color Grading Using a DI Process
2010	A Nightmare on Elm Street	Samuel Bayer	Jeff Cutter	Glen Scantlebury	Digital Colorist	
2010	Prince of Persia: The Sands of Time	Mike Newell	John Seale	Michael Kahn, Martin Walsh, Mick Audsley	Digital Colorist	Digital Intermediate completed by Ascent 142
2010	High School	John Stalberg Jr.	Mitchell Amundsen	Gabriel Wrye	Digital Colorist	
2010	Get Him to the Greek	Nicholas Stoller	Robert Yeoman	William Kerr, Michael L. Sale	Digital Film Colorist	Digital Intermediate Producer: Des Carey On Line Editor: Salvatore Catanzaro
2010	The Sorcerer's Apprentice	Jon Turteltaub	Bojan Bazelli	William Goldenberg	CO3 Executive Producer/Colorist	
2010	Life as We Know It	Greg Berlanti	Andrew Dunn	Jim Page	CO3 Executive Producer/Colorist	
2010	Welcome to the Rileys	Jake Scott	Christopher Soos	Nicolas Gaster	CO3 Executive Producer/Colorist	
2010	Morning Glory	Roger Michell	Alwin H. Küchler	Dan Farrell, Nick Moore, Steven Weisberg	CO3 Executive Producer/Colorist	
2010	Unstoppable	Tony Scott	Ben Seresin	Chris Lebenzon, Robert Duffy	Digital Colorist	
2011	Season of the Witch	Dominic Sena	Amir Mokri	Mark Helfrich, Dan Zimmerman	Digital Colorist	
2011	No Strings Attached	Ivan Reitman	Rogier Stoffers	Dana E. Glauberman	CO3 Executive Producer	Colorist: Scott Gregory DI Assists: Dan Goslee, Paul Sage
2011	The Green Hornet	Michel Gondry	John Schwartzman	Michael Tronick	Digital Colorist	Digital Intermediate Color Assistant: Jordan Fox 3D Digital Intermediate Color Assist: Travis Flynn
2011	The Mechanic	Simon West	Erik Schmidt	T. G. Herrington, Todd E. Miller	CO3 Executive Producer	Colorist: Siggy Ferstl
2011	I Am Number Four	D. J. Caruso	Guillermo Navarro	Vince Filippone, Jim Page	CO3 Executive Producer/Colorist	
2011	Rango	Gore Verbinski	Roger Deakins (Cinematography Consultant), Rafael Sánchez (Emotion Capture Unit)	Craig Wood	Executive Producer for Company 3/Colorist	Digital Intermediate Assist: Dan Goslee Color Timer: Jim Passon
2011	The Lincoln Lawyer	Brad Furman	Lukas Ettlin	Jeff McEvoy	CO3 Executive Producer	Colorists: Siggy Ferstl, Shane Harris
2011	Sucker Punch	Zack Snyder	Larry Fong	William Hoy	Producer/Colorist	Color Timers: Jim Passon, Lee Wimer Digital Intermediate Assistant: Paul Sage
2011	Bridesmaids	Paul Feig	Robert Yeoman	William Kerr, Michael L. Sale	Producer/Colorist	
2011	Pirates of the Caribbean: On Stranger Tides	Rob Marshall	Dariusz Wolski	David Brenner, Wyatt Smith	CO3 Executive Producer/Colorist	Additional Colorist: Stephen Nakamura
2011	Super 8	J. J. Abrams	Larry Fong	Maryann Brandon, Mary Jo Markey	CO3 Executive Producer/Colorist	
2011	Transformers: Dark of the Moon	Michael Bay	Amir Mokri	Roger Barton, William Goldenberg, Joel Negron	CO3 Executive Producer/Colorist	Color Assist: James Cody Baker, Dan Goslee, Travis Flynn, Paul Sage Dailies Colorist: Adrian Delude
2011	The Horseman	Steven Kastrissios	Mark Broadbent	Steven Kastrissios	CO3 Executive Producer/Colorist	
2011	The Change-Up	David Dobkin	Eric Edwards	Lee Haxall, Greg Hayden	CO3 Executive Producer/Colorist	
2011	Fright Night	Craig Gillespie	Javier Aguirresarobe	Tatiana S. Riegel	Executive Producer for Company 3/Colorist	Color Assistants: Travis Flynn, Jordan Fox Sixteen19 Digital Dailies Colorist: Alex Bickel
2011	Conan the Barbarian	Marcus Nispel	Thomas Kloss	Ken Blackwell	CO3 Executive Producer	Colorist: Rob Sciarratta
2011	Machine Gun Preacher	Marc Forster	Roberto Schaefer	Matt Chessé	CO3 Executive Producer	Colorist: Stephen Nakamura
2011	The Rum Diary	Bruce Robinson	Dariusz Wolski	Carol Littleton	CO3 Executive Producer/Colorist	Additional Colorist: Ryan Bennett
2011	Tower Heist	Brett Ratner	Dante Spinotti	Mark Helfrich	Company 3 Executive Producer/Colorist	DI Assist: Alex Brownley Lab Color Timer: Jim Passon
2011	Mission: Impossible – Ghost Protocol	Brad Bird	Robert Elswit	Paul Hirsch	CO3 Executive Producer/Colorist	Additional Colorist: Stephen Nakamura
2011	Extremely Loud & Incredibly Close	Stephen Daldry	Chris Menges	Claire Simpson	CO3 Executive Producer/Colorist	
2012	Underworld: Awakening	Måns Mårlind, Björn Stein	Scott Kevan	Jeff McEvoy	CO3 Executive Producer	Colorist: Siggy Ferstl
2012	Wanderlust	David Wain	Michael Bonvillain	David Moritz, Robert Nassau	CO3 Executive Producer/Colorist (with Stephen Nakamura)	
2012	The Five-Year Engagement	Nicholas Stoller	Javier Aguirresarobe	William Kerr, Peck Prior	Colorist	
2012	Prometheus	Ridley Scott	Dariusz Wolski	Pietro Scalia	Executive Producer for Company 3 Digital Intermediate Colorist: Stephen Nakamura	Digital Intermediate Assist: Giovanni DiGiorgio 3D Convergence Artist: Travis Flynn
2012	Battleship	Peter Berg	Tobias Schliessler	Colby Parker Jr., Billy Rich, Paul Rubell	Colorist	Digital Conform: Matthew Johnson Color Timer: Jim Passon
2012	Savages	Oliver Stone	Dan Mindel	Joe Hutshing, Stuart Levy, Alex Marquez	CO3 Executive Producer/Colorist	
2012	The Bourne Legacy	Tony Gilroy	Robert Elswit	John Gilroy	Digital Intermediate Colorist	Digital Intermediate Assistant: John Tripp Color Timer: Jim Passon
2012	Goats	Christopher Neil	Wyatt Troll	Jeremiah O'Driscoll	CO3 Executive Producer/Colorist	
2012	Branded	Jamie Bradshaw, Alexander Dulerayn	Rogier Stoffers	Michael Blackburn	Co3 Executive Producer	Digital Intermediate Colorist: Scott Gregory Digital Color Assistants: Travis Flynn, Jordan Fox
2012	Alex Cross	Rob Cohen	Ricardo Della Rosa	Matt Diezel, Thom Noble	CO3 Executive Producer/Colorist	
2012	The Sessions	Ben Lewin	Geoffrey Simpson	Lisa Bromwell	Executive Producer for Company 3	DI Colorist: Siggy Ferstl Additional Colorist: Travis Flynn
2012	Red Dawn	Dan Bradley	Mitchell Amundsen	Richard Pearson	CO3 Executive Producer/Colorist	
2012	This is 40	Judd Apatow	Phedon Papamichael	Brent White, Jay Deuby & David Bertman	CO3 Executive Producer/Colorist	
2013	The Last Stand	Kim Jee-woon	Kim Je-yong	Steven Kemper	CO3 Executive Producer/Colorist	
2013	Hansel & Gretel: Witch Hunters	Tommy Wirkola	Michael Bonvillain	Jim Page	CO3 Executive Producer/Colorist	
2013	Broken City	Allen Hughes	Ben Seresin	Cindy Mollo	CO3 Executive Producer/Colorist	
2013	G.I. Joe: Retaliation	Jon M. Chu	Stephen F. Windon	Roger Barton & Jim May	CO3 Executive Producer/Colorist	
2013	Pain and Gain	Michael Bay	Ben Seresin	Thomas Muldoon & Joel Negron	CO3 Executive Producer/Colorist	
2013	Star Trek Into Darkness	J. J. Abrams	Dan Mindel	Maryann Brandon & Mary Jo Markey	CO3 Executive Producer/Colorist	
2013	The Purge	James DeMonaco	Jacques Jouffret	Peter Gvozdas	CO3 Executive Producer/Colorist	
2013	Man of Steel	Zack Snyder	Amir Mokri	David Brenner	Producer/Colorist	Dailies Colorist: Adrian DeLude Dailies Assistant: Joe Pestana
2013	The Lone Ranger	Gore Verbinski	Bojan Bazelli	Craig Wood, James Haygood	CO3 Executive Producer/Colorist	Additional Colorist: Sofie Friis Borup Color Assist: Giovanni DiGiorgio
2013	Red 2	Dean Parisot	Enrique Chediak	Don Zimmerman	CO3 Executive Producer/Colorist	Company 3 Color Assistant: J. Cody Baker Deluxe 142 Supervising Colourist (Dailies): Darren Rae
2013	Blue Jasmine	Woody Allen	Javier Aguirresarobe	Alisa Lepselter	DI Colorist/Executive Producer	DI Supervising Producer: Darrell R. Smith DI Color Assistant: Giovanni DiGiorgio
2013	The Fifth Estate	Bill Condon	Tobias Schliessler	Virginia Katz	CO3 Executive Producer/Colorist	
2013	Runner Runner	Brad Furman	Mauro Fiore	Jeff McEvoy	CO3 Executive Producer/Colorist	
2013	Last Vegas	Jon Turteltaub	David Hennings	David Rennie	CO3 Executive Producer/Colorist	
2013	Oldboy	Spike Lee	Sean Bobbitt	Barry Alexander Brown Additional Editor: Paul Hirsch	CO3 Executive Producer	Colorist: Tom Poole Color Assistant: Giovanni DiGiorgio
2013	The Secret Life of Walter Mitty	Ben Stiller	Stuart Dryburgh	Greg Hayden	CO3 Executive Producer/Colorist	Color Assistant: Giovanni DiGiorgio Dailies Colorist: Sean Dunckley
2013	Saving Mr. Banks	John Lee Hancock	John Schwartzman	Mark Livolsi	CO3 Executive Producer/Colorist	
2013	Lone Survivor	Peter Berg	Tobias Schliessler	Colby Parker Jr.	CO3 Executive Producer/Colorist	
2014	God's Pocket	John Slattery	Lance Acord	Tom McArdle	CO3 Executive Producer/Colorist	
2014	300: Rise of an Empire	Noam Murro	Simon Duggan	Wyatt Smith & David Brenner	CO3 Executive Producer/Colorist	
2014	The Amazing Spider-Man 2	Marc Webb	Dan Mindel	Pietro Scalia	Company 3 Supervising Color Consultant	Lead Dailies Colorist: Andrew Geary HDR Mastering Colorist: David Bernstein
2014	Million Dollar Arm	Craig Gillespie	Gyula Pados	Tatiana S. Riegel	CO3 Executive Producer/Colorist	
2014	Transformers: Age of Extinction	Michael Bay	Amir Mokri	William Goldenberg, Roger Barton & Paul Rubell	CO3 Executive Producer/Colorist	DI Assistant: John Tripp Dailies Colorist: Shane Harris
2014	Dawn of the Planet of the Apes	Matt Reeves	Michael Seresin	William Hoy & Stan Salfas	CO3 Executive Producer/Colorist	Additional Colorist: Shane Harris
2014	The Purge: Anarchy	James DeMonaco	Jacques Jouffret	Todd E. Miller & Vince Filippone	CO3 Executive Producer/Colorist	Colorist: Siggy Ferstl Color Assistant: Jared Pecht
2014	Hercules	Brett Ratner	Dante Spinotti	Mark Helfrich & Julia Wong	CO3 Executive Producer/Colorist	
2014	Teenage Mutant Ninja Turtles	Jonathan Liebesman	Lula Carvalho	Joel Negron & Glen Scantlebury	CO3 Executive Producer/Colorist	
2014	Let's Be Cops	Luke Greenfield	Daryn Okada	Bill Pankow & Jonathan Schwartz	Company 3 Executive Producer	Digital Intermediate Colorist: Tom Poole Dailies Colorist: John Petersen
2014	Dead Snow 2: Red vs. Dead	Tommy Wirkola	Matthew Weston	Martin Stoltz	CO3 Executive Producer/Colorist	
2014	Trash	Stephen Daldry	Adriano Goldman	Elliot Graham	CO3 Executive Producer/Colorist	
2014	Dracula Untold	Gary Shore	John Schwartzman	Richard Pearson	CO3 Executive Producer/Colorist	
2014	The Imitation Game	Morten Tyldum	Óscar Faura	William Goldenberg	CO3 Executive Producer/Colorist	
2014	Seventh Son	Sergei Bodrov	Newton Thomas Sigel	Paul Rubell, Jim Page, Michael Kahn	CO3 Executive Producer	Colorist: Stephen Nakamura 3D Convergence Artist: Travis Flynn
2015	Blackhat	Michael Mann	Stuart Dryburgh	Joe Walker, Stephen E. Rivkin, Jeremiah O'Driscoll & Mako Kamitsuna	Supervising Colorist	
2015	Project Almanac	Dean Israelite	Matthew J. Lloyd	Julian Clarke & Martin Bernfeld	CO3 Executive Producer/Colorist	
2015	The DUFF	Ari Sandel	David Hennings	Wendy Greene Bricmont	CO3 Executive Producer/Colorist	
2015	Cinderella	Kenneth Branagh	Haris Zambarloukos	Martin Walsh	CO3 Executive Producer	Supervising Colorist: Rob Pizzey Additional Colorist: Trevor Brown
2015	Entourage	Doug Ellin	Steven Fierberg	Jeff Groth	Senior Colorist	Color Assistant: Arianna Shining Star Dailies Colorist: David Lee
2015	Jurassic World	Colin Trevorrow	John Schwartzman	Kevin Stitt Additional Editor: Stephen M. Rickert Jr.	Colorist	Color Assistant: James Cody Baker Dailies Colorist: Ben Estrada
2015	Mr. Holmes	Bill Condon	Tobias Schliessler	Virginia Katz	CO3 Executive Producer/Colorist	
2015	Trainwreck	Judd Apatow	Jody Lee Lipes	William Kerr & Paul Zucker	CO3 Executive Producer/Colorist	
2015	Pixels	Chris Columbus	Amir Mokri	Hughes Winborne	DI Colorist Additional Colorist: J. Cody Baker	DI Producer: Morning Star Schott Color Assistant: Arianna Smaller
2015	Mission: Impossible – Rogue Nation	Christopher McQuarrie	Robert Elswit	Eddie Hamilton	CO3 Executive Producer/Supervising Colorist	Colorist: Greg Fisher
2015	Everest	Baltasar Kormákur	Salvatore Totino	Mick Audsley	CO3 Executive Producer/Colorist	Co-Colorist: Greg Fisher
2015	The Martian	Ridley Scott	Dariusz Wolski	Pietro Scalia	CO3 Executive Producer	Colourist: Stephen Nakamura Colour Assistants: James Cody Baker, Lucie Barbier, Chris Francis
2015	He Named Me Malala	Davis Guggenheim	Erich Roland	Greg Finton, Brian Johnson & Brad Fuller	CO3 Executive Producer/Colorist	
2015	The Last Witch Hunter	Breck Eisner	Dean Semler	Dean Zimmerman & Chris Lebenzon	CO3 Executive Producer/Colorist	
2015	Star Wars: The Force Awakens	J. J. Abrams	Dan Mindel	Maryann Brandon & Mary Jo Markey	CO3 Executive Producer/Colorist	Assistant Colorist: J. Cody Baker Dailies Colorists: Darren Rae, Dave Lee
2016	13 Hours: The Secret Soldiers of Benghazi	Michael Bay	Dion Beebe	Pietro Scalia, Michael McCusker & Calvin Wimmer	CO3 Supervisor/Colorist	
2016	The Boy	William Brent Bell	Karl Walter Lindenlaub	Brian Berdan	CO3 Executive Producer	Colorist: Siggy Ferstl Color Assistant: John Tripp
2016	The Finest Hours	Craig Gillespie	Javier Aguirresarobe	Tatiana S. Riegel	CO3 Executive Producer/Colorist	
2016	Zoolander 2	Ben Stiller	Dan Mindel	Greg Hayden	CO3 Executive Supervisor/Colorist	
2016	Gods of Egypt	Alex Proyas	Peter Menzies Jr.	Richard Learoyd	CO3 Executive Supervisor/Colorist	Additional Colorist: Jill Bogdanowicz
2016	10 Cloverfield Lane	Dan Trachtenberg	Jeff Cutter	Stefan Grube	CO3 Executive Supervisor	Colorist: J. Cody Baker
2016	The Divergent Series: Allegiant	Robert Schwentke	Florian Ballhaus	Stuart Levy	CO3 Executive Producer	Colorist: Paul Ensby Color Assistants: John Tripp, Jared Pecht
2016	Batman v Superman: Dawn of Justice	Zack Snyder	Larry Fong	David Brenner	Producer/Colorist	Color Assists: John Tripp, Arianna Shining Star Dailies Colorists: Dave Lee, Joe Pestana, Alden Delos Santos
2016	I Saw the Light	Marc Abraham	Dante Spinotti	Alan Heim	Colorist	
2016	Alice Through the Looking Glass	James Bobin	Stuart Dryburgh	Andrew Weisblum	CO3 Executive Producer/Colorist	
2016	Teenage Mutant Ninja Turtles: Out of the Shadows	Dave Green	Lula Carvalho	Jim May, Debra Neil-Fisher & Bob Ducsay	CO3 Supervisor/Colorist	Additional Colorist: Jill Bogdanowicz
2016	The Purge: Election Year	James DeMonaco	Jacques Jouffret	Todd E. Miller	CO3 Executive Producer/Supervising Colorist	Colorist: Rob Sciarratta Color Assistants: Brett Price, Giovanni DiGiorgio
2016	Don't Breathe	Fede Álvarez	Pedro Luque	Eric L. Beason, Louise Ford & Gardner Gould	CO3 Executive Producer	Colorist: Siggy Ferstl
2016	The Oath	Baltasar Kormákur	Óttar Guðnason	Sigvaldi J. Kárason	Colorist	
2016	Bridget Jones's Baby	Sharon Maguire	Andrew Dunn	Melanie Ann Oliver	CO3 Executive Producer	Colorists: Greg Fisher & Paul Ensby
2016	The Magnificent Seven	Antoine Fuqua	Mauro Fiore	John Refoua	CO3 Executive Producer/Colorist	
2016	Deepwater Horizon	Peter Berg	Enrique Chediak	Colby Parker Jr. & Gabriel Fleming	CO3 Executive Producer/Colorist Colorist: Stephen Nakamura	Color Assistants: Brett Price, Giovanni DiGiorgio
2016	Ouija: Origin of Evil	Mike Flanagan	Michael Fimognari	Mike Flanagan	CO3 Executive Producer/Supervising Colorist	Colorist: Jill Bogdanowicz Color Assistants: Cody Baker, John Tripp
2016	Keeping Up with the Joneses	Greg Mottola	Andrew Dunn	David Rennie	CO3 Executive Producer	Supervising Colorist: Tom Poole Colorist: Andrew Geary
2016	Underworld: Blood Wars	Anna Foerster	Karl Walter Lindenlaub	Peter Amundson	CO3 Executive Producer	Colorist: Siggy Ferstl
2016	Patriots Day	Peter Berg	Tobias A. Schliessler	Colby Parker Jr. & Gabriel Fleming	CO3 Executive Producer/Colorist	
2016	Why Him?	John Hamburg	Kris Kachikis	William Kerr & Dean Zimmerman	Digital Colorist	Digital Intermediate Project Manager: Hershel Cohen Color Assistants: Jordan "Coach" Schulz, Giovanni DiGiorgio, John Tripp
2016	Assassin's Creed	Justin Kurzel	Adam Arkapaw	Christopher Tellefsen	CO3 Executive Producer	Digital Intermediate Colorist: Tom Poole Additional Color: Greg Fisher
2016	Gold	Stephen Gaghan	Robert Elswit	Douglas Crise & Rick Grayson	CO3 Executive Producer/Colorist	

=== 2017 ===
Title	Director(s)	Cinematographer(s)	Editor(s)	Roles	Other notes
XXX: Return of Xander Cage	D. J. Caruso	Russell Carpenter	Jim Page, Vince Filippone	CO3 Executive Producer/Colorist	
The Founder	John Lee Hancock	John Schwartzman	Robert Frazen	CO3 Executive Producer/Colorist	
Fifty Shades Darker	James Foley	John Schwartzman	Richard Francis-Bruce	CO3 Executive Producer/Colorist	
John Wick: Chapter 2	Chad Stahelski	Dan Laustsen	Evan Schiff	CO3 Executive Producer	Colorist: Jill Bogdanowicz
Beauty and the Beast	Bill Condon	Tobias Schliessler	Virginia Katz	CO3 Executive Producer/Colorist	
Power Rangers	Dean Israelite	Matthew J. Lloyd	Martin Bernfeld & Dody Dorn	CO3 Executive Producer/Colorist Company 3 Color Assistants: Danny Keefe, Giovanni DiGiorgio	Encore Vancouver Dailies Colorist: Jaan Spirka Encore Vancouver Color Consultant: Sean Coleman
Gifted	Marc Webb	Stuart Dryburgh	Bill Pankow	CO3 Executive Producer/Colorist	
Heat	Michael Mann	Dante Spinotti	Dov Hoenig, Pasquale Buba, William Goldenberg & Tom Rolf	CO3 Executive Producer/Colorist	Originally released in 1995. Remastered in 4K in 2016 with Mann supervising the transfer
Pirates of the Caribbean: Dead Men Tell No Tales	Joachim Rønning & Espen Sandberg	Paul Cameron	Roger Barton & Leigh Folsom-Boyd	CO3 Executive Producer/Colorist	
Wonder Woman	Patty Jenkins	Matthew Jensen	Martin Walsh	Digital Intermediate Colourist	Colour Assistants: Giovanni DiGiorgio (US), Tyrell Lloyd (US), John A. Maltby (UK Dailies), Lucie Barbier (UK), Chris Francis (UK), Jonas Jangvad (UK) Dailies Colourist: James Slattery
The Mummy	Alex Kurtzman	Ben Seresin	Paul Hirsch, Gina Hirsch, Andrew Mondshein	Executive Producer/Colorist	Digital Conform: Joe Ken Color Assistant: John Tripp
The Book of Henry	Colin Trevorrow	John Schwartzman	Kevin Stitt	CO3 Executive Producer/Colorist	
Transformers: The Last Knight	Michael Bay	Jonathan Sela	Mark Sanger, John Refoua, Debra Neil-Fisher, Roger Barton, Adam Gerstel, Calvin Wimmer Additional Editor: Julie Monroe	CO3 Executive Producer/Colorist EC3 Colorist: Adrian Delude	3D Convergence Artist: Jared Pecht Color Assistants: John Tripp, Giovanni DiGiorgio
The Last Face	Sean Penn	Barry Ackroyd	Jay Cassidy	CO3 Executive Producer/Colorist	
The Only Living Boy in New York	Marc Webb	Stuart Dryburgh	Tim Streeto	CO3 Executive Producer/Colorist	Additional Colorist: Andrew Geary
American Assassin	Michael Cuesta	Enrique Chediak	Conrad Buff IV	CO3 Executive Producer/Colorist	
Bunker 77	Takuji Masuda	David Homcy & Anthony Kiedis	Matt Chessé & Tyler Hubby	CO3 Executive Producer/Colorist	
Suburbicon	George Clooney	Robert Elswit	Stephen Mirrione	CO3 Executive Producer/Colorist	
Roman J. Israel, Esq.	Dan Gilroy	Robert Elswit	Jon Gilroy	CO3 Executive Producer/Colorist	
Father Figures	Lawrence Sher	John Lindley	Dana E. Glauberman	CO3 Executive Producer	Company 3 Senior Digital Intermediate Colorist: Jill Bogdanowicz Color7 Preview Colorist: Mark Sachen

=== 2018 ===
Title	Director(s)	Cinematographer(s)	Editor(s)	Roles	Other notes
The Cloverfield Paradox	Julius Onah	Dan Mindel	Alan Baumgarten, Matt Evans, Rebecca Valente	CO3 Executive Producer/Colorist	
Fifty Shades Freed	James Foley	John Schwartzman	Richard Francis-Bruce, Debra Neil-Fisher & David Clark	CO3 Executive Producer/Colorist	
Red Sparrow	Francis Lawrence	Jo Willems	Alan Edward Bell	CO3 Executive Producer	Colorist: Dave Hussey Color Assistants: Tyrell Lloyd, John Tripp
A Quiet Place	John Krasinski	Charlotte Bruus Christensen	Christopher Tellefsen	CO3 Executive Producer/Colorist	
Pacific Rim Uprising	Steven S. DeKnight	Dan Mindel	Zach Staenberg, Dylan Highsmith & Josh Schaeffer	Executive Producer/Colorist	Company 3 Color Assistants: Tyrell Lloyd, John Tripp FotoKem NextLAB Colorist: Jon Roce
Adrift	Baltasar Kormákur	Robert Richardson	John Gilbert	CO3 Executive Producer/Colorist	
Sicario: Day of the Soldado	Stefano Sollima	Dariusz Wolski	Matthew Newman	CO3 Executive Producer	Colorist: Stephen Nakamura Color Assistants: Tyrell Lloyd, John Tripp
The First Purge	Gerard McMurray	Anastas Michos	Jim Page	CO3 Executive Producer	Colorist: Tim Stipan Color Assistant: Nicholas Figueroa
Skyscraper	Rawson Marshall Thurber	Robert Elswit	Michael L. Sale, Julian Clarke	CO3 Executive Producer/Colorist	Company 3 Color Assists: John Tripp, Tyrell Lloyd Encore Vancouver Dailies Colorist: Ed Twiford
The Equalizer II	Antoine Fuqua	Oliver Wood	Conrad Buff	CO3 Executive Producer/Colorist	
Christopher Robin	Marc Forster	Matthias Koenigswieser	Matt Chessé	CO3 Executive Producer	DI Colorist: Sofie Friis Borup Color Assistants: Tyrell Lloyd, Daniel Keefe
A Simple Favor	Paul Feig	John Schwartzman	Brent White	CO3 Executive Producer/Colorist	
Free Solo	Elizabeth Chai Vasarhelyi & Jimmy Chin	Jimmy Chin, Clair Popkin & Mikey Schaefer	Bob Eisenhardt	CO3 Executive Producer/Colorist	
A Star is Born	Bradley Cooper	Matthew Libatique	Jay Cassidy	CO3 Executive Producer/Colorist	
Venom	Ruben Fleischer	Matthew Libatique	Maryann Brandon & Alan Baumgarten	DI Colorist	Assistant Colorists: Vincent Ferro, Tyrell Lloyd Dailies Colorist: Ben Estrada
Halloween	David Gordon Green	Michael Simmonds	Tim Alverson	CO3 Executive Producer	Colorist: Tom Poole
Overlord	Julius Avery	Laurie Rose, Fabian Wagner	Matt Evans	CO3 Executive Producer/Colorist	Color Assistants: John Tripp, Tyrell Lloyd Dailies Colorist: James Slattery
Robin Hood	Otto Bathurst	George Steel	Joe Hutshing & Chris Barwell	CO3 Executive Producer/Colorist	

=== 2019 ===
Title	Director(s)	Cinematographer(s)	Editor(s)	Roles	Other notes
Velvet Buzzsaw	Dan Gilroy	Robert Elswit	John Gilroy	CO3 Executive Producer/Colorist	
Five Feet Apart	Justin Baldoni	Frank G. DeMarco	Angela M. Catanzaro	CO3 Executive Producer/Colorist	
Avengers: Endgame	Anthony and Joe Russo	Trent Opaloch	Jeffrey Ford, Matthew Schmidt Additional Editors: Craig Tanner, Tia Nolan, Peter S. Elliot	Executive Producer for Company 3	Creative Finishing Supervisor: Evan Jacobs Supervising Finishing Artist: Steven J. Scott
The Intruder	Deon Taylor	Daniel Pearl	Melissa Kent	Colorist	
John Wick: Chapter 3 – Parabellum	Chad Stahelski	Dan Laustsen	Evan Schiff	CO3 Executive Producer	Colorist: Jill Bogdanowicz
Dora and the Lost City of Gold	James Bobin	Javier Aguirresarobe	Mark Everson	Senior Colorist	Colorist: Paul Ensby
Maleficent: Mistress of Evil	Joachim Rønning	Henry Braham	Laura Jennings, Craig Wood	Colourist	Additional 2D Colourist: Paul Ensby Additional 3D Colourists: Adam Nazarenko, Jared Pecht
The Current War	Alfonso Gomez-Rejon	Chung Chung-hoon	David Trachtenberg, Justin Krohn	CO3 Executive Producer	Company 3 Colorist: Stephen Nakamura Technicolor Digital Intermediate Colourists: Alex Gascoigne, Jean Clement Soret
Last Christmas	Paul Feig	John Schwartzman	Brent White	CO3 Executive Producer/Colorist	Colorists: Paul Ensby (Finishing), James Slattery (Dailies) Color Assistants: Chris Francis, Jonas Jangvad, Shing Hong Chan, Brett Rayner
The Good Liar	Bill Condon	Tobias Schliessler	Virginia Katz	CO3 Executive Producer/Colorist	Additional Colorist: Andrew Geary
21 Bridges	Brian Kirk	Paul Cameron	Tim Murrell	CO3 Executive Producer	Colorist: Tom Poole
6 Underground	Michael Bay	Bojan Bazelli	William Goldenberg, Roger Barton, Calvin Wimmer	CO3 Executive Producer/Colorist	Additional Colorist: Bryan Smaller Color Assists: Zachary Korpi, Doug Yablun
Star Wars: The Rise of Skywalker	J. J. Abrams	Dan Mindel	Maryann Brandon, Stefan Grube	CO3 Executive Producer/Colorist	Additional Colorists: Adam Nazarenko, Jared Pecht Color Assistants: John Tripp, Doug Yablun, Zachary Korpi

=== 2020 ===
Title	Director(s)	Cinematographer(s)	Editor(s)	Roles	Other notes
Bad Boys for Life	Adil El Arbi and Bilall Fallah	Robrecht Heyvaert	Dan Lebental, Peter McNulty	DI Colorist (with Adam Nazarenko)	Additional Colorist: Bryan Smaller Dailies Colorist: Nicholas Winkelmann
The Rhythm Section	Reed Morano	Sean Bobbitt	Joan Sobel	CO3 Executive Producer	Colorist: Tom Poole
Birds of Prey (and the Fantabulous Emancipation of One Harley Quinn)	Cathy Yan	Matthew Libatique	Jay Cassidy, Evan Schiff	DI Colorist	Additional Color: Bryan Smaller, Ben Estrada, Shane O'Connor Color Assistants: Valance Eisleben, Ryan Shovey, Douglas Yablun
Timmy Failure: Mistakes Were Made	Tom McCarthy	Masanobu Takayanagi	Tom McArdle	CO3 Executive Producer	Colorist: Tom Poole
Bloodshot	David S. F. Wilson	Jacques Jouffret	Jim May	Digital Intermediate Colorist	Additional Color: Bryan Smaller, James Slattery Color Assistants: Aaron Bennett, Valance Eisleben, Ryan Shovey, Douglas Yablun
Stargirl	Julia Hart	Bryce Fortner	Shayar Bansali, Tracey Wadmore-Smith	CO3 Executive Producer	Colorist: Jill Bogdanowicz
The Half of It	Alice Wu	Greta Zozula	Ian Blume, Lee Percy	CO3 Executive Producer	Colorist: Sofie Borup Color Assistant: Emily Bailey
Top Gun	Tony Scott	Jeffrey Kimball	Chris Lebenzon, Billy Weber	Digital Remaster Colorist	Originally released in 1986. Remastered in 4K in 2020. Officially re-released in theaters on May 13, 2021.
The King of Staten Island	Judd Apatow	Robert Elswit	Jay Cassidy, William Kerr, Brian Scott Olds Additional Editor: Craig Herring	CO3 Executive Producer/Colorist	Additional Colorist: Parker Jarvie Digital Intermediate Color Assists: John Tripp, Aaron Bennett
Da 5 Bloods	Spike Lee	Newton Thomas Sigel	Adam Gough	CO3 Executive Producer	Colorist: Stephen Nakamura
Project Power	Henry Joost, Ariel Schulman	Michael Simmonds	Jeff McEvoy	CO3 Executive Producer	Colorist: Tom Poole Color Assistant: Jake White
Clouds	Justin Baldoni	Ben Kutchins	Brett M. Reid	Digital Intermediate Supervising Colorist	Additional Digital Intermediate Colorist: Charles Bunnag
Hillbilly Elegy	Ron Howard	Maryse Alberti	James D. Wilcox	CO3 Executive Producer	Colorist: Tim Stipan
Ma Rainey's Black Bottom	George C. Wolfe	Tobias Schliessler	Andrew Mondshein	CO3 Executive Producer/Colorist	Additional Colorist: Andrew Geary
Elyse	Stella Hopkins	Dante Spinotti	Bob Joyce	CO3 Executive Producer/Colorist	
The Prom	Ryan Murphy	Matthew Libatique	Peggy Tachdjian, Danielle Wang	CO3 Executive Producer	Supervising Finishing Artist: Steven J. Scott Finishing Artists: Adam Nazarenko, Charles Bunnag
The Midnight Sky	George Clooney	Martin Ruhe	Stephen Mirrione	CO3 Executive Producer/Colorist	Color Assistant: Doug Yablun Image Scientist: John Quartel
Songbird	Adam Mason	Jacques Jouffret	Geoffrey O'Brien	CO3 Executive Producer/Colorist	
Wonder Woman 1984	Patty Jenkins	Matthew Jensen	Richard Pearson	Digital Intermediate Supervising Colourist	Senior Colourist: Adam Nazarenko Lead Colourists: Paul Ensby, James Slattery

=== 2021 ===
Title	Director(s)	Cinematographer(s)	Editor(s)	Roles	Other notes
Palmer	Fisher Stevens	Tobias A. Schliessler	Geoffrey Richman	Colorist	
The Little Things	John Lee Hancock	John Schwartzman	Robert Frazen	Digital Intermediate Colorist	Digital Intermediate Producer: Erik Rogers Digital Intermediate Editor: Matthew W. Johnson
The White Tiger	Ramin Bahrani	Paolo Carnera	Ramin Bahrani, Tim Streeto	CO3 Executive Producer	Colorist: Tim Stipan Color Assistant: Patrick Devine
Chaos Walking	Doug Liman	Ben Seresin	Doc Crotzer	Supervising Colorist	Colorist: Tim Masick Additional Colorists: Jared Pecht, Andrew Geary
Operation Varsity Blues: The College Admissions Scandal	Chris Smith	Britton Foster	Jon Karmen	Supervising Colorist	Additional Colorist: Parker Jarvie
Zack Snyder's Justice League	Zack Snyder	Fabian Wagner	David Brenner, Dody Dorn Additional Editor: Carlos M. Castillón	Digital Intermediate Colourist	Additional Colourist: Adam Nazarenko Dailies Colourist: James Slattery
Godzilla vs. Kong	Adam Wingard	Ben Seresin	Josh Schaeffer Additional Editor: Bob Ducsay	CO3 Executive Producer/Colorist	Additional Colorist: Adam Nazarenko Additional 3D Colorist: Jared Pecht
Thunder Force	Ben Falcone	Barry Peterson	Tia Nolan	CO3 Executive Producer/Colorist	
Army of the Dead	Zack Snyder		Dody Dorn	CO3 Executive Producer/Colorist	Additional Colorists: Adam Nazarenko, Charles Bunnag Color Assistant: John Tripp
A Quiet Place Part II	John Krasinski	Polly Morgan	Michael P. Shawver Additional Editor: Christopher Rouse	CO3 Executive Producer/Colorist	Additional Colorist: Andrew Geary
Cruella	Craig Gillespie	Nicolas Karakatsanis	Tatiana S. Riegel	CO3 Executive Producer	Colorist: Tom Poole Color Assists: John Tripp (LA), Melina Smith (NY)
Infinite	Antoine Fuqua	Mauro Fiore	Conrad Buff IV	CO3 Executive Producer/Colorist	Additional Colorist: Adam Nazarenko
Black Widow	Cate Shortland	Gabriel Beristain	Matthew Schmidt, Leigh Folsom-Boyd	Executive Producer for Company 3	Creative Finishing Supervisor: Evan Jacobs Supervising Finishing Artist: Jill Bogdanowicz
Joe Bell	Reinaldo Marcus Green	Jacques Jouffret	Mark Sanger	CO3 Executive Producer/Colorist	Additional Colorist: Parker Jarvie
Snake Eyes	Robert Schwentke	Bojan Bazelli	Stuart Levy	CO3 Executive Producer	CO3 Colorist: Stephen Nakamura Color Assistant: John Tripp
Stillwater	Tom McCarthy	Masanobu Takayanagi	Tom McArdle	CO3 Executive Producer	Colorist: Tom Poole
The Suicide Squad	James Gunn	Henry Braham	Fred Raskin, Christian Wagner Additional Editor: Craig Alpert	Digital Intermediate Colorist	Additional Colorist: Adam Nazarenko
Flag Day	Sean Penn	Daniel Moder	Valdís Óskarsdóttir, Michelle Tesoro	Digital Intermediate Colorist	Additional Colorist: Parker Jarvie
Cinderella	Kay Cannon	Henry Braham	Stacey Schroeder	Digital Intermediate Colourist	Additional Colorist: Parker Jarvie Dailies Colourist: Doychin Margoevski
Shang-Chi and the Legend of the Ten Rings	Destin Daniel Cretton	Bill Pope	Nat Sanders, Elísabet Ronaldsdóttir, Harry Yoon	Executive Producer for Company 3	Creative Finishing Supervisor: Evan Jacobs Supervising Finishing Artist: Jill Bogdanowicz
Dear Evan Hansen	Stephen Chbosky	Brandon Trost	Anne McCabe	CO3 Executive Producer	Supervising Colorist: Tom Poole Colorist: Andrew Geary
The Guilty	Antoine Fuqua	Maz Makhani	Jason Ballantine	Colorist	Additional Colorist: Adam Nazarenko
Halloween Kills	David Gordon Green	Michael Simmonds	Tim Alverson	CO3 Executive Producer	Colorist: Tom Poole Color Assistant: Jake White
Paranormal Activity: Next of Kin	William Eubank	Pedro Luque	Todd E. Miller	CO3 Executive Producer	Supervising Digital Colorist: Mitch Paulson Color Assistant: Joel McWilliams
Eternals	Chloe Zhao	Ben Davis	Dylan Tichenor, Craig Wood	Executive Producer for Company 3	Creative Finishing Supervisor: Evan Jacobs Supervising Finishing Artist: Jill Bogdanowicz
Tick, Tick... Boom!	Lin-Manuel Miranda	Alice Brooks	Myron Kerstein, Andrew Weisblum	CO3 Executive Producer	Finishing Colorist: Stephen Nakamura Color Assistant: Emily Bailey
Ghostbusters: Afterlife	Jason Reitman	Eric Steelberg	Dana E. Glauberman, Nathan Orloff	Digital Colorist	Additional Colorist: Parker Jarvie Color Assistant: Michael Ochoa
King Richard	Reinaldo Marcus Green	Robert Elswit	Pamela Martin	Colorist (with Parker Jarvie)	
The Tender Bar	George Clooney	Martin Ruhe	Tanya M. Swerling	Colorist (with Parker Jarvie)	
Nightmare Alley	Guillermo del Toro	Dan Laustsen	Cam McLauchlin	CO3 Executive Producer/Colorist	Additional Colorists: Adam Nazarenko, Walter Volpatto Color Assistant: John Tripp

=== 2022 ===
Title	Director(s)	Cinematographer(s)	Editor(s)	Roles	Other notes
Uncharted	Ruben Fleischer	Chung Chung-hoon	Richard Pearson, Chris Lebenzon	Digital Colorist	Additional Colorist: Parker Jarvie Finishing Editor: Matthew W. Johnson
The Bubble	Judd Apatow	Ben Smithard	Dan Schalk, James Thomas	CO3 Executive Producer/Colorist	
Return to Space	Jimmy Chin & Elizabeth Chai Vasarhelyi	Kevin Garrison, Shana Hagan	Daniel Kohler	Supervising Colorist	Colorist: Andrew Geary
Ambulance	Michael Bay	Roberto De Angelis	Pietro Scalia, Doug Brandt, Calvin Wimmer Additional Editors: Paul Rubell, Ben Snyder, Roger Barton	CO3 Executive Producer/Colorist Additional Colorist: Tyler Roth	Color Assistant: John Tripp Dailies Colorist: Shane O'Connor
Father Stu	Rosalind Ross	Jacques Jouffret	Jeffrey M. Werner	Company 3 Executive Producer/Digital Intermediate Colorist	Additional Digital Intermediate Colorist: Parker Jarvie Digital Intermediate Color Assistant: John Tripp
The Survivor	Barry Levinson	George Steel	Douglas Crise	CO3 Executive Producer	Supervising Colorist: Tom Poole Finishing Colorist: Jenny Montgomery
Doctor Strange in the Multiverse of Madness	Sam Raimi	John Mathieson	Bob Murawski & Tia Nolan	CO3 Executive Producer	Creative Finishing Supervisor: Evan Jacobs Supervising Finishing Artist: Stephen Nakamura
Emergency	Carey Williams	Michael Dallatorre	Lam T. Nguyen	CO3 Executive Producer	Colorist: Mitch Paulson Color Assistants: Patrick Devine, Andrew Mirmanesh
Top Gun: Maverick	Joseph Kosinski	Claudio Miranda	Eddie Hamilton	CO3 Executive Producer/Colorist Additional Colorist: Adam Nazarenko	Color Assistants: Nick Nassif, Mike Ochoa Dailies Colorist: Richard Flores Jr
Jurassic World Dominion	Colin Trevorrow	John Schwartzman	Mark Sanger, Tania Goding Additional Editor: Erline O'Donovan-Clarke	CO3 Executive Producer/Colorist	2D Additional Colorists: Parker Jarvie & Matt Osborne 3D Additional Colorist: Alan Louis Gordon
Spiderhead	Joseph Kosinski	Claudio Miranda	Stephen Mirrione	CO3 Executive Producer/Colorist	Additional Colorist: Adam Nazarenko
The Man from Toronto	Patrick Hughes	Rob Hardy	Craig Alpert	CO3 Executive Producer/Colorist	Finishing Editor: Jason Saulog Dailies Colorist: Evan Spicer
Thor: Love and Thunder	Taika Waititi	Barry "Baz" Idoine	Matthew Schmidt, Peter S. Elliot, Tim Roche & Jennifer Vecchiarello	CO3 Executive Producer	Creative Finishing Supervisor: Evan Jacobs Supervising Finishing Artist: Jill Bogdanowicz
The Gray Man	Anthony and Joe Russo	Stephen F. Windon	Jeff Groth & Pietro Scalia	CO3 Executive Producer	Supervising Finishing Artist: Steven J. Scott Senior Finishing Artist: Andre Rivas
Nope	Jordan Peele	Hoyte van Hoytema	Nicholas Monsour	CO3 Executive Producer	Colorist: Greg Fisher Color Assistant: Cat Farquharson
Beast	Baltasar Kormákur	Philippe Rousselot	Jay Rabinowitz	CO3 Executive Producer/Colorist	Additional Colorists: Adam Nazarenko and Parker Jarvie
Katrina Babies	Edward Buckles Jr.		Fiona Otway, Luther Clement Lam	CO3 Executive Producer	Colorist: Jaime O'Bradovich Color Assistant: Nico Pucciarelli
Pinocchio	Robert Zemeckis	Don Burgess	Jesse Goldsmith & Mick Audsley	CO3 Executive Producer	Colorist: Jill Bogdanowicz Additional Color: Adam Nazarenko
Moonage Daydream	Brett Morgen			Company 3 Executive Producer	Colorist: Tyler Roth Color Assistant: Doug Yablun
Goodnight Mommy	Matt Sobel	Alexander Dynan	Michael Taylor, Maya Maffioli	CO3 Executive Producer	Colorist: Tim Masick Color Assistant: Patrick Devine
Blonde	Andrew Dominik	Chayse Irvin	Adam Robinson Additional Editor: Jennifer Lame	CO3 Executive Producer	Finishing Colorists: Tom Poole, Andrew Geary & Jake White Color Assistant: Ben White
Hocus Pocus 2	Anne Fletcher	Elliot Davis	Julia Wong	CO3 Executive Producer	Colorist: Natasha Leonnet Color Assistant: Kalvin Johnson
My Best Friend's Exorcism	Damon Thomas	Rob C. Givens	Brad Turner	CO3 Executive Producer	Finishing Colorist: Gareth Spensley Dailies Colorist: Scott Salamon
Mr. Harrigan's Phone	John Lee Hancock	John Schwartzman	Robert Frazen	CO3 Executive Producer/Colorist	Additional Colorist: Parker Jarvie Color Assistant: Frankie Hudson
Lyle, Lyle, Crocodile	Will Speck & Josh Gordon	Javier Aguirresarobe	Richard Pearson	Executive Producer/Colorist	Additional Colorist: Adam Nazarenko Finishing Producer: Tatianna Kroha
Amsterdam	David O. Russell	Emmanuel Lubezki	Jay Cassidy Additional Editors: Alan Baumgarten, Hank Corwin	CO3 Executive Producer	Supervising Digital Colorist: Mitch Paulson Additional Colorists: Tom Reiser, Andre Rivas
Luckiest Girl Alive	Mike Barker	Colin Watkinson	Nancy Richardson	CO3 Executive Producer	Finishing Colorist: Tim Masick Color Assistants: Emily Bailey, Mena Smith
The Curse of Bridge Hollow	Jeff Wadlow	David Hennings & James McMillan	Sean Albertson & Derek Ambrosi	Finishing Colorist Additional Color: Andrew Geary	Color Assistant: Jake White, Andrew Mirmanesh, Melina Smith Dailies Colorist: Marc Lulkin
The School for Good and Evil	Paul Feig	John Schwartzman	Brent White	CO3 Executive Producer/Colorist	Additional Colorist: James Slattery
Black Panther: Wakanda Forever	Ryan Coogler	Autumn Durald Arkapaw	Michael P. Shawver, Kelley Dixon, Jennifer Lame	CO3 Executive Producer	Creative Finishing Supervisor: Evan Jacobs Supervising Finishing Artist: Tom Poole
Stutz	Jonah Hill	Christopher Blauvelt	Nick Houy & Nicholas Ramirez	CO3 Executive Producer/Colorist	Additional Colorist: Jared Pecht Color Assistants: Frankie Hudson & Maley Boyl-Davis
The Menu	Mark Mylod	Peter Deming	Christopher Tellefsen	CO3 Executive Producer	Finishing Colorist: Tom Poole Lead Color Assistant: Melina Smith
Nanny	Nikyatu Jusu	Rina Yang	Robert Mead	CO3 Executive Producer	Colorist: Joseph Bicknell Color Assistant: Patrick Devine
Emancipation	Antoine Fuqua	Robert Richardson	Conrad Buff IV	CO3 Executive Producer/Colorist	Additional Colorist: Parker Jarvie
"Sr."	Chris Smith	Chris Smith & Kevin Ford	Kevin Ford, Daniel Koehler & Amanda Griffin	Supervising Colorist	Colorist: Parker Jarvie Additional Colorist: Adam Nazarenko
Spoiler Alert	Michael Showalter	Brian Burgoyne	Peter Teschner	CO3 Executive Producer	Finishing Colorist: Tim Stipan Dailies Colorist: Alex Kaufman
The Whale	Darren Aronofsky	Matthew Libatique	Andrew Weisblum	CO3 Executive Producer	Finishing Colorist: Tim Stipan Color Assistant: Patrick Devine
Babylon	Damien Chazelle	Linus Sandgren	Tom Cross	CO3 Executive Producer	Finishing Colorist: Matt Wallach Dailies Colorist: Jack Tashdjian
The Pale Blue Eye	Scott Cooper	Masanobu Takayanagi	Dylan Tichenor	CO3 Executive Producer	Supervising Colorist: Tom Poole Finishing Colorist: Dustin Wadsworth
Living	Oliver Hermanus	Jamie D. Ramsay	Chris Wyatt	CO3 Executive Producer	Finishing Colorist: Joseph Bicknell Color Assistant: Jake White

=== 2023 ===
Title	Director(s)	Cinematographer(s)	Editor(s)	Roles	Other notes
Still: A Michael J. Fox Movie	Davis Guggenheim	C. Kim Miles (Scripted Photography), Julia Liu	Michael Harte	CO3 Executive Producer/Colorist	Additional Colorist: Adam Nazarenko Color Assistant: Aaron Bennett
Shotgun Wedding	Jason Moore	Peter Deming	Doc Crotzer	CO3 Executive Producer	Colorist: Tom Poole Additional Color: Jenny Montgomery
Ant-Man and the Wasp: Quantumania	Peyton Reed	William Pope	Adam Gerstel, Laura Jennings	CO3 Executive Producer	Creative Finishing Supervisor: Evan Jacobs Supervising Finishing Artist: Jill Bogdanowicz
Cocaine Bear	Elizabeth Banks	John Guleserian	Joel Negron	CO3 Executive Producer or CO3 President	Colorist: Natasha Leonnet Color Assistant: Kalvin Johnson
We Have a Ghost	Christopher Landon	Marc Spicer	Ben Baudhuin	CO3 Executive Producer	Finishing Colorist: Tom Reiser Dailies Colorist: Ryan Hamel
Boston Strangler	Matt Ruskin	Ben Kutchins	Anne McCabe	CO3 Executive Producer	Supervising Colorist: Stephen Nakamura Colorist: Dustin Wadsworth
Dungeons & Dragons: Honor Among Thieves	John Francis Daley, Jonathan Goldstein	Barry Peterson	Dan Lebental	CO3 Executive Producer/Colorist	Additional Colorist: Adam Nazarenko Image Scientist: John Quartel
Chupa	Jonás Cuarón	Nico Aguilar	Dan Zimmerman	CO3 Executive Producer	Finishing Colorist: Bryan Smaller Color Assistants: Melina Smith, Diego Orkiz
Chevalier	Stephen Williams	Jess Hall	John Axelrad	CO3 Executive Producer	Colorist: Yvan Lucas Image Scientist: Michael Kannard
Are You There God? It's Me, Margaret.	Kelly Fremon Craig	Tim Ives	Nick Moore, Oona Flaherty	CO3 Executive Producer	Supervising Colorist: Skip Kimball Image Scientist: Michael Kannard
Guardians of the Galaxy Vol. 3	James Gunn	Henry Braham	Fred Raskin, Greg D'Auria Second Film Editor: Tatiana S. Riegel	Supervising Finishing Artist/CO3 Executive Producer Finishing Artists: Adam Nazarenko, Parker Jarvie	Creative Finishing Supervisor: Evan Jacobs 3D Finishing Artists: Jared Pecht, Alan Louis Gordon
Book Club: The Next Chapter	Bill Holderman	Andrew Dunn	Doc Crotzer	CO3 Executive Producer	Finishing Colorist: Tim Stipan Additional Color: Andrew Geary
Fool's Paradise	Charlie Day	Nico Aguilar	Leslie Jones, Tim Roche Additional Editor: Erik L. Barnes	CO3 Executive Producer	Colorist: Bryan Smaller Color Assistants: Nicholas Gooden, Steven Thompson
Past Lives	Celine Song	Shabier Kirchner	Keith Fraase Additional Editor: Shannon Fitzpatrick	CO3 Executive Producer	Finishing Colorist: Tom Poole Color Assistants: Andrew Mirnamesh, Mena Smith
Shooting Stars	Chris Robinson	Karsten Gopinath	Jo Francis	CO3 Executive Producer	Colorist: Dave Hussey Color Assistants: Nick Nassif, Maley Boyl-Davis
Transformers: Rise of the Beasts	Steven Caple Jr.	Enrique Chediak	Joel Negron, William Goldenberg Additional Editors: Brett M. Reed, Stuart Levy, Calvin Wimmer	CO3 Executive Producer Colorist: Stephen Nakamura	Assistant Colorists: Nick Nassif, Aaron Bennett, Nicholas Gooden 3D Assistant Colorist & Convergence Artist: John Tripp
The Flash	Andy Muschietti	Henry Braham	Paul Machliss, Jason Ballantine	Digital Intermediate Colorist	Additional Colorist: Parker Jarvie Digital Intermediate Producers: Erik Rogers, Zach Watkins
Extraction 2	Sam Hargrave	Greg Baldi	Axel Rodríguez, William Hoy Additional Editors: Pietro Scalia, Matthew Carson	CO3 Executive Producer	Colorist: Stephen Nakamura Color Assistants: Steven Thompson, John Tripp
Maggie Moore(s)	John Slattery	W. Mott Hupfel III	Tom McArdle	Finishing Colorist/CO3 Executive Producer	Second Colorist: Andrew Geary Color Assistant: Diego Orkiz
Indiana Jones and the Dial of Destiny	James Mangold	Phedon Papamichael	Michael McCusker, Andrew Buckland, Dirk Westervelt VFX & Additional Editor: John Berri	CO3 Executive Producer Supervising Colorist: Skip Kimball	Dailies Colourist: James Slattery Additional Colourist: Brett Rayner
Wham!	Chris Smith		Gregor Lyon	Supervising Colourist	Colourist: James Slattery Colour Assistant: Shing Hong Chan
The Out-Laws	Tyler Spindel	Michael Bonvillain	Ian Kezsbom, Phillip Kimsey	CO3 Executive Producer/Colorist	Additional Colorist: Adam Nazarenko Dailies Colorist: Marc Lulkin
Insidious: The Red Door	Patrick Wilson	Autumn Eakin	Derek Ambrosi, Michel Aller	CO3 Executive Producer	Finishing Colorist: Sofie Borup Color Assistant: Emily Bailey
The Crusades	Leo Milano	Dillon Schneider	Brent McReynolds	Executive Producer	Colorist: Matt Wallach Image Scientist: Michael Kannard
Haunted Mansion	Justin Simien	Jeffrey Walden	Philip J. Bartell	CO3 Executive Producer	Colorist/Supervising Finishing Artist: Jill Bogdanowicz Color Assistants: Jared Pecht, John Tripp
Gran Turismo	Neill Blomkamp	Jacques Jouffret	Colby Parker Jr., Austyn Daines	Digital Intermediate Colorist	Additional Colorist: Parker Jarvie Finishing Producer: Dawn Landon
You Are So Not Invited to My Bat Mitzvah	Sammi Cohen	Ben Hardwicke	Jamie Kenney	CO3 Executive Producer	Digital Intermediate Colorist: Tyler Roth Color Assistant: John Tripp
The Equalizer 3	Antoine Fuqua	Robert Richardson	Conrad Buff IV	DI Colorist	Additional Colorist: Adam Nazarenko Colorist Assistants: Aaron Bennett, Frankie Hudson, Duncan Byrne
Superpower	Sean Penn, Aaron Kaufman	Aaron Kaufman	Carlos Haynes	Colorist	Additional Colorist: Andrew Geary
My Big Fat Greek Wedding 3	Nia Vardalos	Barry Peterson	Annette Davey, Craig Herring Additional Editor: Aaron Brock	Supervising Colorist	Colorist: Aurora Shannon Additional Colorist: Adam Nazarenko
No One Will Save You	Brian Duffield	Aaron Morton	Gabriel Fleming	CO3 Executive Producer	Colorist: Stephen Nakamura Color Assistant: John Tripp
Dumb Money	Craig Gillespie	Nikolas Karakatsanis	Kirk Baxter Additional Editor: Rex Lowry	CO3 Executive Producer	Finishing Colorist: Tom Poole Additional Color: Dustin Wadsworth
Desperation Road	Nadine Cracker	Sy Turnbull	Jing Han	CO3 Executive Producer	Supervising Colorist: Jill Bogdanowicz Additional Colorist: Jared Pecht
The Burial	Maggie Betts	Maryse Alberti	Lee Percy, Jay Cassidy	CO3 Executive Producer	Finishing Colorist: Tim Stipan Color Assistants: Diego Orkiz, Nick Daukas
Killers of the Flower Moon	Martin Scorsese	Rodrigo Prieto	Thelma Schoonmaker	Co3 Executive Producer	Finishing Colorist: Yvan Lucas Company 3 Additional Color: Alan Louis Gordon
Nyad	Jimmy Chin, Elizabeth Chai Vasarhelyi	Claudio Miranda	Christopher Tellefsen	CO3 Executive Producer	Digital Intermediate Supervising Colorist: Stephen Nakamura Digital Intermediate Colorist: Andrew Geary
If You Were the Last	Kristian Mercado	Alex Disenhof	Henry Hayes	CO3 Executive Producer	Supervising Finishing Colorist: Tom Poole Finishing Colorist: Dustin Wadsworth
Rustin	George C. Wolfe	Tobias Schliessler	Andrew Mondshein	CO3 Executive Producer/Colorist	Additional Colorist: Andrew Geary Dailies Colorist: Alex Kaufman
The Marvels	Nia DaCosta	Sean Bobbitt	Catrin Hedström, Evan Schiff	CO3 Executive Producer	Creative Finishing Supervisor: Evan Jacobs Supervising Finishing Artist: Tom Poole
Maestro	Bradley Cooper	Matthew Libatique	Michelle Tesoro	Colorist/CO3 Executive Producer	Additional Color: Dustin Wadsworth & Andrew Geary Lead Color Assist: Melina Smith
Family Switch	Joseph McGinty Nichol	Marc Spicer	Brian Scott Olds	CO3 Executive Producer	Supervising Digital Colorist: Tom Reiser Additional Digital Colorist: Jason Hanel
Poor Things	Yorgos Lanthimos	Robbie Ryan	Yorgos Mavropsaridis	CO3 Executive Producer	Colourist: Greg Fisher Lead Colour Assistant: Jonas Jangvad
Rebel Moon - Part One: A Child of Fire	Zack Snyder		Dody Dorn	CO3 Executive Producer/Colorist	Additional Colorist: Adam Nazarenko Color Assistant: Frankie Hudson
The Iron Claw	Sean Durkin	Mátyás Erdély	Matthew Hannam	CO3 Executive Producer	Finishing Colorist: Sofie Borup Color Assistant: Emily Bailey
The Color Purple	Blitz Bazawule	Dan Laustsen	Jon Poll	Digital Intermediate Colorist	Additional Colorist: Adam Nazarenko Dailies Colorist: Nicholas Winkelmann
Ferrari	Michael Mann	Erik Messerschmidt	Pietro Scalia Additional Editor: John M. Valerio	CO3 Executive Producer/Colorist	Additional Colorist: Adam Nazarenko
The Boys in the Boat	George Clooney	Martin Ruhe	Tanya M. Swerling	CO3 Executive Producer/Colorist	Additional Colorist: Parker Jarvie Color Assistants: Theresa Crooks, Shing Hong Chan

=== 2024 ===
Title	Director(s)	Cinematographer(s)	Editor(s)	Roles	Other notes
Lift	F. Gary Gray	Bernhard Jasper	William Yeh Additional Editor: Richard Pearson	CO3 Executive Producer	Colorist: Stephen Nakamura Additional Color: Adam Nazarenko
DEVO	Chris Smith		Joey Scoma	CO3 Executive Producer/Colorist	Additional Colorist: Adam Nazarenko Company 3 Producer: James Levine
Which Brings Me To You	Peter Hutchings	Karina Silva	Jason Nicholson	CO3 Executive Producer/Colorist	Additional Colorist: Andrew Geary Color Assist: Melina Smith
Bob Marley: One Love	Reinaldo Marcus Green	Robert Elswit	Pamela Martin	CO3 Executive Producer/Colourist Additional Colourist: James Slattery	Colour Assistants Jonas Jangvad, Shing Hong Chan, Theresa Crooks, Chris Poole Dailies Colourist: Doug Garside
Damsel	Juan Carlos Fresnadillo	Larry Fong	John Gilbert	CO3 Executive Producer	Colourist: Greg Fisher Colour Assistants: Jonas Jangvad Shing Hong Chan, Theresa Crooks
Arthur the King	Simon Cellan Jones	Jacques Jouffret	Gary D. Roach	CO3 Executive Producer/Colorist	Additional Colorists: Parker Jarvie, Dave Muscat Dailies Colorist: David Koval
Road House	Doug Liman	Henry Braham	Doc Crotzer	Digital Colorist	Additional Colorist: Andrew Geary Dailies Colorists: Gabriel McIntyre (NY), Tom Klane (LA)
Ghostbusters: Frozen Empire	Gil Kenan	Eric Steelberg	Nathan Orloff, Shane Reid	Digital Colorist	Additional Colorist: Adam Nazarenko Dailies Colourist: Doychin Margoevski
Rebel Moon – Part Two: The Scargiver	Zack Snyder		Dody Dorn	CO3 Executive Producer/Colorist	Additional Colorist: Adam Nazarenko Color Assistant: Frankie Hudson
The Fall Guy	David Leitch	Jonathan Sela	Elísabet Ronaldsdóttir	CO3 Executive Producer	Colorist: Dave Hussey Additional Color: Nick Nassif
IF	John Krasinski	Janusz Kamiński	Christopher Rouse, Andy Canny	CO3 Executive Producer/Colorist	Additional Colorists: Andrew Geary, Adam Nazarenko Dailies Colorist: John Vladic
Atlas	Brad Peyton	John Schwartzman	Bob Ducsay	CO3 Executive Producer/Colorist	Additional Colorist: Adam Nazarenko Dailies Colorist: Ben Estrada
Young Woman and the Sea	Joachim Rønning	Óscar Faura	Úna Ní Dhonghaíle	CO3 Executive Producer/Colourist	Additional Colourist: Yoomin Lee Colour Assistant: Theresa Crooks
Bad Boys: Ride or Die	Adil El Arbi and Bilall Fallah	Robrecht Heyvaert	Dan Lebental, Asaf Eisenberg	Colorist	Additional Colorists: Adam Nazarenko, Bryan Smaller, Siggy Ferstl Dailies Colorist: Karli Windischmann
The Bikeriders	Jeff Nichols	Adam Stone	Julie Monroe	CO3 Executive Producer Supervising Digital Colorist: Mitch Paulson	Color Assistant: Jason Maydick Dailies Colorist: Richard Flores
Daddio	Christy Hall	Phedon Papamichael	Lisa Zeno Churgin	CO3 Executive Producer	Colorist: Skip Kimball Image Scientist: Michael Kannard
Beverly Hills Cop: Axel F	Mark Molloy	Eduard Grau	Dan Lebental Additional Editor: Asaf Eisenberg	CO3 Executive Producer Supervising Colorist: Tom Poole	Colorist: Dustin Wadsworth Color Assistant: Frankie Hudson
Twisters	Lee Isaac Chung	Dan Mindel	Terilyn A. Shropshire	Colorist/Executive Producer	Additional Colorists: Adam Nazarenko, Parker Jarvie Color Assistant: Connor Burns
Deadpool & Wolverine	Shawn Levy	George Richmond	Dean Zimmerman, Shane Reid	CO3 Executive Producer Supervising Finishing Artist: Skip Kimball	Creative Finishing Supervisor: Evan Jacobs Finishing Artists: Greg Fisher, Adam Nazarenko, Alan Louis Gordon, Jared Pecht
It Ends with Us	Justin Baldoni	Barry Peterson	Oona Flaherty, Robb Sullivan Additional Editors: Alan Baumgarten, Shane Reid	Colorist Additional Colorists: Tyler Roth, Parker Jarvie	Assistant Colorist/Color Assist: Lauren Gower Dailies Colorist: Alex Kaufman
Jackpot!	Paul Feig	John Schwartzman	Brent White	Colourist	Additional Colourist: Yoomin Lee Dailies Colorist: Ben Estrada
Uglies	Joseph McGinty Nichol	Xiaolong Liu	Martin Bernfeld, Brad Besser	CO3 Executive Producer/Colorist Additional Colorist: Adam Nazarenko	Color Assist: Joshua Yip Dailies Colorists: Karli Windischmann, Gabriel McIntyre
Venom: The Last Dance	Kelly Marcel	Fabian Wagner	Mark Sanger	Digital Colorist	Additional Colorists: Adam Nazarenko, Joel McWilliams
Red One	Jake Kasdan	Dan Mindel	Steve Edwards, Mark Helfrich, Tara Timpone	Colorist / Executive Producer	Dailies Colorist: Nicholas Winkelmann Assistant Colorist: Adam Nazarenko
Wicked	Jon M. Chu	Alice Brooks	Myron Kerstein	CO3 Executive Producer or CO3 President Colorist: Jill Bogdanowicz	Additional Colorist: Jared Pecht Color Assistants: Lauren Gower, Steven Thompson

=== 2025 ===
Title	Director(s)	Cinematographer(s)	Editor(s)	Roles	Other notes
Captain America: Brave New World	Julius Onah	Kramer Morgenthau	Matthew Schmidt, Madeleine Gavin	CO3 Executive Producer Supervising Finishing Artist: Stephen Nakamura	Creative Finishing Supervisor: Evan Jacobs Finishing Artists: Adam Nazarenko, Nick Nassif
The Gorge	Scott Derrickson	Dan Laustsen	Frédéric Thoraval	CO3 Executive Producer/Colorist	Additional Color: Parker Jarvie Color Assistant: Joshua Yip
Kiss of the Spider Woman	Bill Condon	Tobias Schliessler	Brian A. Kates	Colorist Additional Colorist: Drew Geary	Color Assistant: Frankie Hudson Dailies Colorist: Alex Kaufman
We Are Storror	Michael Bay	Brett Lowell, Sacha Powell, Chris Thomson, Elliot White, Richard Ferreday	Michael Engelken, Jan Supa	CO3 Colorist/Executive Producer	Additional Colorist: Adam Nazarenko
Another Simple Favor	Paul Feig	John Schwartzman	Brent White	CO3 Colorist/Executive Producer	Additional Color: Adam Nazarenko Color Assistants: Lauren Gower, Ashton Thomas
Novocaine	Dan Berk, Robert Olsen	Jacques Jouffret	Christian Wagner	CO3 Colorist/Executive Producer	Additional Color: Parker Jarvie Assistant Colorist: Lauren Gower
Snow White	Marc Webb	Mandy Walker	Mark Sanger, Sarah Broshar	CO3 Executive Producer	Colourist: Yvan Lucas Colour Assistant: Christopher Jamieson-Green
The Alto Knights	Barry Levinson	Dante Spinotti	Douglas Crise	CO3 Colorist/Executive Producer	Additional Colorist: Parker Jarvie Dailies Colorist: Gabriel McIntyre
The Amateur	James Hawes	Martin Ruhe	Jonathan Amos	CO3 Executive Producer/Colourist	Additional Colour: James Slattery Colour Assistant: Lauren Gower
Thunderbolts*	Jake Schreier	Andrew Droz Palermo	Harry Yoon, Angela M. Catanzaro	CO3 Executive Producer Supervising Finishing Artist: Tom Poole	Creative Finishing Supervisor: Evan Jacobs Finishing Artist: Adam Nazarenko
F1	Joseph Kosinski	Claudio Miranda	Stephen Mirrione	CO3 Executive Producer/Colorist Additional Colorist: Parker Jarvie	Additional/Marketing Colorist: Adam Nazarenko Color Assistant: Lauren Gower
Superman	James Gunn	Henry Braham	Jason Ballantine, William Hoy	Digital Intermediate Colorist Additional Colorist: Parker Jarvie	3D Colorist: Jared Pecht Color Assistant: Lauren Gower
The Fantastic Four: First Steps	Matt Shakman	Jess Hall	Nona Khodai, Tim Roche Additional Editor: Terel Gibson	CO3 Executive Producer Supervising Finishing Artist: Tom Poole	Creative Finishing Supervisor: Evan Jacobs Finishing Artist: Adam Nazarenko
The Lost Bus	Paul Greengrass	Pål Ulvik Rokseth	William Goldenberg, Paul Rubell, Peter M. Dudgeon	CO3 Executive Producer Supervising Colorist: Stephen Nakamura	Colorist: James Slattery Additional Color: Nick Nassif
Tron: Ares	Joachim Rønning	Jeff Cronenweth	Tyler Nelson	CO3 Executive Producer/Colorist	Additional Colorist: Adam Nazarenko 3D Colorist: John Tripp
Love+War	Elizabeth Chai Vasarhelyi, Jimmy Chin	Thorston Thielow	Keiko Deguchi, Hypatia Porter	Supervising Colorist	Colorist: Jaime O'Bradovich
Frankenstein	Guillermo Del Toro	Dan Laustsen	Evan Schiff	CO3 Executive Producer/Colorist	Additional Colorist: Dave Muscat
Now You See Me: Now You Don't	Ruben Fleischer	George Richmond	Stacey Schroeder	CO3 Executive Producer/Colorist	Additional Colorist: Adam Nazarenko Color Assistant: Ashton Thomas
Ella McCay	James L. Brooks	Robert Elswit	Tracey Wadmore-Smith	CO3 Executive Producer/Colorist Additional Colorist: Adam Nazarenko	Color Assistants: Ben Cerauli, Jaden Reiter Image Scientist: Michael Kannard
The Housemaid	Paul Feig	John Schwartzman	Brent White	CO3 Executive Producer / Colorist Additional Colorist: Parker Jarvie	Color Assistant: Lauren Gower Dailies Colorist: Ben Estrada

=== 2026 ===
Title	Director(s)	Cinematographer(s)	Editor(s)	Roles	Other notes
Greenland 2: Migration	Ric Roman Waugh	Martin Ahlgren	Colby Parker Jr. Additional Editors: Gabriel Fleming, Joe Galdo, Eric Friedman	CO3 Executive Producer Colourist: Matt Osborne	Colour Assistants: Jonas Jangvad, Shing Hong Chan, Christopher Jamieson-Green, Emma Hockley Dailies Colourist: John Maltby
Shelter	Ric Roman Waugh	Martin Ahlgren	Matthew Newman	CO3 Executive Producer Colourist: Matt Osborne	Additional Colourists: Jake M. White, James Slattery Colour Assistants: Shing Hong Chan, Joss Hardman, Jonas Jangvad, Christopher Jamieson-Green, Emma Hockley
Michael	Antoine Fuqua	Dion Beebe	John Ottman, Harry Yoon	CO3 Executive Producer / Supervising Digital Colorist Additional Colorist: Adam Nazarenko	Color Assistants: Jaden Reiter, Steven Thompson Dailies Colorist: Ben Estrada
Obsession	Curry Barker	Taylor Scott Clemons	Curry Barker	CO3 Executive Producer	Colorist: Jake White Finishing Editor: Nicholas Figueroa
Jack Ryan: Ghost War	Andrew Bernstein	Arnau Valls Colomer	Jason Ballantine	Supervising Colorist Colorist: Yoomin Lee	Image Scientists: John Quartel, Amine Boukerrou
Scary Movie	Michael Tiddes	Terry Stacey	Jonathan Schwartz	Supervising Colorist Colorist: Yoomin Lee	Dailies Colorist: Karli Windischmann
Spider-Man: Brand New Day	Destin Daniel Cretton	Brett Pawlak	Nat Sanders, Gina Sansom, Harry Yoon	Executive Producer Supervising Finishing Artist: Tom Poole	Finishing Artist: Adam Nazarenko Finishing Supervisor: Evan Jacobs
Doing Life	Tyler Perry	Justyn Moro	Nick Coker	CO3 Executive Producer Colorist: Parker Jarvie	Additional Color: Justin White Color Assistants: Lauren Gower, Elijah Howard
The Social Reckoning	Aaron Sorkin	Jeff Cronenweth	Alan Baumgarten	Colorist Additional Colorist: Adam Nazarenko	Dailies Colorist: Jaan Spirka Image Scientist: Michael Kannard
Pan's Labyrinth	Guillermo Del Toro	Guillermo Navarro	Bernat Vilaplana	Supervising 3D Colorist 3D Colorist: Dave Muscat	Additional Colorists: Jared Pecht (3D), Adam Nazarenko Originally released in 2006. Converted to 3D by SDFX Studios for the 20th anniversary
Animals	Ben Affleck	Robert Elswit	William Goldenberg, Christopher Rouse	CO3 Executive Producer/Colorist Additional Colorists: Parker Jarvie, Nick Nassif	Image Scientist: Emily Faw Color Assistant: Jaden Reiter
Way of the Warrior Kid†	Joseph McGinty Nichol	Shane Hurlbut	Peter S. Elliot	CO3 Executive Producer/Colorist	Additional Colorist: Adam Nazarenko Dailies Colorist: Ben Estrada
Focker-in-Law†	John Hamburg	Barry Peterson	Brent White, Tom Eagles	Supervising Colorist Colorist: Yoomin Lee	Image Scientists: John Quartel, Amine Boukerrou
Jumanji: Open World†	Jake Kasdan	Ben Davis	Mark Helfrich, Steve Edwards	Colorist Additional Colorist: Adam Nazarenko	Image Scientist: Michael Kannard Dailies Colorist: Richard Flores Jr.

=== Special Thanks ===
Year	Title	Director(s)	Cinematographer(s)	Editor(s)	Colorist	Other notes
2008	Hannah Montana & Miley Cyrus: Best of Both Worlds Concert	Bruce Hendricks	Mitchell Amundsen	Michael Tronick	John Daro	DI Supervisor: John Nicolard 3D Digital Intermediate by FotoKem Digital Film Services
2025	Good Luck, Have Fun, Don't Die	Gore Verbinski	James Whitaker	Craig Wood	Stephen Nakamura	Additional Colorist: Nick Nassif Color completed at Company 3

Key
†	Denotes projects that have not yet been released

=== Short films ===
Year	Title	Director(s)	Cinematographer(s)	Editor(s)	Roles	Other notes
2004	Portrait	Jordan Scott	Martin Ahlgren	Jonathan Del Gatto	Colorist	Amazon Theater Series Producer: Missy Papageorge
2004	Agent Orange	Tony Scott	Stephen St. John	Skip Chaisson	Colorist	Amazon Theater Series Producer: Missy Papageorge
2004	Tooth Fairy	Jake Scott	Dan Mindel	Charlie Johnston	Colorist	Amazon Theater Series Producer: Missy Papageorge
2019	Battle at Big Rock	Colin Trevorrow	Larry Fong	Stephen M. Rickert Jr.	CO3 Executive Producer/Colourist	Additional Colorist: Paul Ensby Color Assistants: Chris Francis, Jonas Jangvad, Shing Hong Chan
2023	The Calm	Sam Hargrave	Jeff Cronenweth	TBA	Colorist	Company 3 Producer: Blake Rice
2025	Brighter Days Ahead	Christian Breslauer, Ariana Grande	Jeff Cronenweth	Luis Caraza Peimbert	Colorist	Company 3 Producer: Wesley Lewis

=== Television ===
Year	Title	Showrunner	Director(s)	Cinematographer(s)	Editor(s)	Roles	Other notes
2005	Prison Break	Paul Scheuring	Brett Ratner	Dante Spinotti	Mark Helfrich	Colorist	Episode: "Pilot" Final Colorist: Tony Smith
2005	CSI: NY	Anthony E. Zuiker, Ann Donahue & Carol Mendelsohn	David Von Ancken, Scott Lautanen & Norberto Barba	Feliks Parnell & Marshall Adams	Bill Zabala, Barry B. Leirer & Erik Presant	Supervising Colorist	Episodes: "Summer in the City", "Grand Murder at Central Station" & "Zoo York" Final Colorist: Johnny Kirkwood
2006	Close to Home	Jim Leonard	Kevin Dowling, Matt Earl Beesley, John Peters, Lewis H. Gould, Charles Beeson, Janice Cooke Leonard, Jeffrey G. Hunt, Mike Rohl, Anthony Hemingway, Joseph Berger Davis, Dermott Downs, Steve Boyum, Tawnia McKiernan & Christopher Leitch	Marvin V. Rush	Tracy Curtis & David Post	Colorist	Season 2 Final Colorist: Ken Van Deest
2006	Without a Trace	Hank Steinberg	Randy Zisk, Jonathan Kaplan, Jeannot Szwarc, Kate Woods, Jonathan Peters, Peter Markle, Martha Mitchell, Bobby Roth, Scott White, John F. Showalter, Eriq La Salle, Paul McCrane, Rosemary Rodriguez, Eric Close & John Polson	Christopher Faloona	Lynne Willingham	Colorist	Season 5 Final Colorist: George Delaney
2007	Without a Trace	Hank Steinberg	John Polson, Chris Long, Greg Walker, Scott White, Kate Woods, Jonathan Kaplan, Martha Mitchell, Jeannot Szwarc, Jeff T. Thomas & Bobby Roth	Christopher Faloona	Fred Peterson	Colorist	Season 6 Final Colorist: George Delaney
2016	The Night Of	Richard Price & Steven Zaillian	Steven Zaillian & James Marsh	Robert Elswit (Pilot Only), Frederick Elmes & Igor Martinović	Jay Cassidy (Pilot Only) & Nick Houy	Supervising Colorist	Colorist: Rob Sciarratta
2017	Star Trek: Discovery	Bryan Fuller, Alex Kurtzman	David Semel, Adam Kane, Akiva Goldsman	Guillermo Navarro, Colin Hoult, Darren Tiernan	Jon Dudkowski, Scott Gamzon	Company 3 Final Colorist	Episodes : The Vulcan Hello, Battle at the Binary Stars, Context Is for Kings Assistant Colorist: James Cody Baker
2018	Jack Ryan	Carlton Cuse, Graham Roland	Morten Tyldum, Daniel Sackheim, Patricia Riggen, Carlton Cuse	Richard Rutkowski, Checco Varese, Chris Faloona	John Valerio, Paul Trejo, Sarah Boyd, Vikash Patel	Colorist	
2019	Jack Ryan	Carlton Cuse, Graham Roland	Phil Abraham, Andrew Bernstein & Dennie Gordon	TBA	TBA	Supervising Colorist	Season 2 Colorist: J. Cody Baker
2020	Star Trek: Picard	Michael Chabon	Hanelle M. Culpepper, Jonathan Frakes, Maja Vrvilo, Doug Aarniokoski, Akiva Goldsman	TBA	Philip Lanyon, Darran Tiernan	Final Colorist	Additional Color: J. Cody Baker
2021	The White Lotus	Mike White		Ben Kutchins	Heather Persons & John M. Valerio	Colorist	Additional Colorist: Parker Jarvie
2022	Peacemaker	James Gunn	James Gunn, Jody Hill, Rosemary Rodriguez & Brad Anderson	Michael Bonvillain, Sam McCurdy & Michael Wale	Fred Raskin, Todd Busch, Greg D'Auria & Gregg Featherman	Colorist	Season 1 Additional Colorist: Adam Nazarenko
2022	Star Trek: Picard Season 2	Akiva Goldsman, Terry Matalas	Doug Aarniokoski, Lea Thompson, Jonathan Frakes, Joe Menendez, Michael Weaver	Crescenzo Notarile, Jimmy Lindsey	TBA	Supervising Colorist	Colorist: J. Cody Baker
2022	Tokyo Vice	J. T. Rogers	Michael Mann	John Grillo	Tad Dennis, Mako Kamitsuna, David Rosenbloom, John M. Valerio	Colorist	Episode: "The Test" Company 3 Producer: Giovanni DiGiorgio
2022	Star Trek: Strange New Worlds	Akiva Goldsman, Alex Kurtzman, Jenny Lumet	Akiva Goldsman, Maja Vrvilo, Leslie Hope, Dan Liu, Rachel Leiterman, Andi Armaganian, Sydney Freeland, Amanda Row, Christopher J. Byrne, Chris Fisher	Glen Keenan, Magdalena Górka	Andrew Coutts, Dana Gasparine	Supervising Colorist	Colorist: J. Cody Baker VFX Consulting Supervisor: Mahmoud Rahnama
2022	The Terminal List	David DiGilio	Antoine Fuqua, Ellen Kuras, M. J. Bassett, Frederick E. O. Toye, Tucker Gates & Sylvain White	Armando Salas & Evans Brown	TBA	Supervising Colorist	Additional Colorist: Tyler Roth
2022	Legacy: The True Story of the LA Lakers	TBA	Antoine Fuqua	Maz Makhani	Jake Pushinsky, Brian Johnson, Michelle Witten, Brad Grossman	Colorist	Additional Colorist: Dave Muscat
2022	From Scratch	Attica Locke & Tembi Locke	Nzingha Stewart & Dennie Gordon	Brian Pearson & Patrick Murguia	Jim Flynn, Shannon Baker Davis, Jordan Goldman & Tana Plaengprawat	Colorist	Additional Colorist: Matt Osborne Company 3 Producer: Jessica Clarke
2022	The White Lotus: Season 2	Mike White		Xavier Pérez Grobet	Heather Persons & John M. Valerio	Colorist	
2022	Jack Ryan: Season 3	Vaun Wilmott	Kevin Dowling & David Petrarca	Richard Rutkowski, Jeffrey Greeley & Jacques Jouffret	Tad Dennis, Iain Erskine & Zachary Dehm	Supervising Colorist	Colorist: J. Cody Baker
2023	Star Trek: Picard Season 3	Terry Matalas	Jonathan Frakes, Doug Aarniokoski	Crescenzo Notarile, Jon Joffin	Eric Litman	Supervising Colorist	Colorist: J. Cody Baker Sr. Online Editor: Heydar Adel
2023	Daisy Jones & The Six	Scott Neustadter & Michael H. Weber	James Ponsoldt	Checco Varese	Tyler Cook, Garret Price, Amelia Allwarden & Michael Scott Jr	Colorist	Additional Colorist: Tyler Roth Dailies Colorist: John St. Laurent, Daniele Colombera, Ryan Hamel
2023	Extrapolations	Scott Z. Burns		Matthew Jensen, Zachary Galler, Eigil Bryld	Greg Bryant, Tim Streeto, Stephen Perez	Colorist	Additional Colorist: Andrew Geary Dailies Colorist: Dustin Wadsworth
2023	The Crowded Room	Akiva Goldsman	Mona Fastvold, Kornél Mundruczó	William Rexer, Tim Norman, Ksenia Sereda	Christopher Rand, Kevin Birou, Dávid Janscó, Vanessa Procopio	Colorist (with Andrew Geary)	Color Assistant: Andrew Mirmanesh Head of Production: Krystle Annand
2023	Star Trek: Strange New Worlds Season 2	Akiva Goldsman, Alex Kurtzman, Jenny Lumet	Chris Fisher, Valerie Weiss, Jordan Canning, Dan Liu, Jonathan Frakes, Jeff Byrd, Dermott Downs, Maja Vrvilo, Eduardo Sanchez	Glen Keenan, Benji Bakshi, Ian Anderson	Andrew Coutts, Dana Gasparine, Wes Whitton	Supervising Colorist	Colorist: J. Cody Baker
2023	100 Foot Wave	Chris Smith		Chris Smith, Antoine Chicoye, Mikey Corker, Michael Darrigade, Vincent Kardasik, Alexandre Lesbats, Laurent Pujol	Alex Bayer, Alex Keipper, Quin O'Brien, Alexis Johnson, Connor Culhane	Supervising Colorist Colorist: Parker Jarvie	Finishing Editor: Gus Comegys Company 3 Producer: Jessica Clarke
2023	All the Light We Cannot See	Steven Knight	Shawn Levy	Tobias Schliessler	Dean Zimmerman, Jonathan Corn, Casey Cichocki	CO3 Executive Producer	Supervising Colorist: Skip Kimball Image Scientist: Michael Kannard
2024	Under the Bridge	Quinn Shephard	Geeta Patel, Kevin Phillips, Catherine Hardwicke, Nimisha Mukerji, Quinn Shephard, Dinh Thai	Checco Varese, C. Kim Miles, Minka Farthing-Kohl	Justin Li, Tyler L. Cook, Sabrina Pitre, Kye Meechan, Kyle Reiter	Supervising Colorist	Colorist: Aurora Shannon Additional Colorist: Parker Jarvie
2024	Them: The Scare	Little Marvin	Little Marvin, Craig MacNeill, Axelle Carolyn, Guillermo Navarro, Ti West	Brendan Uegema, Evans Brown	Ken Blackwell, David Kashevaroff, Andrew Parkhurst	Colorist	Additional Colorist: Parker Jarvie
2024	Dune: Prophecy	Diane Ademu-John	Anna Foerster, John Cameron, Richard Lewis	Pierre Gill, Nikolaus Summerer, Paul Flinckenberg, Richard Donnelly	Sarah C. Reeves, Anna Hauger, Mark Hartzell, Amelia Allwarden	Colorist	Additional Colorist: Adam Nazarenko

=== 2025-2026 ===
Title	Showrunner(s)	Director(s)	Cinematographer(s)	Editor(s)	Roles	Other notes
American Primeval	Mark L. Smith	Peter Berg	Jacques Jouffret	Hugo Diaz, Jon Otazua, Art Jones Additional Editing: Jeffrey M. Werner, Rafa Garcia	Supervising Colorist	Colorist: Parker Jarvie Finishing Assists: Clayton Hunt, Seamus Finnegan
Pulse	Zoe Robyn, Carlton Cuse	Kate Dennis, Sarah Boyd, S. J. Main Muñoz, Wendey Stanzler, Carlton Cuse	Marc Laliberte, Ramsey Nickell	Luyen Vu, Colin Rich	Supervising Colorist	Colorist: Joanna Rourke Additional Colorist: Ian Passy
Government Cheese	Paul Hunter, Aeysha Carr	Øystein Karlsen	Matthew J. Lloyd	Joel Pashby	Colorist	Additional Colorist: Sean Coleman
Star Trek : Strange New Worlds Season 3	Akiva Goldsman, Henry Alonso Myers	Chris Fisher, Jordan Canning, Dan Liu, Jonathan Frakes, Andi Armaganian, Valerie Weiss, Sharon Lewis, Andrew Coutts, Maja Vrvilo	Benji Bakshi, Ian Anderson, Glen Keenan, Maja Vrvilo	Andrew Coutts, Dana Gasparine, Wes Whitton, Preston Rapp	Supervising Colorist	Colorist: Cody Baker
The Last Frontier	Jon Bokenkamp, Richard D'Ovidio	Sam Hargrave, John Curran, Jessica Lowery, Dennie Gordon	Giorgio Scali, Bernard Couture, Michael Caracciolo, Patrick Murguia	Chris Brookshire, Orlando Machado Jr., David Post, Amy Fleming	Supervising Colorist	Colorist: Adam Nazarenko
Lanterns	Chris Mundy, Damon Lindelof, Tom King	James Hawes, Stephen Williams, Geeta Vasant Patel, Alik Sakharov	Armando Salas, Florian Hoffmeister	Emily Greene	Supervising Colorist	Colorist: J. Cody Baker

Key
†	Denotes projects that have not yet been released

=== Music videos ===
Year	Title	Artist(s)	Director(s)	Cinematographer(s)	Editor(s)	Roles	Other notes
1995	California Love	Tupac, Dr. Dre, Roger Troutman	Hype Williams	John Perez	TBA	Senior Colorist	
1997	If God Will Send His Angels	U2	Phil Joanou	Marc Reshovsky	Phil Joanou	Senior Colorist	Filmed with Panavision Panaflex Platinum cameras and E-Series anamorphic lenses. Shot on 35 mm film
1999	Wild Wild West	Will Smith	Paul Hunter	Thomas Kloss	Harvey White	Senior Colorist	Shot on Kodak Vision 500T 5279 35 mm film with Cooke S4 Lenses
2001	You Rock My World	Michael Jackson	Paul Hunter	Jeff Cronenweth	Harvey White	Senior Colorist	
2016	Sandcastles	Beyoncé	Mark Romanek	Reed Morano	TBA	Senior Colorist	
2016	Can't Stop the Feeling!	Justin Timberlake	Mark Romanek	Jody Lee Lipes	TBA	Senior Colorist	
2016	Don't Wanna Know	TBA	David Dobkin	John Perez	TBA	Senior Colorist	
2017	Torches	TBA	Robby Starbuck	Matthew T. Rodgers	Robby Starbuck	Senior Colorist	
2018	Filthy	TBA	Mark Romanek	Adam Richards	Damion Clayton	Senior Colorist	Visual Effects Supervisor: Jesse Bradstreet Visual Effects by Method Studios
2018	Supplies	Justin Timberlake	Dave Meyers	Scott Cunningham	Nick Gilberg	Senior Colorist	Visual Effects by Rodeo FX Shot on Red Helium cameras with Cooke Optics Anamorphic/i and Hawk C-Series Lenses
2018	All the Stars	Kendrick Lamar	Dave Meyers, Kendrick Lamar, Dave Free	Starr Whitesides	Greg Scruton	Senior Colorist	Lamar & Free are credited as The Little Homies
2018	No Tears Left to Cry	Ariana Grande	Scott Cunningham	Nick Gilberg	Shot on Red Weapon Helium cameras with Cooke S4 Lenses	Senior Colorist	
2018	Win	Jay Rock	Scott Cunningham	Dave Meyers, Dave Free	Greg Scruton	Senior Colorist	Shot on Red Helium and Phantom Flex4K cameras with Arri Ultra Prime Lenses
2018	God Is a Woman	Ariana Grande	Scott Cunningham	Dave Meyers	TBA	Senior Colorist	
2018	Stop Trying to Be God	TBA	Scott Cunningham	Dave Meyers	TBA	Senior Colorist	
2018	Made For Now	TBA	Scott Cunningham	Dave Meyers	Nick Gilberg	Senior Colorist	
2018	Consequences	TBA	Scott Cunningham	Dave Meyers	Nick Gilberg	Senior Colorist	Visual Effects by Method Studios
2018	Sicko Mode	TBA	Scott Cunningham	Dave Meyers	Greg Scruton	Senior Colorist	
2018	Zero	Imagine Dragons	Scott Cunningham	Dave Meyers	Nick Gilberg	Senior Colorist	
2019	Girl	Maren Morris	Scott Cunningham	Dave Meyers	Biff Butler	Senior Colorist	Visual Effects by Ingenuity Studios
2019	Bad Guy	Billie Eilish	Scott Cunningham	TBA		Senior Colorist	
2019	Me!	Taylor Swift	Scott Cunningham	TBA	Dave Meyers, Taylor Swift	Senior Colorist	Visual Effects Supervisors: Loris Paillier & Lucas Salton
2019	Swan Song	Dua Lipa	Floria Sigismondi	Philippe Le Sourd	Clark Eddy	Senior Colorist	
2019	A Lot	TBA	Aisultan Seitov	Xiaolong Liu	TBA	Senior Colorist	
2019	Señorita	Shawn Mendes, Camila Cabello	Dave Meyers	Scott Cunningham	Alyssa Oh	Senior Colorist	
2019	Antisocial	Ed Sheeran, Travis Scott	Dave Meyers	Scott Cunningham	Alyssa Oh	Senior Colorist	Visual Effects by Mathematic
2019	Highest in the Room	TBA	Dave Meyers	Scott Cunningham	Alyssa Oh	Senior Colorist	Post Production Services by Ingenuity Studios
2019	Adore You	Harry Styles	Dave Meyers	Scott Cunningham	Alyssa Oh	Senior Colorist	Visual Effects by Mathematic
2020	My Oh My	Camila Cabello	Dave Meyers	Scott Cunningham	Alyssa Oh	Senior Colorist	Visual Effects by Ingenuity Studios
2020	Falling	Harry Styles	Dave Meyers	Scott Cunningham	Greg Scruton	Senior Colorist	Visual Effects by Mathematic
2020	How to Be Lonely	TBA	Dave Meyers	Patrick Murguia	Alyssa Oh	Senior Colorist	Visual Effects by Mathematic
2020	Lockdown	TBA	Dave Meyers	Scott Cunningham	Alyssa Oh	Senior Colorist	
2020	Laugh Now Cry Later	TBA	Dave Meyers	Scott Cunningham	TBA	Senior Colorist	
2020	Positions	TBA	Dave Meyers	Scott Cunningham	Alyssa Oh	Senior Colorist	
2022	Unholy	Sam Smith, Kim Petras	Floria Sigismondi	Joel Honeywell	Jarrett Fijal	Senior Colorist	Additional Colorist: Parker Jarvie Senior Producer, Color: Blake Rice
2023	Spin Bout U	Drake, 21 Savage	Dave Meyers	Scott Cunningham	Nathan Rodgers	Senior Colorist	Shot on Sony CineAlta Venice 2 cameras with Cooke S7 lenses
2023	Middle Ground	Maroon 5	David Dobkin	Giles Dunning	Bill Yukich	Senior Colorist	Producer: Blake Rice
2024	I Know?	Travis Scott	Dave Meyers	Scott Cunningham	Greg Scruton Additional Editor: Sabra Stratton	Senior Colorist	Producer: Blake Rice Shot on Arricam LT 3-perf with Zeiss Super Speed lenses on Kodak Vision3 250D 5207 & 500T 5219 film
2024	Ruin	Usher, Pheelz	Dave Meyers	Scott Cunningham	Carlos Font Clos	Senior Colorist	Producer: Blake Rice

=== Commercials ===
Year	Title	Director(s)	Cinematographer(s)	Editor(s)	Roles	Other notes
1999	Sleeping Beauty Barbie	Peter Nydrle	TBA		Colorist	
1999	Totally YoYo Skipper Barbie	Peter Nydrle	TBA		Colorist	
1999	Gatorade: Challenge feat. Michael Jordan	Samuel Bayer		TBA	Colorist	
2001	Ford Explorer: Geyser	Robert Logevall	Tobias Schliessler	TBA	Colorist	Filmed with Arriflex 435 cameras and Cooke Lenses. Shot on 35 mm Kodak Vision 250D 5246
2022	Gatorade: All For Fun	Dave Meyers	Scott Cunningham	Nathan M. Rodgers	Colorist	Sound Design/Mix by Beacon Street Studios
2022	GMC Hummer EV: Reporting for Call of Duty	Joseph Kosinski	Hoyte van Hoytema	James Haygood	Colorist	CO3 Producer: Blake Rice Visual effects by Method Studios
2022	Frito Lay: Is It Called Soccer or Football?	Michael Bay	Dion Beebe	TBA	Senior Colorist	Company 3 Color Producer: Blake Rice Finishing Producer: Alexandra Hooker
2023	DJ Khaled: Commit to Nothing	Dave Meyers	Scott Cunningham	Amanda James	Colorist	Visual Effects by Mathematic TV Company 3 Producer: Blake Rice
2023	NFL: Run For It	Bryan Buckley	Hoyte van Hoytema	Lauren Dellara Assistant Editor: Jack Kanner	Colorist	Visual Effects by Parliament FX Company 3 Producer: Blake Rice
2023	Pringles: Best of Us	Tom Kuntz	Hoyte van Hoytema	Carlos Arias	Colorist	Company 3 Producer: Blake Rice
2023	Tubi: Rabbit Hole	Tom Kuntz	Julia Swain, Rodrigo Prieto	TBA	Colorist	Company 3 Producer: Blake Rice
2023	Capital One: March Madness	Spike Lee	Matthew Libatique	Mike Leuis	Colorist	Company 3 Producer: Blake Rice Visual Effects by Framestore
2023	NFL Kickoff 2023: The Table Read	Aaron Stoller	Christian Sprenger	Graham Turner	Colorist	Company 3 Producer: Blake Rice
2023	Mortal Kombat: It's In Our Blood ft. Dave Bautista	Tom Kuntz	Matthew Libatique	Daniel Algarin	Colorist	Company 3 Producer: Blake Rice
2024	NFL: Born to Play	Andrew Dosunmo	Malik Hassan Sayeed	Biff Butler	Senior Colorist	Senior Producer: Blake Rice Visual Effects by Method Studios
2024	Coca-Cola Spiced: Nah It's...	Tom Kuntz	Matthew Libatique	Gavin Cutler	Colourist	Senior Producer, Colour: Blake Rice Visual Effects by Noise Studio
2024	Target: Big Morning	Tom Kuntz	Hoyte van Hoytema	Kirk Baxter	Colorist	Senior Producer: Blake Rice Ad for Target Circle Week
2024	Gin & Juice by Dre and Snoop	Dave Meyers	Scott Cunningham	Greg Scruton	Colorist	Color Producer: Wesley Lewis
2025	NFL: Flag 50	Peter Berg	Ava Berkovsky	Biff Butler	Colorist	Color Producer: Wesley Lewis
2025	Dunkin' Donuts: Java Jam	Ben Affleck	Robert Elswit	Brett M. Reed, Sarah Jordan	Colorist	Creative Director/Senior Finishing Lead: Wensen Ho Color Producer: Wesley Lewis
