= HPA Award for Outstanding Color Grading – Feature Film =

Annual award given by the Hollywood Professional Association

The Hollywood Professional Association Award for Outstanding Color Grading in a Feature Film is an annual award, given by the Hollywood Professional Association, or HPA, to post production workers in the film and television industry, in this case color graders. It was first awarded in 2006, and has been presented every year since. From 2006 to 2011, the category was titled HPA Award for Outstanding Color Grading Feature Film in a DI Process. The "DI" in the title refers to a digital intermediate (DI), a motion picture finishing process which a motion picture is digitized and the color and other image characteristics manipulated. As the filmmaking has evolved more into a digital forum, the added "DI Process" of the title became, essentially, antiquated.

== Winners and nominees ==
=== 2000s ===
Outstanding Color Grading Feature Film in a DI Process

Year	Film	Nominees
2006
2006	The Illusionist	Steven J. Scott
2006	King Kong	David Cole
2006	Stay	Mike Sowa
2007
2007	300	Stefan Sonnenfeld
2007	Children of Men	Steven J. Scott
2007	Hairspray	Steven J. Scott
2008
2008	Iron Man	Steven J. Scott
2008	Sweeney Todd: The Demon Barber of Fleet Street	Stefan Sonnenfeld
2008	The Kite Runner	Mike Sowa
2009
2009	Julie & Julia	Steven J. Scott
2009	Defiance	Natasha Leonnet
2009	Pride and Glory	David Cole

=== 2010s ===
Year	Film	Nominees
2010
2010	Alice in Wonderland	Stefan Sonnenfeld
2010	Avatar	Skip Kimball
2010	The Book of Eli	Maxine Gervais
2010	Get Low	Natasha Leonnet
2010	Percy Jackson & the Olympians: The Lightning Thief	Steven J. Scott
2011
2011	The Help	Steven J. Scott
2011	Love & Other Drugs	Natasha Leonnet
2011	Sucker Punch	Stefan Sonnenfeld
2011	Transformers: Dark of the Moon	Stefan Sonnenfeld
2011	Tron: Legacy	David Cole

Outstanding Color Grading - Feature Film

Year	Film	Nominees
2012
2012	The Iron Lady	Rob Pizzey
2012	The Best Exotic Marigold Hotel	Adam Glasman
2012	Drive	Tom Poole
2012	Once Upon a Time in Anatolia	James Norman
2012	Prometheus	Stephen Nakamura
2013
2013	Life of Pi	David Cole
2013	Anna Karenina	Adam Glasman
2013	Iron Man 3	Steven J. Scott
2013	Man of Steel	Stefan Sonnenfeld
2013	Oblivion	Mike Sowa
2013	Pacific Rim	Maxine Gervais
2013	Star Trek Into Darkness	Stefan Sonnenfeld
2014
2014	Gravity	Steven J. Scott
2014	12 Years a Slave	Tom Poole
2014	The Grand Budapest Hotel	Jill Bogdanowicz
2014	Labor Day	Natasha Leonnet
2014	The Monuments Men	Skip Kimball
2015
2015	Birdman or (The Unexpected Virtue of Ignorance)	Steven J. Scott
2015	The Boxtrolls	John Daro
2015	Lady of Csejte	Keith Roush
2015	Monsoon	Charles Boileau
2015	Whiplash	Natasha Leonnet
2016
2016	The Revenant	Steven J. Scott
2016	Brooklyn	Asa Shoul
2016	Carol	John Dowdell
2016	The Jungle Book	Steven J. Scott
2016	The Martian	Stephen Nakamura
2017
2017	Ghost in the Shell	Michael Hatzer
2017	Beauty and the Beast	Stefan Sonnenfeld
2017	Birth of a Nation	Steven J. Scott
2017	Doctor Strange	Steven J. Scott
2017	Fences	Michael Hatzer
2017	Hidden Figures	Natasha Leonnet
2018
2018	Alpha	Maxine Gervais
2018	Avengers: Infinity War	Steven J. Scott and Charles Bunnag
2018	The Greatest Showman	Tim Stipan
2018	Red Sparrow	Dave Hussey
2018	The Shape of Water	Chris Wallace
2019
2019	Spider-Man: Into the Spider-Verse	Natasha Leonnet
2019	First Man	Natasha Leonnet
2019	Green Book	Walter Volpatto
2019	The Nutcracker and the Four Realms	Tom Poole
2019	Roma	Steven J. Scott
2019	Us	Michael Hatzer
