= EFILM =

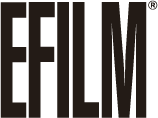
- Industry: Post production
- Founded: 1989
- Headquarters: Hollywood, CA
- Number of locations: Hollywood, CA
- Services: Digital intermediate
- Parent: Deluxe Entertainment Services Group Inc.
- Website: www.efilm.com

EFILM Digital Laboratories, founded in 1989 by Joe Matza(see Joe Matza), was a company serving the motion picture and television industry. Their clients include film studios, independent filmmakers, advertisers, animators, visual effects companies, and large-format filmmakers. EFILM is part of Deluxe Entertainment Services Group, a group of facilities that includes Beast, Company 3, Method Studios, and Rushes.

== Services ==
- Cinemascan
- Colorstream
- eVue
- Digital intermediate
- Digital lab services
- Image processing
- Laser film recording
- Location services
- Security & vaulting
- Tape to film transfers
- 16MM and 35MM scanning

== History ==
- 1989-1990 - Founded Joe Matza (director and creator of Magicam, CIS, and Las Palmas Productions, Inc.)develops a proprietary tape to film transfer process that creates high quality film recordings.
- 1993 - EFILM offers its film recording services to commercial, music video and movie trailer producers.
- 1994 - EFILM adds high resolution scanning to its list of services.
- 1995 - The company creates the world's first 2K digital intermediate color timing sequences for Batman Forever. The images are scanned, color timed and film recorded on the company's custom systems. The digital color timing system worked in real time via proxy images and allowed for interactive primary and secondary color corrections. The color settings were later applied to the 2K images. 25 minutes of special effects sequences were color timed this way under the creative direction of the film's visual effects designer, John Dykstra. This custom built system predated most, if not all, other high resolution color timing systems.

EFILM adds 65 mm film recording as a service for theatrical clients, theme parks, museums and other special venues. EFILM completed several 65 mm film recording projects including T2-3D: Battle Across Time, which open at Universal Florida in the summer of 1996.

- 1996 - The company develops digital laboratory software that is used throughout EFILM for almost every step of the workflow including scanning, tape to film, film recording and video and digital cinema deliverables. Their Etron software performs all the image processing needs for most jobs.
- 1997 - EFILM introduces its EWorks digital color correction software designed with a proprietary viewing approach that allowed the timer to accurately match photographed and digital images at any resolution.

EFILM's laser recording system successfully records its first VFX scenes for the feature film Dante's Peak. EFILM is also delivered 22 minutes of scanning and recording for the 1997 Academy Award Best Picture winner Titanic. Additionally, EFILM is selected to film record Contact, The Devil's Advocate, Mouse Hunt, Con Air, Spawn, Alien Resurrection, and Austin Powers: International Man of Mystery.

- 1998-1999 - EFILM expands its tape to film services. Refined format and color space translations provide a better workflow from standard definition tape to film gave EFILM the opportunity to participate in longer format productions. EFILM's first long format tape to film project is HBO's From the Earth to the Moon.
- 2000 - EFILM works with Panavision to transform digitally originated HDTV 24 frame progressive scan images to film.

EFILM is first to transform digitally originated HDTV 24 frame footage to 15 perforation 65 MM. The results are displayed for the Large Format Cinema Association conference in Los Angeles at the California Science Center and at the Universal City Walk IMAX theaters. EFILM goes on to experiment further with large format film makers and completed the first ever 3D stereo HD to 65 mm short film.

- 2001 - Panavision Inc. acquires LPPI (EFILM), as a digital laboratory that services the feature film, television, and commercial arenas.
- 2002 - EFILM signs an exclusive software agreement with Colorfront Software, Ltd., of Hungary, to develop proprietary software for EFILM's digital intermediate color timing process.

EFILM begins development to improve the accuracy of digital projection systems, specifically the refinement of the digital display matrix to better emulate film.

We Were Soldiers is the world's first full length motion picture created as a true 2K digital intermediate. The film is digitally mastered from fade up to fade out with :EFILM's proprietary technology including a number of industry firsts.
The first feature film to be 100% digitally mastered at true 2K resolution.
The first feature film to be 100% digitally colored timed on a computer.
The first feature film with release prints that required NO lab timing.
The first feature film with close to 2000 first generation release prints.
The first feature film with all the video masters derived from the 2K digital files.

EFILM is the first digital intermediate facility to incorporate storage area network (SAN) technology for creating digital intermediates.

Deluxe Laboratories became a 20% owner of EFILM.

EFILM expands its facilities by 8,000 square feet and added multiple digital color timing suites. This positions EFILM to become the leader in digital intermediates with the largest dedicated digital laboratory in the industry.

- 2003 - EFILM and Panavision develop proprietary optics for the digital projection systems EFILM uses in its digital intermediate process. The optical modifications are put on-line in June 2003.

EFILM performs the world's first location-based Digital Color Timing for a theatrically released film, Universal's Bruce Almighty. The work is done under the direction of Dean Semler, ASC in Austin, Texas while Dean is shooting The Alamo. The system includes EFILM's computer based color timing system, proprietary digital projection and our colorist. The session lasts two days with Semler giving specific direction and previewing the results on location via a digital projector. EFILM then returns to its home in Hollywood with the meta data created on location to complete the film.

- 2004 - Universal's Van Helsing is digitally assembled at 2K and EFILM creates digital cinema preview screening versions directly from the 2K files, which is an industry first. All previous digital previews came from the HD process. The EFILM approach ensures all the work that goes into the preview screenings ends up in the final movie.

EFILM scans the live action film, digitally assembles the cut, color times the entire film and renders and film records Spider-Man 2 at 4K. Other industry firsts include nine digital negatives that generate 10,000 first generation domestic prints as well as RGB HD video masters derived from the high resolution images.

Deluxe Laboratories assumes sole ownership of EFILM after reaching agreement to purchase Panavision’s interest in the industry’s premiere digital film laboratory. Already a 20% owner, Deluxe completes the purchase of Panavision’s 80% holding to become the outright owner of EFILM.

- 2005 - EFILM introduces the EWorks digital color correction system in concert with Autodesk.

EFILM introduces a virtual keycode mechanism that enables unique tracking, identification, frame accurate editing and asset management of each and every frame (up to 5.45 sextillion), either digitally generated, composited with other (single or multiple) film material.

- 2006 - The Rank Group announces that it has agreed to sell Deluxe Film to MacAndrews & Forbes Holdings Inc. The sale includes all worldwide business units within the Deluxe Film group. EFILM is now wholly owned by Deluxe.

EFILM creates and launches Colorstream. Colorstream is a proprietary viewing and color correction tool for use on the motion pictures set that allows for on-set emulation and pre-visualization of digitally captured content.

EFILM opens a separate division dedicated solely to finishing motion picture trailers.

- 2011 - EFILM develops post-production workflow for Extremely Loud and Incredibly Close, the first U.S. Feature film to shoot using the ARRIRAW format on the Alexa.
- 2020 - Framestore bought Deluxe's creative services and EFILM was absorbed into Company 3.
- 2021 - Kevin Cox retired.

== Awards ==
=== 2011 ===
- Hollywood Post Alliance (HPA) – Creativity and Innovation Award – The Tree of Life – Steven J. Scott
- Hollywood Post Alliance (HPA) – Outstanding Color Grading using a DI process – Feature Film – The Help – Steven J. Scott

== Feature films ==
- Space Jam: A New Legacy (2021)
- Ice Age: Collision Course (2016)
- The SpongeBob Movie: Sponge Out of Water (2015)
- Epic (2013)
- Skyfall (2012)
- Looper (2012)
- Ice Age: Continental Drift (2012)
- The Avengers (2012)
- John Carter (2012)
- The Vow (2012)
- War Horse (2011)
- The Twilight Saga: Breaking Dawn – Pt. 1 (2011)
- The Three Musketeers (2011)
- Killer Elite (2011)
- Abduction (2011)
- Seven Days in Utopia (2011)
- 30 Minutes or Less (2011)
- Cowboys & Aliens (2011)
- Friends with Benefits (2011)
- Snow and the Secret Fan (2011)
- Horrible Bosses (2011)
- Bad Teacher (2011)
- The Beaver (2011)
- Prom (2011)
- The Lincoln Lawyer (2011)
- Just Go with It (2011)
- The Rite (2011)
- The Adventures of Tin Tin (2011)
- Anonymous (2011)
- Moneyball (2011)
- Straw Dogs (2011)
- Bucky Larson: Born to Be a Star (2011)
- Colombiana (2011)
- Spy Kids: All the Time in the World in 4D (2011)
- The Help (2011)
- The Smurfs (2011)
- Captain America: The First Avenger (2011)
- Zookeeper
- Monte Carlo (2011)
- Jumping the Broom (2011)
- Thor (2011)
- Madea's Big Happy Family (2011)
- Battle Los Angeles (2011)
- The Roommate (2011)
- Another Earth (2011)
- Inside Man (2006)
- Robots (2005)
