= Songbird (2020 film) =

2020 US science fiction thriller film by Adam Mason

- Theatrical release poster
- Directed by: Adam Mason
- Written by: Adam Mason; Simon Boyes
- Produced by: Michael Bay; Marcei A. Brown; Jason Clark; Jeanette Volturno; Adam Goodman; Andrew Sugerman; Eben Davidson
- Starring: KJ Apa; Sofia Carson; Craig Robinson; Bradley Whitford; Peter Stormare; Alexandra Daddario; Paul Walter Hauser; Demi Moore
- Cinematography: Jacques Jouffret
- Edited by: Geoffrey O'Brien
- Music by: Lorne Balfe
- Production companies: Invisible Narratives; Platinum Dunes; Catchlight Studios; Endeavor Content; ICM Partners
- Distributed by: STXfilms
- Release date: December 11, 2020
- Running time: 85 minutes
- Country: United States
- Language: English
- Budget: $700,000–2.5 million
- Box office: $1 million

Songbird is a 2020 American dystopian science fiction thriller film based on the COVID-19 pandemic. It was directed by Adam Mason, who wrote the screenplay with Simon Boyes. Produced by Michael Bay, Adam Goodman, Andrew Sugerman and Eben Davidson, the film features an ensemble cast of KJ Apa, Sofia Carson, Craig Robinson, Bradley Whitford, Peter Stormare, Alexandra Daddario, Paul Walter Hauser and Demi Moore, depicting their struggle living under a highly strict and brutal quarantine by the highly authoritarian government in the midst of a mutating virus outbreak.

The film was released on December 11, 2020. It received generally negative reviews.

== Plot ==
By 2024, COVID-19 has been mutated into COVID-23 and the world is in its fourth quarantine year. In the United States, the nation's government is converted into a fascist police state and the people are required to take temperature checks on their cell phones while those infected with COVID-23 are taken from their homes against their will and forced into quarantine camps, also known as "Q-Zones" or concentration camps, where some fight back against the brutal restrictions. In these camps, the infected are left to die or forcibly get better.

Nico Price, a motorbike courier with immunity, due to the fact he was infected with the virus, is in a virtual relationship with Sara Garcia, a young artist living with her grandmother Lita whose lockdown prohibits them from physical contact. Nico works for Lester, who specializes in delivering packages to wealthy individuals. One of their biggest clients is the Griffins, Piper and William, whose daughter Emma has an auto-immune disorder. William is a former record executive having a sexual affair with May, a singer who makes a living online selling covers of classic songs. May develops a bond with Michael Dozer, a disabled war veteran who works for Lester as a drone operator to keep track of their couriers.

One night, Lita begins to show symptoms of COVID-23 while the "sanitation" department, led by Emmett Harland, is forcing Sara's neighbor Alice out of her apartment after she becomes infected. Emmett warns Sara that their apartment building has seen a rise in infections. He has also killed one of the infected individuals who escaped from the nearby Q-zone with a pocket knife. Sara informs Nico about Lita's condition, leading Nico to spend the night by Sara's apartment door. In the morning, Sara passes her temperature check, but Lita fails hers. Nico promises to keep Sara from being taken.

Nico contacts Lester to let him know that he's aware they are transporting illegal immunity wristbands. Lester tells him the Griffins are the ones selling them. When he goes to their house, the Griffins give Nico the phone number of their supposed supplier. Nico ends up meeting with Emmett at a warehouse, revealing it to be a trap which Nico escapes.

As Sara is waiting for Nico, Lita dies. The "sanitation" department arrives to bag Lita and detain Sara. Sara knocks out one of the members and takes his hazmat suit before escaping the building. Emmett and his team ultimately catch up to Sara, where he notes that Sara has yet to show symptoms of COVID-23 despite her exposure and is therefore immune. Sara is detained shortly afterward.

William demands to see May again, but May continually refuses, claiming she recorded him offering her an illegal immunity wristband. Piper overhears William's phone call with May and kicks him out of the house. William leaves to silence May, which Piper calls May to warn her about. May asks Michael if she can stay with him, to which he agrees. When May tries to leave, William arrives and tries to kill her, but Michael uses a weaponized drone to fatally shoot William.

Nico returns to the Griffins and confronts Piper, who says she was concerned Nico was trying to expose their illegal business. When Nico says he's only interested in saving Sara, Piper finally agrees to help and gives him a wristband for Sara. Nico returns to Sara's apartment to find Emmett, who tries to attack Nico but is stabbed by Nico in self-defense. Nico finds Sara's cell phone with a picture of the containment van and its tail number. With Lester and Michael's help, Nico races to the Q-Zone before Sara can be taken in. Nico is able to slip the immunity bracelet on Sara in time to be scanned, saving her from quarantine. As they embrace for the first time, Sara tells Nico she is truly immune.

In the aftermath, Piper and May frame William and Emmett as those responsible for the sale of illegal immunity wristbands. May and Michael begin a virtual relationship. Nico sends Lester his own immunity bracelet as thanks while he and Sara ride up the Pacific Coast Highway.

== Cast ==
- KJ Apa as Nico Price
- Sofia Carson as Sara Garcia
- Craig Robinson as Lester
- Bradley Whitford as William Griffin
- Peter Stormare as Emmett Harland
- Elpidia Carrillo as Lita Garcia
- Alexandra Daddario as May
- Lia McHugh as Emma Griffin
- Paul Walter Hauser as Michael Dozer
- Demi Moore as Piper Griffin
- Michole Briana White as Alice

== Production ==
=== Development and casting ===
On March 14, 2020, Adam Mason received a call from Simon Boyes, who had an idea for a film based on the COVID-19 pandemic. The pair spent the following weekend plotting out the film, pitching their idea to producer Adam Goodman near the end of March. In May 2020, it was reported that Michael Bay, Goodman and Eben Davidson would produce a film about the COVID-19 pandemic, titled Songbird. Mason, who co-wrote the screenplay with Boyes, was set to direct.

In June 2020, Demi Moore, Craig Robinson, Peter Stormare and Paul Walter Hauser were cast. In July, Bradley Whitford, KJ Apa and Sofia Carson joined the cast. The cast were remotely trained in preparation for the shoot.

=== Filming ===
Principal production commenced on July 8, 2020, in Los Angeles. Filming was initially halted by SAG-AFTRA, who granted the production permission to proceed a day later. The film wrapped on August 3, 2020. It became the first film to shoot in Los Angeles during the lockdown due to COVID-19 restrictions. The production adhered to safety protocols including regular testing, a maximum crew size of 40 per day, and keeping actors separated. Bay, who was one of the producers, directed the film's action scenes.

=== Music ===
In October 2020, Lorne Balfe confirmed to score the film. The soundtrack album was released on December 11, 2020, by Sony Classical. The song "Three Little Birds" by Bob Marley, was featured in the film's official trailer. The film's end title, "Kingdom" was released on the same day alongside the film. Performed and written by artist Roseanna (Røyale), who is former lead singer, Roseanna Brown of The Rua. Co-written and produced by Irish singer and producer Liam Geddes.

== Release ==
In August 2020, STX Entertainment acquired North American and UK distribution rights to the film. The film was released through premium VOD on December 11, 2020, and was planned to be released on a major streaming service provider in 2021. It became the fourth-most rented film on FandangoNow in its debut weekend.

The trailer was released in October 2020, with a poor response from critics and audiences. Criticism was aimed towards the production and timing of release due to the COVID-19 pandemic, as well as romanticization of the topic, being compared unfavorably to Romeo and Juliet.

== Critical response ==
On review aggregator website Rotten Tomatoes, the film holds an approval rating of 9% based on 79 reviews, with an average rating of 3.5/10. The site's critics consensus reads: "Muddled, tedious, and uninspired, Songbird's gimmick never coalesces into a meaningful story about pandemic lockdown." At Metacritic, the film has a weighted average score of 27 out of 100, based on 12 critics, indicating "generally unfavorable reviews".

Alonso Duralde of TheWrap wrote "It's not inherently misguided to use a current tragedy as the jumping-off point of a genre movie, but any filmmaker who decides to do so had better create something provocative or interesting or at least competent to justify it." Writing for IndieWire, David Ehrlich gave the film a "D" and said, "For all of its gimmicky appeal, Songbird is bad enough that your entire neighborhood will be able to smell it streaming onto your TV, and it gets worse faster than your nose can adjust to the stench." Korey Coleman of Double Toasted found Peter Stormare's performance humorous, but criticized the overall message of the film, calling it "irresponsible", and noted the numerous plot holes imbued by the love story which overtook the entire premise.

Rebecca Onion of Slate wrote: "Songbird isn't very good, which you might expect for something thrown together so quickly... But watching it in the midst of our slow-motion disaster, it looks not just bad, but ridiculous." Brian Tallerico of RogerEbert.com gave the film 0/4 stars and wrote: "The truth is that even if one sets aside all potential moral arguments about the very existence of Songbird, it's still just really bad." Frank Scheck of The Hollywood Reporter wrote: "Despite the high-stakes drama, there's nary a compelling moment throughout, and some of the characterizations... are so absurdly one-note that it's hard not to think that the film is meant as parody."

Kevin Maher of The Times was more positive in his review of the film, giving four out of five stars and writing: "It's patchy, admittedly, in places... but it's also audacious and the first mainstream film to address unapologetically, in every scene, in every frame of film, our present situation." Benjamin Lee of The Guardian gave the film three out of five stars, saying that it was "an acceptably watchable thriller that's more notable for what it achieves technically than anything else." Robbie Collin of The Daily Telegraph also gave the film three out of five stars, saying that it was "even more spectacularly crass and exploitative than you could have possibly hoped", and concluded: "Songbird itself delivers an enjoyably tactless jolt of trash-cinema bravado."
