= Company 3 =

American post-production company

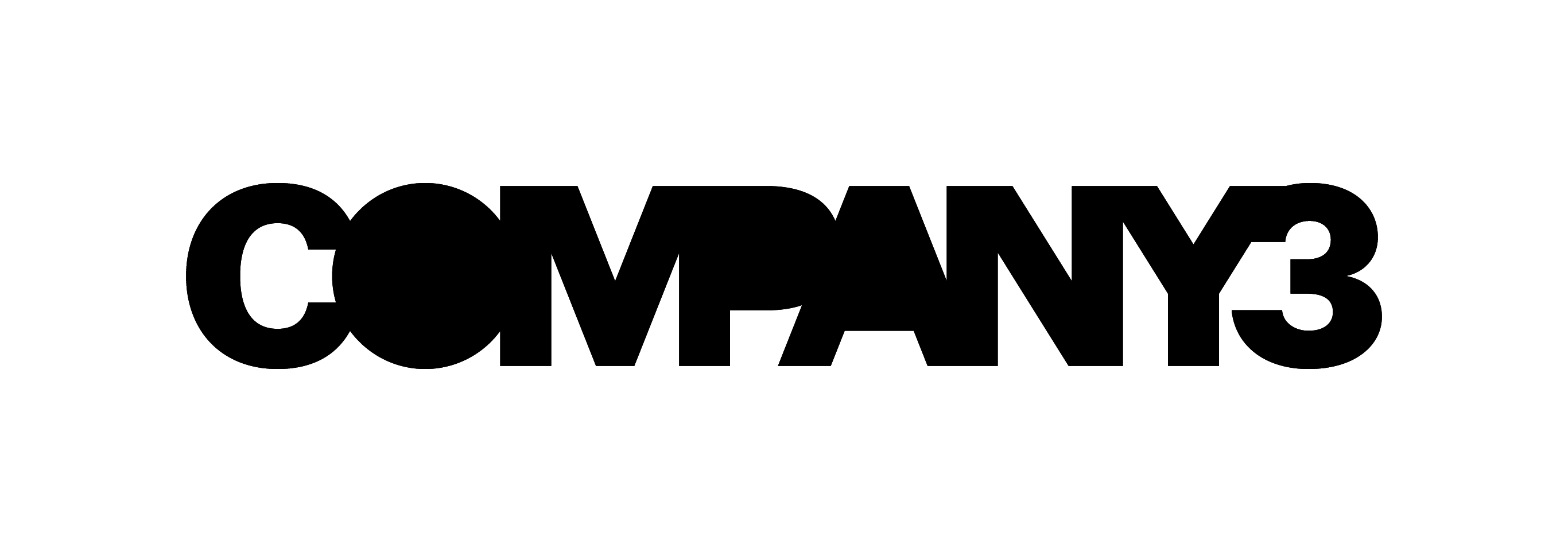
- Industry: Post-production
- Founded: 1997
- Headquarters: Los Angeles, California
- Number of locations: Los Angeles, New York, London, Toronto, Vancouver, Pune
- Key people: Stefan Sonnenfeld, President and Managing Director; Mike Pethel, Co-Founder and Colorist
- Services: Color Grading, Feature Film Finishing
- Parent: Framestore
- Website: Official Website

Company 3 (CO3) is an American visual effects and post-production company founded in 1997 by colorists Stefan Sonnenfeld and Mike Pethel and visual effects artist/supervisor Noel Castley-Wright. Rob Walston brought the team of artists together and founded Company 3 under 4 Media Company (4MC). Company 3 provides post-production, color grading, and location services for feature films, commercials, music videos, and television.

== History ==
Sonnenfeld, Pethel and Castley-Wright opened Company 3 in Santa Monica, CA in 1997 and launched a New York, NY location in 2002. In 2010, Company 3 New York moved into a new facility located in Chelsea, Manhattan which houses both Company 3 and its sister visual effects facility, Method Studios. Other offices are located in London, Atlanta, Chicago and Detroit.

In 2000, Company 3, which was then a part of Four Media Company, was acquired by Liberty Media Corporation. In 2010, Deluxe Entertainment Services Group, Inc. acquired Company 3 along with its sister companies Beast Editorial, Encore, Level 3 Post, Method Studios, RIOT and Rushes.

In November 2020, after Deluxe filed for bankruptcy a year prior, it was announced that Company 3, along with Method Studios and several of Deluxe's other creative businesses, would be acquired by major visual effects studio, Framestore.

== Awards ==
2014

- HPA Award – Outstanding Color Grading (Commercial) - Doosan "Heavy Industries" – Siggy Ferstl

2013

- HPA Award – Outstanding Color Grading (Commercial) - Under Armour "Brought To You By Under Armour" – Tom Poole
- MVPA Award – Best Colorist/Telecine – Lana Del Rey – “National Anthem” – Dave Hussey

2012

- HPA Award – Outstanding Color Grading (Commercial) - Chrysler "Halftime in America" – Siggy Ferstl
- MVPA Award - Best Colorist - Rihanna "We Found Love" - Dave Hussey
- AICE Award – Color Grading - Chrysler "Halftime in America" – Siggy Ferstl

2011

- HPA Award – Outstanding Color Grading (Commercial) - Nissan "Zero" – Siggy Ferstl

2010

- HPA Award – Outstanding Color Grading Using a DI Process – Alice in Wonderland – Stefan Sonnenfeld
- HPA Award – Outstanding Color Grading (Commercial) – AT&T "Legends" – Siggy Ferstl

2009

- HPA Award – Outstanding Color Grading (Commercial) – Pepsi “Pass” – Stefan Sonnenfeld
- HPA Award – Outstanding Color Grading (Television) – "Yogi’s Bronx" – Siggy Ferstl

2007

- HPA Award – Best Color Grading (Feature Film) – 300 – Stefan Sonnenfeld
- HPA Award – Outstanding Color Grading (Commercial) – Nike “Take Over” – Dave Hussey

2006

- da Vinci Award – Master Colorist (Feature) – Underworld: Evolution - Siggy Ferstl
- HPA Award – Outstanding Color Correction - ESPN's Arthur Ashe Awards – “Afghan Women's Soccer” - Siggy Ferstl

2005

- MVPA Award – Best Colorist/Telecine – Modest Mouse – “Ocean Breathes Salty” – Dave Hussey
- da Vinci Award – Master Colorist (Feature) – “Travelers and Musicians” – Siggy Ferstl

2004

- MVPA Award – Best Colorist/Telecine – Beyoncé feat. Jay-Z – “Crazy in Love” – Dave Hussey
