= Adam Goodman =

American film producer

- Occupations: Film industry executive; television producer; film producer

Adam Goodman is an American film industry executive, television producer, and film producer. He previously served as President of Paramount Pictures and currently is the owner of Dichotomy, a film production company, and Invisible Narratives, a digital studio.

== Early career ==
Goodman started working in motion pictures while still in high school. Before joining DreamWorks Pictures as an assistant, Goodman worked as a production assistant on films produced by John Hughes.

== Career ==
Goodman served as President of Paramount Motion Picture Group from 2009 to 2015. Some of the films that he helped bring to the screen include Mission: Impossible – Ghost Protocol (2011), the Teenage Mutant Ninja Turtles reboot (2014), and the Paranormal Activity franchise. During his tenure, Paramount also rebooted Star Trek with J. J. Abrams and launched a series of films based on the action figures line G.I. Joe. The company weathered a third-act reshoot on World War Z to turn it into a $540 million global hit.

In early 2016, Goodman exited Paramount at a time when the studio was struggling with a thin film slate. He was replaced by Marc Evans as President.

Shortly after departing from Paramount, Goodman formed his own film production company, Dichotomy. Goodman has also gone on to start a digital content studio called Invisible Narratives.
