= Jacques Jouffret =

French cinematographer

- Born: Paris, France
- Education: New York University Tisch School of the Arts
- Occupation: Cinematographer
- Years active: 1993–present

Jacques Jouffret is a French cinematographer.

== Education ==
He was raised in Paris, and graduated from New York University Tisch School of the Arts.

== Career ==
He worked as a camera operator and Steadicam operator on various feature and television films, including Gummo, The Pentagon Wars, Swordfish and Seabiscuit.

In 2008, he won the Society of Camera Operators' Camera Operator of the Year Award for Into the Wild.

In 2020, Jouffret served as cinematographer for Songbird, noted for being filmed during the early days of the COVID-19 pandemic in California.

Jouffret became a member of the American Society of Cinematographers in 2023.

== Filmography ==
Film

| Year | Title | Director | Notes |
|---|---|---|---|
| 2013 | The Purge | James DeMonaco | |
| 2014 | The Purge: Anarchy | James DeMonaco | |
| 2016 | The Purge: Election Year | James DeMonaco | |
| 2018 | Truth or Dare | Jeff Wadlow | |
| 2018 | Mile 22 | Peter Berg | |
| 2019 | Escape Plan: The Extractors | John Herzfeld | Direct-to-video |
| 2020 | Bloodshot | David S. F. Wilson | |
| 2020 | Joe Bell | Reinaldo Marcus Green | |
| 2020 | Spell | Mark Tonderai | |
| 2020 | Songbird | Adam Mason | |
| 2022 | Father Stu | Rosalind Ross | |
| 2023 | Gran Turismo | Neill Blomkamp | |
| 2024 | Arthur the King | Simon Cellan Jones | |
| 2025 | Novocaine | Dan Berk; Robert Olsen | |
| 2026 | The Mosquito Bowl | Peter Berg | |
| 2026 | The Beast | Renny Harlin | |

Television

| Year | Title | Director | Notes |
|---|---|---|---|
| 2022–2023 | Jack Ryan | Jann Turner; Shana Stein | 4 episodes |
| 2025 | American Primeval | Peter Berg | Miniseries |
